= List of shopping malls in Texas =

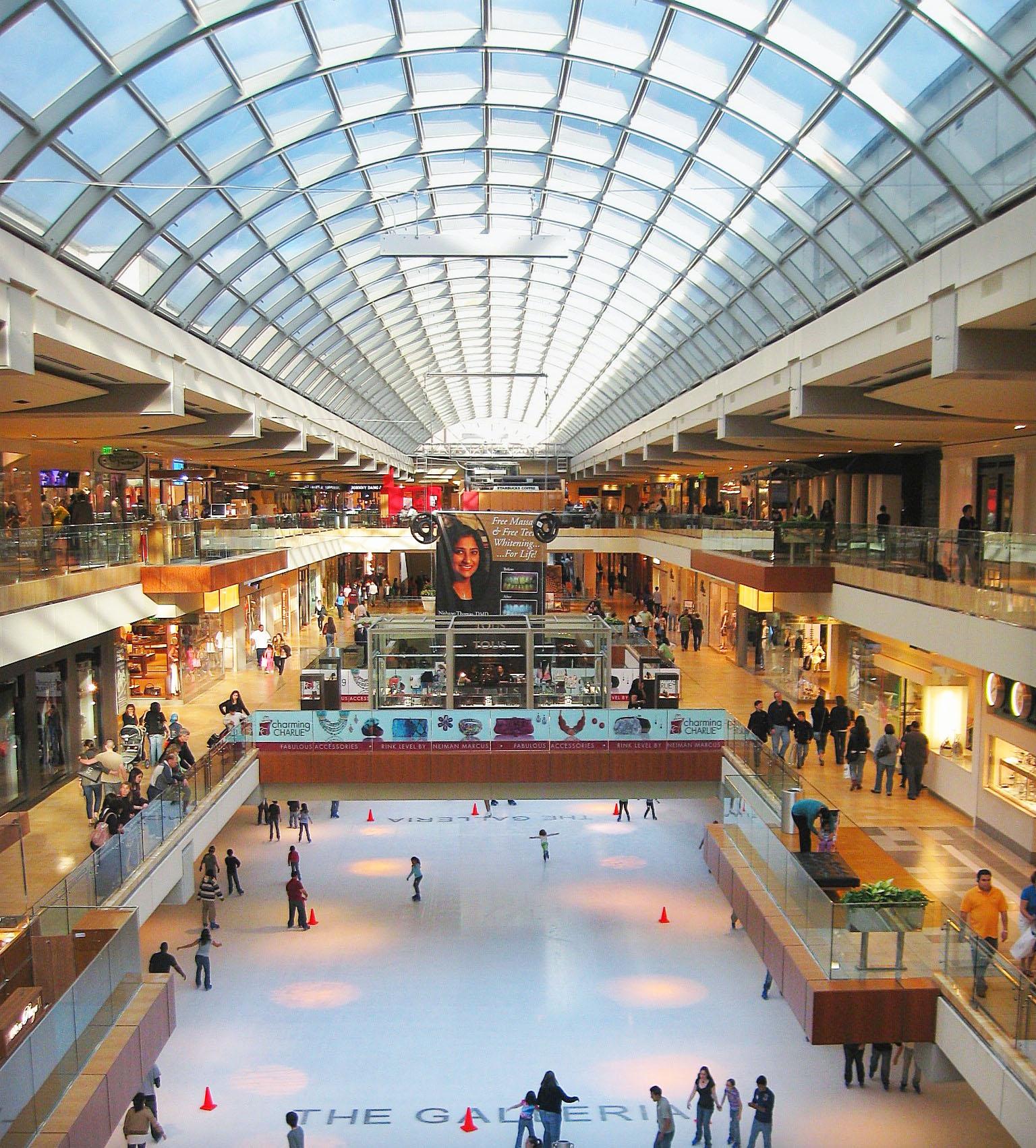
The Galleria in Houston.

The history of shopping malls in Texas began with the oldest shopping center in the United States, Highland Park Village, which opened in 1931 in the Dallas–Fort Worth Metroplex. The latter and Greater Houston area are both home to numerous regional shopping malls and shopping centers located in various areas of the city.

The Galleria in Houston is the largest mall in Texas.

The Dallas–Fort Worth area has the most shopping malls in Texas.

DFW and Houston also has many other shopping centers, outlet stores, and bazaars.

== Enclosed Shopping malls by region ==
=== Dallas-Fort Worth Metroplex ===
Mall Name	Location	Gross Leasable Area sq. feet / (m^{2})	Total Stores
NorthPark Center	North Dallas	2,000,000 sq ft (185,800 m^{2})*	225
Grapevine Mills	Grapevine	1,779,663 sq ft (165,300 m^{2})	200+
Valley View Center (Closed in 2022)	North Dallas	1,635,449 sq ft (151,900 m^{2})	134
Stonebriar Centre	Frisco	1,600,000 sq ft (148,600 m^{2})	200
North East Mall	Hurst	1,543,932 sq ft (143,400 m^{2})	135
The Parks at Arlington (Parks Mall)	Arlington	1,510,000 sq ft (140,300 m^{2})	180
Galleria Dallas	North Dallas	1,400,000 sq ft (130,100 m^{2})	200+
The Shops at Willow Bend	Plano	1,391,000 sq ft (129,200 m^{2})	150
Ridgmar Mall	West Fort Worth	1,269,135 sq ft (117,900 m^{2})	> 70
Town East Mall	Mesquite	1,250,000 sq ft (116,100 m^{2})	185
Collin Creek Mall (Closed in 2019)	Plano	1,100,000 sq ft (102,200 m^{2})	130
The Shops at RedBird	South Dallas	1,084,528 sq ft (100,800 m^{2})	112
La Gran Plaza de Fort Worth	South Fort Worth, Texas	1,077,782 sq ft (100,100 m^{2})	200+
Six Flags Mall (Closed in 2016)	Arlington	1,049,000 sq ft (97,500 m^{2})	40
The Vista	Lewisville	1,046,000 sq ft (97,200 m^{2})	160
Irving Mall	Irving	1,044,000 sq ft (97,000 m^{2})	120
The Shops at Clearfork	Fort Worth	1,000,000 sq ft (92,900 m^{2})	60
Firewheel Town Center	Garland	989,552 sq ft (91,900 m^{2})	124
Hulen Mall	South Fort Worth	942,000 sq ft (87,500 m^{2})	120
The Shops at Legacy	Plano	909,304 sq ft (84,500 m^{2})	215
West 7th Fort Worth	Fort Worth	900,000 sq ft (83,600 m^{2})	
Forum 303 Mall (Demolished in 2007)	Arlington	875,000 sq ft (81,300 m^{2})	
Southlake Town Square	Southlake	861,887 sq ft (80,072 m^{2)}	120
Golden Triangle Mall	Denton	764,719 sq ft (71,000 m^{2})	91
Hillside Village	Cedar Hill	615,000 sq ft (57,100 m^{2})	65+
Big Town Mall (Demolished in 2006)	Mesquite	585,595 sq ft (54,400 m^{2})	
North Hills Mall (Demolished in 2007)	North Richland Hills	558,000 sq ft (51,800 m^{2})	85
The Shops at Park Lane	Dallas	550,000 sq ft (51,100 m^{2})	50
Allen Premium Outlets	Allen	548,490 sq ft (51,000 m^{2})	120+
Richardson Square	Richardson	513,887 sq ft (47,700 m^{2})	
Prestonwood Town Center (Demolished in 2004)	Dallas	469,945 sq ft (43,700 m^{2})	37
Casa Linda Plaza	East Dallas	460,838 sq ft (42,800 m^{2})	76
Grand Prairie Premium Outlets	Grand Prairie	419,523 sq ft (39,000 m^{2})	100+
Tanger Outlets Fort Worth	Fort Worth	386,285 sq ft (35,900 m^{2})	70+
Montgomery Plaza	Fort Worth	291,121 sq ft (27,000 m^{2})	49+
West Village	Dallas	244,000 sq ft (22,700 m^{2})	88
Highland Park Village	Highland Park	200,000 sq ft (18,600 m^{2})	101
The Shops at Terrell	Terrell, Texas	177,800 sq ft (16,500 m^{2})	40+
Mockingbird Station Shopping Center	Dallas	105,453 sq ft (9,800 m^{2})	35
Cali Saigon Mall	Garland	79,105 sq ft (7,300 m^{2})	41
Fort Worth Design District	Fort Worth		
*Denotes statistic based on information that will be valid after planned construction/renovation; shown value may be higher than current actual value.

=== Houston ===
Mall Name	Location	Retail Space sq. feet / (m^{2})	Total Stores
The Galleria	Uptown Houston	2,400,000 sq ft (223,000 m^{2})	400
Memorial City Mall	Memorial City, Houston	1,700,000 sq ft (157,900 m^{2})	145
Willowbrook Mall	Willowbrook	1,530,000 sq ft (142,100 m^{2})	160
The Woodlands Mall	The Woodlands	1,435,000 sq ft (133,300 m^{2})	160
Greenspoint Mall (closed in 2024)	Greenspoint, Houston	1,391,432 sq ft (129,300 m^{2})	96
Deerbrook Mall	Humble	1,280,000 sq ft (118,900 m^{2})	144
Baybrook Mall	Clear Lake, Houston	1,210,000 sq ft (112,400 m^{2})	175
Katy Mills	Katy	1,201,104 sq ft (111,586.2 m^{2})	200
San Jacinto Mall (demolished in 2019)	Baytown	1,150,000 sq ft (106,800 m^{2})	130
First Colony Mall	Sugar Land	1,110,000 sq ft (103,100 m^{2})	150
Pearland Town Center	Pearland	1,100,000 sq ft (102,200 m^{2})	90
West Oaks Mall	Alief, Houston	1,100,000 sq ft (102,200 m^{2})	64
PlazAmericas (formerly known as Sharpstown Mall)	Sharpstown, Houston	860,000 sq ft (79,900 m^{2})	70
Almeda Mall	Genoa, Houston	825,000 sq ft (76,600 m^{2})	60
Brazos Mall	Lake Jackson	680,000 sq ft (63,200 m^{2})	74
Houston Premium Outlets	Cypress	430,000 sq ft (39,900 m^{2})	120
Rice Village	Rice Village	300,000 sq ft (27,900 m^{2})	60
River Oaks District	Uptown Houston	300,000 sq ft (27,900 m^{2})	60
Highland Village	Highland Village, Houston	265,000 sq ft (24,600 m^{2})	60

=== San Antonio ===
Mall Name	Location	Gross Leasable Area sq. feet / (m^{2})	Total Stores
The Shops at La Cantera	Northwest San Antonio	1,310,777 sq ft (121,800 m^{2})	200+
North Star Mall	North Central San Antonio	1,257,000 sq ft (116,800 m^{2})	200+
Ingram Park Mall	Northwest San Antonio	1,130,000 sq ft (105,000 m^{2})	150+
Rivercenter	Downtown San Antonio	1,060,000 sq ft (98,500 m^{2})	100+
Rolling Oaks Mall	Northeast San Antonio	889,000 sq ft (82,600 m^{2})	100+
South Park Mall	South San Antonio	790,000 sq ft (73,400 m^{2})	85
Wonderland of the Americas	Balcones Heights	700,000 sq ft (65,000 m^{2})	40+

== Shopping malls in Texas, outside of the three largest metropolitan areas ==
=== Austin ===
- The Domain - Central Austin
- Barton Creek Square - South Austin
- Lakeline Mall - Cedar Park
- San Marcos Outlet Malls - San Marcos
- Round Rock Premium Outlets - Round Rock
- Hill Country Galleria - Bee Cave

=== El Paso ===
- Bassett Place - El Paso
- Cielo Vista Mall - El Paso
- Las Palmas Marketplace - El Paso
- Sunland Park Mall - El Paso
- The Fountains at Farah - El Paso
- The Outlet Shoppes at El Paso - El Paso

=== Corpus Christi ===
- La Palmera - Corpus Christi

=== Rio Grande Valley ===
- Sunrise Mall - Brownsville
- Amigoland Mall - Brownsville
- Valle Vista Mall - Harlingen
- La Plaza Mall - McAllen
- Rio Grande Valley Premium Outlets - Mercedes

=== Killeen-Temple ===
- Killeen Mall - Killeen
- Temple Mall - Temple

=== Midland-Odessa ===
- Midland Park Mall - Midland
- Music City Mall - Odessa

=== Beaumont-Port Arthur ===
- Central Mall - Port Arthur
- Parkdale Mall - Beaumont

=== Other, listed By 2010 metropolitan area size ===
- South Plains Mall - Lubbock (290,002 - metropolitan area population)
- Longview Mall - Longview (282,962)
- Broadway Square Mall - Tyler (264,521)
- Mall del Norte - Laredo (256,496)
- Westgate Mall - Amarillo (253,823)
- Richland Mall - Waco (238,564)
- Post Oak Mall - College Station (231,623)
- Mall of Abilene - Abilene (166,416)
- Sikes Senter - Wichita Falls (150,261)
- Central Mall - Texarkana (136,552)
- Midway Mall - Sherman (121,419)
- Victoria Mall - Victoria (116,230)
- Sunset Mall - San Angelo (113,443)
- Lufkin Mall - Lufkin (87,669)
- West Hill Mall - Huntsville (66,296)
- Mall de Las Aguilas - Eagle Pass (55,405)
- Plaza del Sol Mall - Del Rio (49,106)
- Heartland Mall - Brownwood (38,186)
- River Hills Mall - Kerrville
