= Irving Mall =

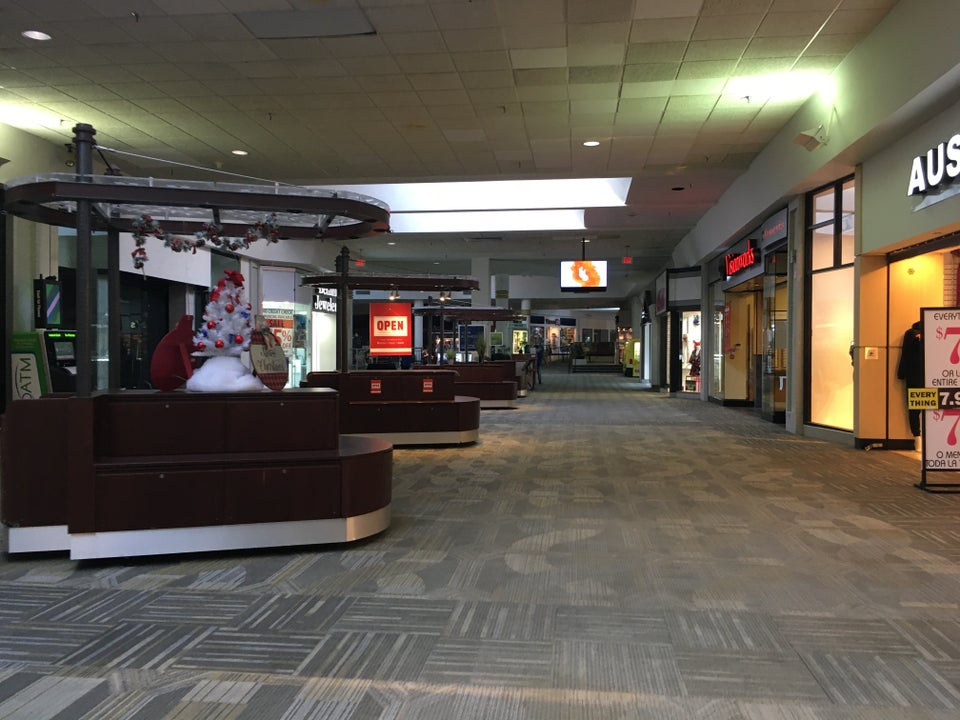
- Irving Mall, November 2020
- Location: Irving, Texas, United States
- Coordinates: 32°50′23″N 96°59′47″W
- Address: 3880 Irving Mall
- Opened: August 4, 1971; 55 years ago
- Developer: Melvin Simon and Associates
- Manager: CBRE
- Owner: Washington Prime Group
- Num. of stores: 105
- Num. of anchor tenants: 5 (4 open, 1 vacant)
- Floor area: 1,050,000 sq ft (98,000 m^{2})
- Floors: 2 (1 in former Sears, 3 in Macy's)
- Website: shopirvingmall.com

Irving Mall is an enclosed American shopping mall located in Irving, Texas, at the intersection of Texas State Highway 183 (Airport Freeway) and Belt Line Road. It has over 80 stores, including four anchor tenants as of November 29, 2020, and a food court.

It is under ownership of Washington Prime Group, which has filed for chapter 11 bankruptcy protection on June 13, 2021.

== History ==
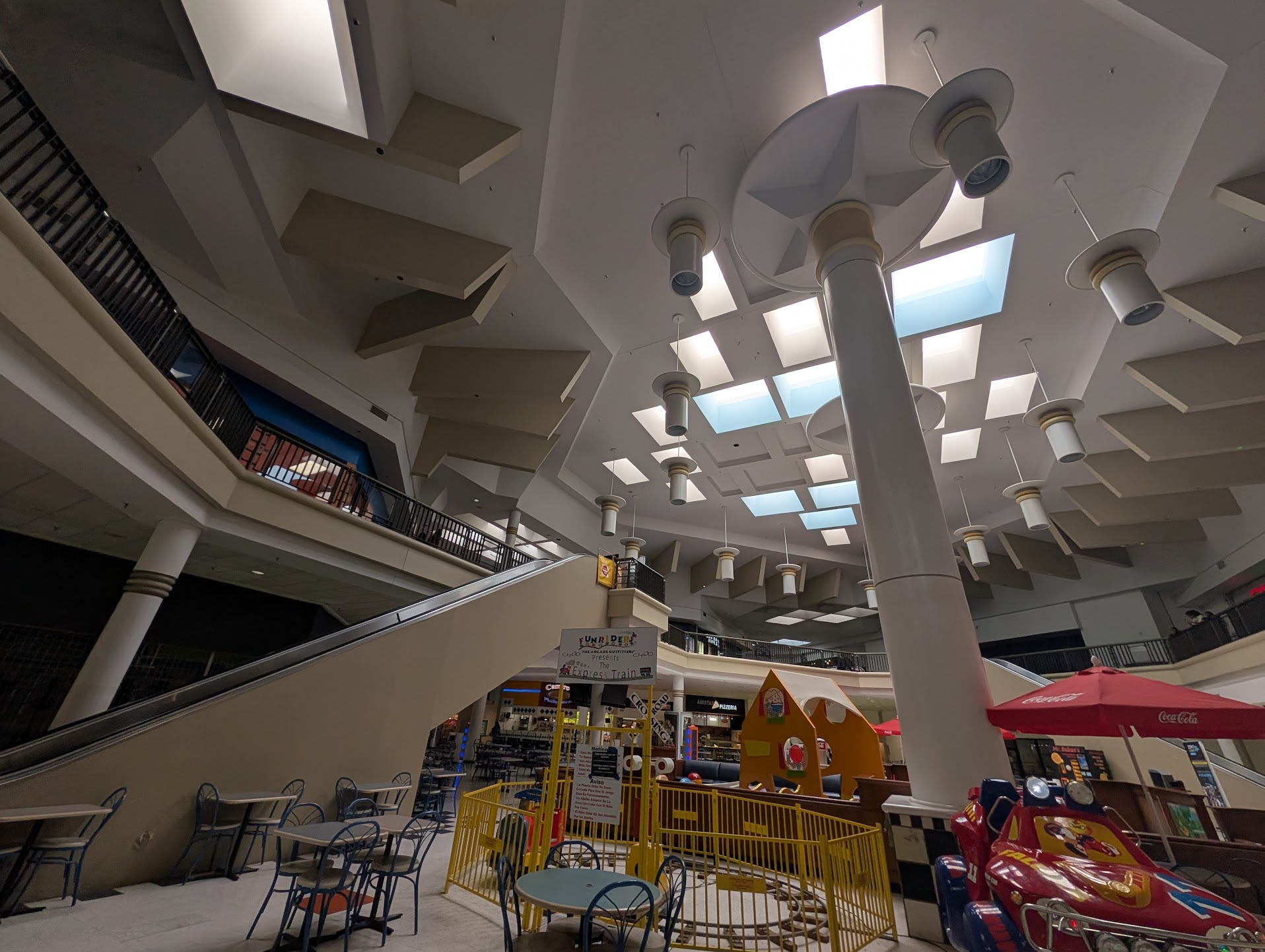
Southwest Court, October 2025

The mall opened with Titche-Goettinger, JCPenney, and Sears. JCPenney was closed as part of 44 underperforming stores and closed in 2001.

The mall received a renovation in 1984 adding the west wing of the mall along with two new anchors, Dillard's and Mervyn's and a new food court. The General Cinema, which opened in 1971 would later expand to 7 screens in the same year.

In 1999, General Cinema moved to a spot where a former Wilson's Catalog Showroom used to be. In the same year, as part of Irving Mall's redevelopment, Barnes & Noble also opened in the former General Cinema 1–3. Barnes & Noble closed in 2012, and is now a Shoppers World.

In 2002, AMC took over the former General Cinema at the mall, it was renovated in 2013.

As of June 2018, anchors include Macy's, Dillard's Clearance Center, and Burlington Coat Factory.

In May 28, 2014, Irving Mall was spun off by Simon Property Group to Washington Prime Group, with mall management being transferred by 2015.

In 2015, Sears Holdings spun off 235 of its properties, including the Sears at Irving Mall, into Seritage Growth Properties.

On October 15, 2018, it was announced that Sears would be closing as part of a plan to close 142 stores nationwide. The store closed in early January and currently sits vacant.

== Gallery ==
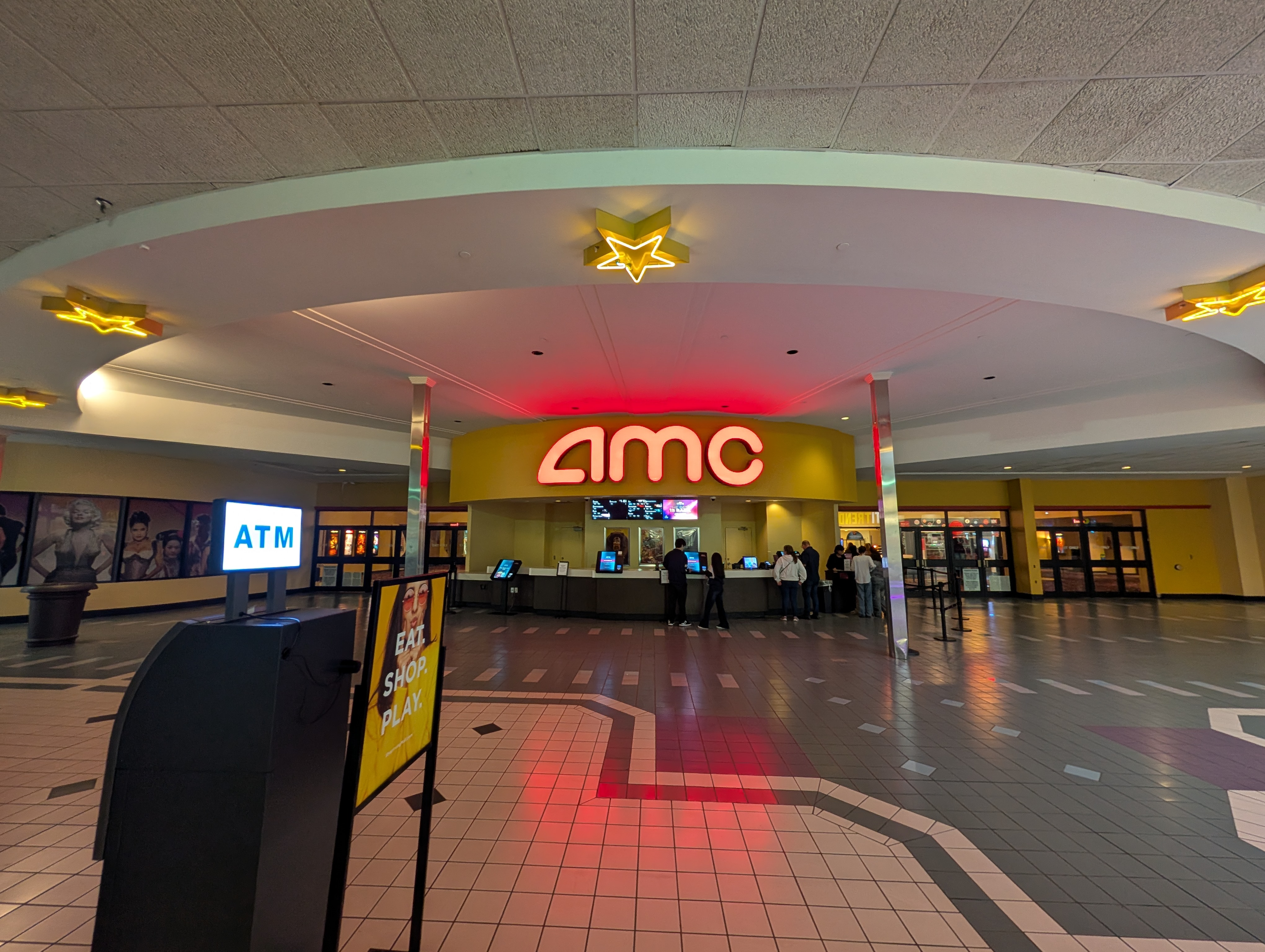
AMC Entrance, February 2026

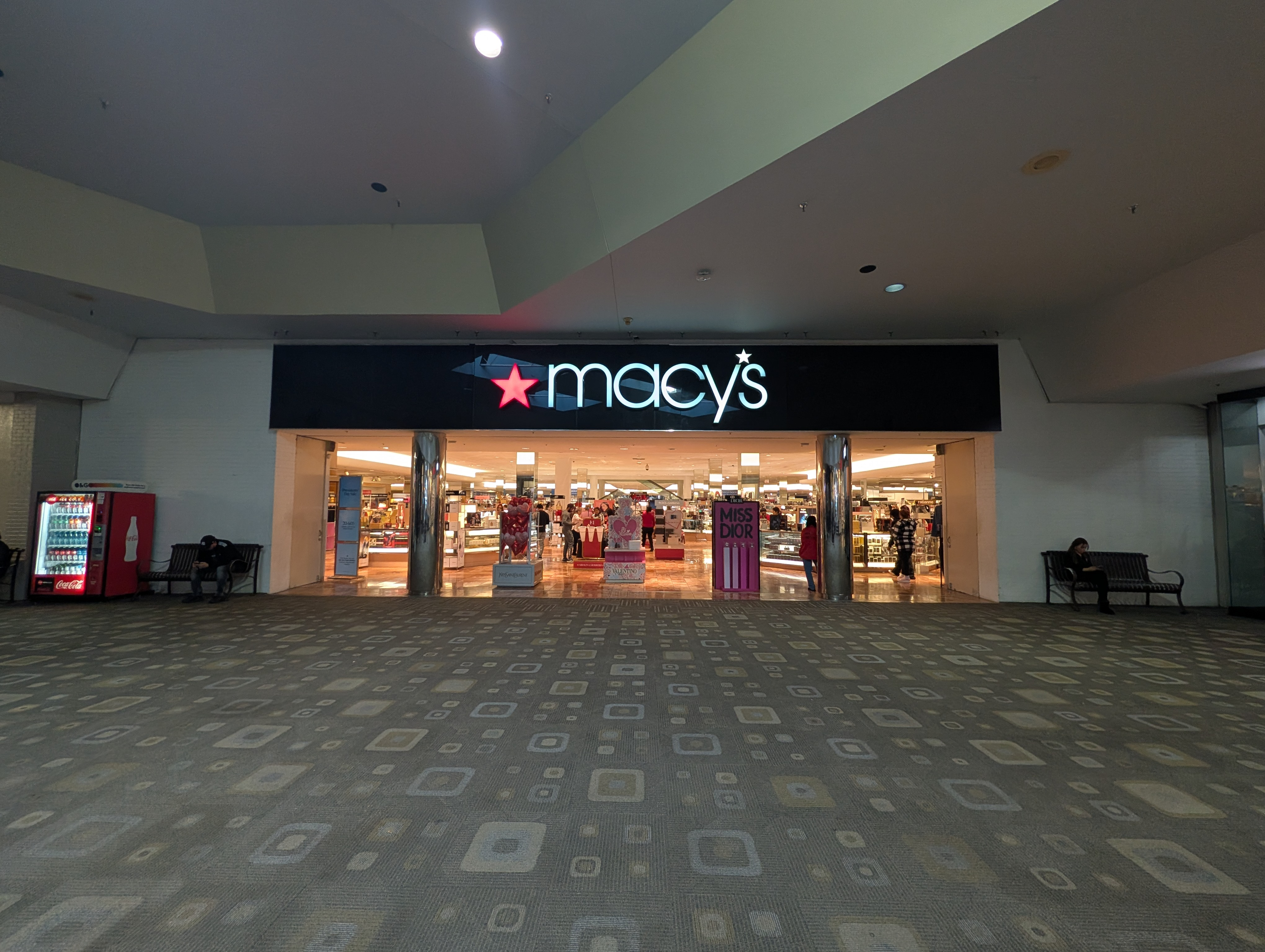
Macy's Entrance, February 2026

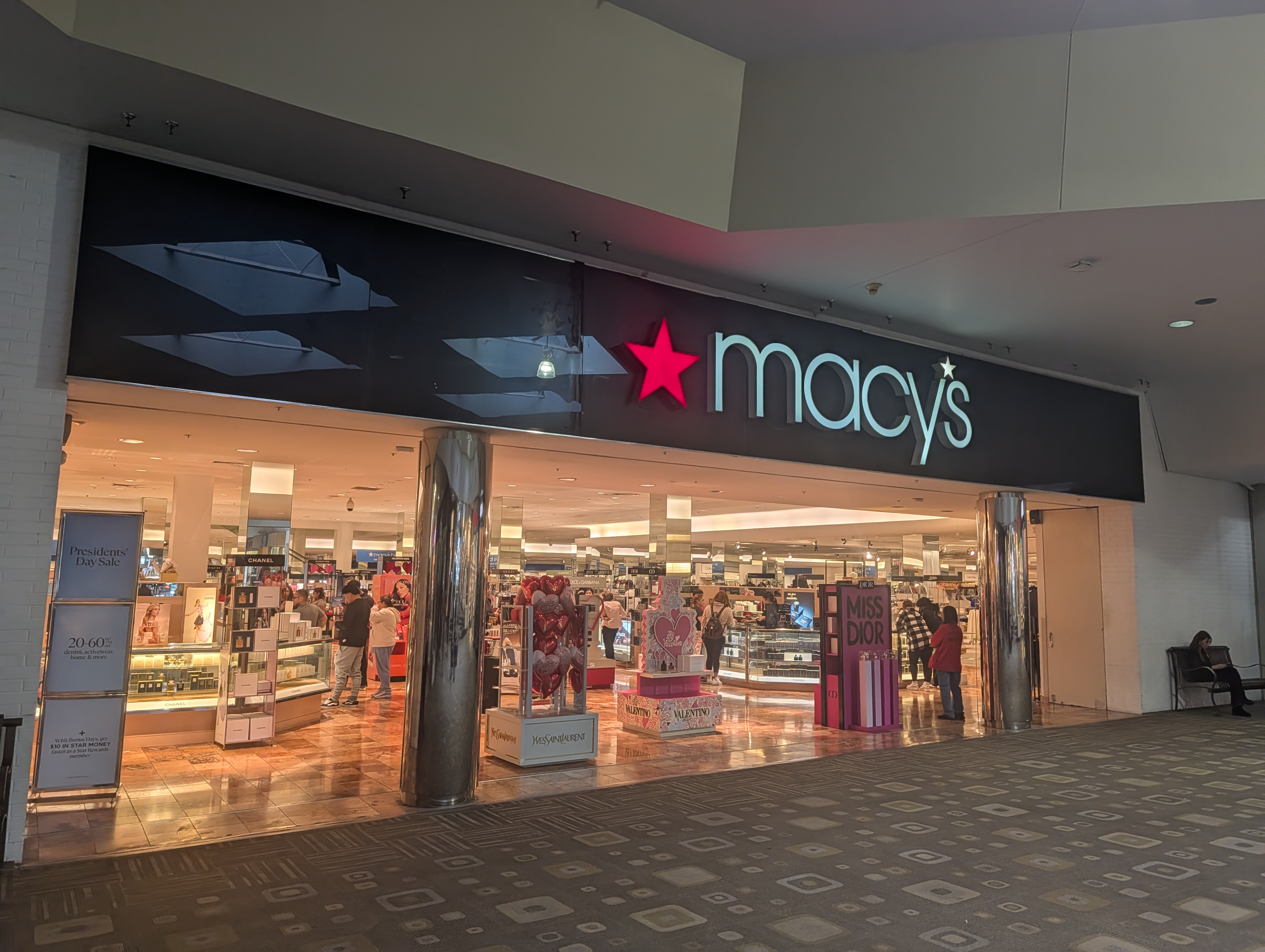
Macy's Entrance, February 2026

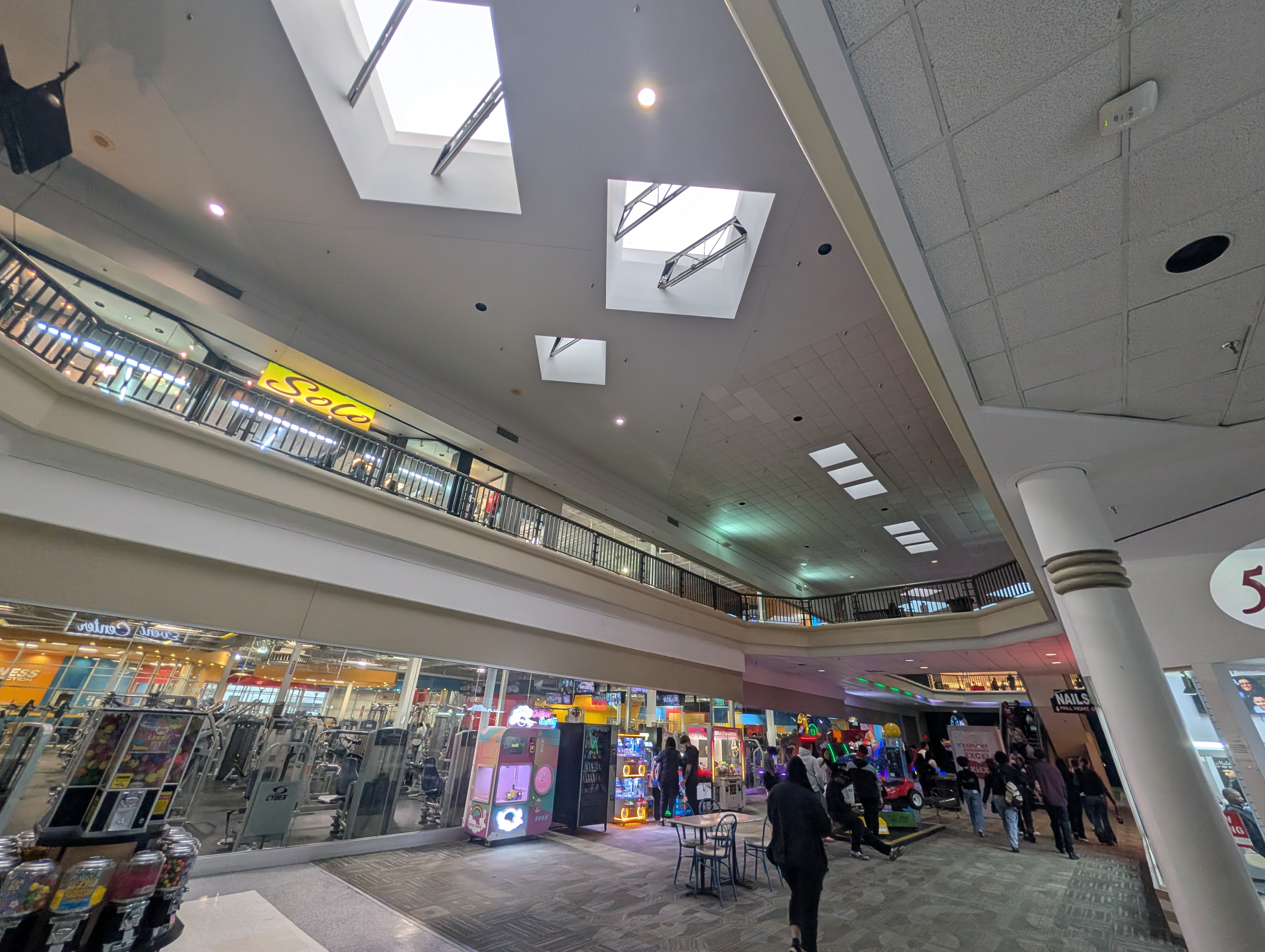
West Wing, February 2026

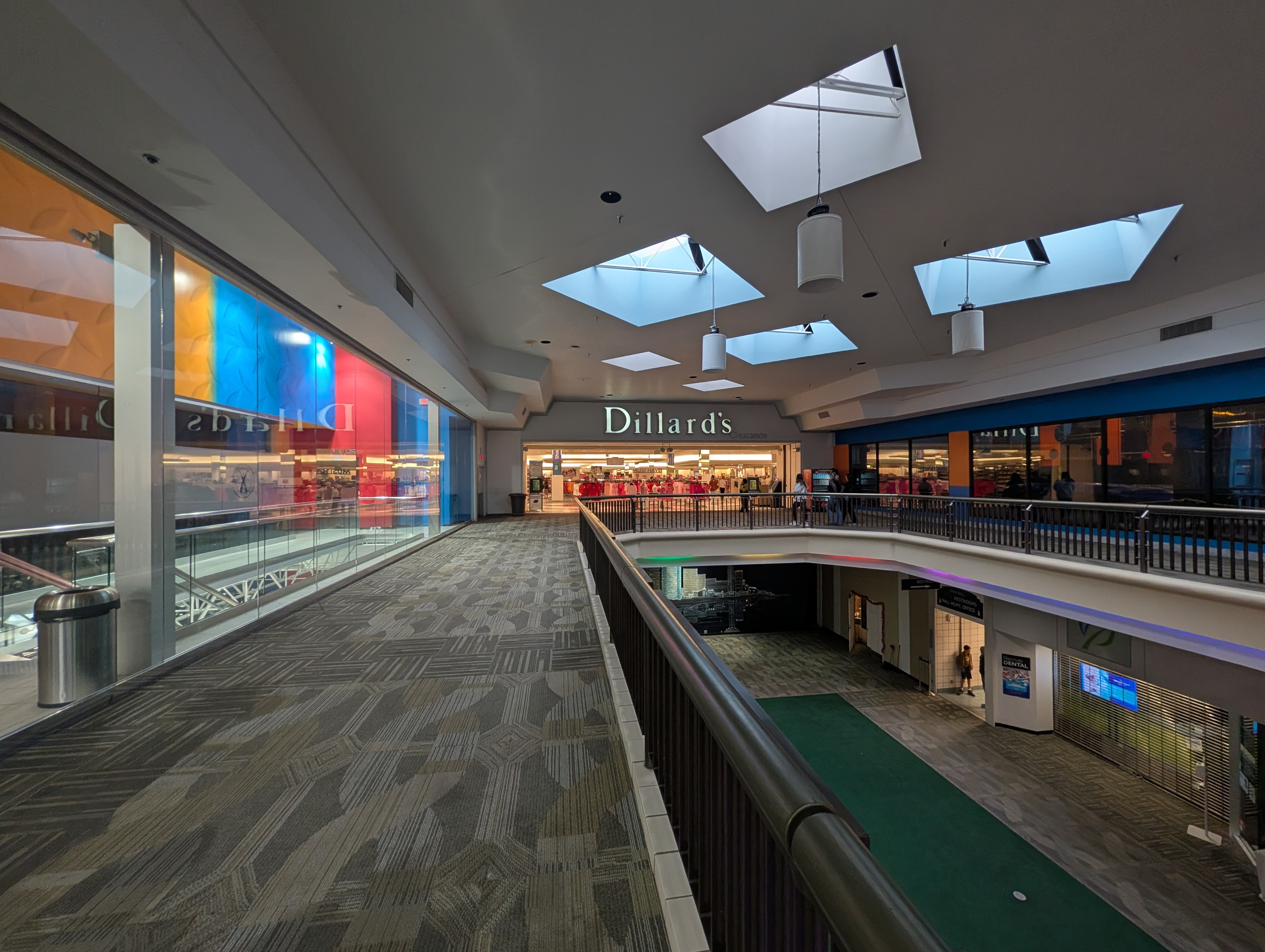
Dillard's Entrance, February 2026

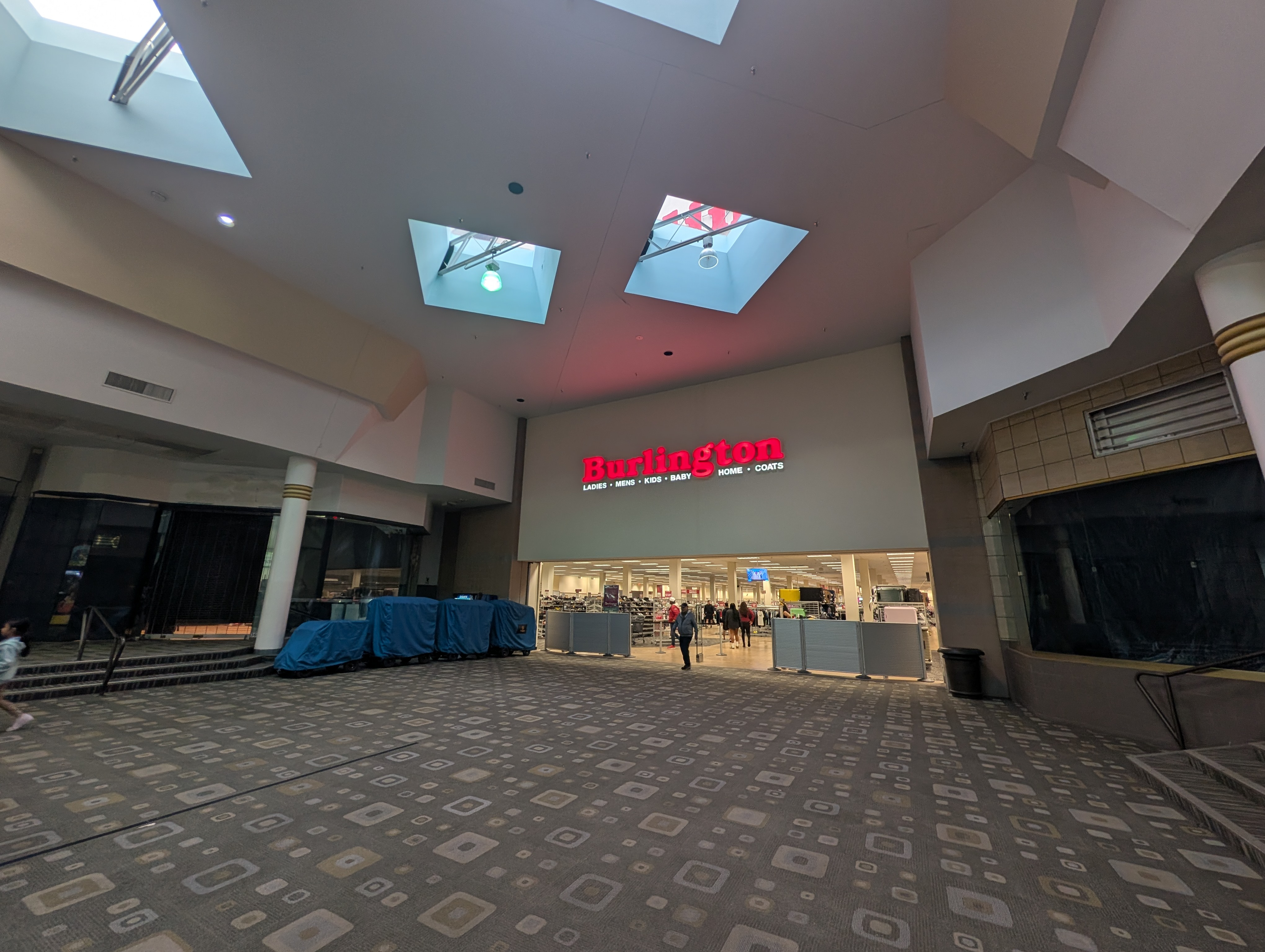
Burlington Entrance, February 2026

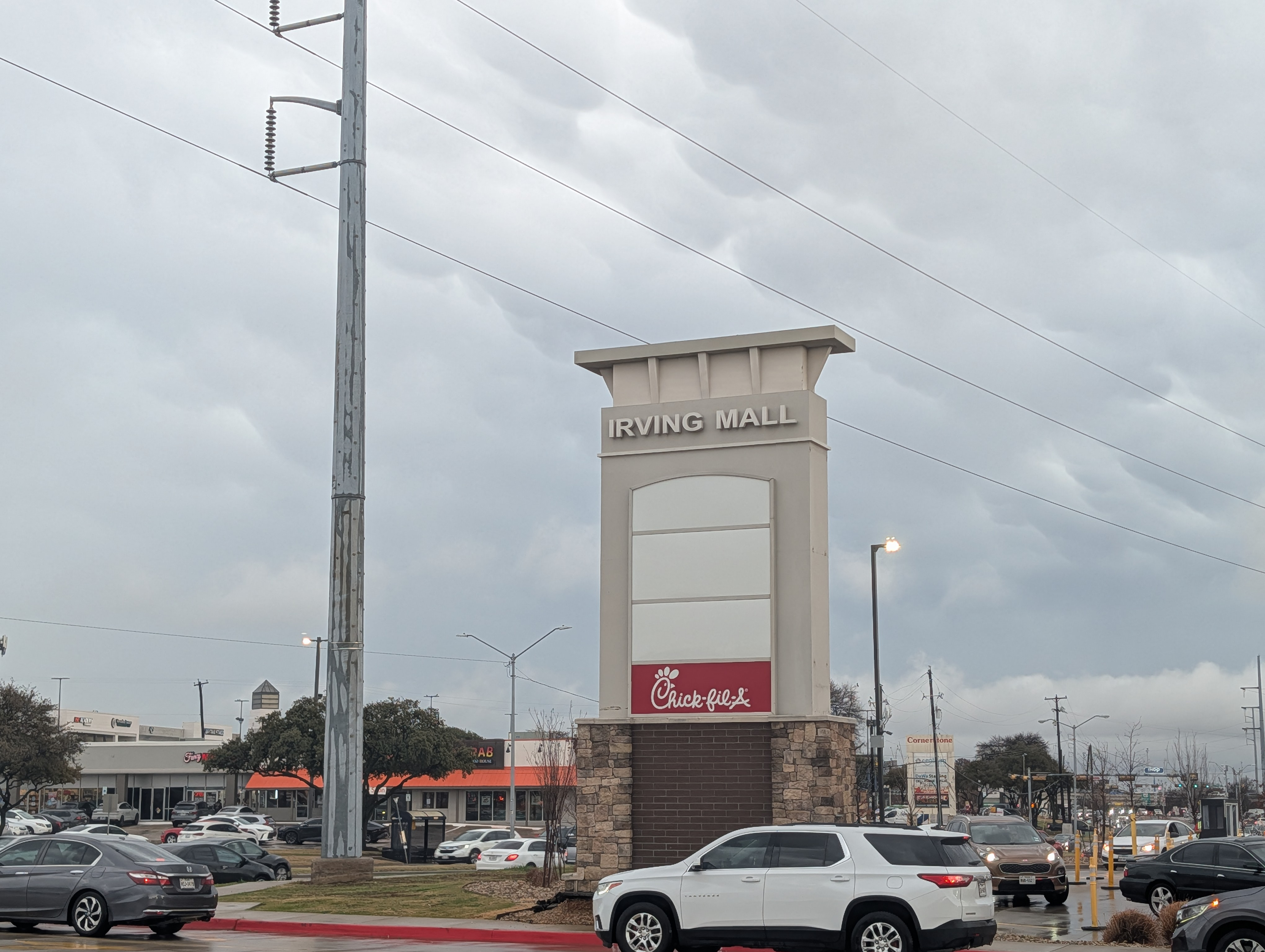
Mall Sign at Northeast Corner of Plot, February 2026

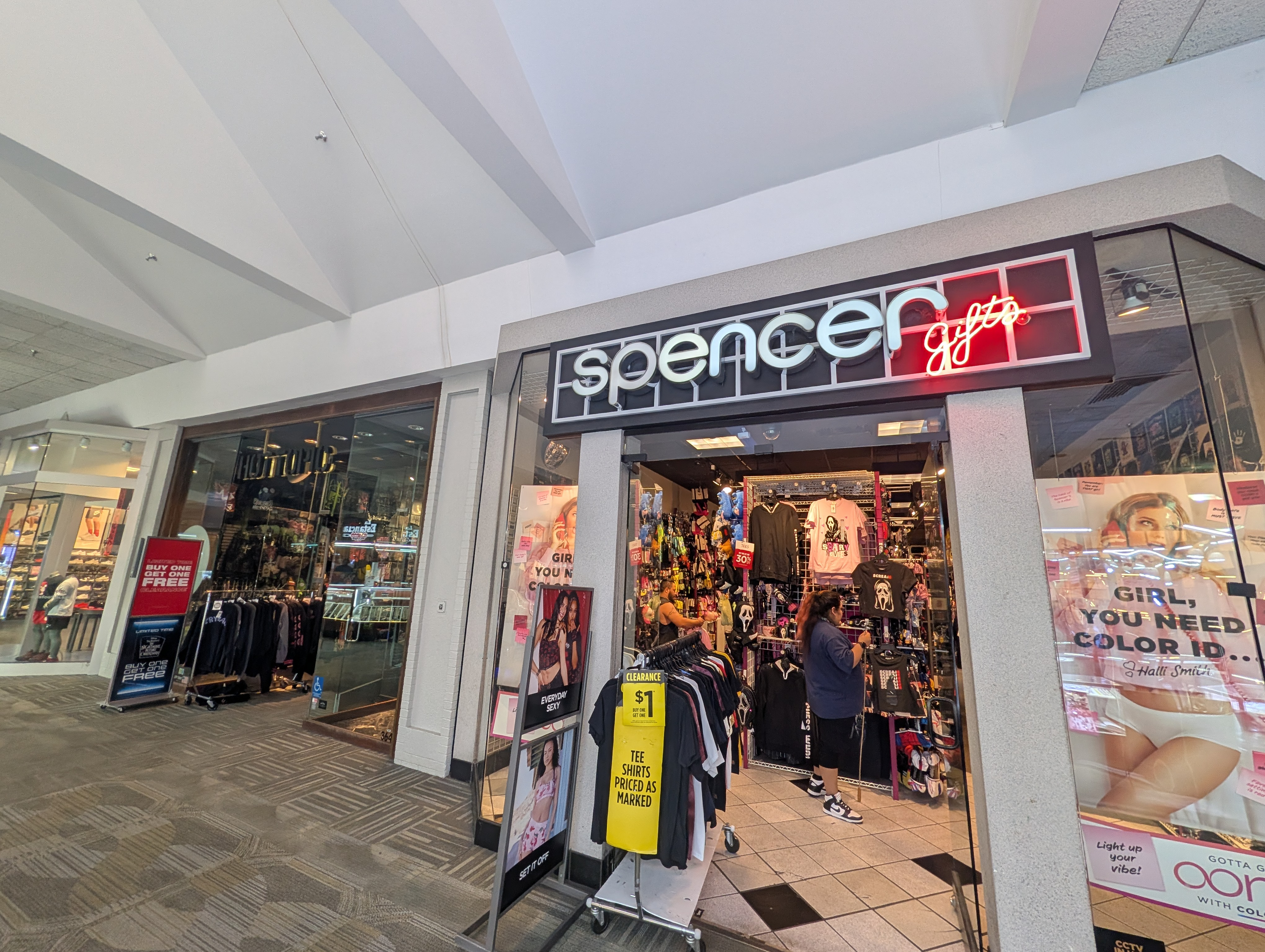
Spencer Gifts, February 2026

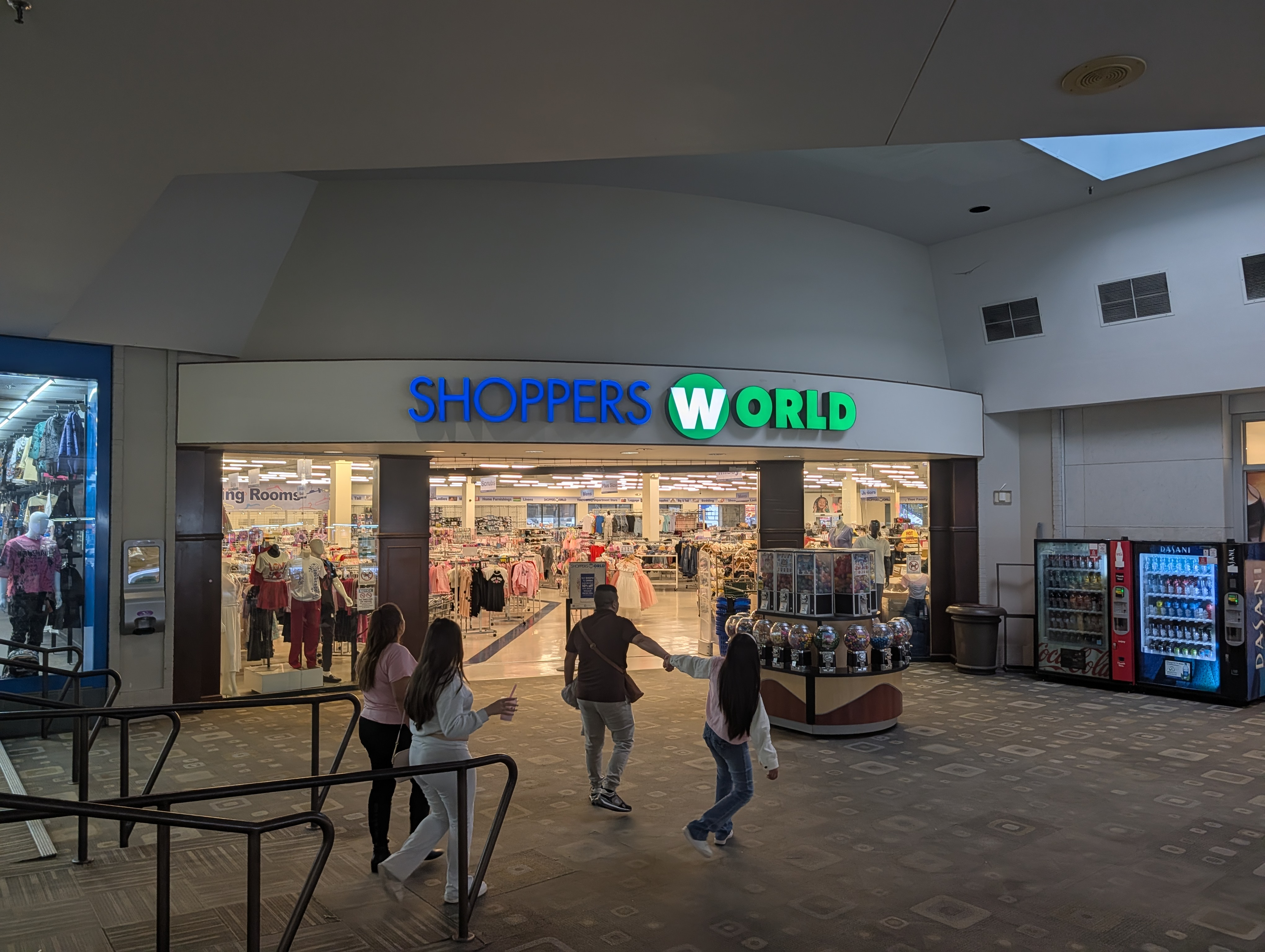
Shoppers World Entrance, February 2026

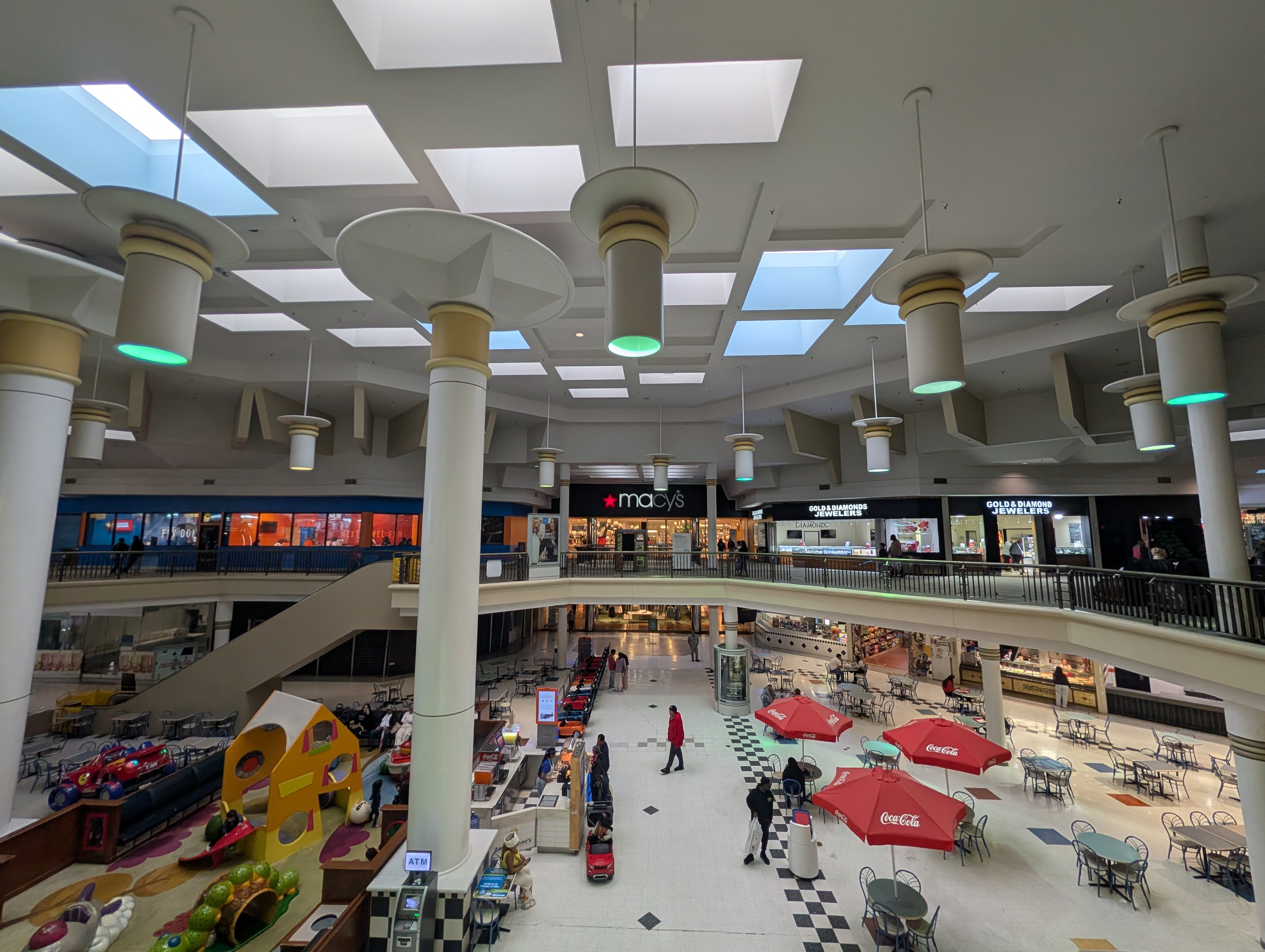
Southwestern Atrium, February 2026

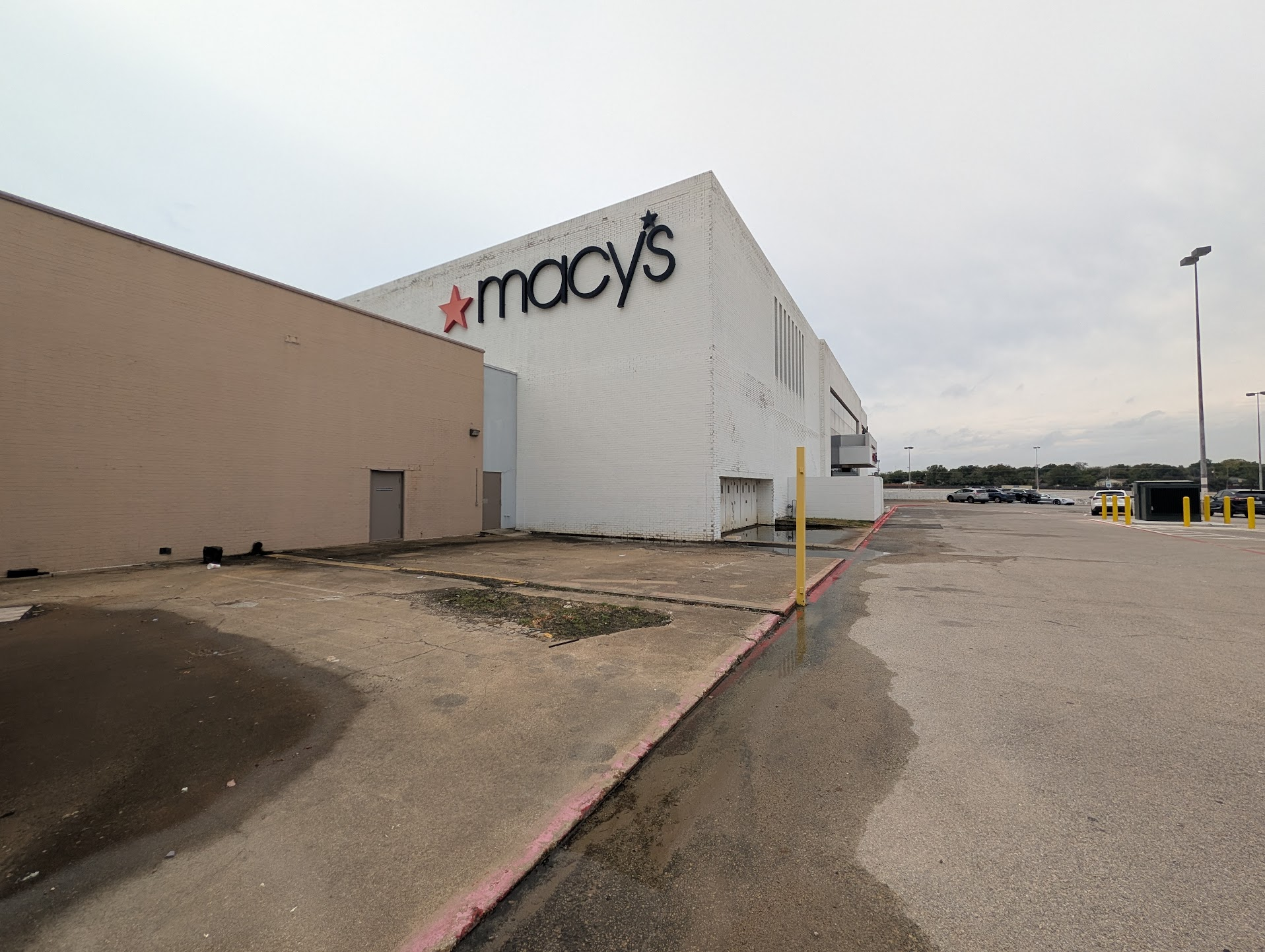
Macy's Exterior, October 2025

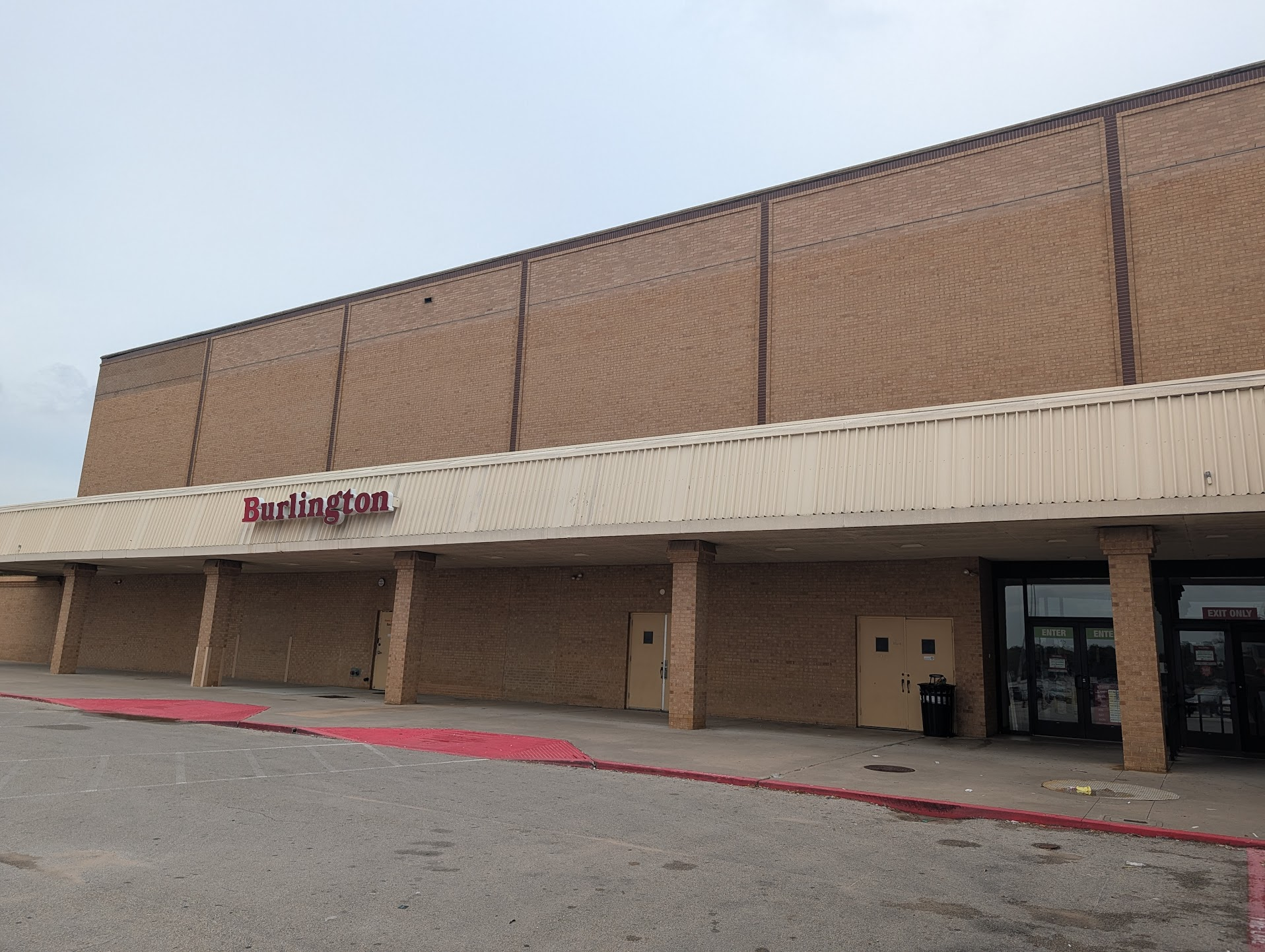
Burlington Coat Factory, October 2025

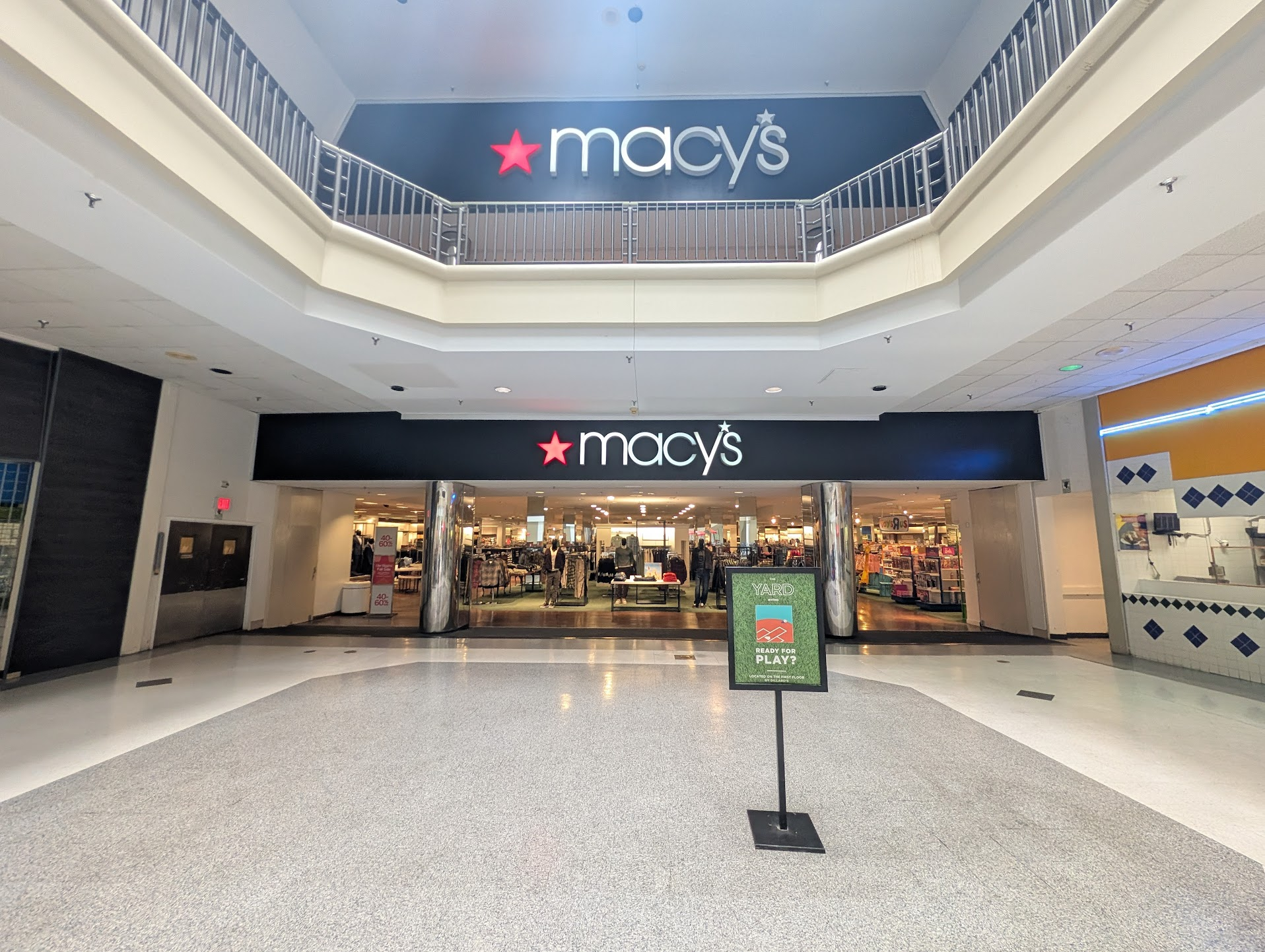
Macy's Entrance, October 2025

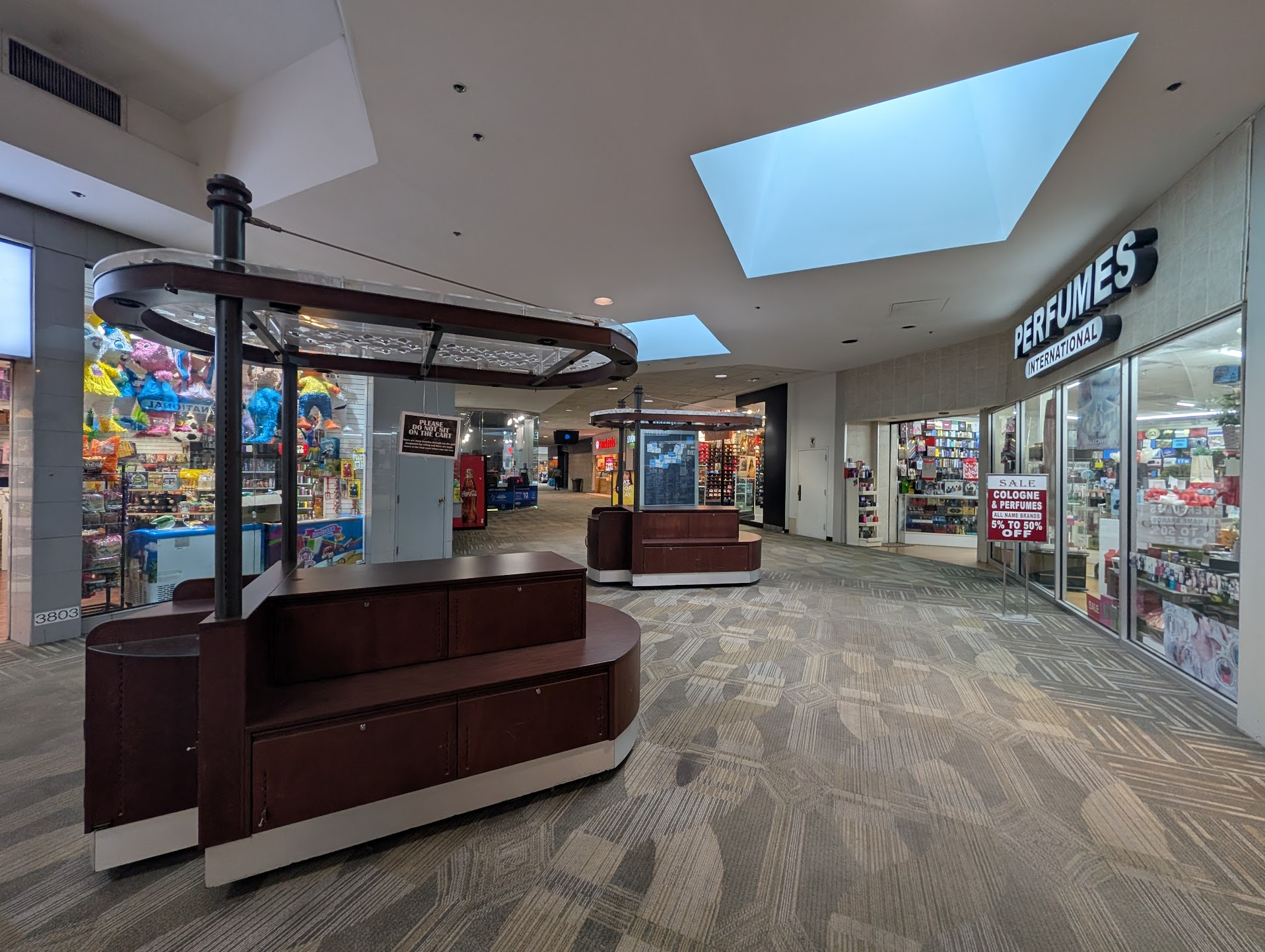
Southwest Wing, October 2025

== Transportation ==
DART Route 231 goes by it on Belt Line.

== See also ==
- List of shopping malls in Dallas, Texas
