= Hillside Village =

- Village Green
- Location: Cedar Hill, Texas, United States
- Coordinates: 32.6024560°N 96.9421209°W
- Opened: March 12, 2008
- Owner: PREP Hillside Real Estate, LLC
- Num. of stores: 65+
- Num. of anchor tenants: 3
- Floor area: 615,000 sq ft (57,100 m^{2})
- Website: shophillsidevillage.com

Hillside Village (formerly Uptown Village at Cedar Hill) is a 615,000-square-foot (57,100 m^{2}) open-air regional shopping mall in Cedar Hill, Texas, a suburb of Dallas in the United States. It is located at FM 1382 and U.S. Highway 67 adjacent to Uptown Boulevard and Pleasant Run Road.

== History ==
The MGHerring Group broke ground on the project in June 2006 and it opened on March 12, 2008. Uptown Village at Cedar Hill was the first mall to open in the suburban region of Dallas County known as the Best Southwest, which includes the cities of Cedar Hill, DeSoto, Duncanville, and Lancaster. Prior to its opening, there was only one mall in southern Dallas County – Southwest Center Mall (formerly Red Bird Mall) in the Red Bird neighborhood of Dallas.

Fort Worth-based Trademark Property Company acquired the development in July 2014. Five months later, the company and its joint venture partner secured $38.3 million in refinancing to update the center. The upgrades included improved connectivity for both pedestrian and vehicular traffic, new signage, enhanced landscaping, and the redevelopment of public spaces.

As part of the new management's rebranding process, Uptown Village was renamed Hillside Village in the spring of 2015. The new name and corresponding new brand were selected to reflect the garden-like look and feel planned in the multimillion-dollar property renovation as well as paying homage to the community in which it lies.

== Tenants ==
- Anchors
  - Dillard's 149,720 sq ft (13,910 m^{2})
  - Dick's Sporting Goods 53,037 sq ft (4,930 m^{2})
  - Barnes & Noble Booksellers 29,750 sq ft (2,760 m^{2})
- Other key tenants include: Charlotte Russe, Charming Charlie, Buckle, H&M (opened October 2015), Express, James Avery, Old Navy, Papaya, The Children's Place, Victoria's Secret, Menchie's Frozen Yogurt, and GameStop.

== Design ==
Unlike a traditional mall, Hillside Village was designed in the new urbanism style to be pedestrian-friendly and has architectural features reminiscent of Texas town squares. Other shopping centers in the Dallas-Fort Worth Metroplex with this similar design include the Firewheel Town Center in Garland, Southlake Town Center in Southlake, and The Shops at Legacy in Plano.

There are a variety of unique amenities including a Village Green with a performance stage and an interactive water fountain, a 2,500-square-foot (230 m^{2}) children's play area, and an oversized chess and checkers board.

== See also ==
- List of shopping malls in the Dallas/Fort Worth Metroplex
