= Casa Linda Shopping Center =

Shopping Center

Coordinates: 32.8334°N 96.7002°W

Casa Linda Plaza, its official name, was the brainchild of Carl Martin Brown and his son Howard D. Brown. The East Dallas family farm land of 600 plus acres was purchased in 1937. The abstract completed at that time traces the ownership of the land back to the original owner who had been rewarded the land for his service in the Battle Of San Jacinto by the then governor of Texas in 1836. The history of the land as it went from owner to owner was colorful. At one point part of the land was traded for a black female slave of 25 years of age. The Brown family still has the original abstract of 1937 in their possession and plans to gift it to a Dallas Museum in 2020 for safe keeping and for others to study it.

This land was developed to become the premier place to live and shop at the Garland Road and Buckner Blvd Crossroads in East Dallas.

Carl Brown started buying the land in the early 1930s and eventually owned over 1,000 acres of prime residential and commercial property in East Dallas. Building was started before World War II and resumed after Howard Brown returned from his active duty in WWII in February 1946. Due to the war, construction materials had been in short supply and Carl Brown waited until his son was home to help him renew their efforts to finish building the Plaza and additional homes surrounding it. At the point of building the center out and all the area homes, Corinne Brown Walton, Carl's only daughter was called in to run the family office. Along with three other ladies Corinne kept the ship on course all those years till her death of cancer in 1973. Corinne was a very integral part of this family endeavor.

Among the first tenants were Tom Thumb grocery store, Mott's variety store, C & S Hardware, Skillern's drug store, Reynolds-Penland, El Fenix (restaurant), Zenith Televisions, Ashburn's Ice Cream, Wyatt's Cafeteria, Parisian-Peyton's, Colberts, Mr and Mrs Gift Shop, Vavra's Bakery store, Time Jewelers, Jackson's Sporting Goods, Varsity Shop, DeGeorge's barbecue, Fred's barbecue, Maple Shop (furniture), Southern Maid donuts, Texas State Optical, and a Fix It Shop.

Hopkins-Shafer purchased the property in the 1980s and painted the buildings bright pink. Since then, the center went through several changes in ownership. In 2008, the shopping center changed hands again, selling to a company called AmREIT, which began renovating the center in March 2008. According to the company website, the firm "desires to restore this great center back to its original grandeur. (AmREIT owns all of the shopping center, with the exception of the theatre.) This premier property has tremendous traffics counts, a highly populated area surrounding it, significant barriers-to-entry and an emerging demographic. It is truly a property worth revitalizing with updated features, new tenants and a sense of place for its east Dallas neighbors."

The Casa Linda Cafeteria unexpectedly closed in 2007 shortly after the property was sold. It reopened as the Highland Park Cafeteria in May 2007.

The Highland Park Cafeteria was unfortunately forced to close permanently, during the summer of 2020, due to the coronavirus pandemic. All furniture, equipment, signage, etc. was auctioned off. With the shuttering of Highland Park Cafeteria’s last existing location, it brought to an end their 95-year legacy.

EDENS, a national retail real estate developer, purchased the shopping center in 2015.

== See also ==
- List of shopping malls in the Dallas–Fort Worth Metroplex
