= The Shops at Willow Bend =

Shopping mall in Plano, Texas

Coordinates: 33°1′51″N 96°49′57″W

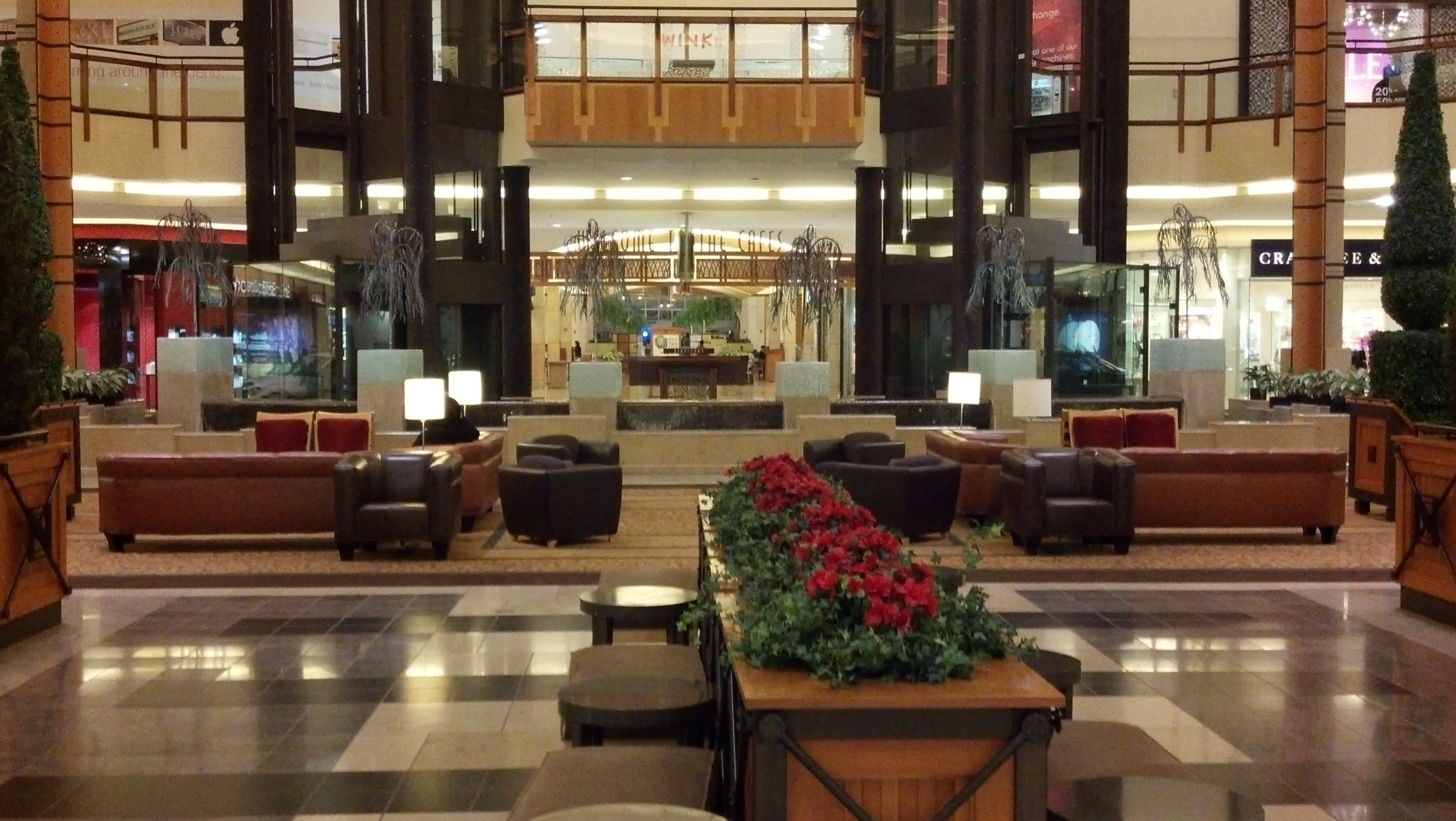
- Center court (2013)
- Location: Plano, Texas, U.S.
- Address: 6121 W Park Boulevard (FM 544)
- Opened: August 3, 2001; 25 years ago
- Renovated: 2018
- Closed: Early 2027 (enclosed mall)
- Developer: Taubman Centers
- Manager: Centennial Real Estate
- Owner: Centennial Real Estate
- Architect: JPRA Architect
- Num. of stores: 10
- Num. of anchor tenants: 4 (2 open, 2 vacant), originally 5
- Floor area: 1,391,000 sq ft (129,200 m^{2})
- Floors: 2 (3 in former Dillard's, former Macy's, and Neiman Marcus)
- Parking: 6,900 spaces
- Public transit: DART: 239
- Website: www.shopwillowbend.com

The Shops at Willow Bend, informally Willow Bend Mall, is a shopping mall in Plano, Texas. The mall was located at the intersection of West Park Boulevard (FM 544) and Dallas North Tollway in western Plano, approximately 1 mile (1.6 km) north of President George Bush Turnpike.

Willow Bend was the last enclosed shopping mall built in the state of Texas, opening in 2001 as an upscale shopping center. The mall struggled throughout its life due to economic recessions, poor occupancy rates, and heavy competition with the nearby Galleria Dallas, Legacy West and Stonebriar Centre. As of May 2026, most of the mall is set to be demolished for a mixed-use redevelopment project, dubbed The Bend, that will feature retail, residential, and office space, as well as a potential arena for the Dallas Stars hockey team.

== History ==
=== Opening ===
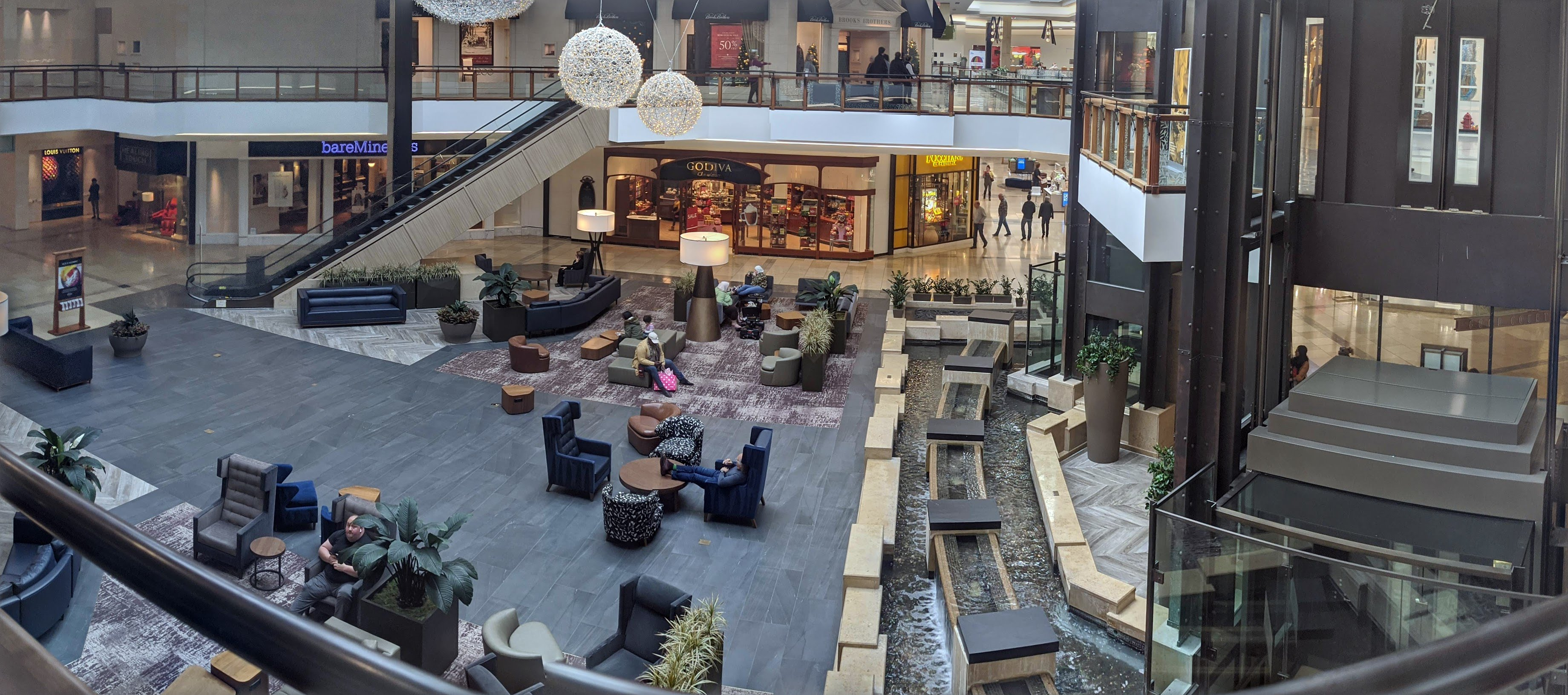
Center court viewed from second floor (2020)

The Shops at Willow Bend was a $200 million project developed by Taubman Centers, which was highly selective in accepting tenants. Despite being designed with over 1.5 million square feet (140,000 m^{2}) of space, management originally limited the mall to upscale stores which would appeal to an affluent clientele.

The mall opened on August 3, 2001, with about 70% occupancy. An estimated 250,000 visitors showed up to the mall during its opening weekend. The mall was anchored by Foley's (later Macy's), Dillard's, Lord & Taylor, and Neiman Marcus, with the latter two serving as replacements for stores at the nearby Prestonwood Town Center. A fifth anchor, Saks Fifth Avenue, planned to open in 2003.

=== Early years ===
Willow Bend faced several challenges from the beginning. The mall opened shortly before the September 11 attacks, which caused nationwide retail sales to slow considerably, as well as the dot-com-fueled collapse of the Telecom Corridor, which had been one of the wealthier parts of Willow Bend's trade area. The mall also suffered from heavy competition due to its location on Dallas North Tollway: Galleria Dallas, located 7 miles (11 km) south, was an established upscale mall with its own set of high-end tenants, while Stonebriar Centre, located 6 miles (9.7 km) north, offered a wider selection of shops and amenities, including mid-range shops.

In 2003, Lord & Taylor was closed when the chain exited the North Texas market; its store building would go on to be demolished. Saks Fifth Avenue would open in 2004, one year after its planned date.

In August 2010, Saks Fifth Avenue announced it would shutter its Willow Bend store in favor of its store at Galleria Dallas. In 2011, Crate & Barrel opened in a new building on the former Lord & Taylor anchor pad. Unlike Lord & Taylor's original store, Crate & Barrel did not directly connect to the mall's interior.

=== Early renovation plans ===
In 2014, the mall was sold as part of a 7-property package to Starwood Capital Group for approximately $1.4 billion. The following year, Starwood announced a $100 million renovation to the mall, which would add an office tower, a hotel, and a restaurant district in place of the Saks Fifth Avenue pad. Starwood stated that the renovation was intended to broaden the mall's target market beyond luxury shoppers.

In June 2017, Legacy West, an upscale open-air mixed-use development, opened 4.4 miles (7.08 km) north of the mall, increasing competition for high-end retail and shoppers. Stores such as J. Crew and Louis Vuitton eventually relocated their former Willow Bend stores there.

In March 2018, the 60,000-square-foot Crayola Experience opened between Macy's and the food court. Additionally, the first phase of the renovation, an open-air restaurant district named The District at Willow Bend, opened in October 2018. The next planned phase would include a 10-screen Cinépolis theater, an Equinox fitness club, and an office tower.

In March 2019, Apple announced the closure of Apple Stores at Willow Bend and Stonebriar Centre, allegedly to reduce the risk of patent trolling in the lawsuit-friendly Eastern District Court of Texas. The stores permanently closed in April, with a new store at Galleria Dallas serving as a replacement.

In March 2020, Starwood Retail lost ownership of the mall due to being unable to refinance a $135.7 million loan. The mall was transferred to its lender and placed under the management of property manager Trigild. All redevelopment work was immediately stopped, including the movie theatre, which was 85% complete. Plans for other components of the redevelopment, such as an office tower and boutique hotel, were abandoned, and the movie theatre was never completed.

=== Redevelopment and closure ===
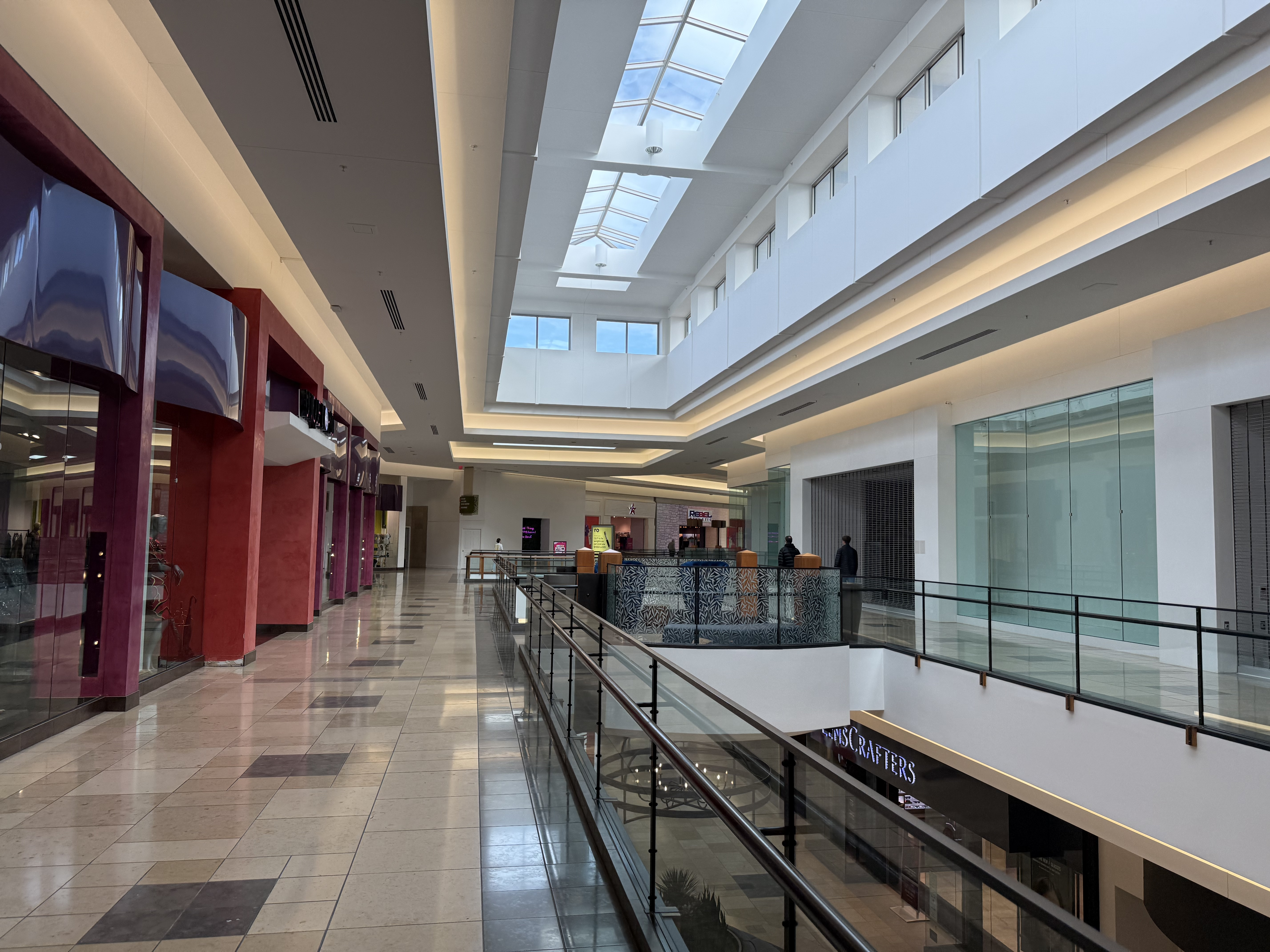
Vacant upper level of former Macy's concourse (2025)

In May 2022, the mall was purchased by Centennial Real Estate, which planned to redevelop the mall into a mixed-use development, with financial backing from Cawley Partners and Waterfall Asset Management. Redevelopment plans were announced in April 2023. Under the proposal, dubbed The Bend, the Dillard's wing of the mall would be demolished and replaced with an open-air shopping center, a 7-story office building, and three apartment complexes totaling 960 units. Construction would start in 2025.

In January 2025, Macy's announced that its Willow Bend location would close on March 23. Following the announcement, Centennial updated their plans to demolish the Macy's wing instead of Dillard's. The updated plans were approved by Plano city council in February.

In September, Saks Global announced its plans to close the Neiman Marcus store in January 2027. Two months later, Dillard's announced its plans to close in January 2026. On February 7, 2026, Crayola Experience was temporarily closed due to delinquent rent. The attraction re-opened on February 28 but closed permanently on March 8.

In February 2026, Fox 4 News reported that the City of Plano had been in discussions with the Dallas Stars of the National Hockey League (NHL) to build a new arena at The Bend as part of the redevelopment. In March 2026, Centennial revised its plans again to demolish the entire mall interior, leaving only Equinox, Crate & Barrel, The District, and the mall's parking structures. Demolition is expected to begin within the next 12 months, and tenants inside the mall have been given notices to vacate their spaces in preparation for redevelopment. In June 2026, the Plano City Council approved development plans for a new arena for the Stars. However, in November 2026 Plano voters rejected a proposition that would have allowed the city to implement venue taxes to fund its $700 million share of the cost for the venue. Plano City Manager Mark Israelson stated the city will now have to reassess the proposed financing plan.

By the end of August 2026, most of the mall's remaining tenants were required to vacate, and portions of the property were scheduled to transition to redevelopment beginning September 1. After 25 years of operation, the majority of the mall's tenants shuttered permanently on August 31, 2026. The mall remains open for mall walkers and patrons of a few remaining tenants which have been given extensions on their deadline to vacate, with portions of the indoor mall closing beginning October 1st. The entrances from the District and the North Parking Garage are expected to remain open until early 2027.
