= Sunset Mall =

- Location: San Angelo, Texas
- Coordinates: 31.42769°N 100.49911°W
- Address: 4001 Sunset Drive
- Opened: 1979
- Developer: Paul Broadhead & Associates
- Owner: Jones Lang LaSalle
- Num. of stores: 70
- Num. of anchor tenants: 9 (8 open, 1 vacant)
- Floor area: 559,684 square feet (52,000 m^{2})
- Floors: 1

Sunset Mall is a shopping mall located in San Angelo, Texas. The anchor stores are Marshalls, JCPenney, Ulta Beauty, and two Dillard's stores.

== History ==
The mall opened in 1979, featuring JCPenney, Sears, H. J. Wilson Co., Bealls, and Hemphill-Wells. The concourses were designed with fiberglass skylights that let in natural light. One year after the mall opened, its design received an award from the Dallas chapter of American Institute of Architects. Hemphill-Wells was bought out by Dillard's in 1986. H. J. Wilson was later sold to Service Merchandise, which closed in 1999. In 2006, Dillard's opened a second store in the former Service Merchandise building.

Old Navy opened at the mall in 2000 and closed ten years later. A year later, Marshalls moved into the space, while Shoe Dept. was expanded and Ulta Beauty opened in a space vacated by Luby's.

On November 2, 2017, Sears announced that its store would be closing as part of a plan to close 63 stores nationwide. The store closed in January 2018.
