= Richland Mall (Texas) =

- Location: Waco, Texas, US
- Coordinates: 31.51636°N 97.18863°W
- Address: 6001 West Waco Dr
- Opened: March 19, 1980
- Developer: Jacobs-Kahan and Company
- Owner: CBL & Associates Properties
- Num. of stores: 95
- Num. of anchor tenants: 7
- Floor area: 708,249 square feet (65,798.5 m^{2})
- Floors: 1 (2 in main Dillard's)
- Parking: 3884
- Website: www.richlandmall.com

Richland Mall is a 708,249-square-foot (65,798.5 m^{2}) regional shopping mall in Waco, Texas owned by CBL & Associates Properties located on 77 acres (31 ha). The mall opened in 1980. It has 95 stores with five anchors. The anchor stores are JCPenney, Dick's Sporting Goods, 2 Dillard's stores, Tilt Studio, and Shoe Dept.

The mall contains two Dillard's stores, one of which was originally H. J. Wilson Co. and later Service Merchandise.

On December 28, 2018, it was announced that Sears would be closing as part of a plan to close 80 stores nationwide. The store closed in March 2019. Dillard's has since renovated the former Sears space and moved one of its stores into it. The new store opened in May 2020. The old Dillards anchor space was occupied by Overstock Furniture & Mattress shortly after Dillards moved their store.

Bealls' parent company announced in September 2019 that it would be converting the Bealls name to Gordmans. However, in May 2020, Gordmans announced that it was filing for Chapter 11 bankruptcy and that it would be closing all locations as the chain is now going out of business. The location was filled by a Tilt Studio family entertainment center in 2021.
