= San Jacinto Mall =

- Location: Baytown, Texas, United States
- Coordinates: 29°47′59″N 94°59′4″W
- Address: 1496 San Jacinto Mall
- Opened: March 4, 1981 (45 years ago)
- Closed: January 4, 2020 (6 years ago)
- Demolished: 2019-late 2022
- Developer: Herring Group
- Manager: Fidelis Realty Partners
- Owner: Fidelis Realty Partners
- Num. of stores: 14 (formerly 100+)
- Num. of anchor tenants: 9
- Floor area: 1,156,000 sq ft (107,400 m^{2})
- Floors: 1 with partial upper level (2 in Macy's, former Sears, and former Service Merchandise)

San Jacinto Mall was a regional shopping mall located in Baytown, Texas, United States. It was last managed by Fidelis Realty Partners. The mall had a gross leasable area of 1,156,000 sq ft (107,400 m^{2}). The mall ceased operations on January 4, 2020 and will be redeveloped into an outdoor shopping destination. The mall was anchored by Sears, JCPenney, Macy's, Montgomery Ward, Mervyn's, Service Merchandise, Bealls, Palais Royal, and Ashley HomeStore.

== History ==
On December 8, 1978, plans for the mall were announced, with the mall breaking ground in August 1979. The mall opened its doors in 1981. At the time, the mall was relatively large for the immediate market area but nonetheless successful. In the central area of the mall was a JCPenney and the food court coined "The Market". The other wings each had one anchor and one junior anchor: a northwest wing, originally anchorless until Mervyn's filled the vacant pad in 1985, along with Wilson's (which became Service Merchandise in 1985) as junior anchor, a southwest wing with Foley's and Palais Royal as junior anchor, a southeast wing with Montgomery Ward and junior anchor Bealls, and a northeast wing bearing a Sears and junior anchor The Fair.

Over the years, the mall had trouble competing with the many new, big box stores that had sprung up along Garth Road, south of the mall. Service Merchandise and Montgomery Ward closed in 2001 (both due to a countrywide company liquidation). Bealls also vacated the same year. The next major loss happened in early 2006, when Mervyn's closed all of its stores in the Houston area. In addition to the southeast wing, the northwest wing of the mall was also now anchorless. Soon after, a proposal was rendered by NewQuest Properties to demolish both the southeast and northwest wings and transform them into "lifestyle" additions. Foley's was rebranded as Macy's in September 2006. In November 2006, Triyar Cos. LLC, owned by the Yari family, put the mall and several other Greater Houston malls up for sale; the company allowed a buyer to either buy an individual property, or buy all of them at once.

In October 2019, with only 14 stores remaining in what is left of the mostly demolished mall, property management informed the tenants that the mall will be ceasing all operations at the end of the year. The mall did finally close after 38 years on January 4, 2020. Demolition started in 2019, and was completed in late 2022.

In October of 2024, Fidelis broke ground on San Jacinto Marketplace which will feature an open green area with patio restaurants and a number of shopping and entertainment options, as well as residential and healthcare in the future.
