= Richardson Square Mall =

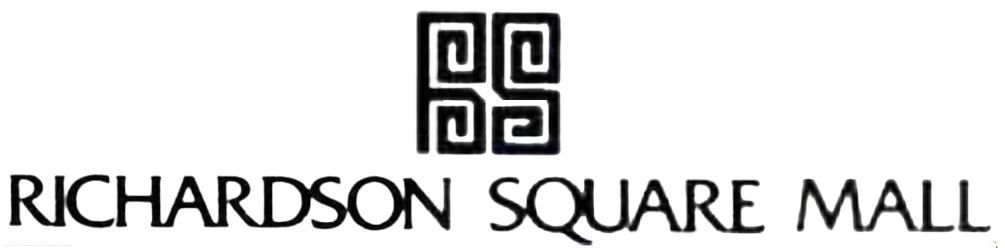
- Location: Richardson, Texas, United States
- Coordinates: 32°56′30″N 96°41′50″W
- Opened: 1977; 49 years ago
- Closed: 2006; 20 years ago
- Demolished: 2007; 19 years ago
- Developer: Edward J. DeBartolo Corporation
- Num. of anchor tenants: 0 (4 at its peak)
- Floor area: 992,549 square feet (92,210.8 m^{2})
- Floors: 1

Richardson Square Mall was an enclosed single-level shopping center located in Richardson, Texas on Plano Road, stretching between the intersections of Belt Line Road and Spring Valley Road, that was in business from 1977 to 2006. The mall attached to an existing Sears, which served as one of four anchor stores. Two anchors, including Sears, were single-level, while the others were two level.

The mall was popular and fully leased throughout the 1980s. It fell into decline in the early 1990s, with a large percentage of stores unoccupied by 1993. The mall was remodeled in 1998 with a food court and the spaces of many individual stores stores combined into larger retailers such as Barnes & Noble and Stein Mart. Beginning with Montgomery Ward's bankruptcy in 2001, retailers began abandoning the mall, with some relocating to Firewheel Town Center in nearby Garland.

Richardson Square Mall closed in 2006 and was demolished in 2007. It was replaced in 2008 by an outdoor retail center with the abbreviated name Richardson Square. The Sears became part of Richardson Square and remained in operation until 2019.

== History ==
The 139,000 ft² Sears building opened on March 6, 1974, preceding the mall as a standalone store. Richardson Square Mall opened three years later along Plano Road, with Sears becoming one of its anchors, in addition to Montgomery Ward, Dillard's, and Titche-Goettinger. While the mall, Sears, and Montgomery Ward were single-level, the other two anchor locations were each two stories. Titche-Goettinger became Joske's in 1979.

During its peak in the 1980s, the mall included the Richardson Square I-II-III movie theater (owned by General Cinema), a video game arcade across from it, two bookstores (Waldenbooks and B. Dalton), and two music stores (Musicland and Camelot Music). Food vendors were grouped in the entrance corridors at each end of the mall–by Sears (Hot Sam Pretzels, Bresler's Ice Cream, Karmelkorn) and Montgomery Ward (Chick-fil-A, Orange Julius).

The mall was closed on Sundays until September 1, 1985, when the Texas blue law was repealed.

In 1981, the much larger Collin Creek Mall opened in nearby Plano, but Richardson Square remained popular and fully occupied throughout the 1980s. An L-shaped, freestanding strip of stores was built in 1984–85 on the outer corner of the property closest to Lloyd V. Berkner High School.

In 1987, the Joske's chain was purchased by Dillard's, and the Joske's location in the mall became a second Dillard's. Dillard's maintained both two-level stores until it closed the latter in 1995.

In the late 1980s, General Cinema built a six screen expansion of the Richardson I-II-III theater adjacent to the mall, across Plano Road, while also keeping the original in-mall location.

=== Decline ===
Stores began rapidly closing in the early 1990s. By 1993, the property's occupancy rate was 60%. A new tenant during this phase was French bakery Cafe Partier.

In 1998, the mall was remodeled, with many new tenants, including Barnes & Noble bookstore, which occupied the space of multiple stores. A food court was added. The entrance corridor near Sears, formerly occupied by a movie theater, arcade, and several food vendors, became a Stein Mart.

In 2001, Montgomery Ward filed for bankruptcy and closed its stores. The former Ward's pad was demolished and replaced with a Super Target, which opened shortly thereafter, in 2002. Stein Mart, Oshman's, and several smaller stores soon closed as well. When Garland's Firewheel Town Center opened in 2005, Dillard's, Old Navy, and Barnes & Noble all relocated to Firewheel.

The mall closed in 2006. It was announced that the mall would be demolished, and Simon Properties announced plans to renovate the site. Richardson Square Mall was demolished in 2007, except for Sears, which remained in operation as part of the subsequent Richardson Square retail center.

== Richardson Square ==
The Richardson Square retail center includes former anchor of the mall Super Target with an internal Starbucks, Ross Dress for Less, Shoe Carnival, a Lowe's home improvement store, and external pad sites.

On December 28, 2018, it was announced that Sears would be closing as part of a plan to close 80 stores nationwide. The store closed on March 10, 2019. The Sears building is scheduled to be demolished in 2025.

However, in late 2024-25 VN Holdings Group has invested up to $20 million to renovate the former Sears building preventing demolition but instead looking to redevelop the site into an open air shopping center, anchored by AEON and Daiso with the addition of open air walkways and 20+ new store fronts for future tenants expected to be announced once redevelopment is completed.

The New Richardson Square Development is expected to be completed early as Late 2025 with new tenants expected to move in when construction is completed. Lowe's, Target, Ross Dress For Less and Shoe Carnival are expected to remain.
