= Post Oak Mall =

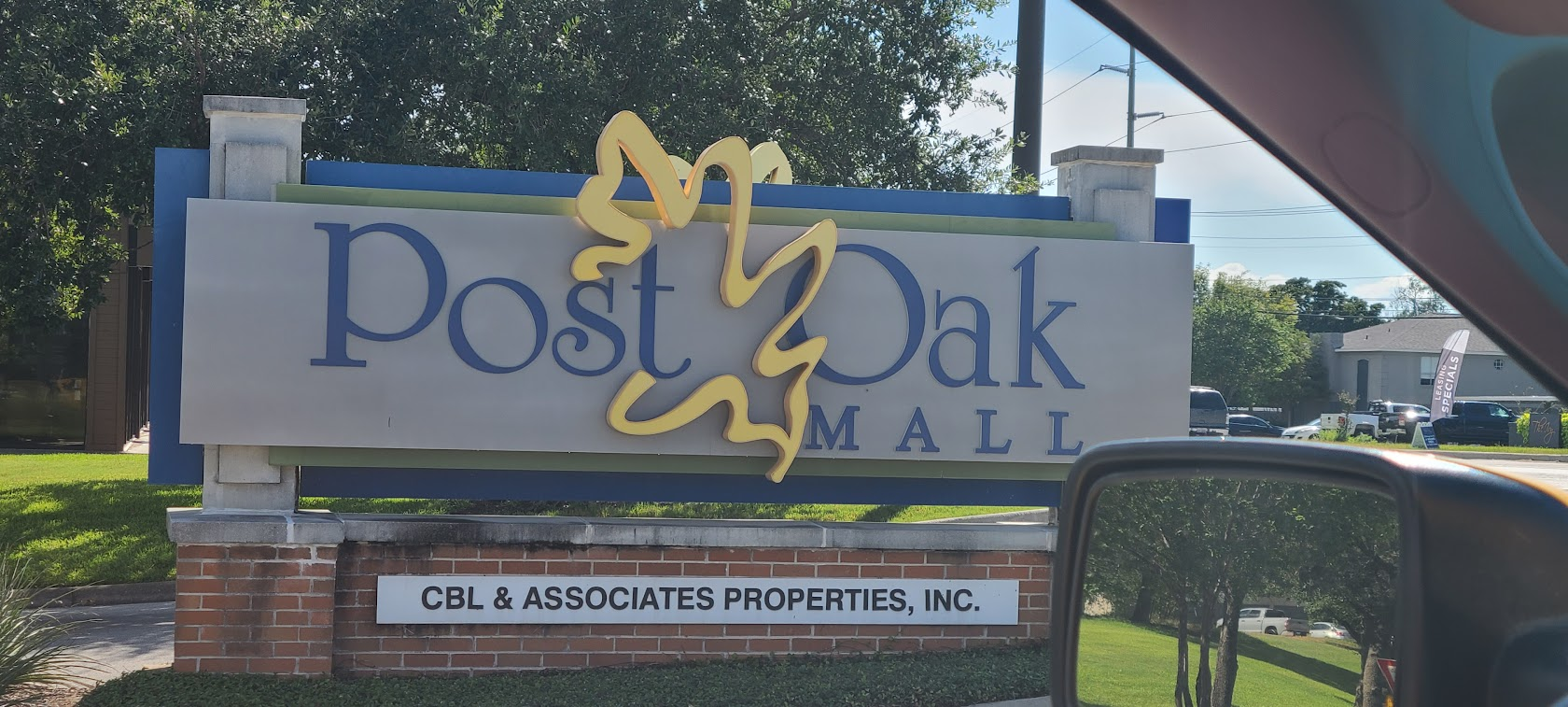
- Location: College Station, Texas, United States
- Coordinates: 30.6245°N 96.3034°W
- Address: 1500 Harvey Road
- Opened: February 17, 1982
- Developer: CBL Properties
- Manager: Paul Loy
- Owner: CBL Properties
- Architect: Architectonics Inc.
- Num. of stores: 125
- Num. of anchor tenants: 6 (5 open, 1 vacant)
- Floor area: 776,898 square feet (72,176.2 m^{2})
- Floors: 1 (2 in former Macy's)
- Parking: 5228
- Website: postoakmall.com

Post Oak Mall is a regional shopping mall in College Station, Texas, United States, owned by CBL & Associates Properties. Construction on the mall began in summer 1979 and it opened February 17, 1982. It initially housed 80 stores with four anchors. A second phase, planned before the mall even opened, was completed in 1985, adding more floor space and bringing the mall up to 125 stores and six anchor stores. As of 2015, it also houses a small food court and two restaurants. The anchor stores are two Dillard's stores, Dave & Buster’s, Murdoch’s Ranch & Home Supply, and JCPenney. There is one vacant anchor store that was once Macy's.

The first mall to be opened in College Station, Post Oak is the largest mall within the Brazos Valley area. At its opening, it became the city's largest employer, and nearly doubled its city sales tax revenues. Though the mall generated additional traffic and added to the demand on city services, it also generated $1 million in annual sales tax revenue, $120,000 in property taxes, and a half-million in taxes for the city school district. It is credited with creating the first major impetus for growing economic and commercial developments for College Station, which previously lacked a major retail community. The mall generates over 75 percent of the area's retail sales through its approximately eleven million annual visitors. It remains the city's largest taxpayer and its second largest employer. It is also the top employer of the students of nearby Texas A&M University.

== History ==
=== Beginnings ===
In the early 1980s, the demand for shopping opportunities and other businesses was growing with the populations of the side-by-side cities of Bryan and College Station. The city and developer CBL & Associates Properties began making plans for the opening of a large regional mall in the area, with the first choice of location being in Bryan near the intersection of Earl Rudder Freeway (Texas State Highway 6) and Briarcrest Drive (FM 1179). However, the owner of the land refused to sell. With the city unable to procure the land, the mall project was shifted to College Station. Construction began on Post Oak Mall in the summer of 1979 at the intersection of Earl Rudder Freeway and Harvey Road. Developer CBL & Associates Properties hired Eugene "Buck" Schimpf to act as the project manager. Architectonics Inc. was hired to design the mall. More than 1,000 workers were employed to help construct the mall, with the project "monopolizing the local (construction) trade" at the time.

Post Oak Mall opened its doors on February 17, 1982. Spanning 800,000 square feet (74,000 m^{2}), the first phase of the mall contained approximately 80 stores, including four anchors: the area's first Foley's and Dillard's department stores; Sears, which relocated from its smaller Bryan location; and H. J. Wilson Co. In addition to the stores, the mall contained a three–screen Plitt-branded movie theater and a food court with fifteen small restaurants and a 300-person seating area. The mall walkways were decorated with a variety of small potted trees and plants in large atrium areas, with tiered glass ceilings above. A copper-piping fountain that emitted water in a "dandelion bubble" dominated one end of the building. Plans were already underway for a second phase of construction that would expand the mall to hold up to 130 stores and push it up to 1,020,000 square feet (95,000 m^{2}).

At the time of its opening, it was the largest mall complex developed by CBL. In the first year, it was projected that the mall would employee 2,500 employees—instantly making it the largest employer in the city; this was expected to expand to 3,500 with the completion of the second phase. It was hoped it would generate $80 million in sales. In addition to helping to retain local shoppers who might otherwise travel the 2½ hours southeast to Houston for mall shopping, CBL and city officials expected the mall would draw shoppers from around the Brazos Valley. Before its opening, the city did not have a highly developed retail community. With the planned additions, College Station city manager North Bardell said it was expected to generate $1 million in annual sales tax revenue, nearly equal to what the city collected in the previous fiscal year from all other sales. It would bring in another $120,000 in property taxes, a half-million in taxes for College Station Independent School District, and $1 million in electric bills. The increase in jobs was seen as good for the community, and the city hoped it would attract new civic groups to the area. Taking a year longer than originally planned, the expansion was completed in 1985.

The mall also added new burdens to city services, with building inspectors having to work overtime to inspect each store area as it was completed. While mall security was issued citation books so they could issue parking tickets directly, the city police still had to work double shifts to cover the traffic during the mall's opening weekend. Overall, the mall increased traffic on the Earl Rudder Freeway, and city traffic engineers noted it would cause more traffic backup. Traffic signals were added to the mall's main entrance, while long-term plans were made to both expand the freeway and add additional interchanges along Harvey. Traffic studies were implemented to study the traffic after the mall's opening to developed additional plans to mitigate issues. There were concerns that the mall would be the final blow to the downtown area of neighboring city Bryan, Texas, which was already suffering reduced business after the opening of smaller Manor East Mall and the Townshire shopping center, both within Bryan. Bryan city officials noted an immediate decrease in revenue due to Sears moving from Bryan to College Station, taking $50–100,000 of sales taxes with it. However, as a whole the city was hopeful that the mall would have benefits to the city in the form of increased city growth as a whole. The city planners felt it would only be a passing fad for local rural and lower-income families, who would still return to downtown Bryan due to its proximity.

=== Renovations ===
On February 1, 2004, a short in an electrical box sparked a small fire at the Journeys shoe store. The sprinklers helped contain the flames, but eight stores and six kiosks in the area of the store suffered from smoke damage, as well as water damage after water from the sprinklers flowed out of the store and into the middle of the mall walkway. The affected stores had to be closed for two days while repairs were made.

In 2006, Anuncio Digital Media, a locally started digital advertising firm, installed its first mall-based digital signage network, which consists of a series of twenty plasma screen televisions around the main concourse and in the food court that display six-second sound-free advertisements. Post Oak Mall was the first of four CBL-owned malls to receive this network, with four other CBL malls scheduled to follow. The advertising displays were activated on September 1, 2006.

David Gwin, the economic development director for College Station, is working with the mall on a possible $8.5 million renovation project to give the mall a further boost. As of 2008, details about what the renovations would entail have not been released. In February 2009, the city noted that plans had been designed to renovate both the interior and exterior of the mall.

On January 19, 2012, CBL Properties announced, among others, that Post Oak Mall would receive major renovations sometime during 2012. In CBL's press release, they announced that "The renovation at Post Oak Mall will involve modern updates including new flooring and paint as well as all new amenities such as soft seating areas and décor, updated entrances, and lighting. In addition, the food courts at Cross Creek Mall, Turtle Creek Mall and Post Oak Mall will receive completely new designs, including new tables and chairs." Renovations were completed in November 2012 with a grand reopening held the weekend of November 9, 2012.

== Stores ==
While the bulk of Post Oak Mall's 125 stores are clothing and accessory shops, as of 2009 it is home to several hair salons and cosmetic stores, two video game stores, two optical shops, a Dallas Cowboys Pro Shop, a store featuring Texas A&M merchandise (Aggieland Outfitters), and a pet store that primarily sells puppies imported from Canada. In addition to six food vendors in the central food court, the mall houses full-size Casa Olé and Chuck E. Cheese's restaurants, and kiosk versions of Auntie Anne's and Dippin' Dots. There is a small indoor children's play area located in the food court, a night club, and recruitment centers for the United States Air Force, Army, Navy, and Marines.

When it opened, the mall contained a three-screen movie theater owned by Cineplex Odeon, which was later bought out the Plitt chain. The Post Oak Mall theater location was eventually sold to Carmike Cinemas before closing for good by 1999. The empty space was replaced with a full-service restaurant and an entertainment section.

=== Anchors ===
The first four anchor stores in the mall were Sears, Dillard's, Wilson's, and Foley's. Bealls, became the fifth anchor when it opened a second location in Post Oak a few weeks after the mall's opening. The sixth anchor was added in 1985, when JCPenney moved into the newly expanded mall from its Bryan Manor East Mall location. In 1985, the H. J. Wilson Company, owner of Wilson's, was taken over by Service Merchandise. After Service Merchandise went bankrupt in 1999, the Wilson's location closed and the empty anchor location became a second Dillard's location, housing their specialty Mens & Housewares store. Both Dillard's locations, Foley's, JCPenney, and Sears were all independently owned, separate from mall ownership, and considered "stand-alone" buildings for tax purposes.

After May Department Stores, the parent company of Foley's, merged with Federated Department Stores, the Foley's location was temporarily closed while it was converted to a Macy's department store. The new Macy's officially opened on September 9, 2006. With the opening of its 30,000-square-foot (2,800 m^{2}) location on August 5, 2005, Steve & Barry's became the mall's only anchor store to have no exterior exit. In September 2008, after Steve & Barry's declared bankruptcy, the Post Oak store was closed as part of the parent's company attempt to save its business, but it went out of business altogether less than three months later.

On August 22, 2018, it was announced that Sears would be closing as part of a plan to close 46 stores nationwide. The store closed in November 2018.

On March 17, 2020, Bealls was converted into Gordmans. Just two months later on May 19, 2020, it was announced that Gordmans would also be closing due to parent company Stage Stores going out of business.

In 2020, Conn's HomePlus opened in the former Sears anchor store.

On January 5, 2021, it was announced that Macy's would be closing in March 2021 as part of a plan to close 46 stores nationwide.

In 2025, Dave & Buster’s announced they would be opening an arcade inside one of the vacant anchor stores. Construction began on the arcade in 2026 and the location is expected to open in late 2026.

=== Food court ===
Post Oak Mall's food court contains seven food stall vendors. The mall's food court offers a Charley's Philly Stakes, a burger place, an Asian restaurant, a pizza stall, a locally operated Taste of the Tropics, a maker of pure fruit smoothies, and a Nestlé Toll House Café. The stalls arranged around half of a semi-round area, retail stores along the other half, and openings to the mall concourse on both ends.

A McDonald's was located in the mall for fifteen years, but left in 2002 as part of regional owner Ron Blatchley's overall renovation plans. It was quickly replaced by the Brazos Valley seventh Sonic Drive-In location, the only in the area with neither a drive-in nor drive-through option. The Sonic closed in late 2012.

== Gallery ==
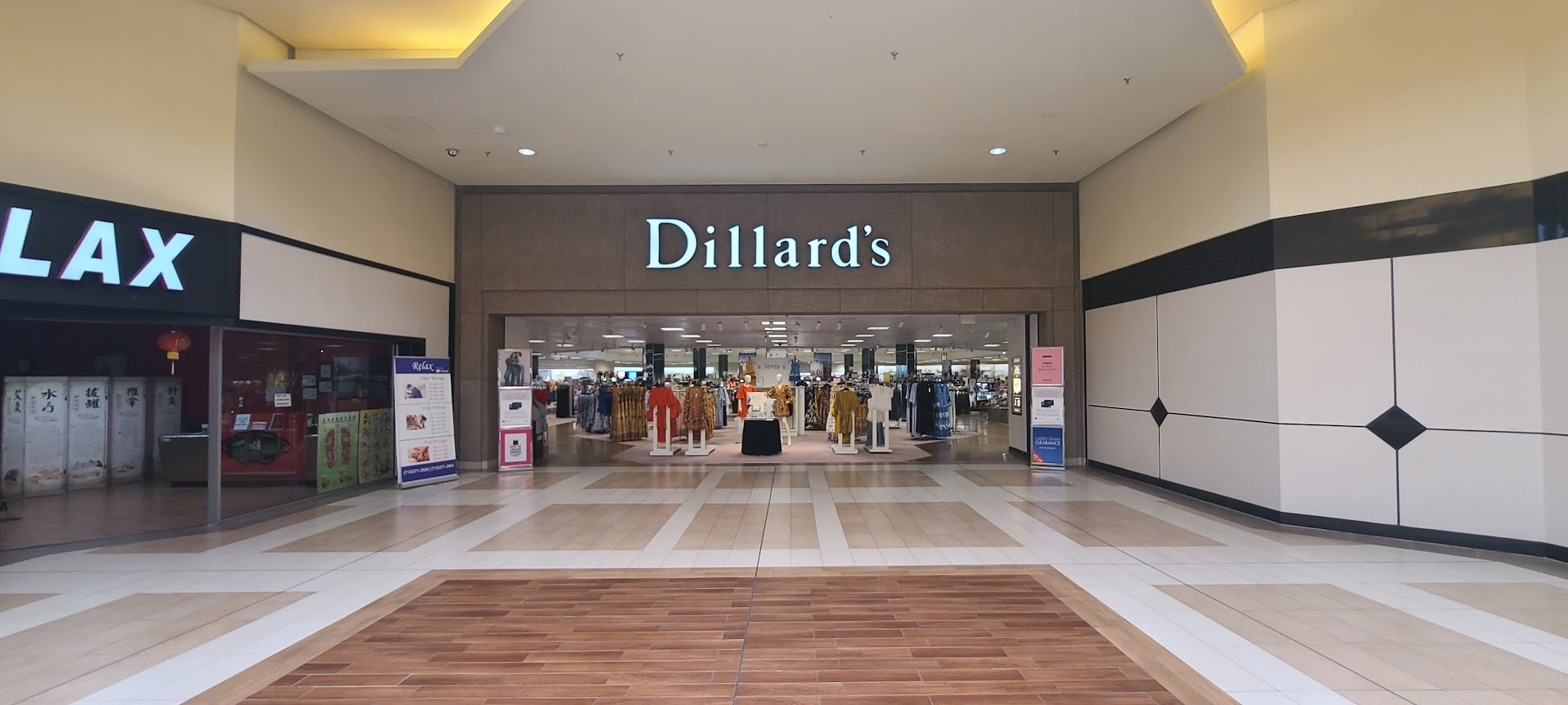
Dillard's Womens' Entrance, August 2025

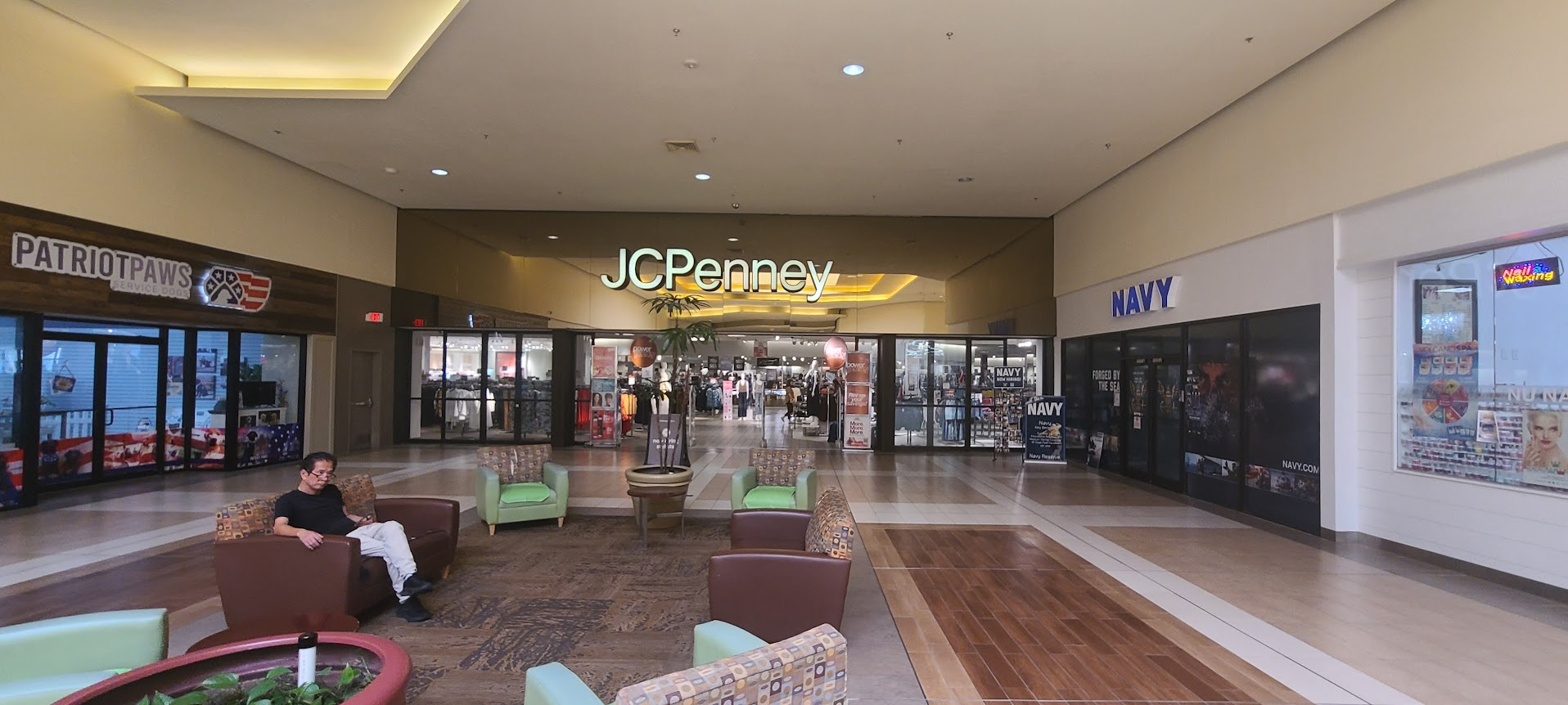
JCPenney Entrance, August 2025

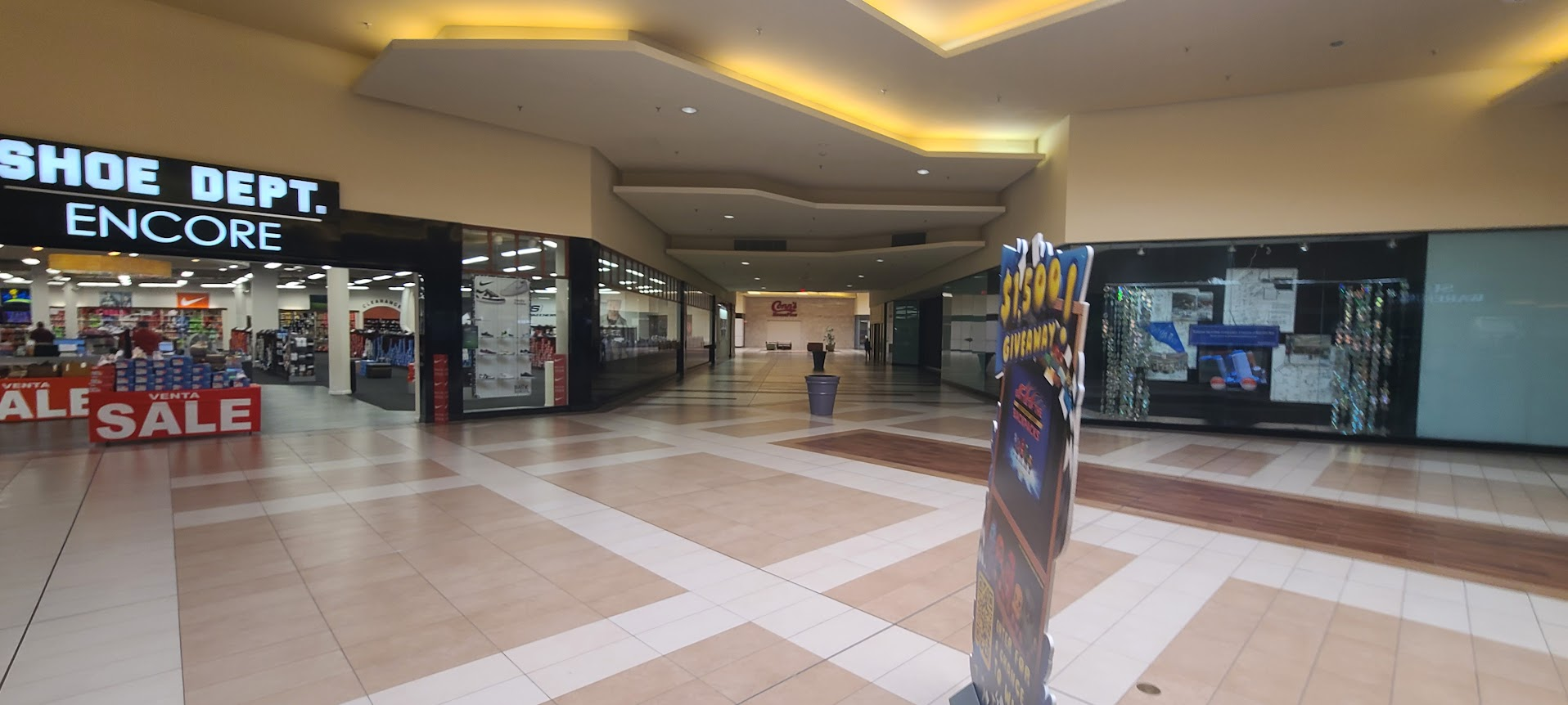
Former Foley's / Macy's / Conn's Wing, August 2025

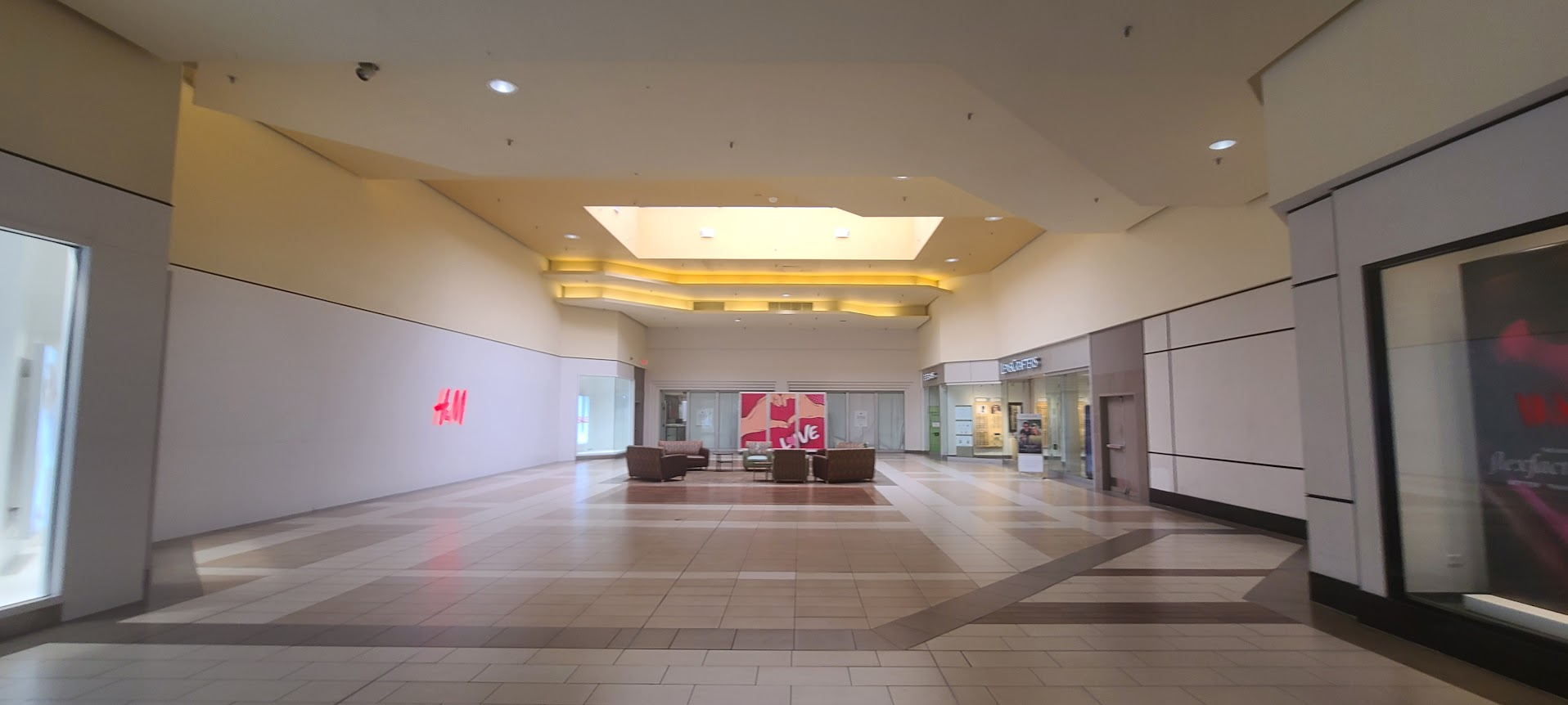
Former Foley's / Macy's Entrance, August 2025

== Economic impact ==
Post Oak Mall was the first mall in the city of College Station, and as of 2008, it is the largest mall in the Brazos Valley. There were concerns that the mall would hurt existing area businesses, but CBL was certain the mall would have a "trickle-down" effect that would result in the Harvey Road area to be "fully developed with smaller strip shopping centers." Before the mall opened, plans were already underway for one such center, Post Oak Village, which began constructed to the west of the mall along Harvey Road. Farther west, zoning was approved for new office complexes and commercial developments. Immediately south of the mall, an additional commercial zone was approved, along with 36 acres (15 ha) along the freeway.

The mall's opening helped create the impetus for growing economic and commercial developments for College Station. Before its opening, the city did not have a highly developed retail community. It is now the largest taxpayer in College Station, and the second largest in the Brazos Valley, even though the anchor stores are freestanding units that are privately owned and taxed separate from the mall proper. Over 75 percent of retail sales in the Brazos Valley coming from sales at the mall's stores and it continues to be one of the area's largest employers as well as being the largest employer for Texas A&M University students. As predicted, the Harvey Road/Earl Rudder Freeway intersection became a major entry point into College Station, with Harvey Road now boasting a long stretch of retail businesses and restaurants. It is considered an "area of bustling activity" by the city. According to Joan Ghani, the marketing director of the mall, the mall sees eleven million visitors walk through its door annually. While the large college population from Texas A&M University boosts the mall's revenue, the average mall shoppers are in their 30s and come from both within the Brazos County and the twelve surrounding counties.
