= Firewheel Town Center =

Shopping center in Garland, Texas

Coordinates: 32°57′12.00″N 96°36′42.00″W

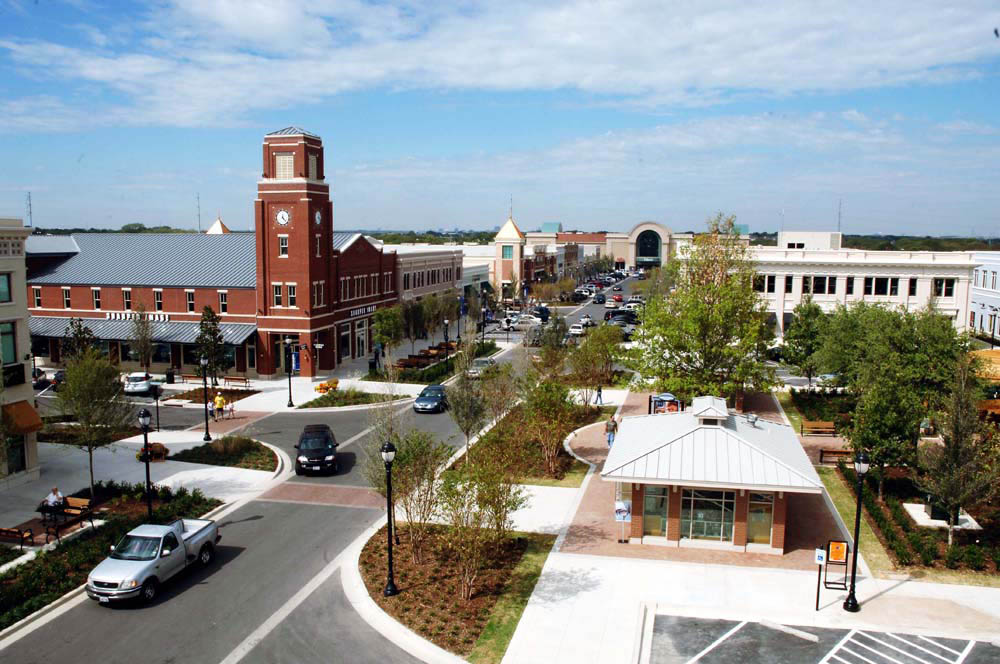
- Location: Garland, Texas, United States
- Opened: October 7, 2005; 21 years ago
- Owner: Simon Property Group
- Num. of stores: 124
- Num. of anchor tenants: 2
- Floor area: 998,347-square-foot (92,749.5 m^{2})
- Floors: 1
- Website: www.simon.com/mall/firewheel-town-center

Firewheel Town Center is a 998,347-square-foot (92,749.5 m^{2}) open-air regional shopping mall in Garland, Texas. The mall is located on the northeast corner of President George Bush Turnpike and State Highway 78. The mall features Dillard's, Macy's, Dick's Sporting Goods, and Barnes & Noble, in addition to an AMC Theatres.

The mall opened on October 7, 2005. Although "coming soon" signs first appeared in 1984, actual construction did not begin until early 2003. It was completed in 2005 and is owned by the Simon Property Group. Unlike a traditional mall, Firewheel Town Center was designed in the new urbanism style. Similar area shopping centers include Southlake Town Square, The Shops at Legacy, Uptown Village at Cedar Hill, The Shops at Highland Village, and The Village at Allen.

The Firewheel name comes from the nearby Firewheel Golf Park, which in turn is named for a flower that grows naturally in the area.

== See also ==
- List of shopping malls in the Dallas/Fort Worth Metroplex
