= Stonebriar Centre =

Shopping mall in Frisco, Texas

- Facade of Stonebriar Centre, 2026
- Location: Frisco, Texas, United States
- Coordinates: 33.099257°N 96.811476°W
- Address: 2601 Preston Rd; Frisco, TX 75034
- Opened: August 4, 2000; 26 years ago
- Developer: General Growth Properties
- Manager: GGP
- Owner: GGP
- Num. of stores: 224
- Num. of anchor tenants: 10
- Floor area: 1,727,698 sq ft (160,508 m^{2})
- Floors: 3
- Website: www.shopstonebriar.com/en.html

Stonebriar Centre, commonly referred to as Stonebriar Mall, is a super-regional mall located at the intersection of Preston Road (SH 289) and the Sam Rayburn Tollway (SH 121) in Frisco, Texas. The mall features Macy's, Nordstrom, Dillard's, JCPenney, and Dick's Sporting Goods, as well as a 24-screen AMC movie theater and a food court with a carousel.

== History ==
View of the east wing from the second story (2026)

In 1988, Homart, a then-subsidiary of Sears, planned to develop a million-square foot mall in Frisco, which consisted of roughly 6,000 people at the time.

When Plano city officials learned of Homart's plan, they offered $10 million if the company decided to move its planned mall across Texas Route 121 into their city limits. However, Frisco lobbied to keep the planned mall and negotiated tax incentives to close the deal. Plano then convinced another company, General Growth Properties, to place a mall within their city limits. In 1995, General Growth acquired Homart, who had already signed an agreement with Frisco. The City of Frisco made a final offer to General Growth of a half-cent sales tax rebate, property tax abatement for ten years, and infrastructure improvements in and around the mall. Plano continued to lobby hard for the new mall and Frisco eventually upped its sales-tax grant. Frisco finally opened Stonebriar Centre on August 4, 2000.

In 2016, the mall's AMC theatre located on the upper levels was shuttered for three months for updating and remodeling.

In May 2018, construction began on the 18-story Stonebriar Hyatt Hotel which would be attached to the mall. It opened to the public in June 2020.

In the fall of 2019, KidZania opened its first location in the United States.

== Former tenants ==
- Galyan's (converted to Dick's Sporting Goods in 2004)
- Foley's (May Department Stores bought out by Federated; all Foley's stores rebranded as Macy's)
- Sears (plan to convert to Dick's House of Sport in 2026)

== See also ==
- List of shopping malls in the Dallas/Fort Worth Metroplex
