= Midway Mall (Texas) =

- Location: Sherman, Texas, United States
- Coordinates: 33.6875°N 96.5850°W
- Address: 4800 Texoma Pkwy
- Opened: 1986
- Developer: Melvin Simon & Associates
- Manager: Mustard Street Management
- Owner: Mustard Street Management
- Num. of stores: <5 (70+ at peak)
- Num. of anchor tenants: 5 (2 open, 3 vacant)
- Floor area: 606,494
- Floors: 1
- Parking: 3,451

The Midway Mall is the only shopping mall in the areas of far North Texas and Southern Oklahoma. The mall is also the only mall outside of the greater Dallas/Fort Worth area and central Oklahoma. The mall sits about one mile east of US Highway 75. The Sherman and Denison, Texas, area has a population of about 150,000.

== History ==
The site of the Midway Mall was originally a Sears, with the rest of the property being developed around it. The Midway Mall opened in 1986 with the anchor stores Dillard's, Bealls, JCPenney, Mervyn's, and Sears. In 2007, the Midway Mall lost its JC Penney, after the chain moved four miles south to the Sherman Town Center. On August 20, 2010, it was announced that the mall would be sold to TNP Sites after the Simon Property Group managed the property for 24 years. On June 6, 2017, Sears announced that it would be closing its Sherman store and Auto Center. This was one of 70 properties that the company announced would close. The store closed early in September 2017. Within the last 10 years, the Midway Mall has become a dead mall, as it has been documented on various YouTube channels. On May 6, 2021, the city of Sherman announced there was a contract to sell the mall. According to the Grayson County Assessor, the property is valued at $1.5 million and is no longer for sale, it was purchased by Mustard Street Management. Repairs are currently being worked on in phases, the first repair was replacing air conditioning.
