= Brazos Mall =

- Location: Lake Jackson, Texas, United States
- Coordinates: 29.04905°N 95.46219°W
- Address: 100 Highway 332 West
- Opened: 1976 (50 years ago)
- Developer: The MGHerring Group
- Architect: The MGHerring Group; Dal Pos Architects
- Num. of stores: 74
- Floor area: 680,000 sq ft (63,000 m^{2})
- Floors: 1
- Website: shopbrazosmall.com

Brazos Mall is a shopping mall located in Lake Jackson, Texas. It is the only major enclosed shopping mall in Brazoria County, Texas. The mall opened in 1976 after nearly two years of development by The MGHerring Group. The loan for the mall was originated and is serviced by Bradford Allen Capital.

Sears closed at the mall in 2017. After it closed, the mall owners announced that TJ Maxx & HomeGoods and Ashley HomeStore would occupy part of the space.
