= Clearfork =

Mixed-use development in Texas

Coordinates: 32.7098°N 97.4005°W

Clearfork is a mixed-use development on 470 acres (1,900,000 m^{2}) in Fort Worth, Texas, part of the larger Edwards Ranch development. The development consists of over 1,000,000 sq ft (92,903 m^{2}) across eight structures.

== The Shops at Clearfork ==
The Shops at Clearfork is a complex developed and managed by Cassco Development Co. and Simon Property Group, Inc, featuring offices, entertainment options, upscale retail and dining. The center opened in 2017, and is anchored by Neiman Marcus, which relocated from its previous Fort Worth location at Ridgmar Mall.
