= H. J. Wilson Co. =

Former catalog showroom chain

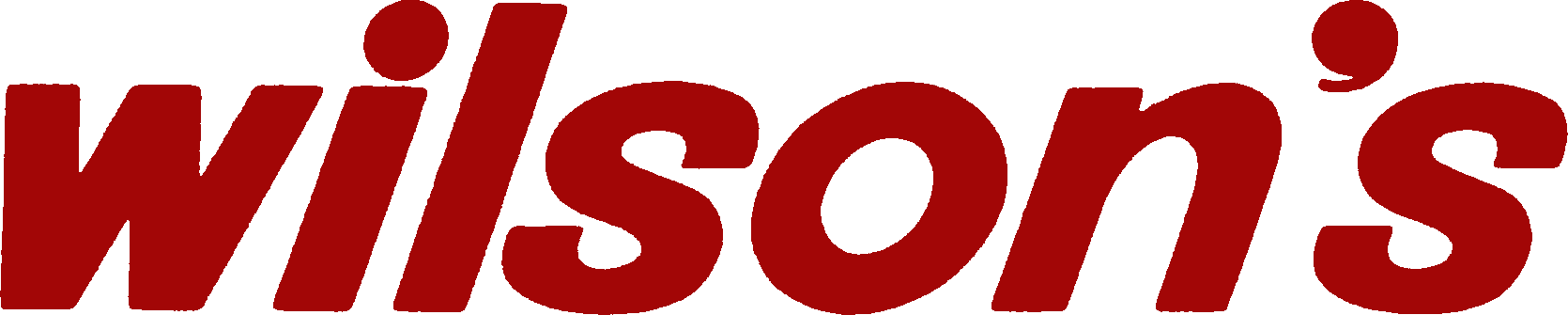
- Trade name: Wilson's
- Industry: Retail
- Founded: 1947
- Founder: Huey John Wilson
- Defunct: 1985
- Fate: Acquisition by Service Merchandise
- Successor: Service Merchandise
- Headquarters: Baton Rouge, Louisiana
- Number of locations: 80
- Area served: Southern United States
- Products: Jewelry

H. J. Wilson Co., also known as Wilson's, was an American catalog showroom chain based in Baton Rouge, Louisiana. Founded in 1947 as a jewelry store, it was acquired in 1985 by Service Merchandise.

== History ==
The store was begun by Huey John Wilson in 1947 as a jewelry vendor in Baton Rouge, Louisiana. Ten years later, Wilson opened his first catalog showroom. By 1982, Wilson's was the third-largest catalog showroom chain in the United States. At its peak, it had 80 stores in 12 states. In 1985, rival chain Service Merchandise purchased all 80 of the Wilson's stores.

Wilson died on February 8, 2008, at age 80.
