= Sanger Harris =

Former department store chain in the Dallas–Fort Worth metroplex

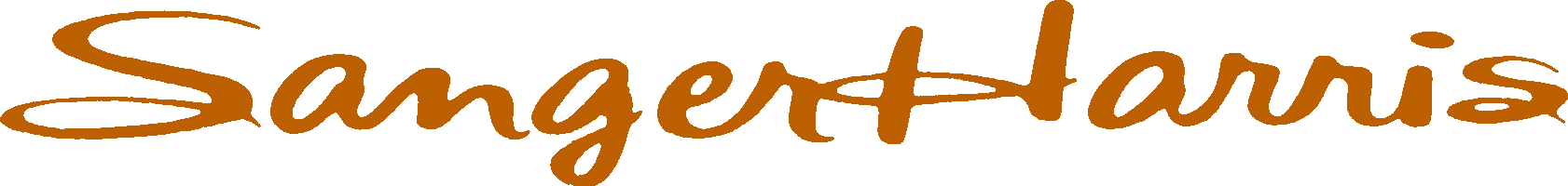

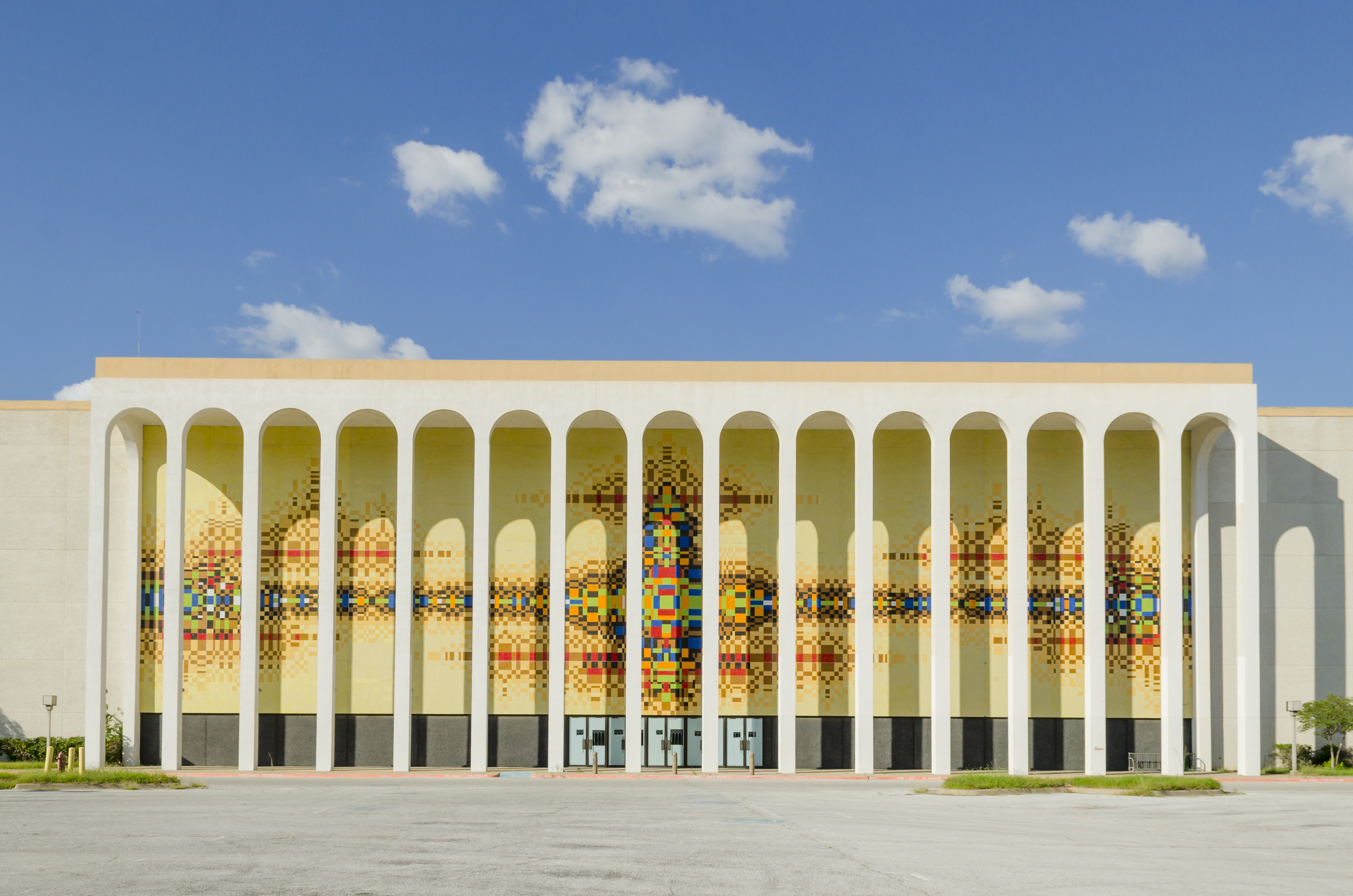
- Entrance to former Sanger Harris building at Valley View Center (opened 1973, closed 2008, demolished 2019)
- Type: Department store
- Industry: Retail
- Founded: 1961; 65 years ago
- Defunct: 1987
- Fate: Merged with Foley's
- Successor: Foley's; Macy's
- Headquarters: Dallas, Texas
- Products: Clothing, footwear, bedding, furniture, electronics, jewelry, beauty products, housewares
- Parent: Federated Department Stores, Inc.

Sanger Harris (previously styled as Sanger-Harris) was a department store chain based in Dallas, Texas. The chain was owned by department store conglomerate Federated Department Stores and was formed from the 1961 merger of two Dallas-based chains, Sanger Brothers and A. Harris and Co., both dating back to the 19th century.

At its height, the chain owned 20 stores, most in the Dallas–Fort Worth metroplex with some additional stores in Oklahoma and Arizona. In 1987, Federated merged Sanger Harris into its Houston-based Foley's chain, which itself would be merged into Macy's in 2006. Most former Sanger Harris stores have been demolished or remodeled.

== History ==
Sanger Harris of Dallas, Texas, was the result of the 1961 merger of then four-unit Sanger Brothers Dry Goods Company of Dallas, founded in 1868 by the five Sanger brothers and acquired by Federated Department Stores in 1951; and the two-unit A. Harris and Company of Dallas, founded in 1887 and acquired by Federated in 1961.

In 1965 the company built a new downtown Dallas store to replace the flagship stores of the two companies and, so the business legend goes, turned down the opportunity to move into a new shopping center called NorthPark Center. During the late 1970s, the chain dropped the hyphen between 'Sanger' and 'Harris' (rumored as a way to differentiate from hometown rival Neiman-Marcus), and continued as an upper-moderate shopping destination. In January 1987 it was merged into the Foley's division; the combined division was sold to The May Department Store Company the next year. Most locations are now Macy's since 2006 when Federated Stores bought out The May Department Stores Company in 2005.

== Architecture ==
Sanger Harris stores are known for their distinctive architectural styling, featuring large white marble columns and an abstract mosaic crafted from 1-inch (2.5 cm) tiles. This design was introduced with the 1965 downtown flagship, which had the columns and mosaic covering three sides of the store. Future stores, starting with the 1970 store at Six Flags Mall, emulated this design at smaller entryways, with mosaic designs that were, with a few exceptions, unique to each store. Many of the mosaics were designed by Brenda Stubel, one of the first female architects in Dallas.

The mosaic and columns were present at most Sanger Harris department stores constructed between 1965 and 1982. Most of these stores have since been demolished or remodeled; for example, the downtown flagship still features its marble columns, but the tiles were removed when it was renovated into an office building. The only mosaics remaining are at the Hulen Mall, Woodland Hills Mall, and The Shops at RedBird locations. Efforts to preserve the mosaics at demolished locations, such as Valley View Center and Collin Creek Mall, have failed due to the murals' thick asbestos-based stucco and lack of a metallic lath resulting in high removal, cleaning, and preservation costs.

== Locations ==
=== Sanger Brothers (1868–1961) ===
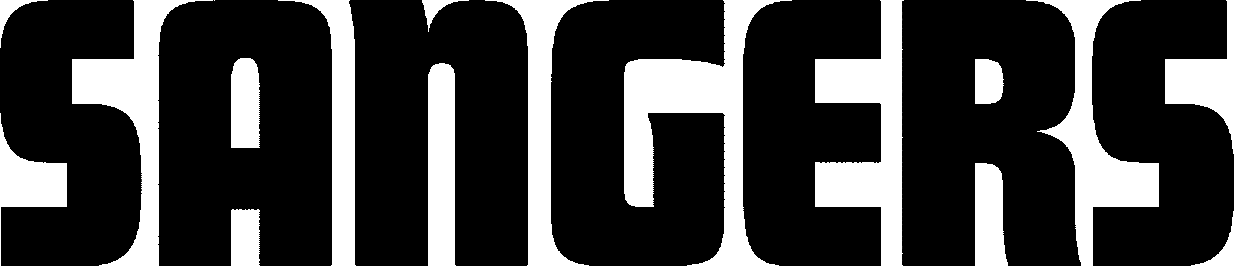
Sanger Bros. logo before merger

Location	Years of operation	Notes
Downtown Dallas; Elm St./Lamar St./Main St. block Dallas	1870s–1965	This store was open until the new replacement Sanger-Harris location opened at Pacific/Akard in 1965; this building is now the El Centro College campus of the Dallas County Community College District (DCCCD).
Highland Park Village; Highland Park	?–1987	This location was retained by Foley's. The building was later a Sakowitz location. Now other retailer(s) occupy the space.
Big Town Mall; Mesquite	1959–1987	This location closed after the Foley's merger; it was torn down when the mall was razed.
Preston Center; Dallas	?–1987 (Foley's until 2001)	Foley's retained this location until they moved to NorthPark Center. It was then subdivided for occupancy by multiple tenants.

=== A. Harris & Co. (1887–1961) ===
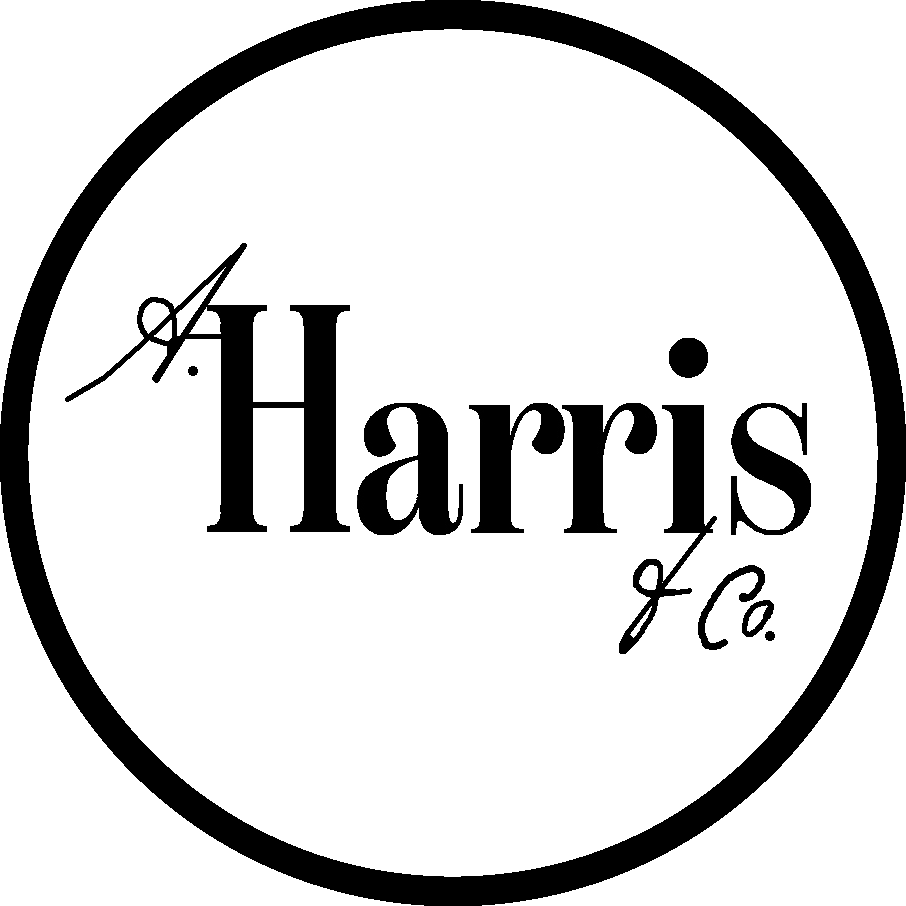
A. Harris Co. logo before merger

Location	Years of operation	Notes
Downtown; Main and Akard St. (Kirby Building); Dallas	?–1965	This store was open until the new replacement Sanger-Harris location opened at Pacific/Akard in 1965; it is now an apartment building.
A. Harris Center; Beckley Ave. at Kiest Blvd. Dallas	?–1975	This store was retained as a Sanger-Harris location until the opening of the Red Bird Mall (later Southwest Center) location; it is now Nolan Estes Plaza, part of the Dallas Independent School District.

=== Sanger-Harris (1961–1987) ===
First post-merger logo engraved on the columns of the former flagship store. This engraving was retained by DART.

Location	Years of operation	Notes
Plymouth Park; Irving	1963–1987	This location was closed (Foley's moved to a former Joske's store at Irving Mall). The property was sold to a neighboring church and the building was later razed.
Downtown (flagship store); Pacific and Akard St. Dallas	1965–1987 (Foley's until 1990)	Foley's retained this location until it closed in 1990; it is now the headquarters for Dallas Area Rapid Transit.
Six Flags Mall; Arlington	1970–1987 (Foley's until 2005)	Foley's closed this location, which was torn down in late 2016 along with much of the mall property.
Town East; Mesquite	1971–1987 (Foley's until 2006; Macy's to present)	Foley's retained this store, which is now a Macy's. However, the mosaics were removed.
Valley View Center; Dallas	1973–1987 (Foley's until 2006; Macy's until 2008)	Foley's, and later Macy's, retained this location initially. It has since closed and was demolished, 2017–19.
Southwest Center (previously Red Bird); Dallas	1975–1987 (Foley's until 2006; Macy's until 2017)	This location was retained by Foley's and Macy's until 2017 when the store closed.
Hulen Mall; Fort Worth	1977–1987 (Foley's until 2006; Macy's to present)	This location was retained by Foley's and Macy's.
North Hills Mall; North Richland Hills	1979–1987 (Foley's until 2001)	Foley's closed this location when it moved to nearby North East Mall. The building was torn down when mall property was razed.
Collin Creek Mall; Plano	1980–1987 (Foley's until 2006; Macy's until 2017)	This location was retained by Foley's and Macy's until 2017 when the store closed. The building was demolished in 2019.
Sanger Harris Plaza; Tyler	1982–1987 (Foley's until 2006; Macy's until 2017)	This location was retained by Foley's and Macy's until 2017 when the store closed. The building was remodeled into a Hobby Lobby and Mardel Christian bookstore.
Southroads; Tulsa	~1980–1987 (Foley's until ~1992)	This location originally opened as a Woolco in 1967. After the hand over, it was renovated with the characteristic columns and a mosaic. Foley's retained the store till 1992 and later relocated to the Promenade mall The store and mall were torn down and the property redeveloped in the early 2000s.
Southland Shopping Center (now Woodland Hills); Tulsa	1982–1987 (Foley's until 2006; Macy's to present)	This location was retained by Foley's and Macy's. This was the last location to feature Sanger Harris mosaics, which are still visible on the north facade.
Crossroads; Oklahoma City	1986–1987 (Foley's until 2006; Macy's until 2008)	Originally opened as John A. Brown 1974–1984, Foley's 1986-2006, and later Macy's (2006-2008) retained this location. The building was later used as an auto parts warehouse. As of 2022, the site is being converted for use as a private charter school.
Quail Springs; Oklahoma City	1986–1987 (Foley's until 2006; Macy's until 2016)	Originally opened as John A. Brown 1980–1984, Foley's 1986-2006, and later Macy's (2006-2016) retained this location until February 2016 when it was closed. This structure was later demolished in spring 2017 to make room for a free-standing Lifetime Fitness building to be built in the store's original parking lot. The former upper-level entrance into the mall is now another direct outside entrance to the mall (the original direct outside entrance is just a few feet away and still in use). The former lower level has also been demolished and filled in. The spot where the department store building itself once stood is now a parking lot for both the mall and Lifetime Fitness.
Foothills; Tucson	1985–1987 (Levy's until 1985; Foley's until 1994)	Retained by Foley's initially, mall now repurposed with outlets
El Con; Tucson	1985–1987 (Levy's until 1985; Foley's until 1997; Robinsons-May until 2006; Macy's until 2007)	Retained by Foley's initially, later a Robinsons-May, then a Macy's, now demolished for a Walmart Supercenter
Coronado Center; Albuquerque	1984–1987 (Foley's until 1988)	Foley's initially retained this store, later closed the store, then returned still later to another space in the mall (formerly Goldwater's and May D&F); now this location is a JCPenney.

== In popular culture ==
- In early episodes of Dallas, the downtown Dallas store was used for filming in two different storylines:

- When a lowly young woman agrees to give up her baby to Sue Ellen (played by Linda Gray), Sue Ellen visits a department store to shop for baby clothes and related items. Pam (Victoria Principal) sees Sue Ellen and wonders why she is there. Sue Ellen tries to pass it off as getting baby items to give to charity. Later Sue Ellen can be seen walking in front of the downtown Dallas store, with bags in her hand clearly displaying the Sanger Harris logo and design. Then, she goes to drop off the bags with the mother and finds J.R. (Larry Hagman) there instead.
- Pam decides she wants to work outside the home, visits "the store" for a job interview with her friend Liz Craig (Barbara Babcock); the downtown Dallas store facade can clearly be seen as Pam approaches the front door of the store. After Pam snags the job, later views of the downtown Dallas store's side entrance on Akard St. can be seen used to introduce scenes of Pam at work.

- In the 1986 movie True Stories, a fashion show takes place at the mall in Virgil, Texas. As the scene is about to begin, the camera pans by a mall's exterior. A Sanger Harris store building can be seen, among others. This exterior actually belonged to Big Town Mall in Mesquite.
- During Dallas showings of The Rocky Horror Picture Show, audience members would sing the Sanger Harris jingle "You can always tell a Sanger Harris man". This was done when Dr. Frank-N-Furter came down the elevator in heels and fishnet stockings.
- Prank call comedian Lucius Tate often pretended to be a collection agent from Sanger Harris when calling his victims.

== See also ==
- Levy's
- Neiman Marcus
- Sanger, Texas
- Titche's
- List of department stores converted to Macy's
- List of defunct department stores of the United States

== Bibliography ==
- Rosenberg, Leon Joseph (1978). Sangers': Pioneer Texas Merchants. Texas State Historical Association. ISBN 0-87611-037-5.
- Meyer, Lasker M. (2011). Foley's (Images of America). Arcadia Publishing. ISBN 978-0-7385-7928-3.
