= Big Town Mall =

Former shopping mall in Mesquite, Texas

- Location: Mesquite, Texas, United States
- Coordinates: 32.7954°N 96.6719°W
- Address: 800 Big Town Shopping Center
- Opened: 1959
- Closed: 2001 (Demolished Summer 2006)
- Owner: Kimco Realty Corp.
- Floor area: 585,595 sq ft (54,400 m^{2})
- Parking: 3,801 spaces

Big Town Mall was a shopping mall located in the Dallas suburb of Mesquite, Texas. Built in 1959, it was the first enclosed shopping mall in the Southwest. Its last anchor tenant (Montgomery Ward) closed in March 2001, and it was demolished in 2006.

== History ==
Big Town Mall, just off of U.S. 80 E. and Loop 12 in Mesquite, Texas, was constructed in 1959 and was the first enclosed, air-conditioned shopping mall in the Southwest. Some of the surrounding facilities included Bowlanes, A&R Course, General Cinema, Horse and Rider, an exhibition hall, and a half price shoe store. At one time up to three major chain stores--JCPenney (which James Cash Penney himself opened), Sanger-Harris, and Montgomery Ward—were part of the complex. The attached Woolworth's was also popular due to its sizable inventory and food court.

This once-popular spot in Mesquite housed department stores, retail shops, an early form of arcade, and even a movie theater (which has since been demolished). Even after Town East Mall had long since become the new "hotspot" for local and national retailers, the mall stayed active for several years with privately owned shops targeting urban young.

=== Film appearance(s) ===
The exterior of the mall can be seen in the 1986 film True Stories as the site of the fashion show. The interior of the mall shown is actually NorthPark Center in Dallas.

=== Decline ===
The mall would keep all of its anchor stores occupied until 1989, when Foley's (in the former Sanger-Harris) was shuttered; it would never be re-occupied. Further closings occurred in the 1990s with a multitude of inline tenants leaving the plateauing mall behind, the mall's Woolworth's would jump ship in 1993. Montgomery Ward, the last remaining anchor store, was closed after going bankrupt in 2001, thus sealing the mall's eventual demise.

=== Humanitarian use ===
In September 2005, Big Town Mall was designated a staging point for the victims of Hurricane Katrina coming to Dallas for shelter and relief. From there, they traveled along I-30 to I-35 to settle in Reunion Arena and the Dallas Convention Center where they were housed until able to return to their homes in Louisiana. The mall's parking space was utilized as a first stop for evacuees – where authorities searched for weapons, screened them for medical conditions, gave them a light snack and passed them along to any number of shelters in Dallas, Fort Worth, Irving, Grand Prairie and even Oklahoma City.

=== Demolition ===
In early 2006, the decision was made to tear down the mall. The demolition project started on the week of May 22, 2006, and was completed in September of that year.

As of September 13, 2011, the Big Town Bowling Lanes were demolished. The only remaining structure on the property is the Exhibition Hall. The Exhibition Hall was remodeled in 2013 to retain current use for shows and conventions. In 2016, the remainder of the site was purchased by FedEx to develop a major distribution hub.
