= Sanger Brothers Complex =

- U.S. National Register of Historic Places
- U.S. Historic district – Contributing property
- Dallas Landmark Historic District; Contributing Property
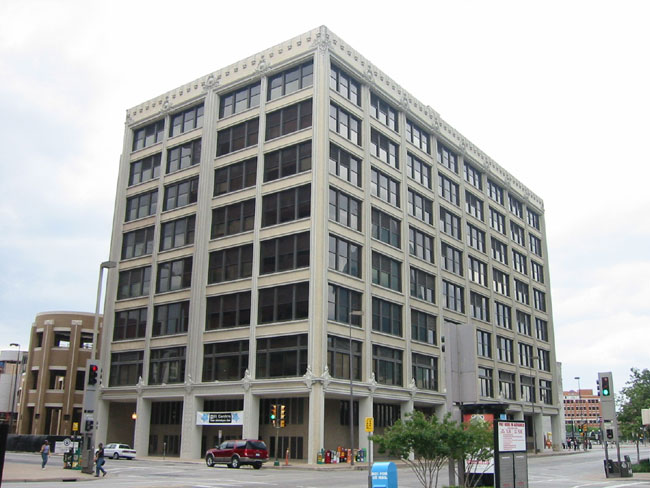
- Sanger Brothers Building in 2004

- Location within Texas Location within the United States
- Location: Block 32, bounded by Elm, Lamar, Main and Austin Sts., Dallas, Texas
- Coordinates: 32°46′47″N 96°48′15″W
- Area: 1 acre (0.40 ha)
- Built: 1884
- Architect: Lang & Witchell
- Architectural style: Italianate, Romanesque, Sullivanesque
- Part of: Westend Historic District (ID78002918)
- NRHP reference No.: 75001967
- DLMKHD No.: H/2 (West End HD)

Significant dates
- Added to NRHP: April 8, 1975
- Designated CP: November 14, 1978
- Designated DLMKHD: October 6, 1975

The Sanger Brothers Complex is a historic building in Downtown Dallas, Texas. The building, located on Lamar Street between Elm and Main, was the flagship location of the Sanger Brothers department store chain.

In 1965, four years after Sanger Brothers was merged with A. Harris & Co. into Sanger–Harris, the store was closed and replaced by a new flagship at Pacific and Akard. The building was purchased by the Dallas County Community College District and converted into the main building of El Centro College.

It is listed on the National Register of Historic Places as part of the Dallas Landmark Historic District.

== See also ==
- National Register of Historic Places listings in Dallas County, Texas
- List of Dallas Landmarks
