= Hulen Mall =

Shopping mall in Fort Worth, Texas, U.S.

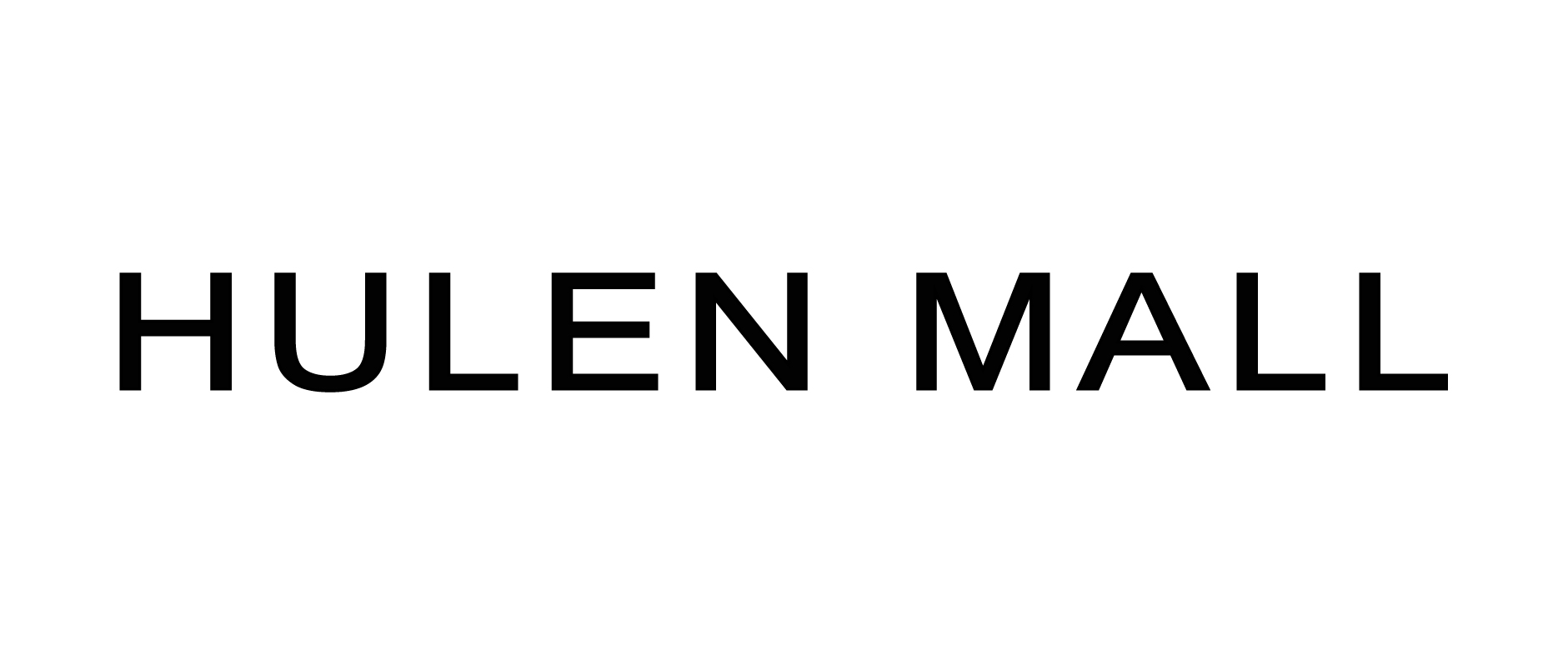

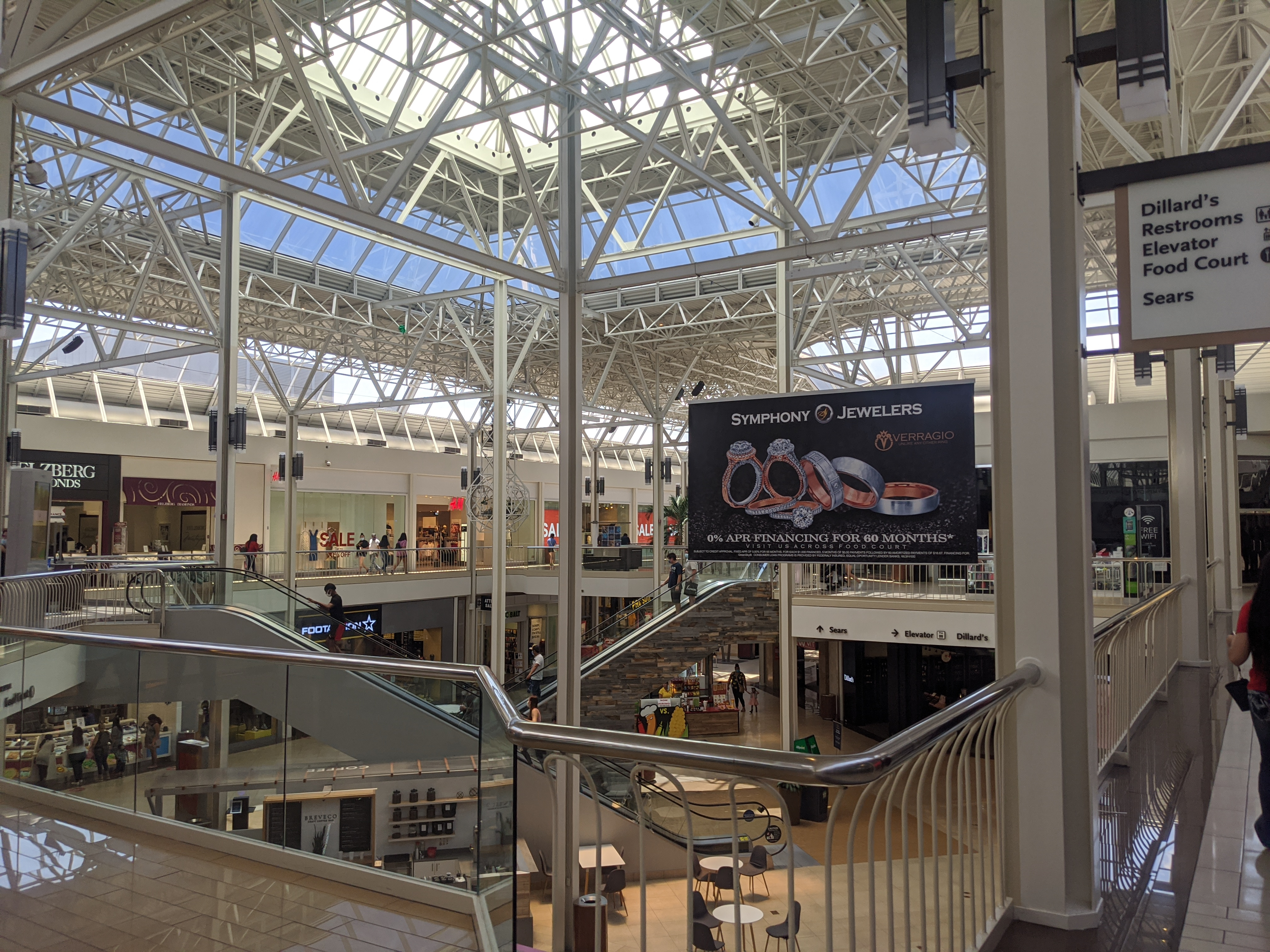
- Central atrium (August 2020)
- Location: Fort Worth, Texas, U.S.
- Coordinates: 32.6784°N 97.3984°W
- Address: 4800 S. Hulen Street
- Opened: August 4, 1977; 49 years ago
- Developer: The Rouse Company; Federated Stores Realty
- Manager: GGP
- Owner: GGP
- Architect: HOK Group
- Num. of stores: 118
- Num. of anchor tenants: 3 (2 open, 1 vacant)
- Floor area: 942,000 sq ft (87,500 m^{2})
- Floors: 2 (3 in Dillard's and Macy's)
- Website: https://www.hulenmall.com/en.html

Hulen Mall is a regional mall located in southwest Fort Worth, Texas, United States. Located at the southwest corner of Interstate 20 and Hulen Street, it is in the southwest side of the DFW Metroplex.

The mall is anchored by two major department stores and contains 118 specialty shops and stores. As of 2018, it is owned and managed by GGP, a subsidiary of BGRE (formerly Brookfield Properties).

== History ==
Hulen Mall was developed by The Rouse Company and Federated Department Stores, owners of the Sanger Harris department store chain. The Sanger Harris anchor store opened first, on May 5, 1977. The rest of the mall and the second anchor, a Montgomery Ward department store, were officially dedicated on the August 4, 1977, designed by HOK and developed by The Rouse Company. The mall encompassed 580,000 leasable square feet, with 87 stores at opening. The mall had an early food court known as The Park.

The mall existed in its original state until July 1993, when a western expansion opened. Included in the new wing was a replacement food court and a Dillard's department store. The expansion was dedicated on August 24, 1994. After the expansion, the mall's total retail floor area grew to 916,700 sq ft.

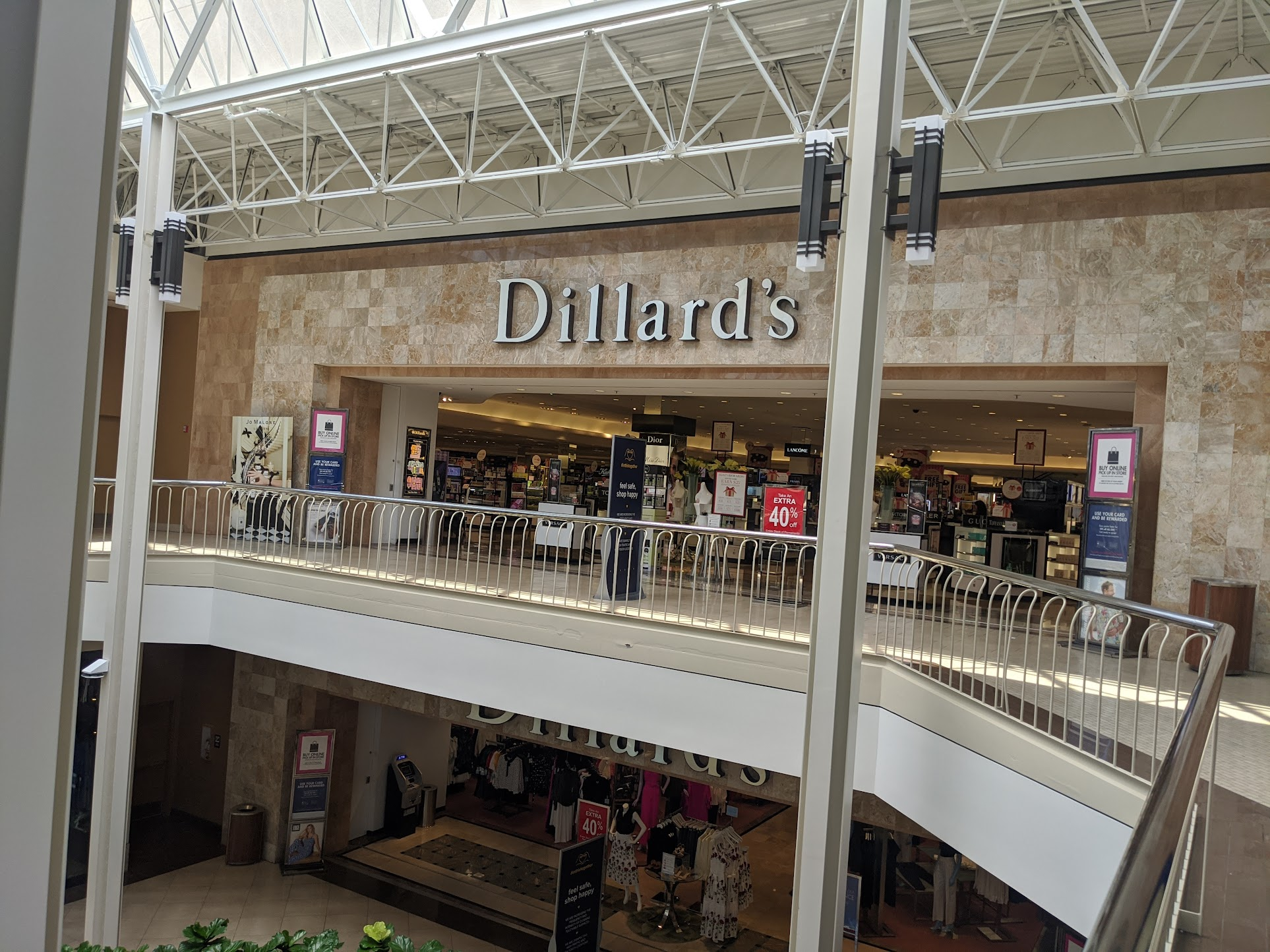
Dillard's court entrance in August 2020

In 2004, The Rouse Company was sold to General Growth Properties.

The mall underwent light cosmetic renovations starting in 2011, with 25,330 square feet of restaurants added to the eastern facade. Upon its completion the property would encompass 942,000 square feet.

=== Anchor history ===
On May 5, 1977, the 200,000 square foot, three-story Sanger Harris anchor store opened. It included a beauty salon, a potting shed restaurant and a design studio.

On August 4, 1977, the 154,000 square foot, two-story Montgomery Ward anchor store was dedicated, along with the mall proper. The Montgomery Ward included a beauty salon, a frontier room restaurant, pharmacy and freestanding auto center.

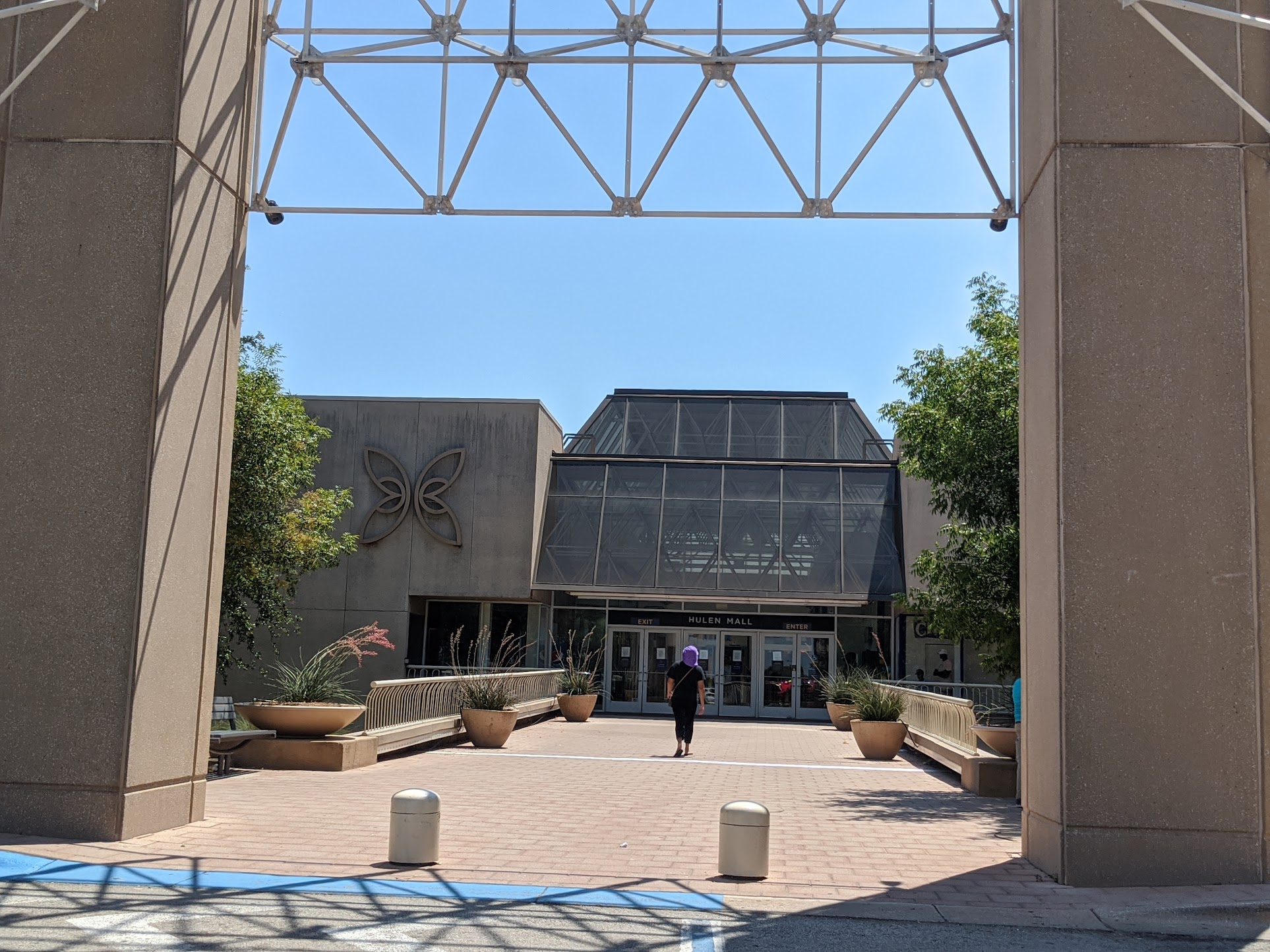
North Mall Entrance, August 2020

In July 1987, the mall's existing Sanger Harris department store was rebranded to Foley's. The chain's parent company, Federated Department Stores merged the two chains to consolidate operations.

On August 24, 1994, a 336,700 square foot, three-story Dillard's joined the mall as its third anchor store, dedicated with the mall's western wing.

In March 2001, the mall's Montgomery Ward department store went into liquidation and closed with the rest of the chain.

On March 21, 2002, Sears opened in the former Montgomery Ward space.

On September 9, 2006, Foley's was re-branded as Macy's, as part of Federated Department Stores' acquisition and re-branding of May Department Stores.

Sears closed in August 2020.

== Gallery ==
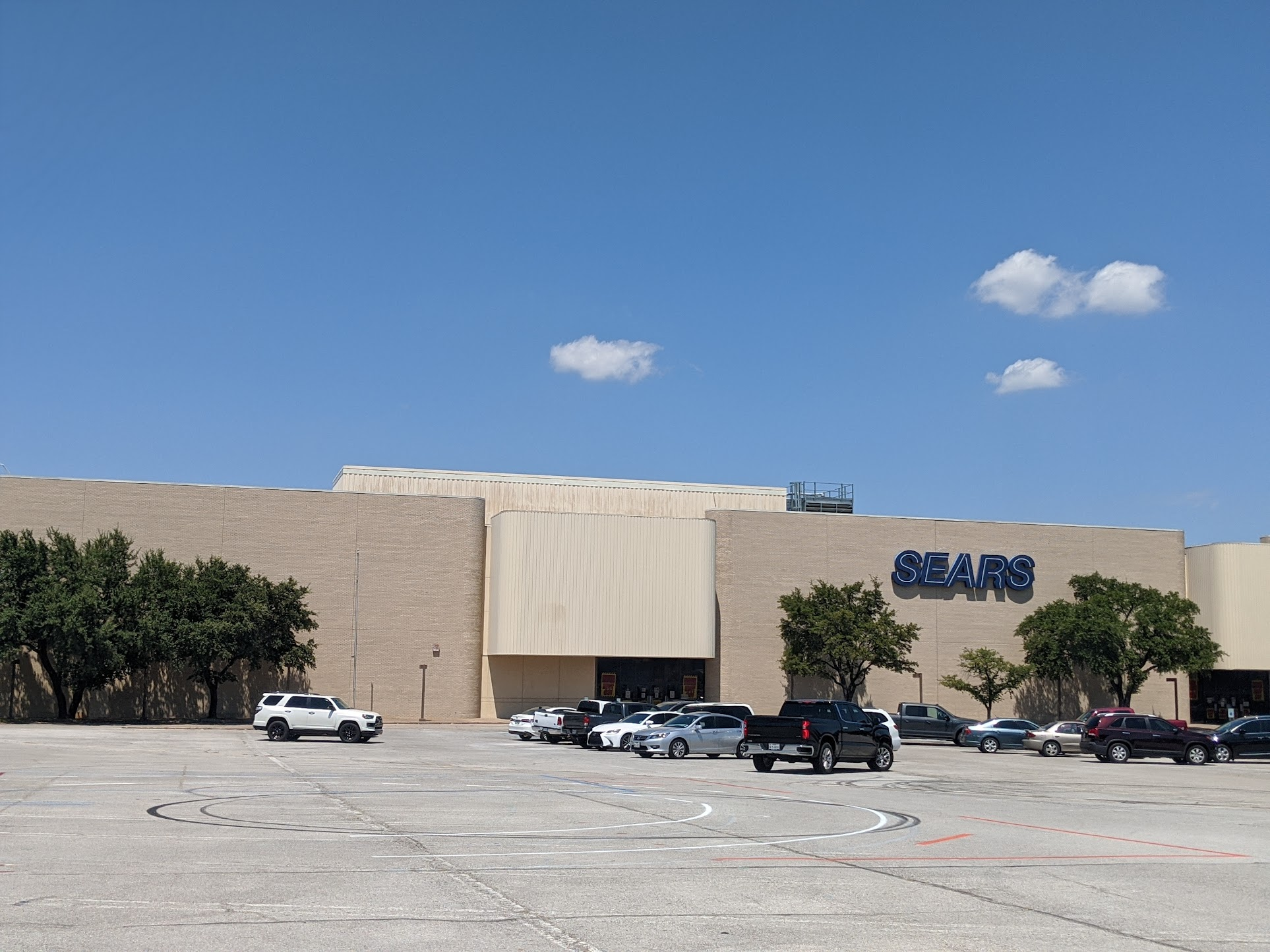
Former Sears, August 2020

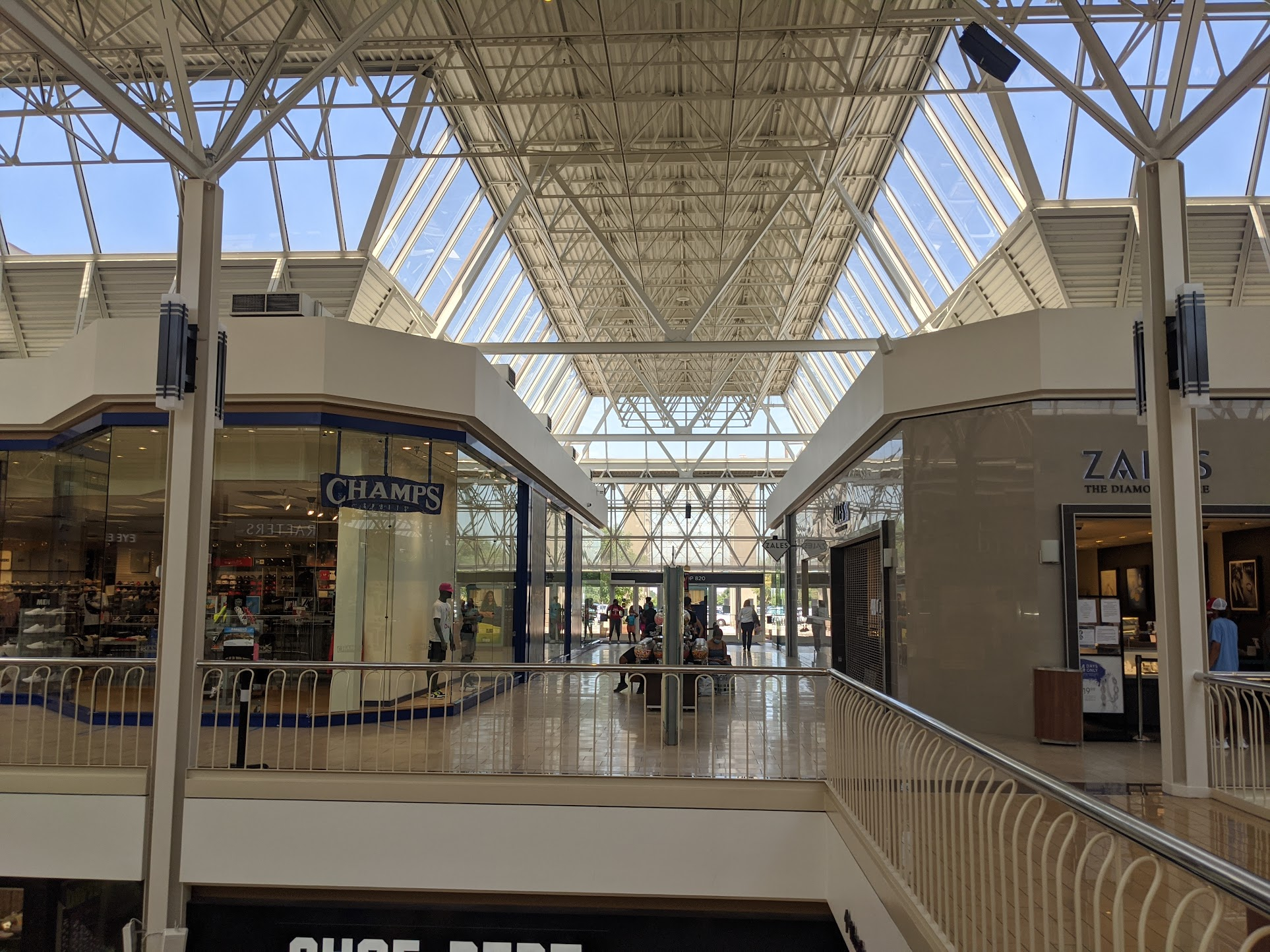
North entrance, August 2020

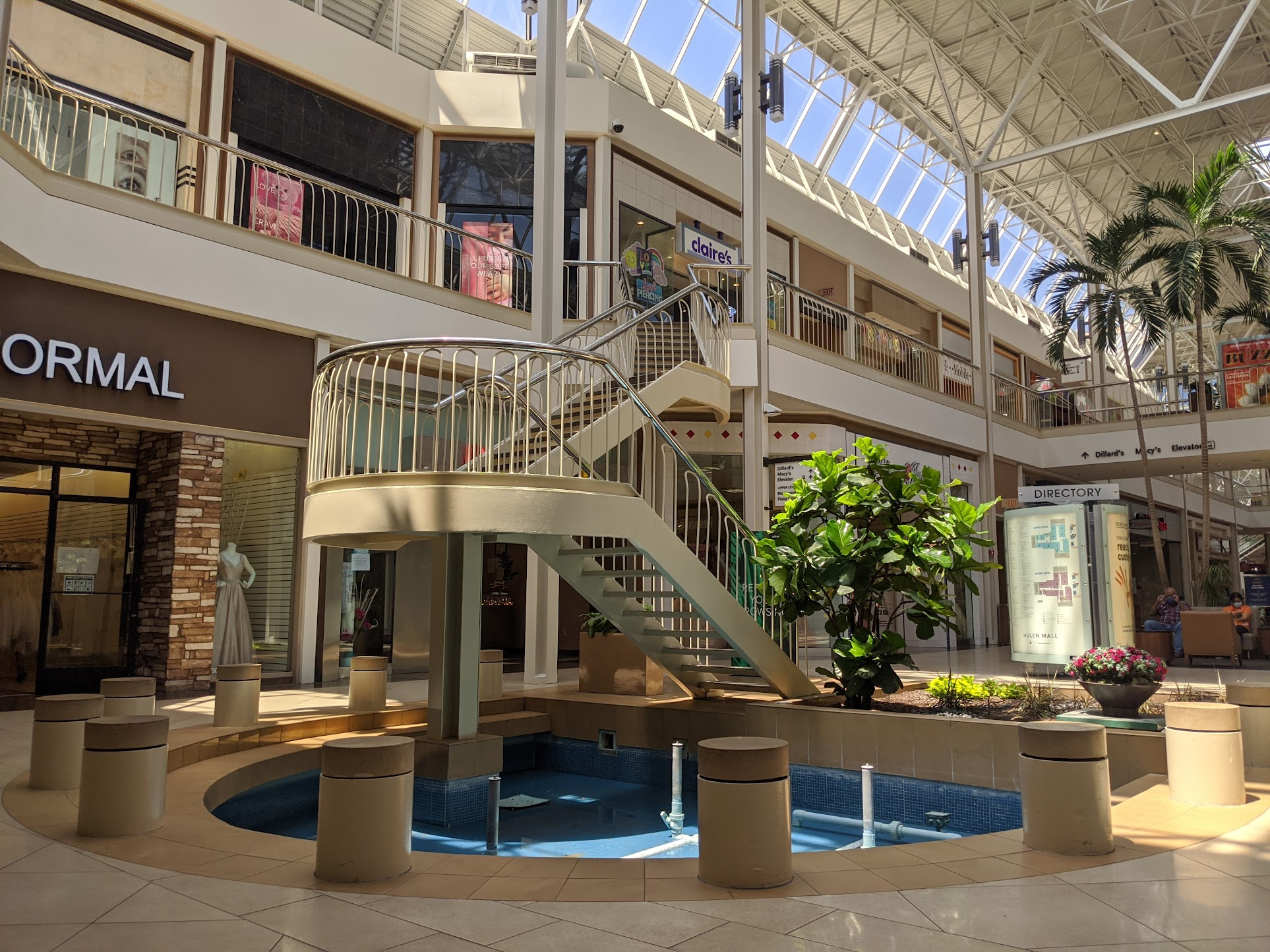
South court, February 2020

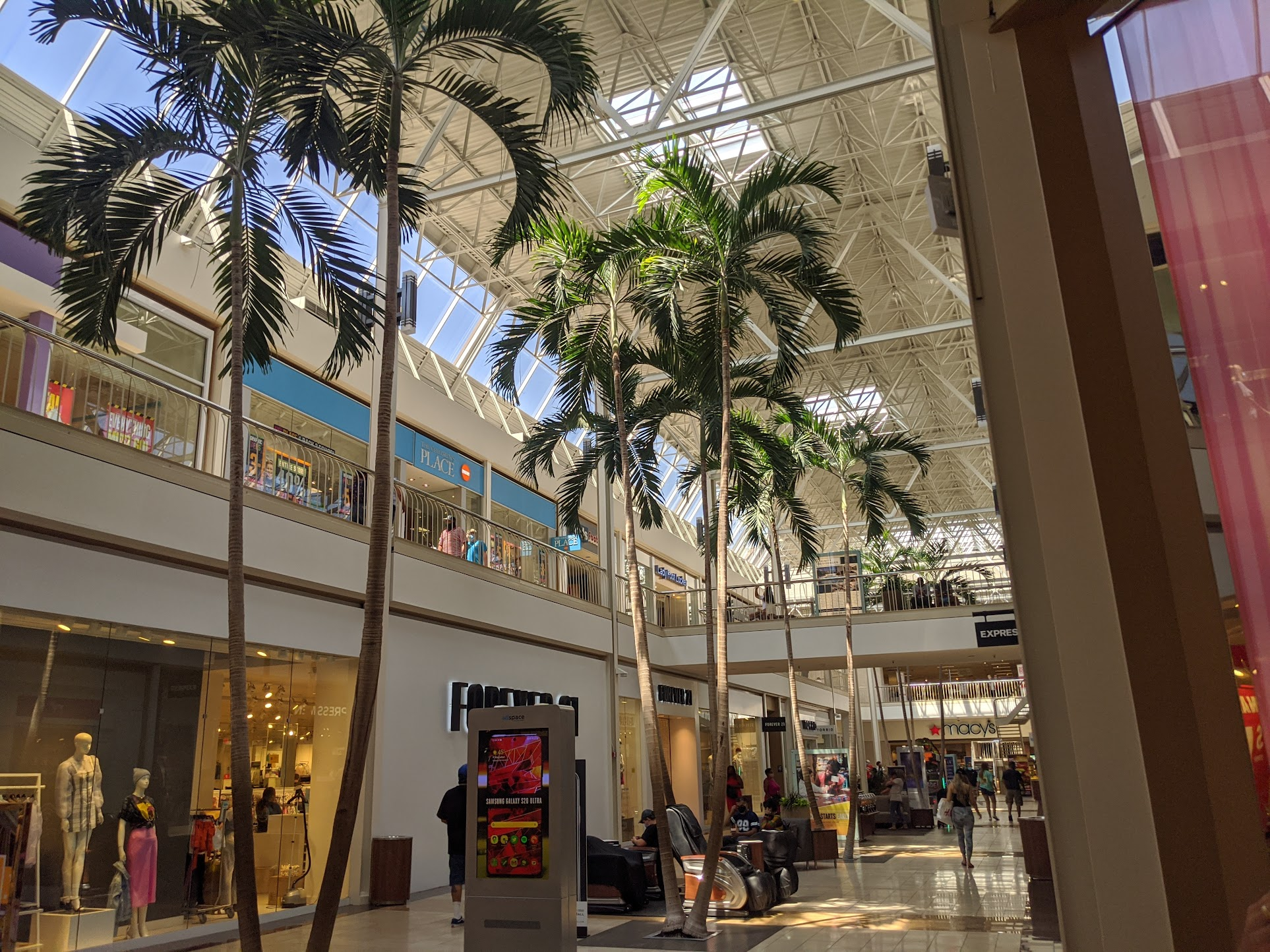
Macy's wing from floor 1, August 2020

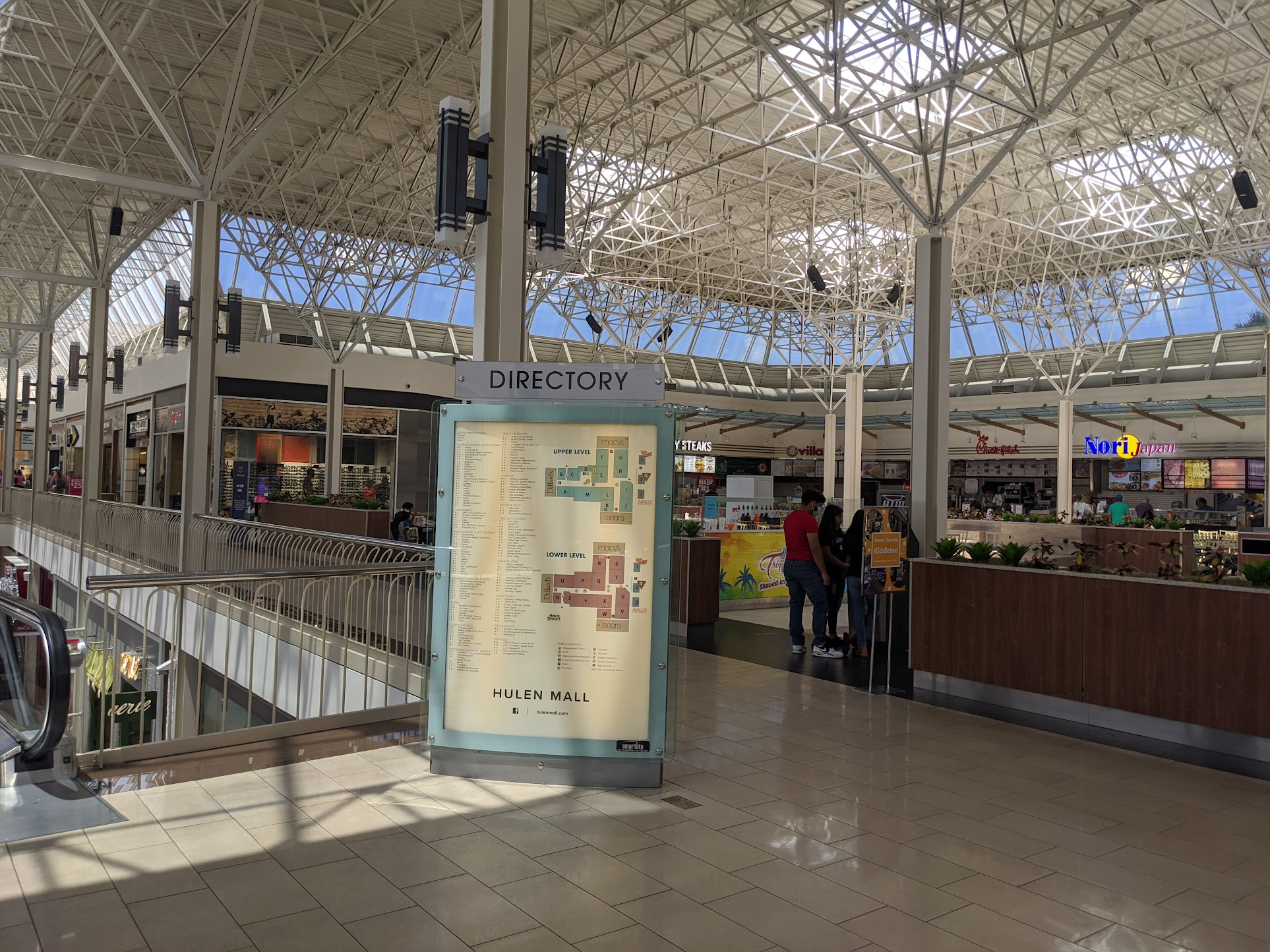
Food court, August 2020

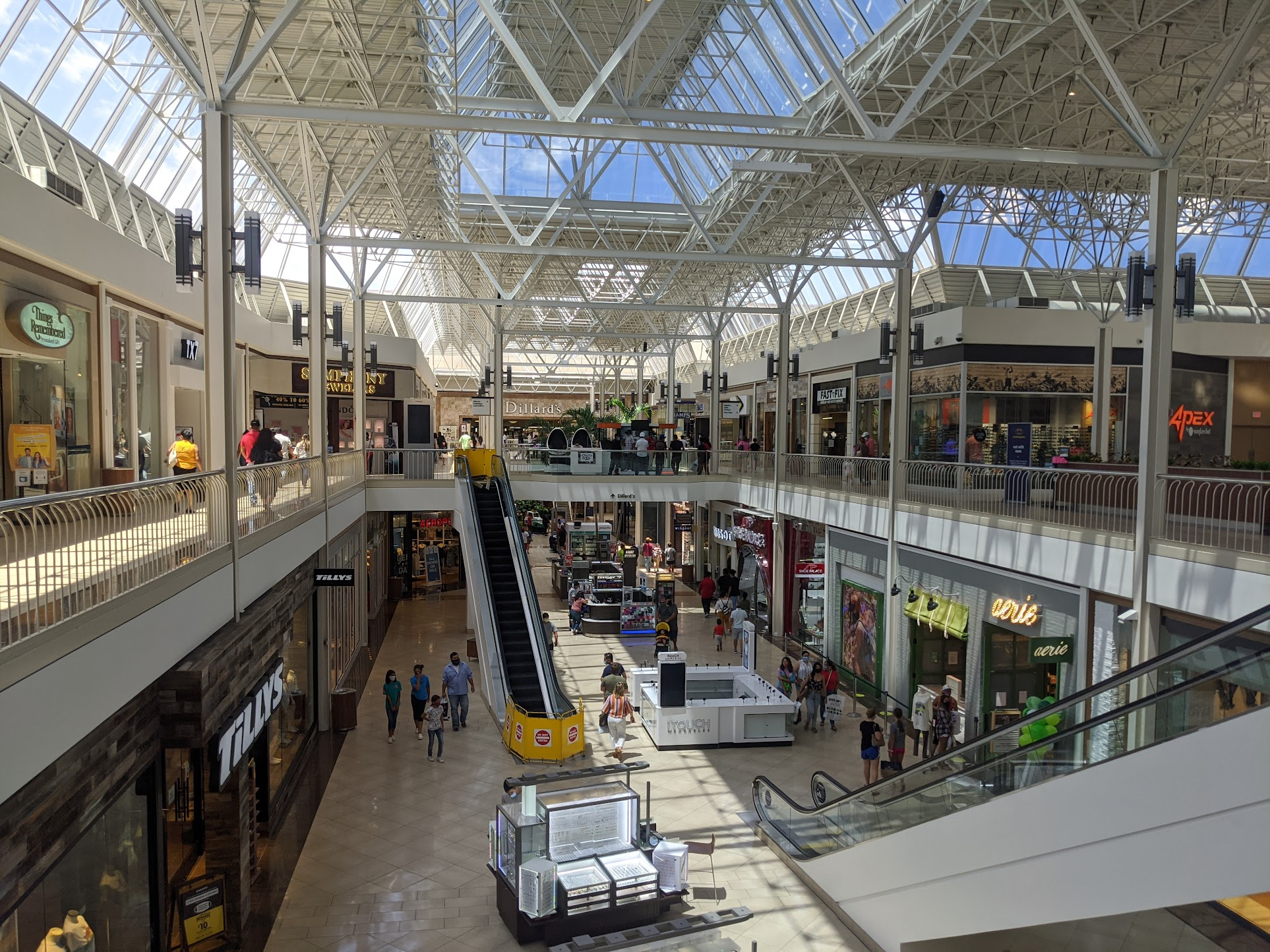
Dillard's wing, August 2020

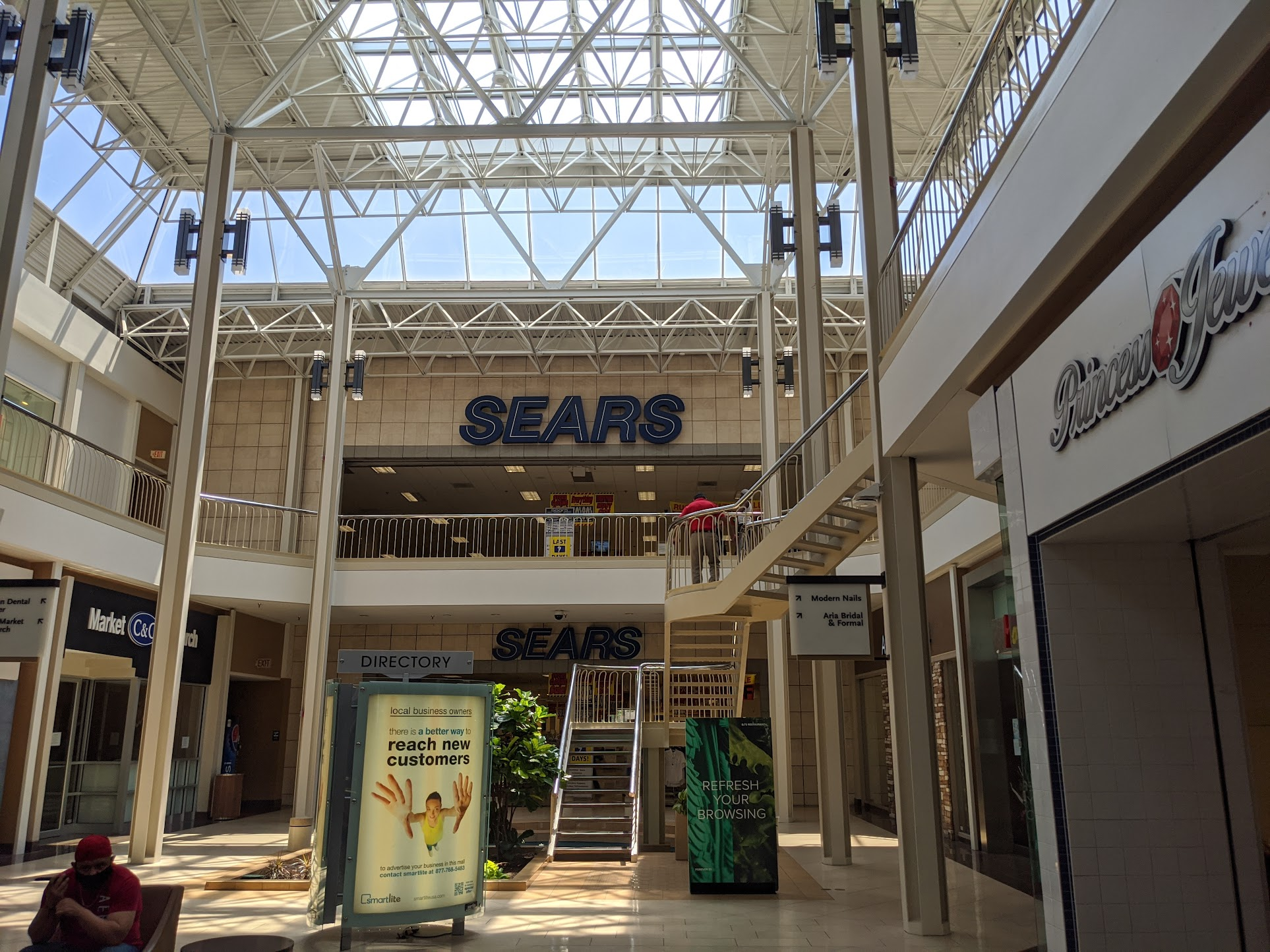
Sears court, August 2020

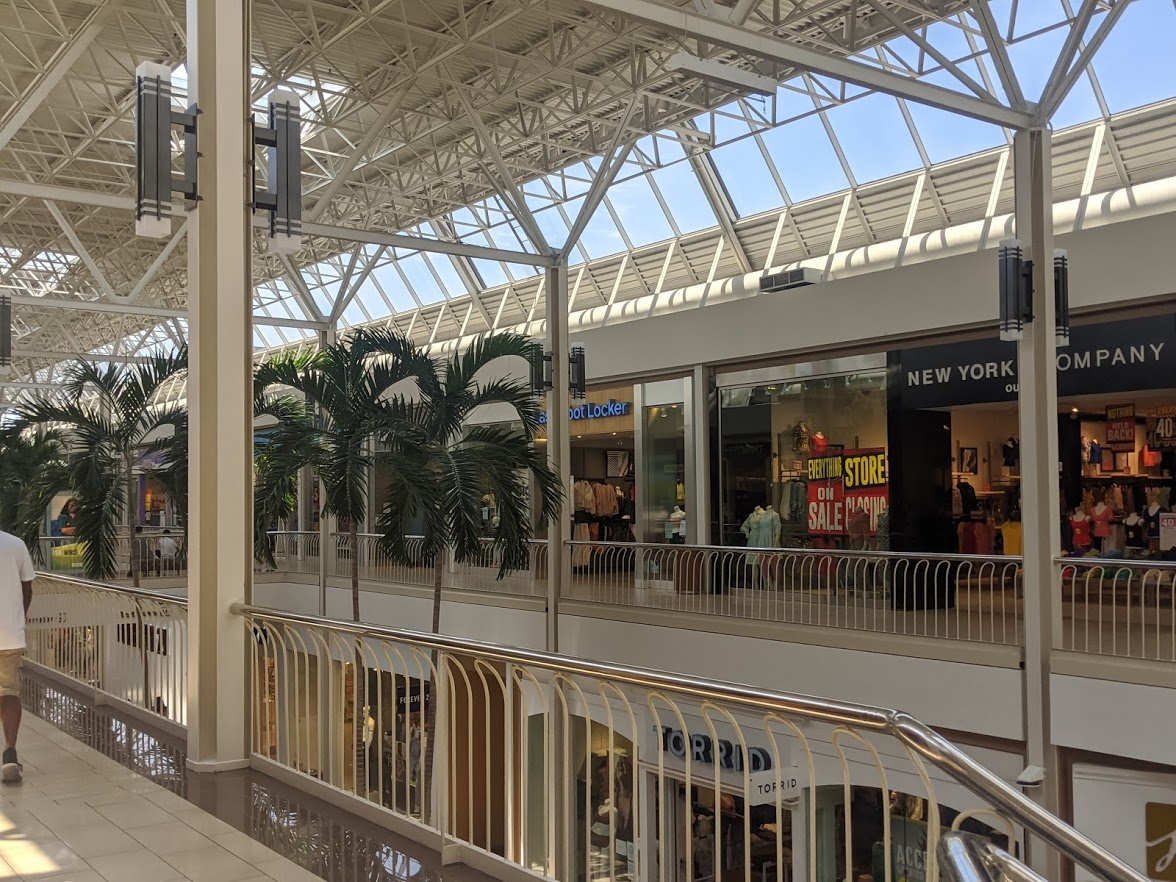
Dillard's wing, April 2021

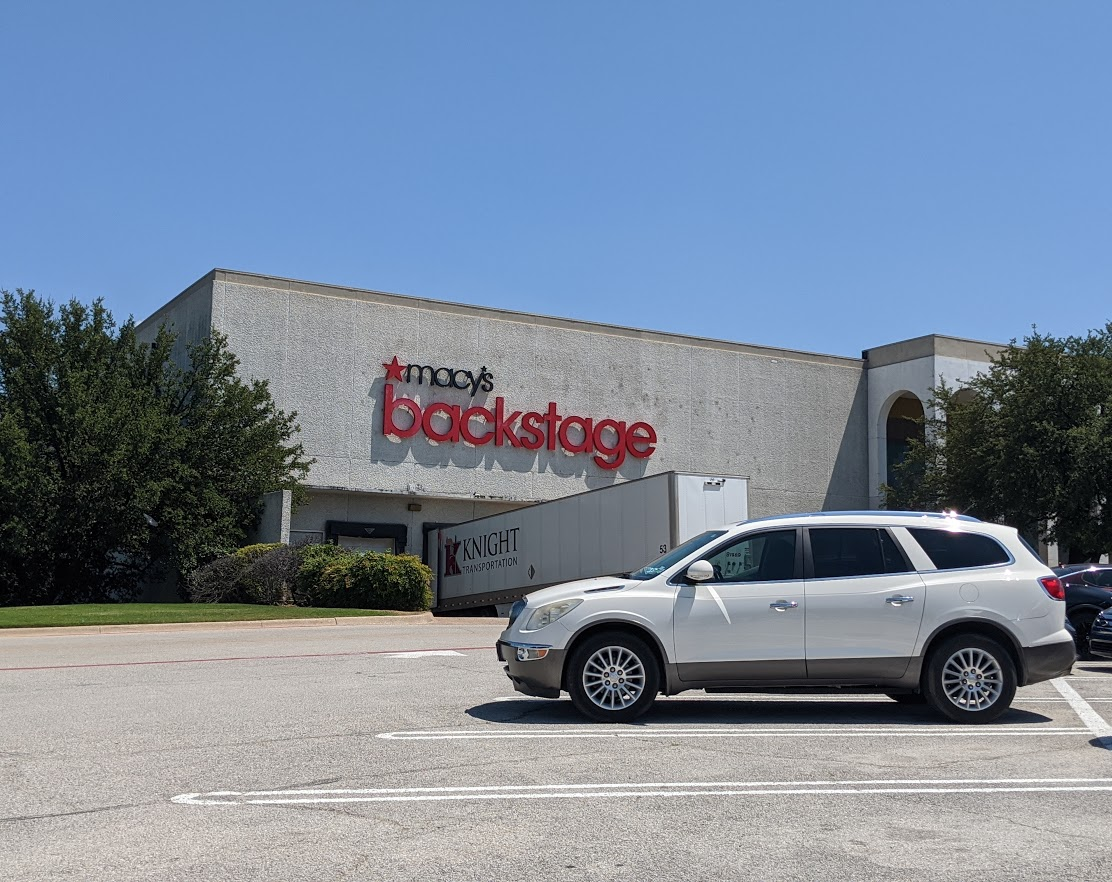
Macy's exterior, April 2021
