= Collin Creek Mall =

Defunct mall in Plano, Texas, U.S.

Coordinates: 33°0′48″N 96°42′46″W

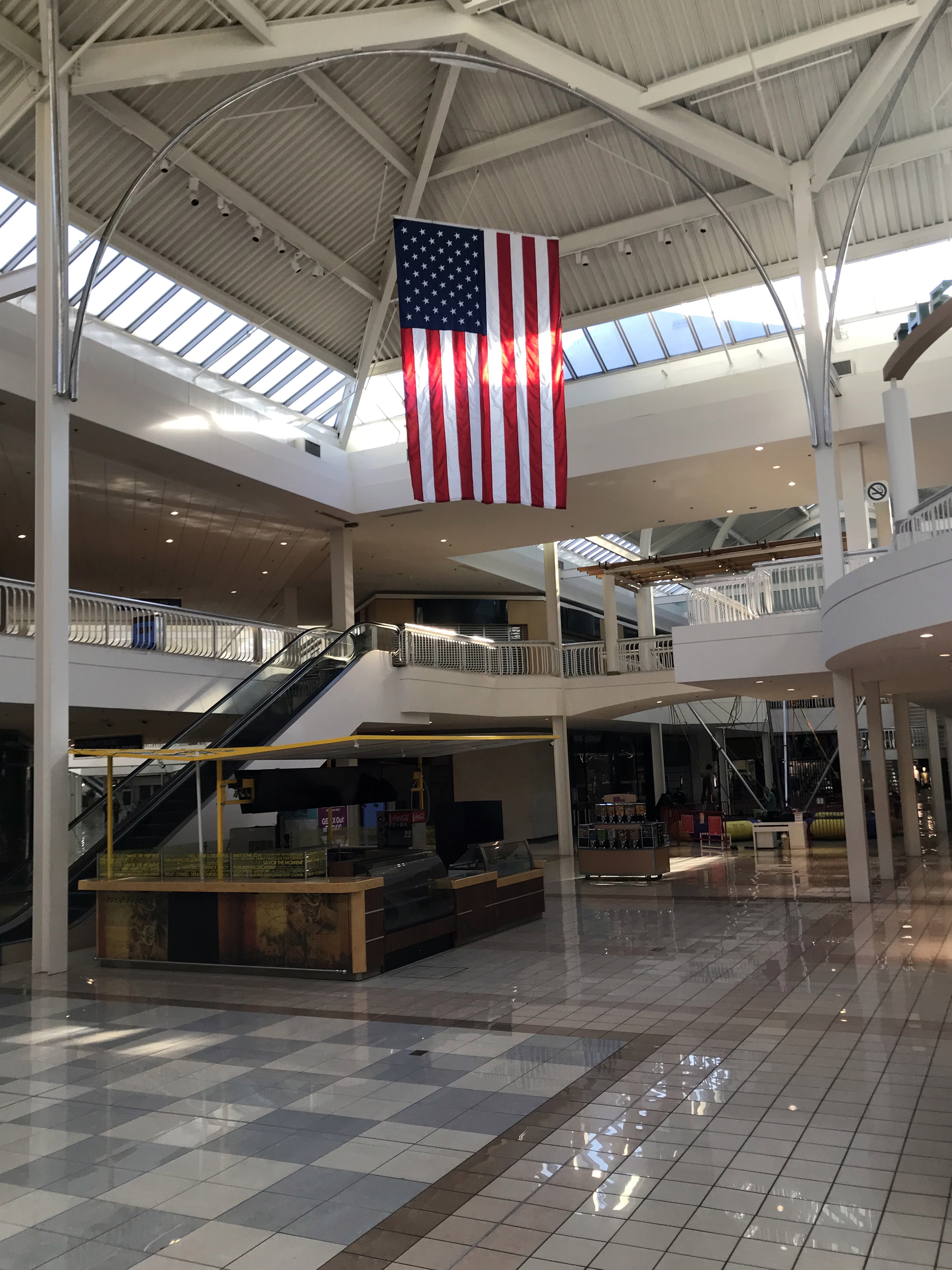
- Central atrium (February 2019)
- Location: Plano, Texas, U.S.
- Address: 811 N. Central Expressway, 75075
- Opened: July 29, 1981; 45 years ago
- Renovated: 1992; 2008
- Closed: July 31, 2019; 7 years ago
- Demolished: August 2019 – September 2021 (partial)
- Developer: Federated Stores Realty
- Manager: Centurion American Development Group
- Owner: Centurion American Development Group
- Architect: RTKL Associates
- Num. of stores: 130 (at peak)
- Num. of anchor tenants: 5 (at peak)
- Floor area: 1,100,000 square feet (100,000 m^{2})
- Floors: 2
- Website: collincreekmall.com (2016 archive)
- Building details

General information
- Status: Partially demolished
- Construction started: November 1979; 47 years ago
- Completed: 1981

Design and construction
- Main contractor: Vracinis Construction

Collin Creek Mall was a regional mall in Plano, Texas. The two-level, 1.1-million-square-foot (100,000 m^{2}) structure was developed in July 1981 and was located on the western side of North Central Expressway (US 75) near President George Bush Turnpike. The mall's name was a combination of Collin County and Spring Creek, the latter of which it was built on top of.

In 2019, following years of decline, competition from newer malls, and several ownership changes, the mall was closed for redevelopment. The structure has since been partially demolished, with the former atrium and wings set to be used as part of a $1 billion mixed-use development.

== History ==
=== 1977–1981: Development and opening ===
Initially a rural area on the fringe of Dallas, Collin County experienced heavy growth starting in the late 1970s. The City of Plano was especially impacted due to its location along the North Central Expressway (US 75) and relative proximity to Dallas, growing from 18,000 people to 72,000 by the end of the decade. In 1977, seeking to take advantage of the influx, department store conglomerate Federated Department Stores (now Macy's, Inc.) announced plans to construct a new mall in Plano through its real-estate arm, Federated Stores Realty. The mall was intended to serve Collin County shoppers along US 75, with advertisements listing its trade area stretching as far north as Van Alstyne.

The company hired the Baltimore, Maryland-based architectural firm RTKL Associates to design the mall. The design utilized a "greenhouse"-style architecture, similar to previous RTKL project Paramus Park. The mall's center court included a 300-foot (91 m) indoor creek with a waterfall, fountains, and shrubbery. Surrounding the creek was The Village Walk, an 18,000-square-foot (1,700 m^{2}) section of smaller, locally owned shops, as well as The Patio, a food court. The project also included three 2,400-foot (730 m) culverts that carried Spring Creek under the structure.

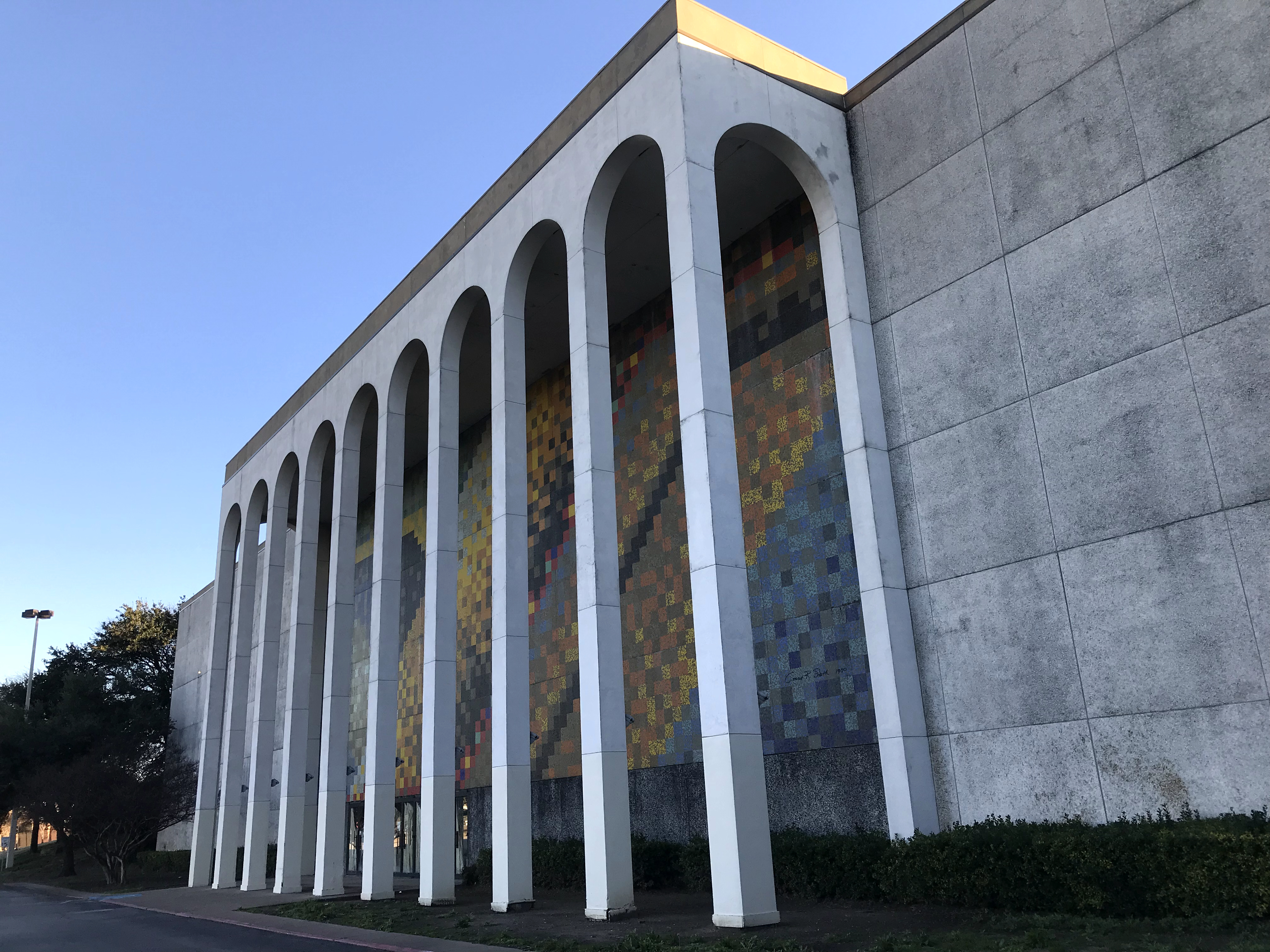
Former Sanger Harris (later Foley's and Macy's) exterior (February 2019)

Construction on the mall began in November 1979. The first store to open at the mall was department store Sanger Harris (a subsidiary of Federated), which opened on October 20, 1980. The main mall, as well as the anchor stores Sears and Dillard's, opened on July 29, 1981.

=== 1981–1990: Early years ===
Two more anchor stores, Lord & Taylor and JCPenney, opened at the mall in October 1981 and July 1983, respectively. In October 1983, Federated sold Collin Creek and three other malls to JMB Realty Corporation for $112 million.

In 1987, Sanger Harris was merged into Foley's. In 1990, Mervyn's purchased the Lord & Taylor store for an undisclosed sum; the store was closed for renovation and re-opened in October.

=== 1992–2008 ===
In 1992, the mall's center court was renovated. The Village Walk was removed, the food court was renamed to The Terrace, and the indoor creek was replaced with a smaller fountain.

In September 1995, The Rouse Company of Columbia, Maryland purchased a 30% stake in the mall and took over management. As part of a joint venture with Simon Property Group and Westfield Group, Rouse assumed full ownership of the mall in 2002 from Urban Retail Properties and Rodamco North America. Two years later, the company as a whole was acquired by the Chicago, Illinois-based General Growth Properties (GGP) for $12.6 billion.

In 2006, Foley's was converted to Macy's as part of a nationwide rebranding initiative by Federated Department Stores. The same year, Mervyn's closed its store at Collin Creek and exited the North Texas area. The anchor building remained vacant until December 2007, when GGP announced the construction for Amazing Jake's Food and Fun, a family entertainment center and buffet restaurant. Amazing Jake's opened in July 2008 alongside a renovation of the mall's interior.

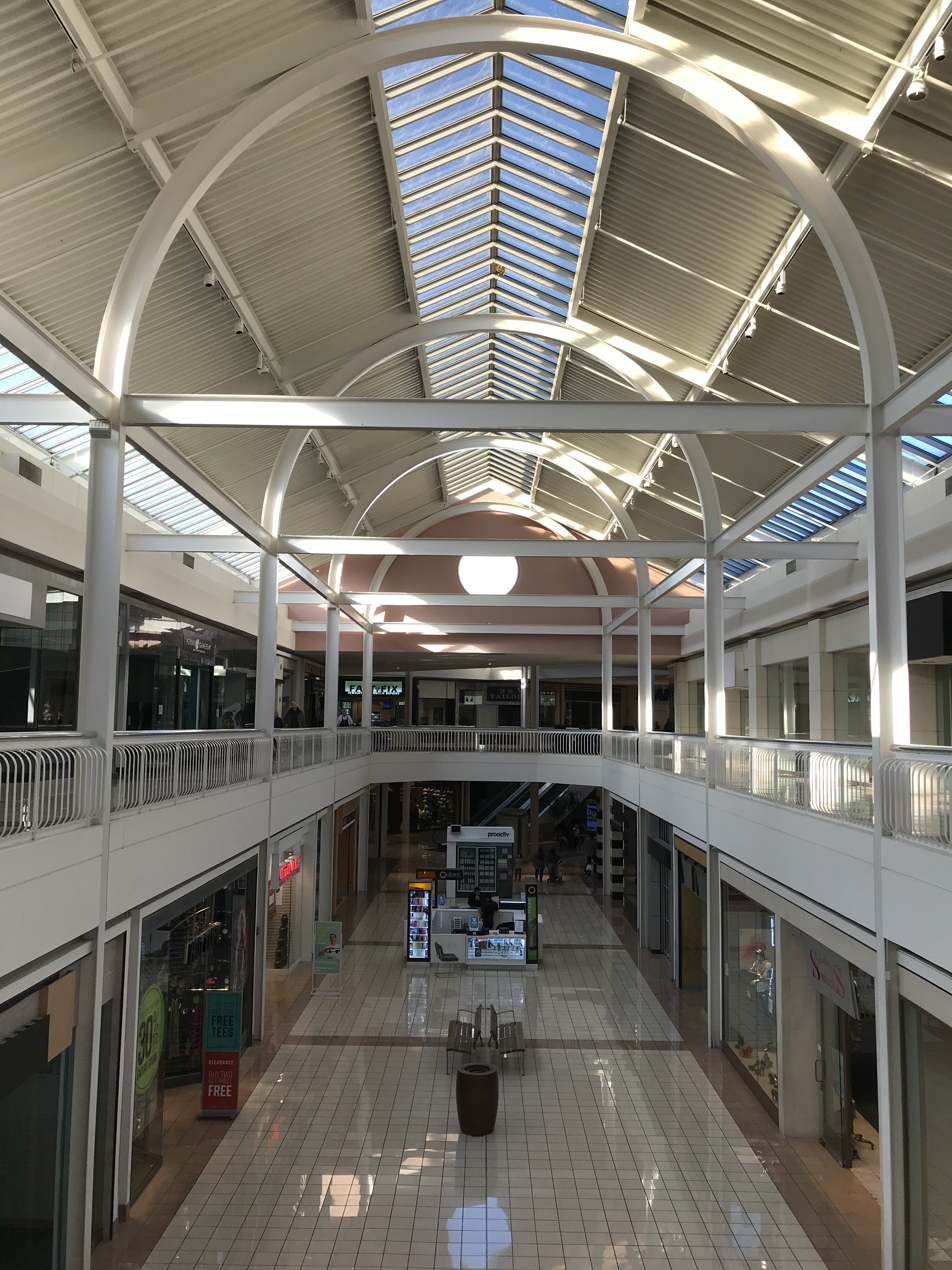
Largely vacant second floor (February 2019)

=== 2011–2017: Decline ===
In 2011, GGP spun off 30 underperforming "Class-B" and "Class-C" properties, including Collin Creek, into a new company called Rouse Properties. The mall's underperformance was attributed to competition with newer shopping centers such as Stonebriar Centre, Firewheel Town Center, and Allen Premium Outlets. In 2012, the city of Plano offered Rouse a $600,000 grant for renovations and tenant recruitment.

In October 2013, Dillard's announced that its Collin Creek location would close by January 2014. In December 2014, Rouse Properties designated Collin Creek as a "special consideration asset", which signaled that the mall might be foreclosed. A report by analysis firm Trepp stated the mall had not made a profit since 2011.

The following year, the mall was sold to Rouse's lender, Midland Loan Services (a division of PNC Financial Services), for $57.6 million. Macy's closed on March 31, 2017.

== Redevelopment ==
=== First proposal ===
In early 2018, developer Sam Ware of Dreien Partners, who had previously developed the Legacy West project in northwest Plano, announced a $1 billion plan to revitalize the site. The city of Plano was involved in the project and intended to promote the site as a potential location for Amazon HQ2. Under the proposal, Dreien would demolish a significant portion of the mall's northern wing, replacing it and much of its parking lot with office space, residences, restaurants, and green space. It would also add a synthetic river (loosely following Spring Creek, which the mall's parking lot was built on top of), which would be lined with retail space, similar to the San Antonio River Walk.

Dreien attempted to borrow $40 million to purchase the mall's land, but it entered a conflict with its lender, Frontier State Bank, over the terms of the loan. Due to the conflict, the company was unable to close the deal before its purchase agreements expired.

=== Second proposal and mall closure ===
Collin Creek Redevelopment
- Alternative names: Collin Creek

General information
- Status: Under construction
- Type: Mixed-use: (Office; Retail; Dining; Hotel; Apartments; Housing)
- Location: Plano, Texas, U.S., 811 N. Central Expressway, 75075
- Construction started: August 2019 with the partial demolition of Collin Creek Mall
- Estimated completion: Early 2030s
- Opened: Mid-2024 (phase I)

Technical details
- Floor count: 8 (for some buildings)

Design and construction
- Developer: Centurion American Development Group

Website
- www.collincreek.com

In August 2018, developer Centurion American, who had previously redeveloped The Statler Hotel & Residences in Downtown Dallas, announced its own proposal for the site. Under the proposal, Centurion American would replace four of the mall's anchor stores and parking lot with a residential district, two office buildings, a hotel, a concert venue, an underground parking garage, and several restaurants. Unlike Dreien's proposal, Centurion American would preserve both wings of the mall, as well as the JCPenney store, which was on a separate, unsold parcel.

In late 2018, the mall was successfully acquired by Centurion American. Sears and Amazing Jake's closed in March and April 2019, respectively, with their underlying land parcels sold to Centurion American.

On July 26, 2019, the mall hosted a 1980s-themed farewell party titled Goodbye Collin Creek Mall, Hello Collin Creek, featuring a 1980s tribute band The M80s, a costume contest, and a vintage DMC DeLorean on display. The mall closed permanently on July 31, and demolition began the following month.

=== Construction ===
In August 2020, JCPenney announced that its Collin Creek store, which had been kept open as the rest of the site was redeveloped, would close in November. The 10.6-acre (4.3 ha) site was sold to Centurion American for $15 million.

Following delays related to the COVID-19 pandemic, a groundbreaking for the new development was held on September 24, 2021. The development included a municipal project to install a sanitary sewer and to reinforce the culverts carrying Spring Creek.

As of July 2024, the project's infrastructure is complete, two apartment buildings have started construction, and single-family residences are expected to be available by the end of the year. Certain elements of the mall were intentionally preserved to merge historical structures with modern development. The retail and restaurant portion of the redevelopment is expected to open in phases starting in late 2026 and continuing through 2028.
