= Sanger Harris Building =

Coordinates: 32.7823°N 96.8004°W

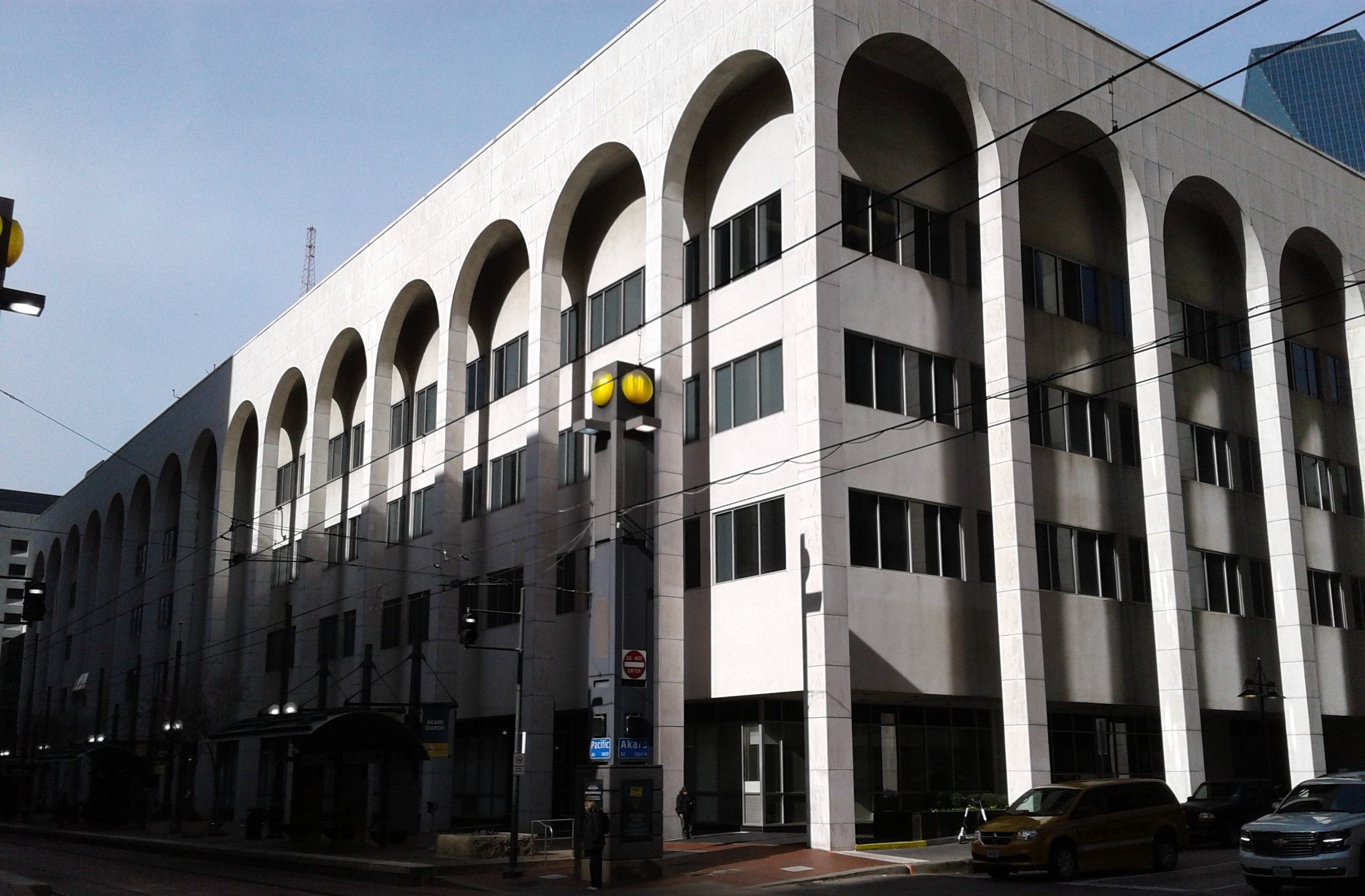

General information
- Completed: 1965

The Sanger Harris Building is a building in downtown Dallas that was opened in 1965 as the flagship location of Sanger Harris department store. In 1987, Sanger Harris merged with Foley's and the building continued to operate as the Foley's Dallas flagship store. It was closed in 1990 while Foley's was opening newer locations in the area. It is currently the headquarters for Dallas Area Rapid Transit.

== Architecture ==
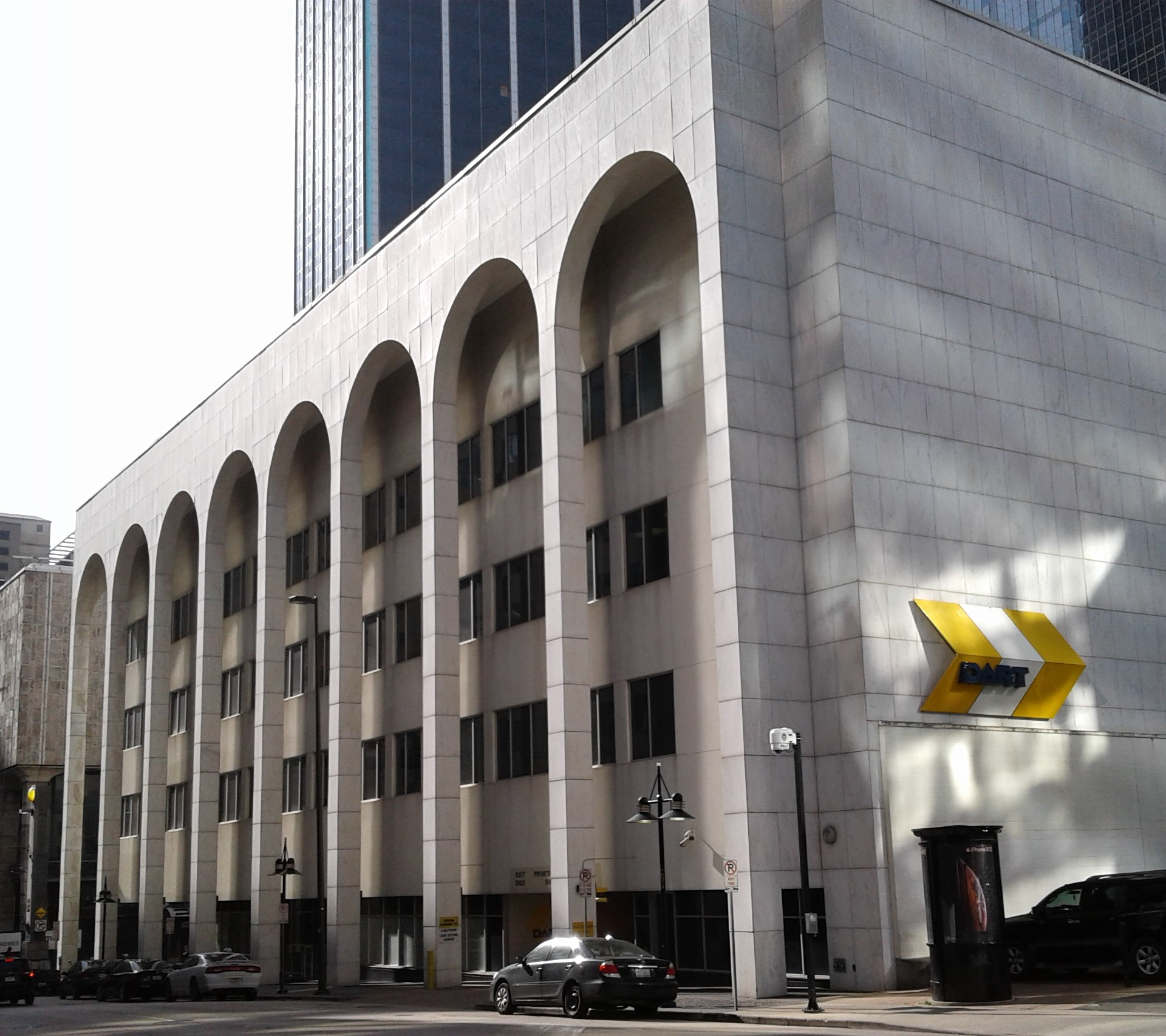

The building was originally designed with white columns and a mosaic. The outside has the Sanger Harris name engraved in various entrances. The white columns are still a feature of the building's architecture. The mosaic however is no longer visible. Many of the Sanger Harris branch stores around DFW replicated this same design.

== Sanger Harris ==
Sanger-Harris department store was founded in 1961 as a merger of two Dallas department stores, Sanger Brothers and A. Harris & Co.

In January 1987, the Sanger Harris stores were combined with Federated’s Houston-based department store Foley's and all of the Dallas locations were renamed Foley's. The next year, the chain was sold to The May Department Stores Company.

In 2006, Foley's along with its owner at the time (May Company) was bought by Macy's and the Dallas locations were renamed Macy's.
