= La Palmera =

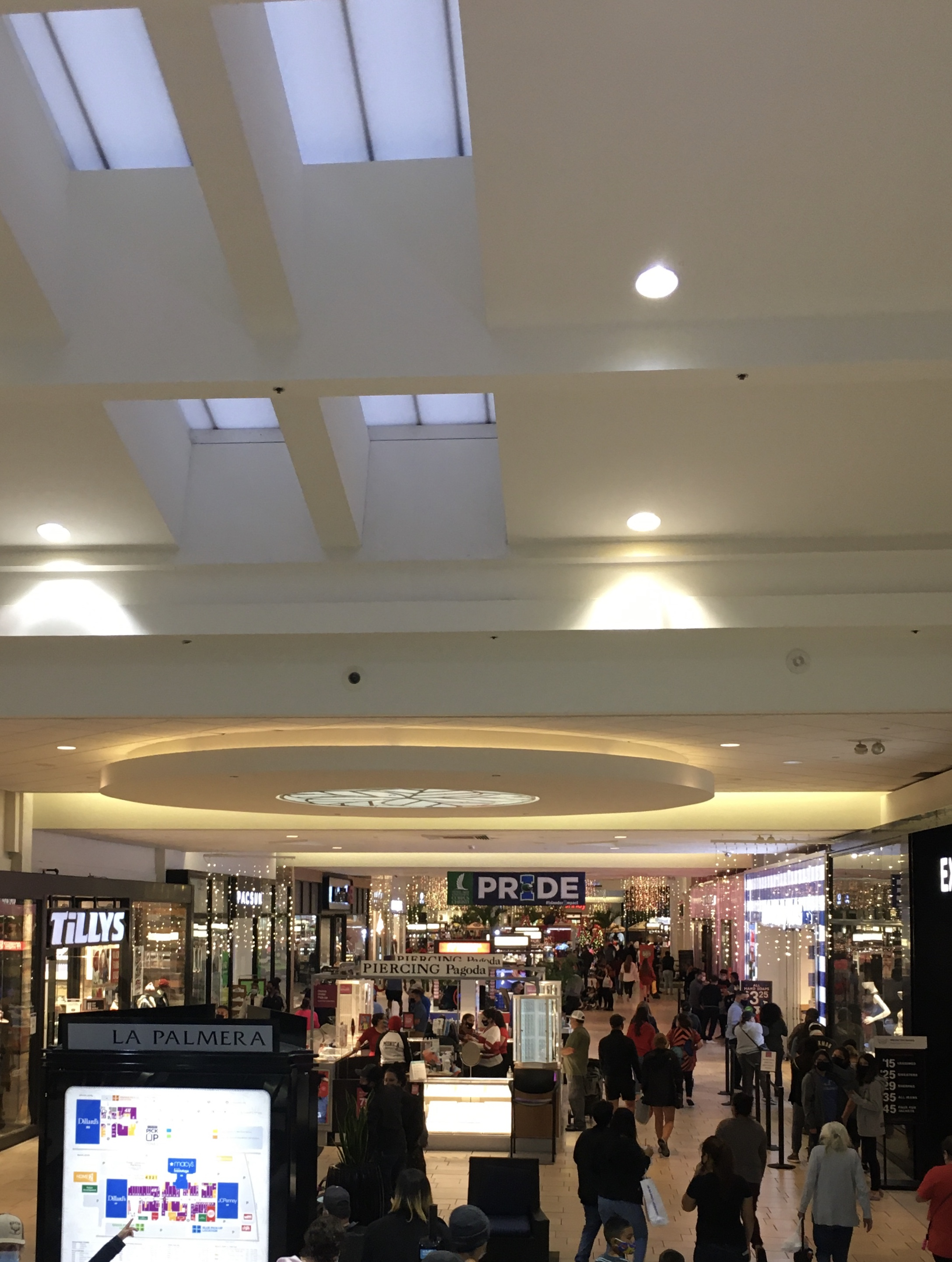
- La Palmera during the holiday shopping season of 2020
- Location: Corpus Christi, Texas, United States
- Coordinates: 27.71115°N 97.37276°W
- Address: 5488 South Padre Island Drive
- Opened: July 30, 1970
- Developer: Ennis Joslin, Roy Smith
- Manager: Trademark Property Company
- Owner: Trademark Property Company
- Num. of stores: 100+
- Num. of anchor tenants: 2
- Floor area: 986,000 sq ft (91,600 m^{2})
- Floors: 1 with partial upper level (2 in Dillard's and JCPenney, 3 in Macy's)
- Website: lapalmera.com

La Palmera, originally Padre Staples Mall, is an indoor and open-air super-regional shopping mall located along the shopping corridor of South Padre Island Drive at Staples St. in Corpus Christi, Texas, United States. It has over 100 mainline stores and two anchor stores Dillard's and JCPenney, with one vacant space previously occupied by Macy's (originally Foley's).

== History ==
In October 1968, the city issued its largest building permit for Ennis S. Joslin and Roy Smith to construct a mall on 44 acres of farmland. The mall was originally supposed to be called the Lexington Plaza Mall when it was first designed in 1965 because it was located on Lexington Boulevard, however, the owners changed the name in 1966 when Lexington Blvd was renamed South Padre Island Drive. The mall's construction was completed in 1969. The mall was started by Roy M. Smith and Ennis Joslin. The W.M. Bevly family became part owners two years later. The mall would include a movie theater, food court, carousel, and 3 anchors. Another early tenant was Woolworth.

La Palmera opened on July 30, 1970, as Padre Staples Mall and the largest retail shopping mall in the Corpus Christi, Texas area. Original stores included Bealls, Bill's Shoes, Journeys, Luby's Cafeteria, Orange Julius, Texas State Optical, and Waldenbooks. One of the original restaurants was a Chick fil A, the first to open in the state of Texas.

In 1985, the mall had an expansion with Dillard's moving to another anchor space with Palais Royal moving in the former space. Foley's opened in a brand new 3-story anchor space. A parking garage with multiple floors was opened just next to Foley's. In 1988, a double-decker carousel was added to the mall.

In March 2007, small renovations began in the mall as just a few months later, Trademark Properties was beginning to purchase the mall. In July 2008, Padre Staples Mall was fully acquired by Trademark Property Company and was renamed La Palmera. The new owners completely renovated the mall. In early-February 2009, the carousel was removed from the mall. By July 2010, $50 million renovations were finished with a large food court, an outdoor plaza entrance, a 4,500 gallon fish tank, and a maritime-themed children's play area.

On January 8, 2026, Macy's announced that it would be closing as part of a plan to close 14 stores by the end of Q1 2026. The store closed on April 23, 2026.

== Lodging and entertainment ==
One hotel is located just next door to La Palmera. In 2019, a permit was issued to allow construction to start on a 180–room and 4–story Home2 Suites hotel. The hotel finally opened in July 2020.

La Palmera offers many community clubs including Wave Walkers and Tide Turners. Wave Walkers allows attendants to get exercise by walking around the mall. Meanwhile, Tide Turners is a club designed for children to enjoy several activities.
