= Raymond Nasher =

American art collector

Raymond Nasher (October 26, 1921 – March 16, 2007) was a Boston Latin School (1939) and Duke University alumnus (1943) who was an avid art collector. Together with his wife Patsy, he amassed a substantial number of the world's most renowned sculptures (including works by Auguste Rodin, Pablo Picasso, Alexander Calder, Harry Bertoia, Henri Matisse and Henry Moore) and various other significant pieces. Nasher gave the lead gift for creating the Nasher Sculpture Center in Dallas, Texas and Duke University's art museum, the Nasher Museum of Art at Duke University in Durham, North Carolina.

In the early 1960s, Nasher developed NorthPark Center, the mall currently the second largest in Texas. At the time of its construction, it was the world's largest climate-controlled, indoor building.
