= Dallas College El Centro =

Community college in Dallas, Texas, U.S.

Dallas College El Centro Campus
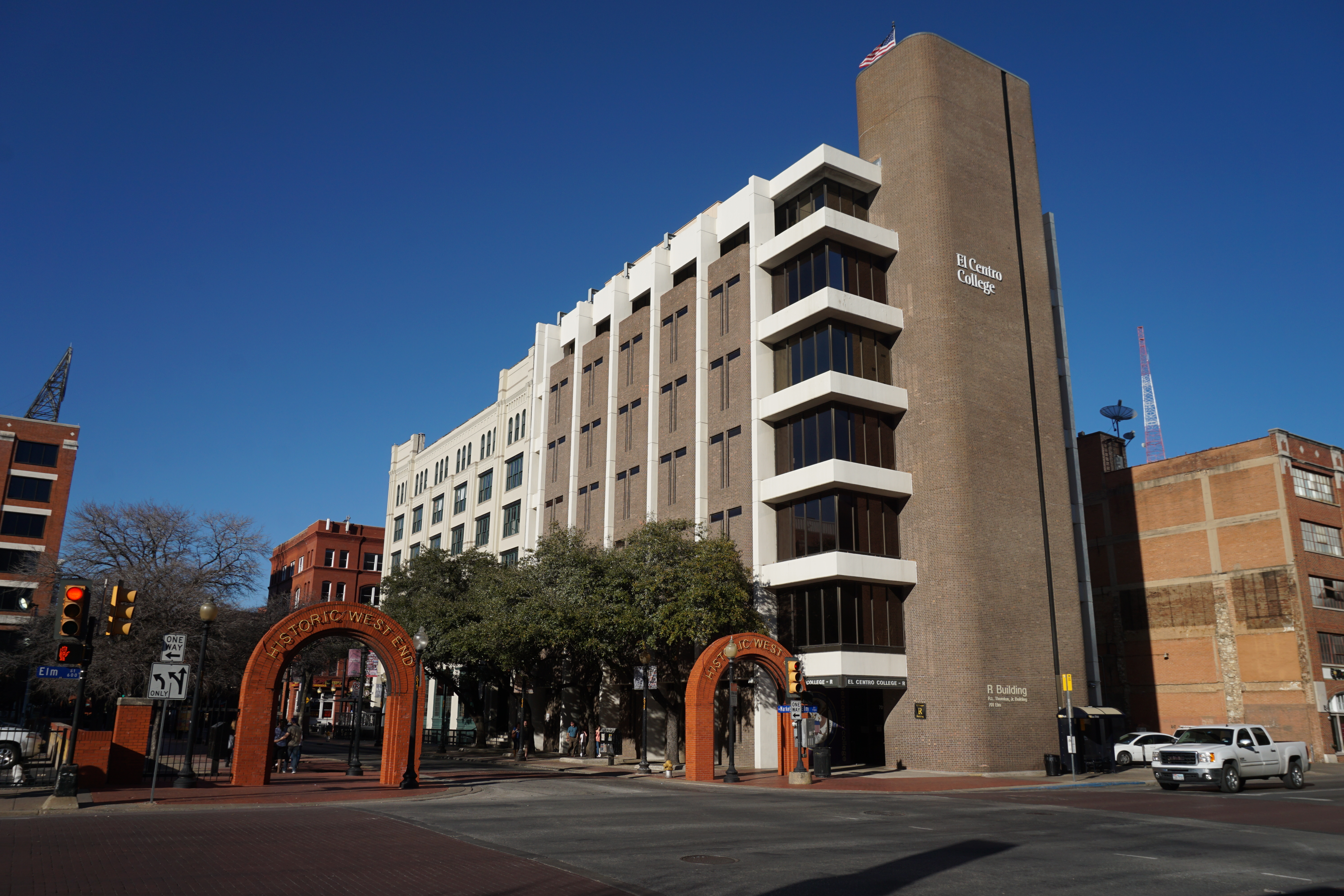
- Dallas College El Centro Campus in the West End
- Type: Public community college
- Established: 1966
- Parent institution: Dallas College
- Chancellor: Justin H. Lonon
- President: Bradford Williams
- Location: Dallas, Texas, United States; 32°46′48″N 96°48′18″W
- Campus: Urban
- Colours: Blue and black
- Mascot: Eagles
- Website: dallascollege.edu
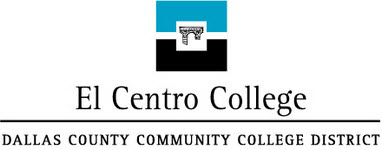

Dallas College El Centro Campus (El Centro or ECC) is a public community college in Dallas, Texas. It is part of Dallas College.

The campus is located at 801 Main Street in downtown Dallas, in the former Sanger Harris department store building listed on the National Register of Historic Places. Dallas College El Centro Campus became the flagship campus of Dallas College in 1966, when it first opened. Its Spanish name reflects the center of the downtown area and it is a Hispanic-Serving Institution (HSI) and a member of the Hispanic Association of Colleges and Universities (HACU).

El Centro's location allows students from all parts of Dallas County to take advantage of core educational courses transferable to four-year institutions, as well as career training in more than 50 fields and a variety of continuing education and workforce education courses. Many of the degree plans offered at El Centro specialize in the medical and technological fields including nursing, culinary/pastry/hospitality, and fashion design and marketing.

== Campuses ==
El Centro has grown from just one campus in downtown Dallas to three campuses in the central section of the city: El Centro main downtown campus, Bill J. Priest campus and West Dallas campus. Two additional buildings are now part of the downtown campus – the R building, which once was home to DCCCD district offices, and the Paramount building, where El Centro's Center for Allied Health and Nursing is located. The Paramount building is located in the West End.

The Downtown campus also houses the Dr. Wright L. Lassiter Jr. Early College High School.

In 2016, El Centro leased over 50,000 square feet on the 10th and 11th floors of nearby One Main Place (Dallas) for the college's growing architecture, digital art, engineering, fashion design, fashion marketing, and interior design programs.

The West Dallas Campus is a one-stop location close to home to register for classes. Students can meet with an adviser, register for classes, and speak to a financial-aid adviser all at the West Campus. El Centro's West Campus is the only college presence in West Dallas.

The Bill J. Priest campus offers a variety of programs, such as welding courses, workplace skills, job search assistance, career exploration, and industrial maintenance.

== 2016 shooting ==
On July 7–8, 2016, the college was affected by a mass shooting targeting police officers. The gunman, Micah Xavier Johnson, who by that point had killed four officers, fled inside the college. Two police officers working with the school were wounded while Johnson attempted to make entry inside a school building. After gaining entry through another route, Johnson stationed himself in an elevated position and was able to kill a fifth officer standing outside the college. After evacuating the building, police officers engaged Johnson in an hours-long standoff. Johnson was eventually killed by a robot-delivered bomb, which also damaged the school's servers. The college cancelled all classes on July 8 and became a crime scene for investigators until July 20 and 21, when it partially reopened to faculty and students.
