= Town East Mall =

Mesquite shopping mall

Coordinates: 32°48′28″N 96°37′25″W

- Location: 2063 Town East Boulevard; Mesquite, Texas
- Opened: October 6, 1971; 55 years ago
- Developer: Homart Development Company
- Manager: GGP
- Owner: GGP
- Architect: Harrel & Hamilton
- Num. of stores: 164
- Num. of anchor tenants: 5 (1 under construction)
- Floor area: 1,223,724 square feet (113,687.7 m^{2})
- Floors: 3
- Website: www.towneastmall.com

Town East Mall is an enclosed shopping mall in the Dallas suburb of Mesquite, Texas. Located on Interstate 635 between Interstate 30 and U.S. Route 80, the mall serves the eastern parts of the Dallas–Fort Worth metroplex.

The three-level, 1.2-million-square-foot (110,000 m^{2}) mall is currently anchored by Macy's, Dillard's, JCPenney, and Dick's Sporting Goods. A fifth anchor, Main Event, is planned.

== History ==
Town East Mall was developed by the Homart Development Company, a subsidiary of Sears. Harrel & Hamilton of Dallas were the architects, and the construction contract was held by the Avery Mayes Construction Company - also based in Dallas. the Y shaped mall features a 168 foot steel pylon at its center. The mall opened on October 6, 1971.

In 1978, the mall was used by director Ron Howard to film portions of the movie Cotton Candy.

In late 2004, the property underwent a $20 million renovation.

Dick's Sporting Goods opened as the 5th anchor store in the mall in March 2018.

In 2021, the mall's Sears store, the last in the Dallas–Fort Worth metroplex, was closed. The store's anchor pad and parking lot, which are owned separately from the mall, are set to be redeveloped. Current plans for the space include a Main Event entertainment center, restaurants, a hotel, and a conference center. It is currently under construction and expected to open in 2026.

== See also ==
- List of shopping malls in the Dallas/Fort Worth Metroplex
