= NorthPark Center =

Shopping mall in Dallas, Texas

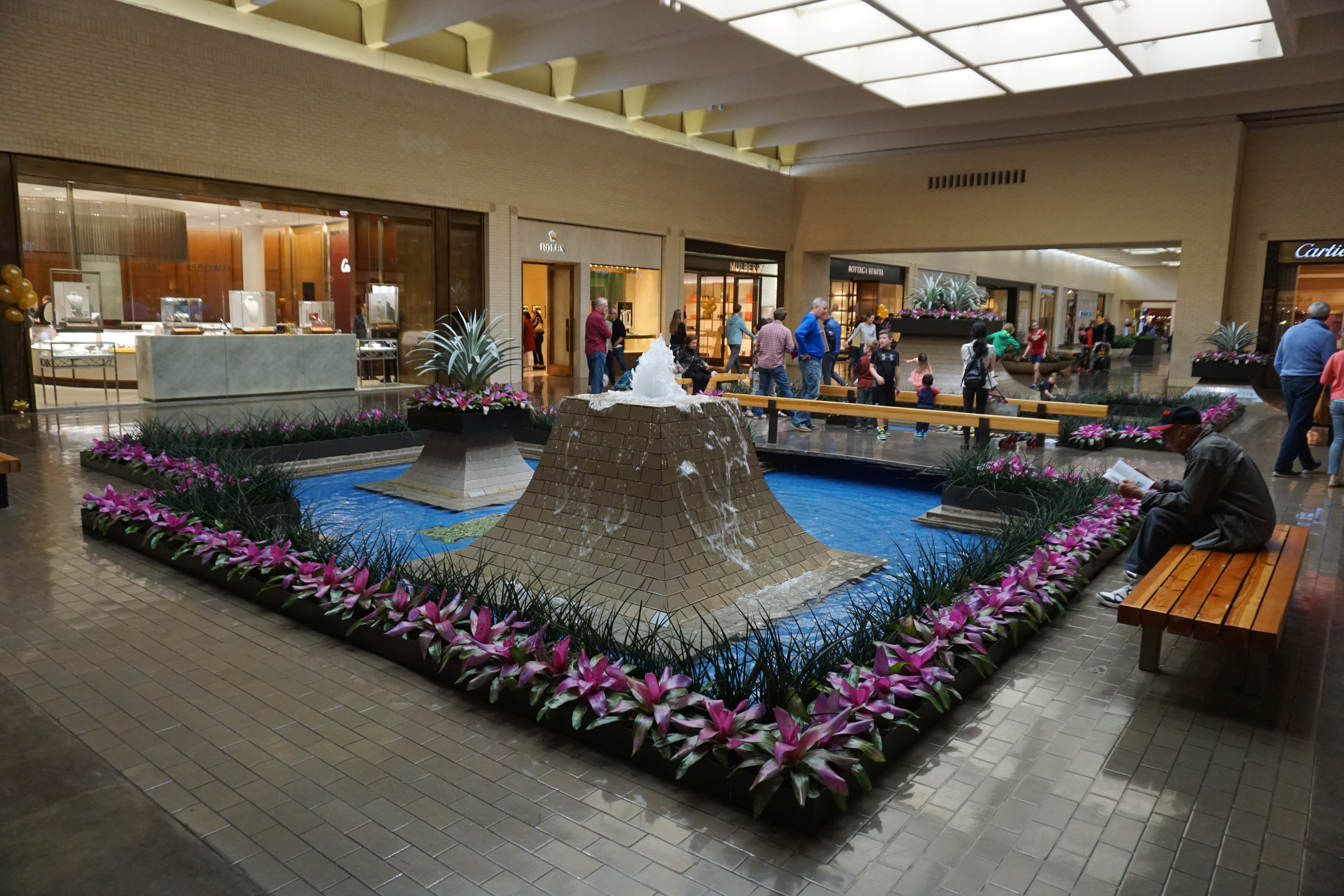
- Fountain in Neiman Marcus court
- Location: Dallas, Texas, United States
- Coordinates: 32°52′7″N 96°46′24″W
- Address: 8687 North Central Expressway (US 75)
- Opened: 1965
- Renovated: 2006
- Developer: The Nasher Company
- Owner: NorthPark Partners
- Architect: Harrell and Hamilton; Omniplan (2006 expansion)
- Num. of stores: 221
- Num. of anchor tenants: 7
- Floor area: 2,000,000 sq ft (185,800 m^{2})
- Floors: 3 (Note: 4 in Dillard's and Neiman Marcus)
- Parking: 9,000
- Public transit: DART: at Park Lane; Bus: Route 20
- Website: www.northparkcenter.com

NorthPark Center (or simply NorthPark) is an enclosed upscale shopping mall in Dallas, Texas (United States). Located at the intersection of Northwest Highway (Loop 12) and North Central Expressway (US 75), the 2-million-square-foot (190,000 m^{2}) mall is the largest in the Dallas–Fort Worth metroplex, the second-largest in Texas (behind The Galleria in Houston), and the 22nd-largest in the United States.

Opened on August 19, 1965 and expanded in 2006, the mall has over 200 stores, with annual sales totaling over $1 billion. It is anchored by Macy's, Dillard's, Nordstrom, Neiman Marcus, Eataly, Arhaus, and a 15-screen AMC multiplex.

The mall has been noted for its distinctive architecture and public art collection. In 2007, it was named one of the "Seven Retail Wonders of the Modern World" by the International Council of Shopping Centers.

== History ==
In the early 1960s, developer Raymond Nasher leased a 97-acre (390,000 m^{2}) cotton field on the edge of Dallas and hired E.G Hamilton of Harrell+Hamilton Architects. NorthPark Center opened in 1965, anchored by Neiman Marcus (which moved from Preston Center), Titche-Goettinger and Penney's; other stores included Woolworth's, Doubleday, and Kroger.

The first major expansion happened in 1973, when a new wing opened anchored by Lord & Taylor.

In early 2004, Lord & Taylor was repositioned and shuttered after being at the mall for nearly 30 years.

For its first 34 years, NorthPark stood on land leased from the Caruth family's foundation. David and Nancy A. Nasher (Raymond's daughter) purchased the property in 1999. In 2006, NorthPark opened to an expansion that more than doubled the size of the existing center, adding 88,000 square feet (8,200 m^{2}). For its expansion, NorthPark brought back the same architecture firm that designed the original section to ensure its aesthetic was respected and enhanced. The expansion also included a new collection of specialty retail shops and a third-floor 15-screen AMC theater. The two-story expansion provided for circulation around the Center by forming a continuous loop through the complex.

In November 2007, NorthPark Center was named one of the "seven retail wonders of the modern world" along with the Neiman Marcus store at Natick Collection in Massachusetts, Japan's Mikimoto store in Ginza, England's Bull Ring shopping center, Poland's Złote Tarasy in Warsaw, Apple's flagship store in New York City, and Italy's Galleria Vittorio Emanuele II.

NorthPark was the home of Texas' first H&M, a fashion label from Sweden. H&M has since closed its NorthPark Center store, and opened other locations in Texas.

The American Film Institute's Dallas International Film Festival was sponsored by NorthPark Center in 2009. The event was held in the AMC NorthPark 15 Theater, which also hosted screenings during the festival's first two years.

Barneys New York closed in April 2012 after having opened in 2006. The space is currently split between different stores, most notably Arhaus, which opened in 2014, and Eataly, which opened in December 2020.

NorthPark Mall has a currency exchange at Travelex and tax-free shopping with Texas sales tax refunds at TaxFree Shopping Ltd.

By 2023, NorthPark Center had announced several newest additions, among them are Rhone, Blue Nile, Breitling, Nike Rise, St. John, Buck Mason, Prada, Abercrombie & Fitch, Levi's, Jo Malone, Vuori, and Psycho Bunny.

== Art in the mall ==
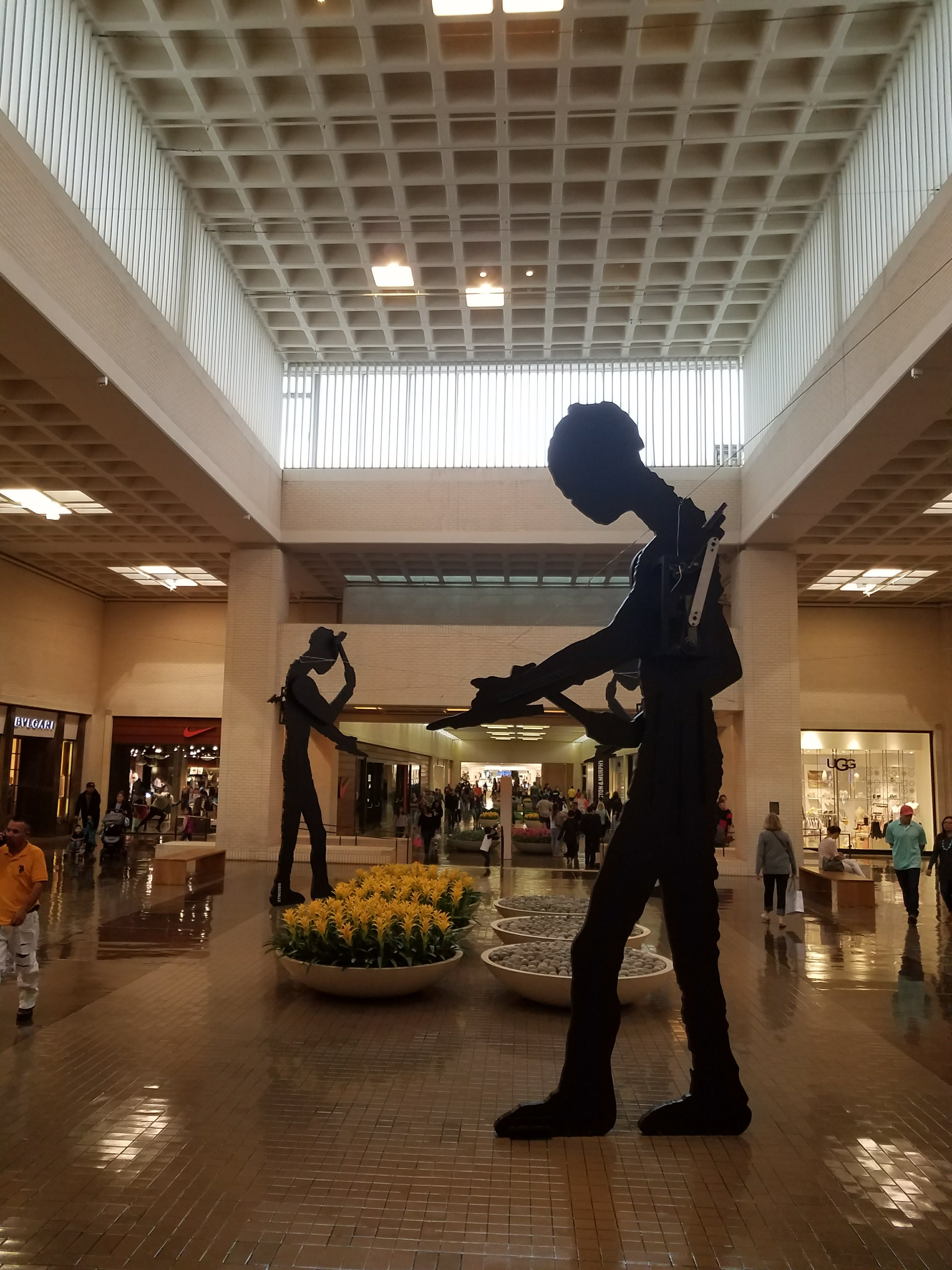
Five Hammering Men by Jonathan Borofsky

NorthPark Center was designed to include art as integral part of its interior landscape. NorthPark received the American Institute of Architects Award for "Design of the Decade - 1960s" as one of the first commercial centers in the United States to create space for the display of fine art.

== Architecture ==
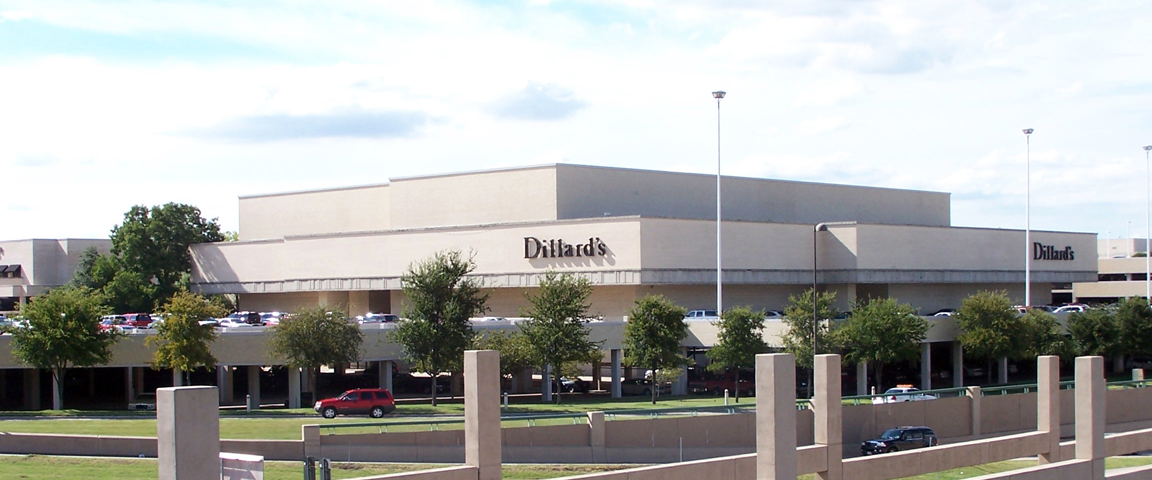
Dillard's

NorthPark Center was designed by Harrell & Hamilton in the early 1960s. For its recent expansion, NorthPark's owners returned to the architectural firm responsible for the 1960s design. The expansion turned NorthPark's original U-shape into a square design surrounding a 1.4-acre (5,700 m^{2}) landscaped garden known as "CenterPark." Featuring a series of lawns, 41-year-old live oaks and red oaks, seasonal flowers, crushed granite walkways, and a small collection of art, CenterPark doubles as a park area for visitors and customers.

NorthPark Center received both the Texas Society of Architects' annual Design Award and the 25-year Design Award in 2007 for the original design.

After a major expansion, at 2,350,000 square feet (218,000 m^{2}), it is now the second-largest mall in Texas and the 21st-largest in the U.S. based on total square feet of retail space (gross leasable area) according to the International Council of Shopping Centers.

== Public library ==
NorthPark Center hosts Bookmarks, a 1,993-square-foot (185.2 m^{2}) Dallas Public Library branch for children 12 years and younger. Bookmarks is the first children's library in the United States to be in a shopping center.

== Location ==
The Center is at the intersection of North Central Expressway and Loop 12/Northwest Highway, located to the east and south of the center respectively. NorthPark is also across the freeway from The Shops at Park Lane, a mixed-use development with which includes shopping. NorthPark Center is the most popular shopping center in North Texas, with over 27 million visitors a year.

== Television and film location ==
NorthPark's interior has been a location for scenes in television and film productions.

Dr. T and the Women, a Robert Altman film, has a scene in which the character Kate (played by Farrah Fawcett) visits stores in the area of the Neiman Marcus court, then is seen around the Dillard's court fountain—which she eventually finds herself in, frolicking and splashing in the buff.

True Stories, a 1986 movie written, directed by, and co-starring David Byrne, with one scene of a fashion show held at a mall in Virgil, Texas (the movie's fictional setting) during a town celebration; the interior portion of the scene was filmed in a mid-court area between Neiman Marcus and Dillard's. Byrne and co-star John Goodman were also filmed walking down one of the mall's corridors.

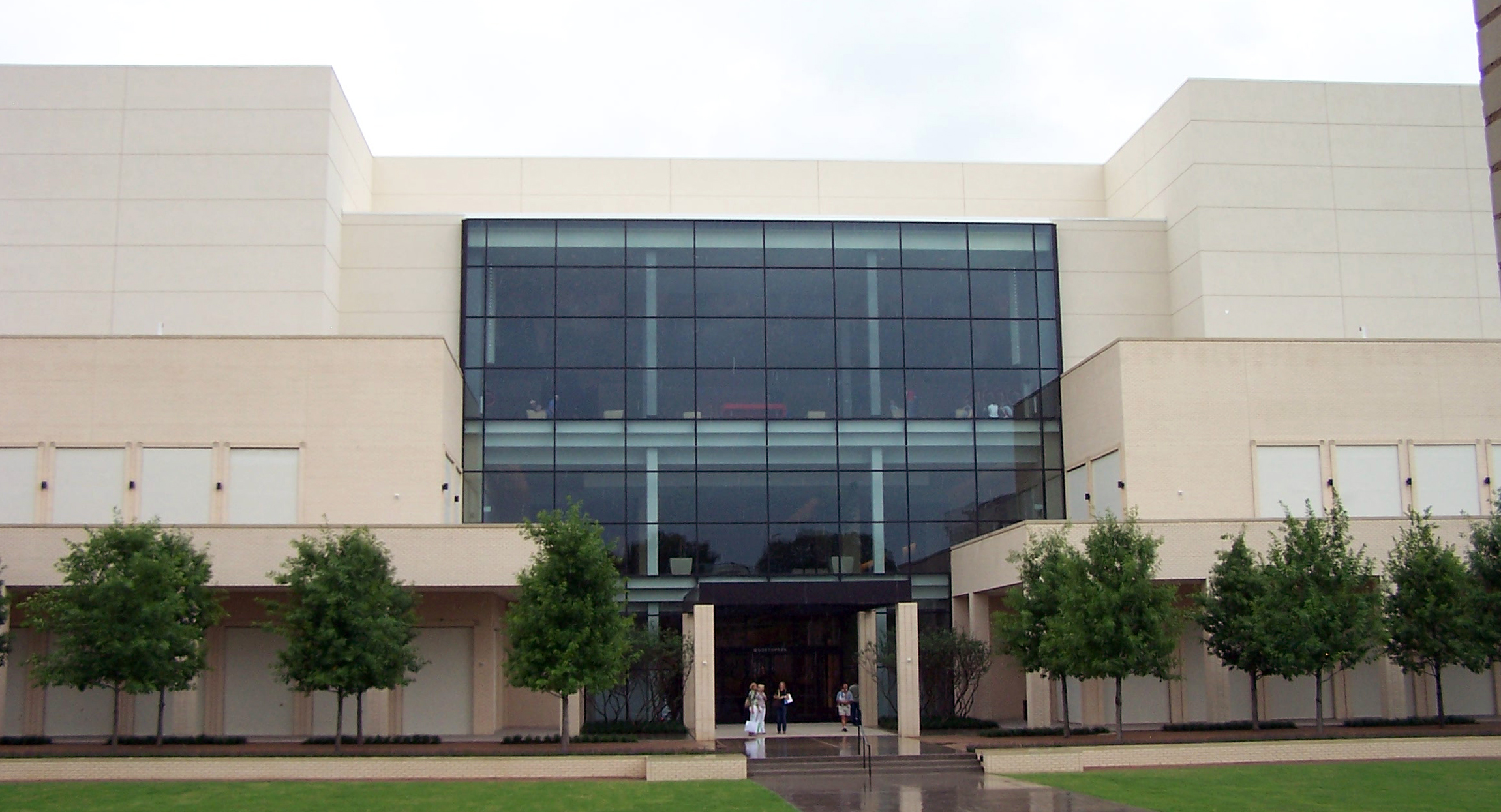
AMC

When the mall reopened in 2006, The Dallas Observer used the mall's ambiance as documented in the film as a source of comparison. "The place looks like a tricked-out spaceship compared to the stark, cold NorthPark in which True Stories was filmed exactly 20 years ago. It looks like the old NorthPark—damned if you can tell difference between the old bricks and the new ones; this thing looks like it was built in a time machine—yet it's brighter too, a friendlier version of the same ol' place." The exterior of Virgil's mall wasn't of NorthPark—the producers used the outside of the former Big Town Mall in nearby Mesquite.

== See also ==
- List of shopping malls in the Dallas/Fort Worth Metroplex
- List of largest shopping malls in the United States
