= Foley's =

Department store chain in the American southwest (1900–2006)

Foley's Foley Brothers
- Type: Department store
- Industry: Retail
- Founded: 1900
- Founder: Pat Foley, James Foley
- Defunct: September 9, 2006
- Fate: Acquired by Macy's
- Successor: Macy's
- Headquarters: United States, Houston, Texas
- Number of locations: 100 stores
- Products: Clothing, footwear, bedding, furniture, jewelry, beauty products, housewares
- Parent: Federated Department Stores, Inc (1947–1988, 2005–2006); The May Department Stores Company (1988–2005)

Foley's Department Store Final Logo

Foley's was a regional chain of department stores owned by Federated Department Stores (1947–1988, 2005–2006), later owned by May Department Stores (1988–2005) and headquartered in Downtown Houston, Texas. On August 30, 2005, the division was dissolved and operation of the stores was assumed by Federated's Macy's West and Macy's South divisions. Foley's operated stores in Arizona, New Mexico, Colorado, Oklahoma, Texas and Louisiana. On September 9, 2006, Foley's and all the regional May Co. stores names were phased out and rebranded as Macy's.

== History ==
This company was founded in 1900 by brothers Pat and James Foley, in Houston, Texas, as Foley Brothers. It was originally acquired by Federated Department Stores, Inc. in 1945.

In 1961, Foley's opened its first branch store at the Sharpstown Shopping Center and continued to add Houston branches over the next five decades. In the 1970s, Foley's opened stores in Austin and in the 1980s opened in San Antonio. By 1987, Foley's absorbed Federated's Dallas-based Sanger-Harris chain with stores in the Dallas/Fort Worth Metroplex; Oklahoma City, Oklahoma; Tulsa, Oklahoma; Tucson, Arizona; and Albuquerque, New Mexico.

In 1988, Federated was purchased by real estate developer Campeau Corporation, which immediately sold Foley's along with Filene's to May Department Stores to finance its deal. In two years Federated filed for bankruptcy, disassociated itself from Campeau, and merged with Campeau's other retail holding company Allied Stores. After its acquisition by May Company, Foley's closed several stores in Dallas it considered underperforming (including the downtown Dallas flagship store) and its Albuquerque, N.M., location, while also taking over two Lord & Taylor stores, one that was under construction in late 1988 at Penn Square Mall in Oklahoma City, part of the mall's 1986-1988 expansion (Opened Spring 1989), and the other at San Antonio's Shops at Rivercenter.

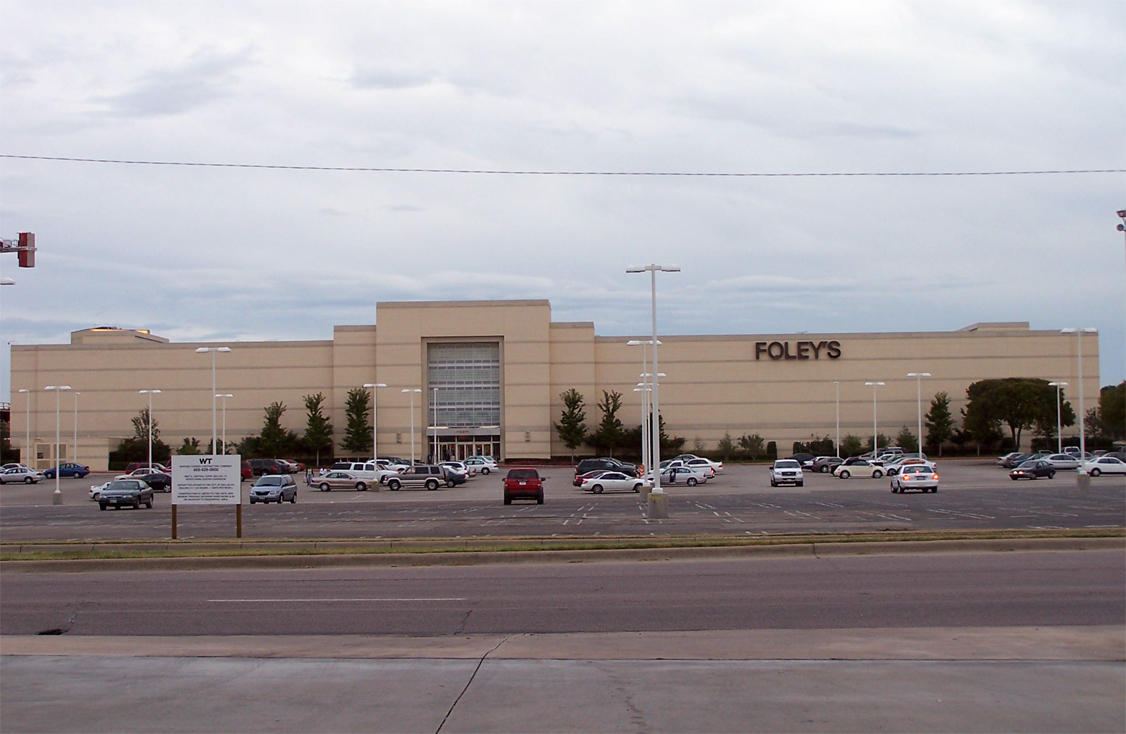
Foley's (now Macy's) at NorthPark Center in Dallas

Over the next decade, May spent heavily to build new stores, replace outdated stores and refurbish existing stores. In 1993, May Department Stores consolidated May Daniels & Fisher into Foley's, which brought Foley's to the Denver-Aurora, Colorado Springs, Boulder and Fort Collins-Loveland markets and re-introduced Foley's to the Albuquerque market. On February 2, 1997, the 2 Arizona locations (both in Pima County) were transferred to May's Robinsons-May division. In 2001, Foley's expanded into Louisiana after May Co. acquired several Maison Blanche locations that had become Parisian stores from Proffitt's (now Saks Incorporated).

Foley's was re-acquired by Federated when it took over May Department Stores on August 30, 2005. In 2006, Federated started the conversion of Foley's into Macy's. Soon advertisements started to read "Foley's – Now part of the Macy's Family". On September 9, 2006, the Foley's stores were renamed Macy's as part of Federated's nationwide rebranding of all former May locations. In 2005 Federated announced that it would close Foley's 1,200-employee headquarters in Downtown Houston.

The former Downtown Houston Foley's store was demolished on Sunday, September 22, 2013.

== Timeline ==
=== 1900s – 1951 ===
1900: Foley Brothers was opened by brothers Pat and James Foley, two young and enterprising Irishmen, on February 12 with $2000 borrowed from an uncle. The 1,400-square-foot (130 m^{2}) store located at 507 Main Street in Houston, Texas, was stocked with calico, linen, lace, pins, needles, and men's furnishings.

1905: With business booming, Pat and James purchased the building next door and added ready-to-wear clothing for women and children as well as millinery.

1911: The store moved to the 400 block of Main Street and was incorporated with capital of $150,000 (~$3.76 million in 2025).

1916: Foley Brothers ranked third in retail volume in Houston with $400,000 (~$8.16 million in 2025) in sales. The original 10 employees had grown to 150, and the company had 750 active charge accounts and 23,000 square feet (2,100 m^{2}) of space.

1917: Pat and James sold Foley Brothers to George S. Cohen and George's father, Robert, a Galveston merchant. Foley Bros. grew tremendously under this new management and by 1919, sales neared $1,000,000 (~$13.9 million in 2025).

1922: Foley Bros. moved into a three-story building next door to 400 Main Street. Later that year, the store became the city's largest department store. Shoes, a beauty shop, and radio sets were included.

1941: When the United States entered World War II, Foley Bros. diverted the efforts of the advertising and personnel departments to bond drives and other wartime services. All sales promotions were suspended during this time.

1945: Federated Department Stores president Fred Lazarus, Jr., came to Houston to visit his son, who was stationed at a nearby Army camp. Mr. Lazarus discovered that Foley Bros. was for sale and bought it.

1947: Foley's opened at 1110 Main Street on October 20 in downtown Houston. Federated spent $13 million to build this new store, which was heralded by the press as the nation's "most modern department store".

1951: The first official Foley's Thanksgiving Day Parade was held.

=== 1960–1999 ===
1960–1967: Sharpstown, Foley's first branch store opened. Pasadena, Almeda-Genoa, and Northwest stores soon followed.

1971–1979: Memorial City and Greenspoint opened in Houston, and Highland Mall opened in Austin.

1980–1987: San Jacinto, North Star, Willowbrook, Barton Creek, West Oaks, Ingram Park, Deerbrook, Post Oak, College Station, and Padre Staples opened.

Federated merges Foley’s and Dallas-based Sanger Harris as Foley’s.

1988: The May Department Stores Company acquired Foley's in Houston and Filene's in Boston from Federated.

1989-1991: Rolling Oaks Mall (San Antonio), The Parks at Arlington (Arlington), Tucson Mall, and Vista Ridge Mall (Lewisville) opened

1993: The May D&F division in Colorado and New Mexico was consolidated with Foley's, creating a 49-store division that was the largest in May Company.

1994–1998: Mall of Mainland, Temple, Woodlands, Northwest Austin, Sugar Land, Northwest Albuquerque, Laredo, and Park Meadows opened. Fort Collins reopened after extensive remodeling. Purchased Jones & Jones in McAllen, Texas, and converted to Foley's.

=== 2000–2006 ===
2000–2004: NorthPark Center, Broomfield, Hurst, Baybrook Mall, Beaumont, Cielo Vista, Houston Galleria, Lake Charles, Golden Triangle Denton, and Sunland opened, some at former Montgomery Ward sites. Foley's acquired one McRae's store and two Parisian stores in Louisiana. Cortana Mall and the Mall of Louisiana in Baton Rouge and Acadiana Mall in Lafayette joined Foley's. Memorial City and Baybrook reopened in new buildings.

2004: The May Department Stores Company acquired Marshall Field's, which was headquartered in Minneapolis, Minn. May's seven divisions now included Foley's, Filene's, Robinsons-May, Famous-Barr, Hecht's, Lord & Taylor, and Marshall Field's.

2005: La Cantera (San Antonio), Firewheel Shops (Garland), and Centerra (Loveland CO) opened. May and Federated Department Stores, Inc. announced plans to merge. The transaction closed in the third quarter, as a result of the merger Federated also in the process reacquired two of their former Department store chains Foley's & Filene's (Which Federated originally sold to May Company.) putting them back under the Federated Department Stores corporate umbrella for the first time since 1988.

2006: Domain Mall (Austin), and Northfield Stapleton (Denver CO) opened. On February 1, 2006, the Foley's organization in Houston was dissolved and operation of its locations in Louisiana, Oklahoma, and Texas (except El Paso) were assumed by Atlanta-based Macy's South while operation of locations in Arizona, Colorado, New Mexico, and El Paso, Texas were assumed by San Francisco–based Macy's West. On September 9, 2006, the Foley's nameplate was replaced as part of the Macy's nationwide rebranding of all former May Company locations.

== See also ==
- List of defunct department stores of the United States
- List of department stores converted to Macy's
