= Alexandria Mall =

- Location: Alexandria, Louisiana, U.S.
- Coordinates: 31°16′39″N 92°27′41″W
- Opened: August 1, 1973
- Developer: Paul Broadhead
- Manager: Jones Lang LaSalle
- Num. of stores: 80
- Num. of anchor tenants: 7 (4 open, 3 vacant)
- Floor area: 869,012 sq ft (80,733.9 m^{2})
- Floors: 1
- Parking: 4800 spaces
- Website: alexandriamall.com

Alexandria Mall is a shopping mall located in Alexandria, Louisiana, United States. It features Dillard's, JCPenney and Michaels as anchor stores.

== Mall history ==
In March 1972, Buddy Tudor's family-owned construction company from Pineville began construction of Alexandria Mall. The mall opened its doors on August 1, 1973 with over 30 stores, spanning nearly 500,000 sq ft (46,000 m^{2}) in total. It featured national department stores JCPenney and Sears (both of which replaced preexisting locations in Alexandria), regional chain Bealls (later Beall-Ladymon), based in Shreveport, Louisiana, and local department stores Weiss & Goldring, Gus Kaplan (later Green's) and Wellan's as anchors. Other original tenants included Piccadilly Cafeteria, Peoples Shoes, Lerner Shops and a two-screen cinema run by General Cinema Corporation.

In August 1986, an expansion to the mall was completed that doubled its size to 869,732 sq ft (80,800.7 m^{2}) and added 56 additional stores, including the department stores Dillard's and Mervyn's (the latter of which opened that October due to a delay in construction), and a food court dubbed "The Market Place". Concurrently, portions of the existing mall were renovated, and the two-screen cinema was replaced with a six-screen multiplex on the mall's periphery. In honor of the mall's expansion, local pizza chefs cooked a 650-pound (290 kg) pizza.

In July 1989, Wellan's closed after failing to pay rent for seven months; the Alexandria Mall store was the chain's last remaining location. In 1994, Beall-Ladymon was acquired by Stage Stores and renamed to Stage. In November of that year, a renovation of the Sears wing of the mall and its entrance was completed, and part of the former Wellan's became a Sam Goody store; Stein Mart filled the remainder of the space in October 1995.

In February 2001, General Growth Properties (GGP) took over leasing and management of the mall. It was then sold to J. Herzog Properties of Denver, Colorado in 2004, with GGP retaining its management role. Mervyn's closed in January 2006, followed soon by the closure of Stein Mart on April 30. In March 2007, Burlington Coat Factory opened in the former Mervyn's location, while Weiss & Goldring relocated outside the mall into a former Firestone tire center that was converted into a strip mall. Bed Bath & Beyond opened in 2008 in the previous location of Weiss & Goldring, and the former Stein Mart became a children's play place called Slinkee's.

GGP handed over management of the mall to Jones Lang LaSalle in 2010. Both Slinkee's and the neighboring Lagniappe Theater Company had their leases terminated on September 29, 2015, as the mall was under negotiations to convert their spaces into a Conn's store, which opened on February 13, 2016.

In September 2018, Sears closed as part of the chain's plan to close 72 stores nationwide. Stage closed in early 2019. Bed Bath & Beyond closed in March 2023, and Michaels opened in its place later that year. In fall 2024, Burlington Coat Factory moved to the nearby MacArthur Village shopping center, and Conn's closed as part of the chain's bankruptcy proceedings.

Chick-Fil-A closed their Mall location on December 31, 2025.
