= Bealls =

Bealls is the name of three unrelated American retail chains:

- Bealls (Florida-based department store), a Florida-based department store also known as Burke's Outlet
- Bealls (Texas-based department store), a defunct Texas-based department store which closed all operations in 2020
- Beall-Ladymon, sometimes also called Bealls, a department store chain based in Louisiana and purchased by Stage Stores in 1994
