= Gordmans =

Defunct American retailer

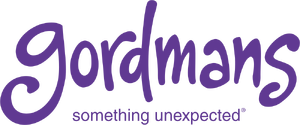
- Formerly: Outfitters to the Family (1915–1948); Richman Gordman (1948–1996)
- Type: Subsidiary
- Traded as: Nasdaq: GMAN
- Industry: Retail
- Founded: 1915; 111 years ago in Omaha, Nebraska (original run); 2022; 4 years ago (revival)
- Founder: Sam Richman; Dan Gordman
- Defunct: 2020 (original run)
- Fate: Chapter 11 bankruptcy liquidation
- Headquarters: Omaha, Nebraska, U.S.
- Number of locations: 0 (August 2022)
- Area served: United States
- Products: Clothing, footwear, bedding, furniture, jewelry, beauty products, small kitchen appliances and housewares
- Parent: Stage Stores (2017-2020); BrandX.com (2022-present)
- Website: Archived official website at the Wayback Machine (archive index)

Gordmans was an American retailer founded in Omaha, Nebraska. The chain is owned by BrandX as of May 2022. In 2019, Stage Stores began converting other retail chains it owned into Gordmans stores, with the goal of having 700 Gordmans stores in 42 states by the end of 2020. In May 2020, Stage Stores filed for Chapter 11 bankruptcy and began liquidating its stores. Although a buyer for Stage could have prevented liquidation, Stage later announced that they would proceed with going out of business sales at all locations.

== History ==
=== Richman-Gordman ===
The company's origins date back to the early 20th century when Sam Richman opened a small clothing store in Omaha in 1915. Richman's Outfitters to the Family occupied a small storefront at 16th and Chicago in downtown Omaha. Dan Gordman joined Richman as a full partner in the business and married his daughter Esther. After several years, the business grew to occupy the entire building at 16th and Chicago. In 1948, a second store was opened in South Omaha, Nebraska, and Gordman purchased Richman's remaining interest in the company, and changed the name to Richman Gordman.

During the 1960s, Gordman's sons and nephew joined the business and positioned the company for more aggressive expansion. In the early 1970s, the company expanded beyond Nebraska. Richman Gordman opened two stores in Des Moines, Iowa, followed by another location in Topeka, Kansas. Its 10th store opened in Grand Island, Nebraska, in 1974. Gordman was among the first to incorporate central checkouts, shopping carts, and self-service shoes to Omaha and was also one of the first stores to be open on Sundays.

=== ½ Price Stores ===
Modernized identities for both chains designed by Joe Selame, introduced in 1984

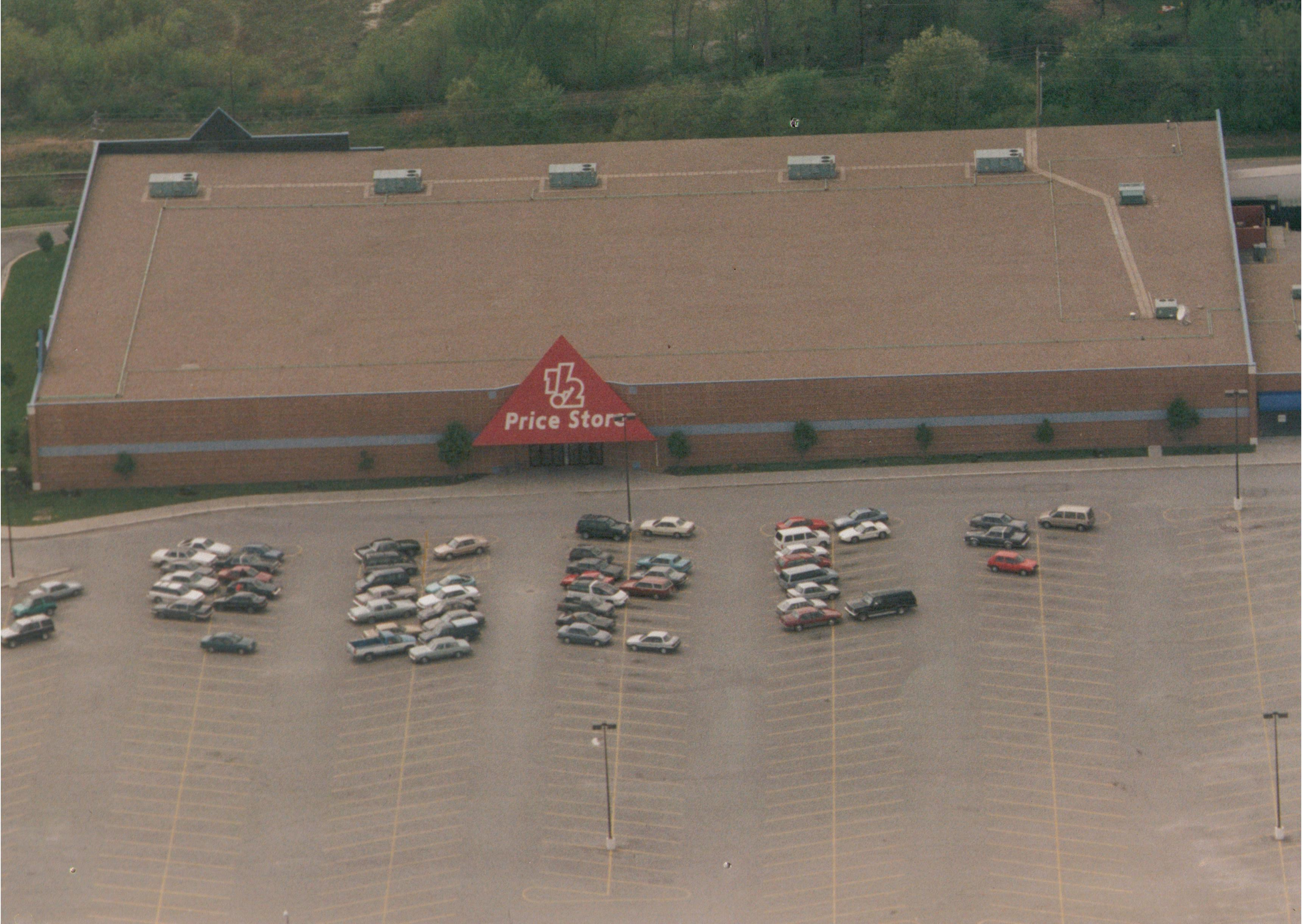
½ Price Store in Independence, Missouri, later a Gordmans location (now closed)

In 1975, Gordmans stores locations of 19 states New York, Ohio, Illinois, Tennessee, Virginia, Nebraska, Iowa, Indiana, Kansas, Kentucky, Texas, Pennsylvania, Colorado, Utah, North Carolina, Missouri, Wisconsin, Michigan, Minnesota, test store in South Omaha at 25th and L Streets named the ½ Price Store. The concept was to sell Richman Gordman merchandise at half price. This led to the opening of six more ½ Price Stores in the 1970s; a separate corporate structure was built to accommodate the growing business. By the company's 75th anniversary in 1990, it operated 16 ½ Price Store off-price department stores and 16 Richman Gordman department stores. In 1992, however, Richman Gordman filed for bankruptcy protection, and all of its department stores closed. The off-price department store division became the company's sole focus after it emerged from bankruptcy under the Richman Gordman ½ Price Stores name in 1993.

== Gordmans and bankruptcy ==
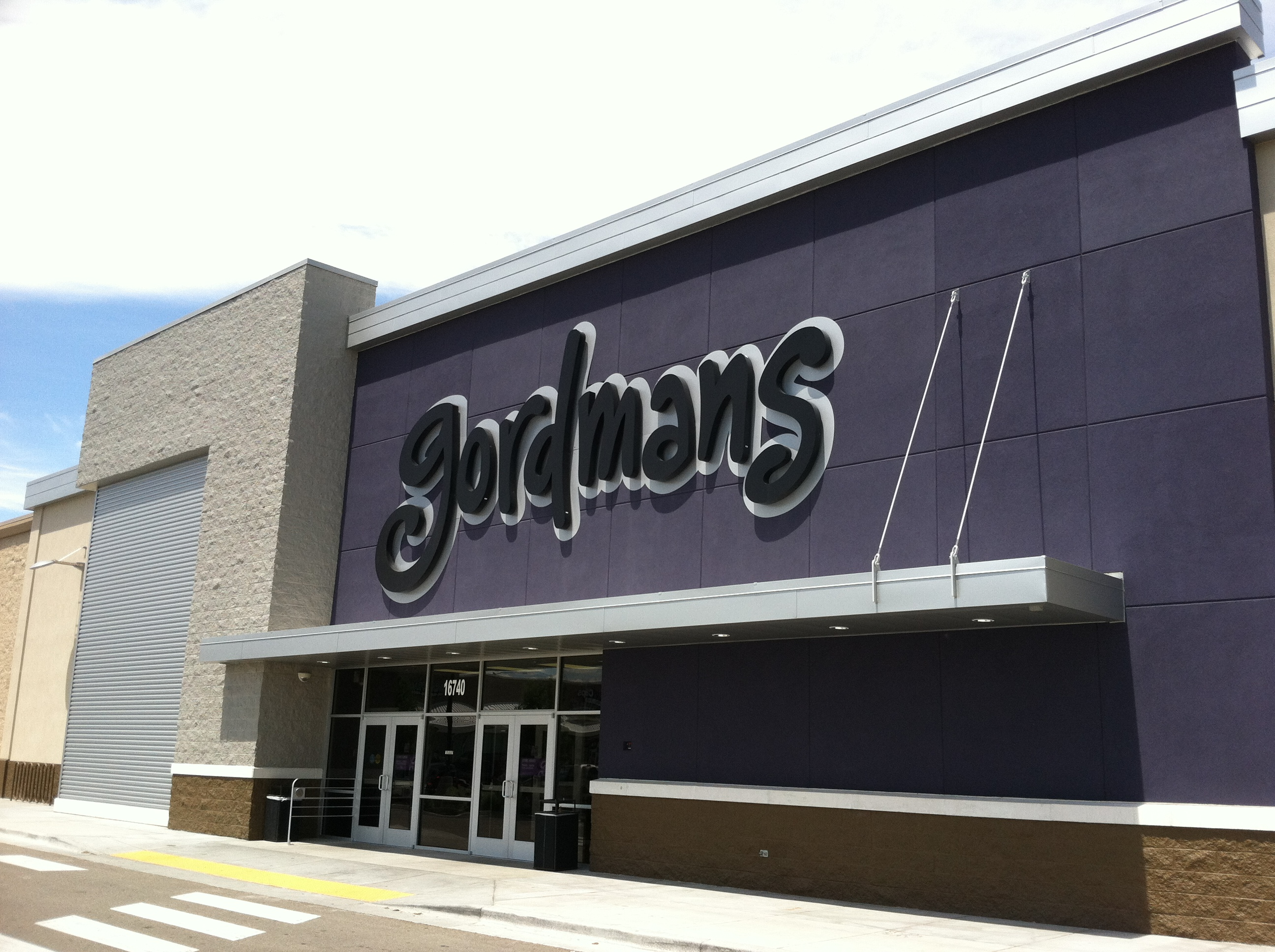
A Gordmans store in Nampa, Idaho

The company decided to develop a new prototype store and attempted to improve the store's presentation. The first two Gordmans stores opened in Tulsa, Oklahoma in August 1999, and the rest of the 1/2 Price Stores chain would be renamed by the end of the year.

Sun Capital Partners bought the company in 2008. It was taken public again in 2010 with Sun continuing to hold a majority stake.

On March 6, 2017, Bloomberg reported that Gordmans was reportedly preparing to file for bankruptcy. On March 13, 2017, Bloomberg announced that Gordmans had indeed filed for bankruptcy in Nebraska (In re Gordmans Stores Inc., 17-80304, U.S. Bankruptcy Court, District of Nebraska (Omaha)) with a liquidation deal struck with Tiger and Great American.

=== Stage Stores ===
Through the bankruptcy, Stage Stores bought 48 Gordmans stores in March 2017, along with one distribution center, the Gordmans name, and all intellectual property.

Under the direction of Stage Stores, Gordmans began to transition away from the specialty department store business model, moving the brand to the off-price retail sector, more resembling stores like T.J. Maxx, Marshalls, Ross, and Burlington. As part of expanding the brand, Stage Stores opening their first new Gordmans store in Rosenberg, Texas in March, 2018.

In March 2019, Stage announced that by mid-2020 they planned to convert at least 220 of their current department stores, including those of other brand names, into Gordmans off-price stores. CEO Michael Glazer cited the high sales increases in the locations that were converted in 2018 as the deciding factor in the decision.

In September 2019, Stage Stores announced that they planned to completely exit the department store market, moving completely to the off-price model, converting all other stores brands to the Gordmans brand, and operating approximately 700 Gordmans stores by the third quarter of fiscal 2020 (August–October). But in May 2020, Stage Stores filed for Chapter 11 bankruptcy due to the COVID-19 pandemic, even though the ongoing conversions had resulted in same-store sales rising more than 17% in the November–January fiscal quarter. All Gordmans stores were closed on or before September 27, 2020.

=== BrandX ===
On May 25, 2022, Gordmans, along with Stage, Bealls, Palais Royal, Peebles, Goody's, The Bon-Ton, Bergner's, Boston Store, Carson's, Elder-Beerman, Herberger's, and Younkers, were all acquired by BrandX, with intentions to bring all of these brands back around 2022-2023.
