= Northwest Arkansas Mall =

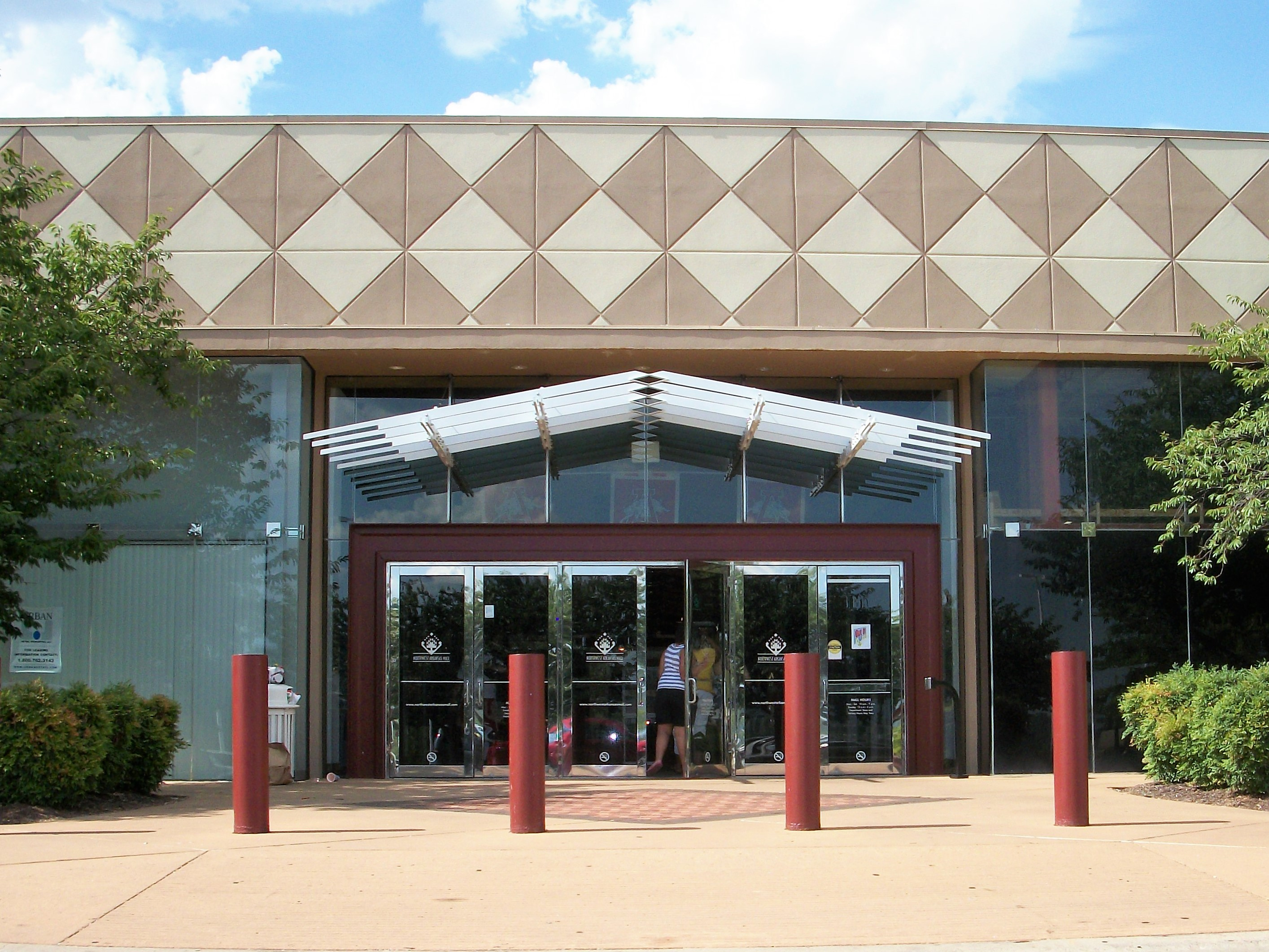
- Location: Fayetteville, Arkansas, United States
- Coordinates: 36°07′42″N 94°08′52″W
- Opened: March 2, 1972; 54 years ago
- Developer: General Growth Properties
- Manager: Mason Asset Management
- Owner: Namdar Realty Group
- Num. of stores: 100+
- Num. of anchor tenants: 4 (3 open, 1 vacant)
- Floor area: 820,581 square feet (76,000 m^{2})
- Floors: 1 (2 in both Dillard's locations and JCPenney)
- Public transit: Ozark Regional Transit
- Website: northwestarkansasmall.com

Northwest Arkansas Mall is a shopping mall located in Fayetteville, Arkansas. Currently, the mall features more than 100 specialty stores, and is anchored by the aforementioned Dillard's stores and JCPenney. The mall is managed by Manson Asset Management and is owned by Namdar Realty Group

== History ==
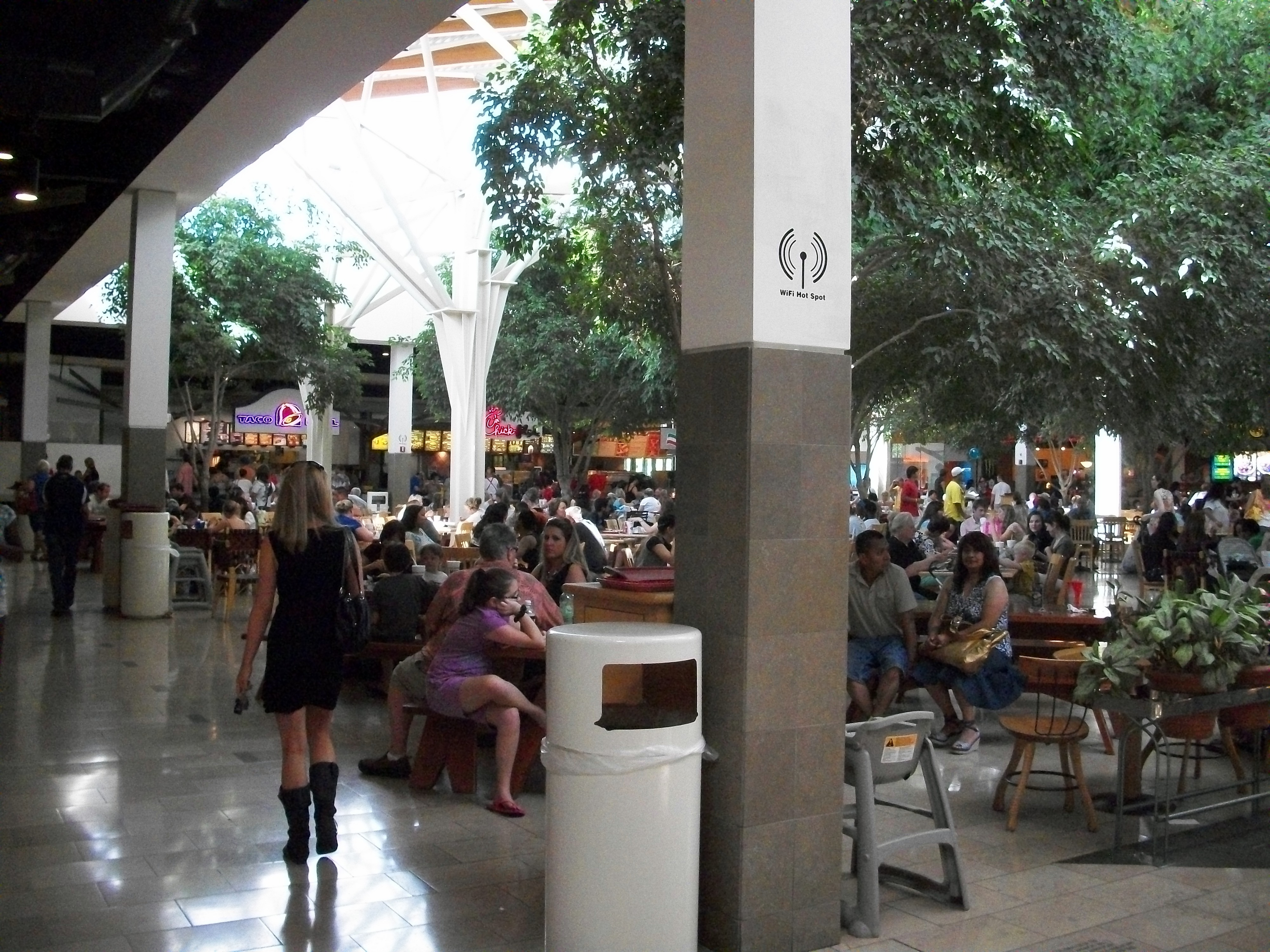
Food Court

The mall opened as Northwest Arkansas Plaza, a single-level mall of 570,000 square feet (53,000 m^{2}) leasable square feet. It was developed by General Growth Properties, and among the original tenants were Sears, Dillard's, and F. W. Woolworth Company. Other tenants included Osco Drug, The Jean Joint, Beall's, The Boston Store and Malco Theatres. Construction began in late 1977 on another anchor store, JCPenney, which opened in 1978.

A major renovation and expansion was done between the spring of 1995 and spring of 1999. Over 300,000 square feet (28,000 m^{2}) were added, existing stores relocated and/or enlarged and two new anchor stores constructed. The original JCPenney was replaced with a larger store, with the original structure being partially demolished. Half of its area became a Pincic Food Court of 12 fast-food restaurants. On the opposite end of the mall, a second Dillard's was built, which would house a Men's and Children's Store. The original Dillard's became a Women's Store. The final project in the renovation was an enlargement of the existing Sears. With all reconstruction work completed, the shopping hub, which had been renamed as Northwest Arkansas Mall, encompassed 820,581 square feet (76,234.5 m^{2}) leasable square feet.

On November 2, 2017, it was announced that Sears would be closing as part of a plan to close 63 stores nationwide. The store closed in January 2018.

== Gallery ==
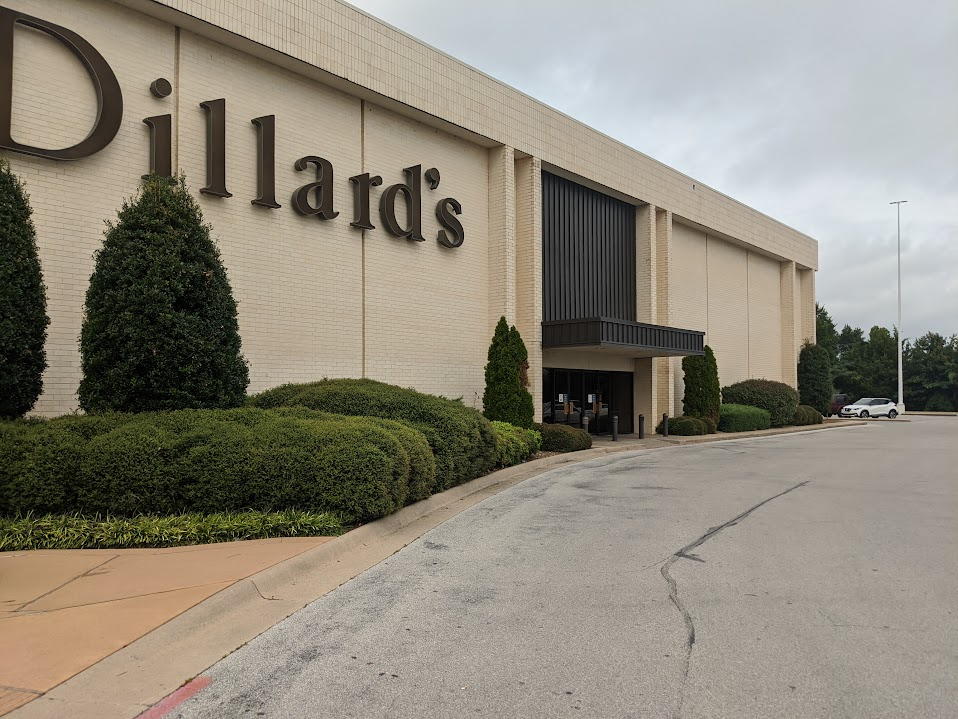
Dillard's Women's, September 2020

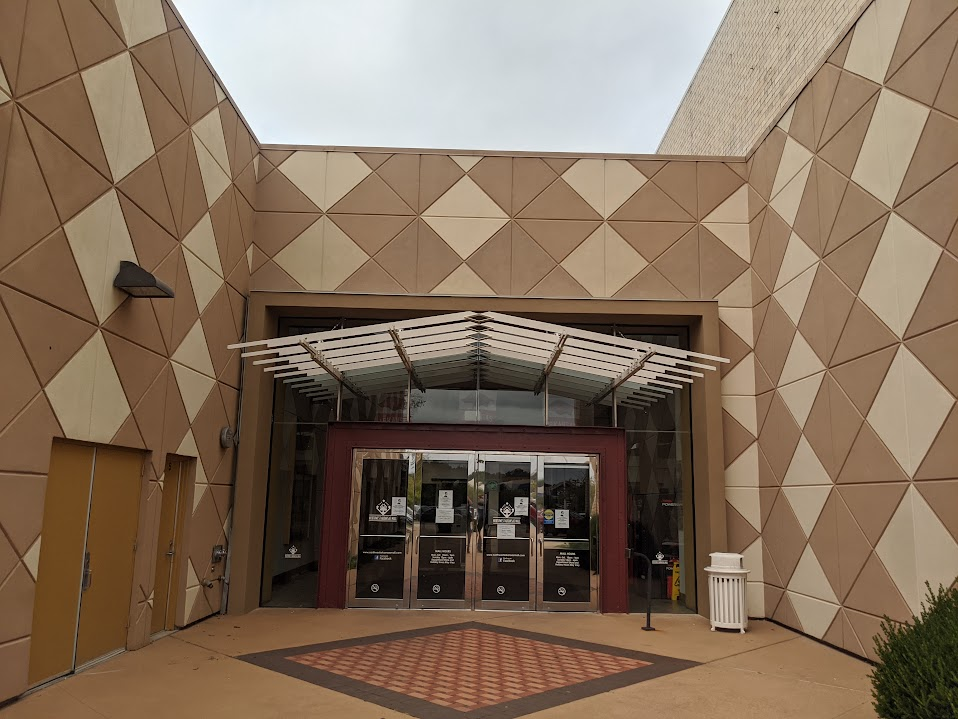
Northeast Mall Entrance, September 2020

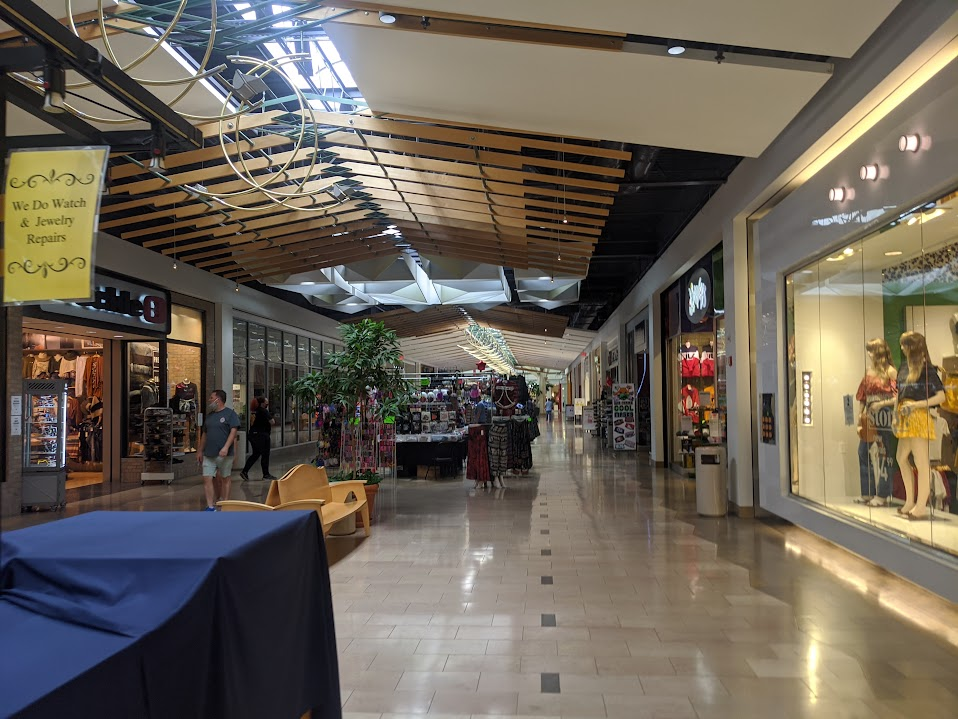
Hallway, September 2020

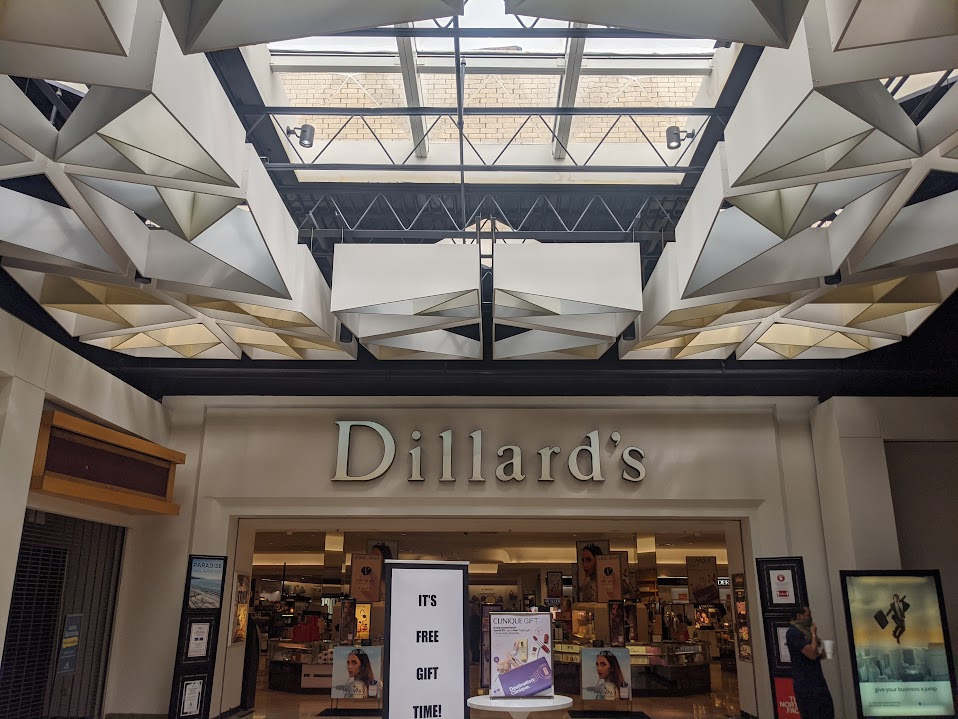
Dillard's Women's Entrance, September 2020

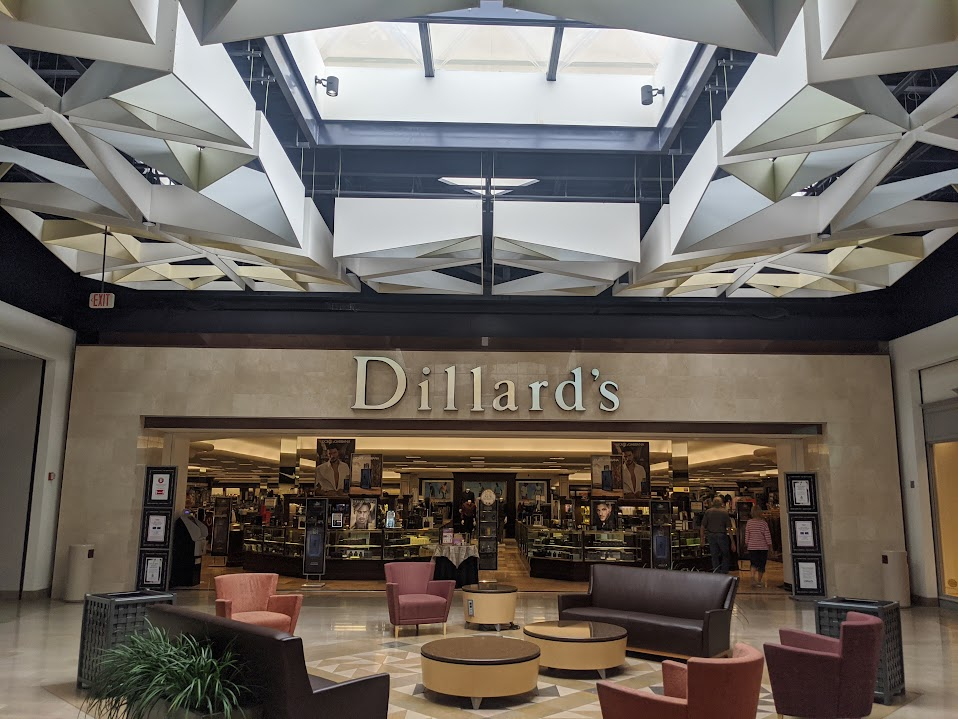
Dillard's Men's Entrance, September 2020

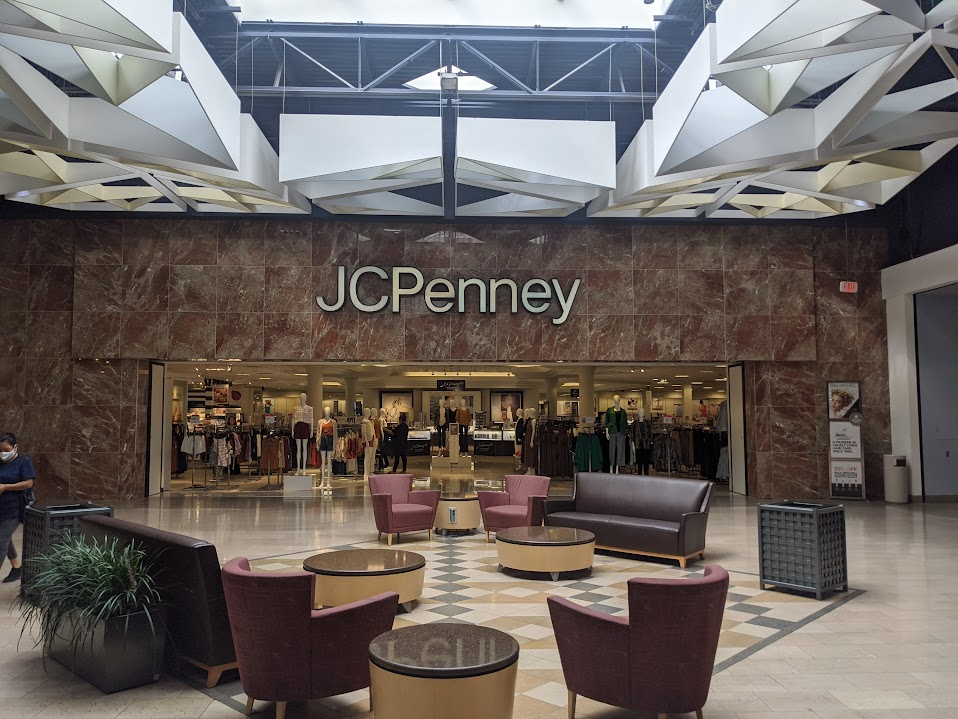
JCPenney Entrance, September 2020

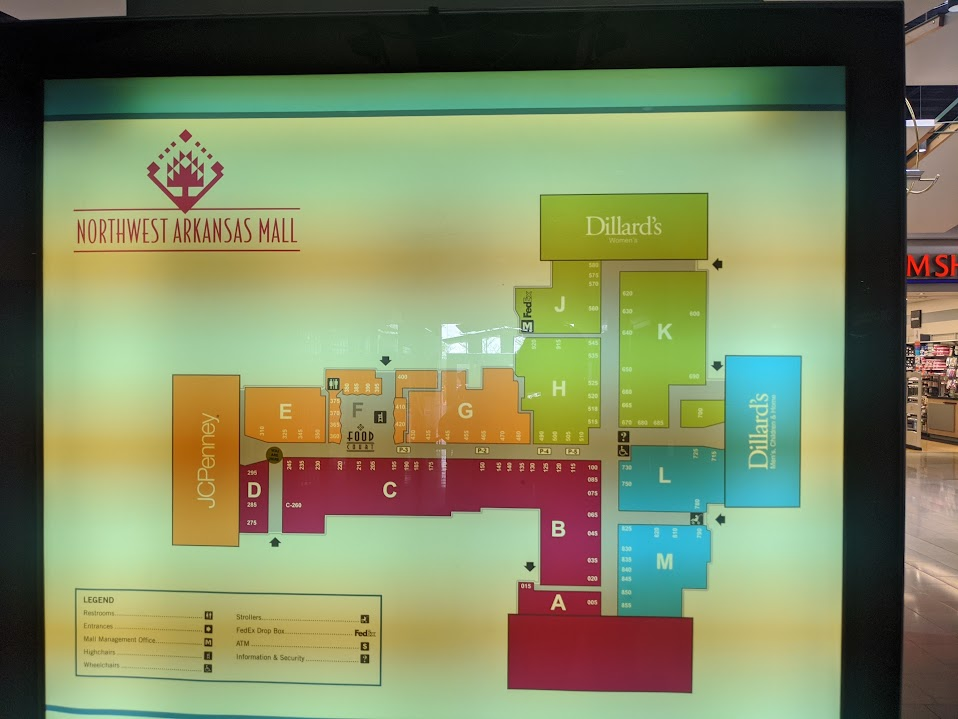
Mall Directory, September 2020

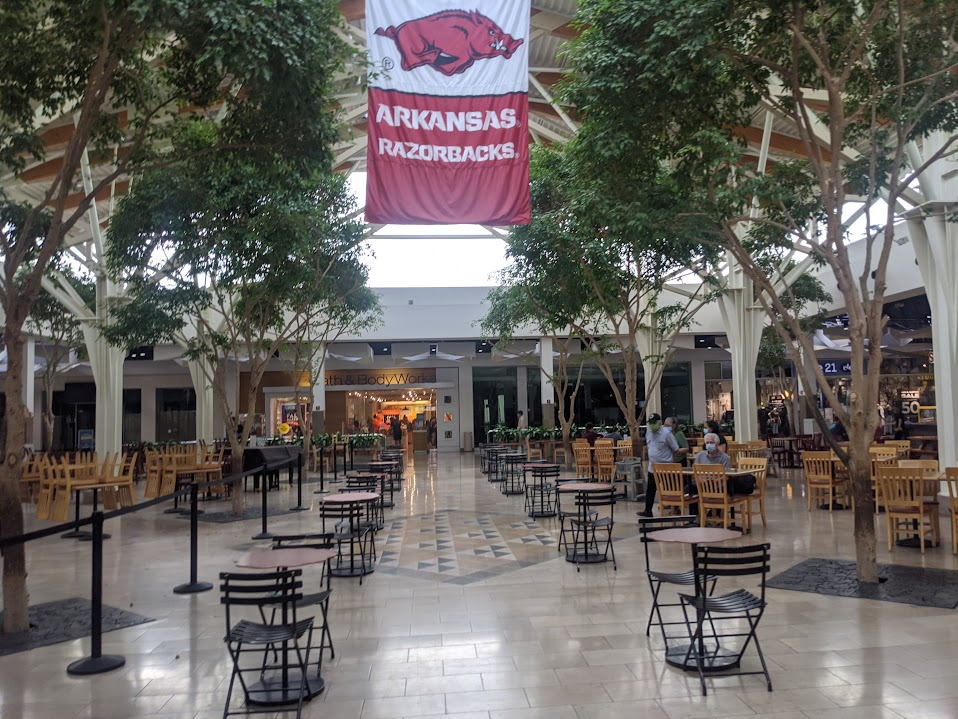
Food Court, September 2020
