= Northwest Mall =

Defunct mall in Houston, Texas, U.S.

- Location: Lazybrook/Timbergrove, Houston, Texas, United States
- Coordinates: 29.7992°N 95.4541°W
- Address: 9500 Hempstead Road
- Opened: October 24, 1968; 58 years ago
- Closed: March 31, 2017; 9 years ago (mall interior); December 31, 2021; 4 years ago (final tenant Carolyn Thompson's Antique Center)
- Demolished: April 9, 2026 – May 11, 2026
- Developer: The Rouse Company
- Owner: Levcor, Inc.
- Architect: Ray Bailey Architects
- Num. of anchor tenants: 2 (both vacant)
- Floor area: 794,092 sq ft (73,773.6 m^{2})
- Floors: 1 (2 each in former JCPenney's/Carolyn Thompson's Antique Center and Foley's/Macy's)
- Parking: asphalt surface lot
- Public transit: METRO Routes 26, 58, 66, 71, 85

Northwest Mall was a shopping mall located in the Lazybrook/Timbergrove neighborhood of Houston, Texas near the intersection of U.S. Route 290 and Loop 610. The mall opened in October 1968, two weeks after its sister property, Almeda Mall, opened on the south side of Houston. Both Northwest and Almeda were developed by the Rouse Co., through subsidiaries Northwest Mall, Inc. and Almeda Mall, Inc. respectively. The malls were nearly twins of each another. Northwest Mall was originally anchored by JCPenney and Foley's, with Woolworth's, Palais Royal, and Houston based Battelstein's as its three junior anchors.

The mall had 794,092 square feet (73,773.6 m^{2}) of leasable space.

Due to poor performance, high vacancy rates, and severe disrepair and damage from Hurricane Ike and Hurricane Harvey, Northwest Mall closed permanently on March 31, 2017.

The last remnant of the mall, Carolyn Thompson's Antique Center, which operated on the first floor of the original JCPenney's anchor, closed on December 31, 2021. The mall is now fully vacant, and demolition has begun as of April 9, 2026 and has been demolished as of May 11, 2026.

== History ==
Northwest Mall, along with its Northwest 4 Theatres, located on the northeast side of the property, opened to the public in October 1968. The movie theater was operated by AMC. AMC Northwest 4 was one of the first multi-screen theatres built in Houston.

Upon opening, the mall featured anchors JCPenney, who owned their two-story building and surrounding parking lot with auto center, and Foley's, who also owned their own two-story building, surrounding parking lot, and automotive center, with the remainder of the property being owned by the mall itself. This resulted in the land being owned by three separate parties. Other original occupants in the mall include Piccadilly Cafeteria, Palais Royal, Lane Bryant, Lerner Shops, Susie's, Battelstein's, Farrell's Ice Cream Parlour, Gordon's Jewellers, and Thom McAn shoes.

On July 11, 2000, after liquidating the inventory of the store, JCPenney closed their Northwest Mall location. The building remained vacant until Carolyn Thompson's Antique Center moved into the long-vacant space in 2012, a result of the antique center losing its own long-time home on Old Katy Road as a result of a widening expansion to Interstate 610.

SRO sports bar, which had relocated to Northwest Mall in the summer of 2001, announced its closing Feb. 2013. SRO was replaced with La Chapa sports bar, which closed in 2018, shortly after the mall itself. SRO had replaced the back half of the former F. W. Woolworth's junior anchor spot. The mall entrance to Woolworth's was transformed into an independent film theater.

In 2006, the mall was about 64% occupied. During that year Glimcher Realty Trust put the mall up for sale, along with the Almeda Mall. In 2007, Levcor Inc purchased the main mall, giving them approximately 80% ownership of the property with only the former Foley's, later Macy's, having its own independent owner. Macy's closed in 2008 after Hurricane Ike.

There was a Native American museum, Southern Apache Museum, that opened in 2012. It closed in 2017 due to redevelopment.

With the closure, only Carolyn Thompson's Antique Center, Palais Royal, La Chapa sports bar, and the Post Oak Club remained open at Northwest. All mall entrances were closed and boarded. After the 2017 closing, the only business operating at the mall was the Antique Center in the former JCPenney. Its mall entrance no longer exists, having been walled off shortly before Northwest's closure, with only the lower ground floor open to the general public. On December 31, 2021, Carolyn Thompson's Antique Center closed, leaving the mall vacant.

Northwest Mall has been named the preferred site to demolish and develop the acreage into the south terminus hub for the eventual high-speed rail line between Houston and Dallas.

== Hurricane Ike ==
Due to storm damage caused by Hurricane Ike, in 2008, both Bath & Body Works and Macy's closed their respective locations at Northwest Mall. Damages to the mall were further exacerbated by Hurricane Harvey in 2017.

Neither store reopened before the entire mall closed for business in 2017, although Macy's had claimed that Northwest's store closing was only temporary pending repairs to the anchor building. Macy's website no longer reflects the Northwest Mall location.

== Redevelopment ==
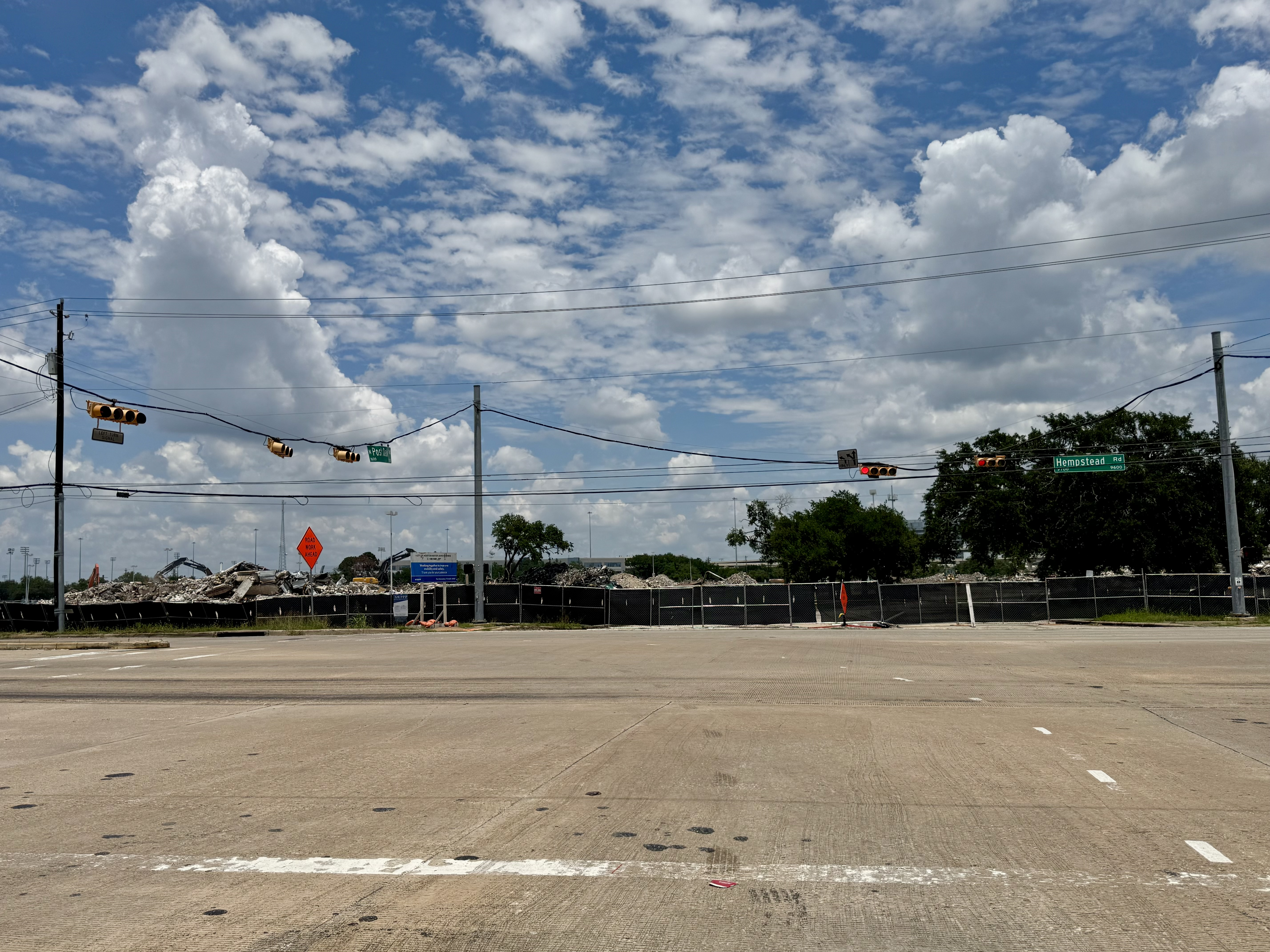
Northwest Mall shown here demolished as of May 25, 2026.

The mall, owned by Houston-based Levcor, is in the early planning stages of a redevelopment; but due to the planned city redevelopment of nearby Hempstead Highway, the shopping center is waiting to see what land they could potentially lose to eminent domain before proceeding.

The site of the mall was one of three alternatives for the Houston passenger terminal of the Texas Central Railway, a high speed rail line connecting Houston and Dallas. The other two alternatives were the industrial site directly southwest of the mall and the nearby METRO Northwest Transit Center. The mall was chosen as the station site in 2018.
