= B. C. Moore & Sons =

Department store chain

B.C. Moore & Sons Co.
- Company type: Department store
- Industry: Retail
- Founded: 1923
- Headquarters: Wadesboro, North Carolina
- Products: Clothing, footwear, bedding, furniture, jewelry, beauty products, and housewares.
- Website: www.stagestores.com

B.C. Moore and Sons was a department store chain founded in 1923 in North Carolina.

Beauregard Crawford Moore, better known as "Croft", opened his first retail store in downtown Wadesboro, North Carolina in 1923. With the assistance of his four sons and nephew, nineteen locations were serving the two Carolinas by 1933. After Mr. Moore retired in the early 1930s, son W. Bryan Moore took responsibility of the growing chain as president and general manager. Through his leadership, the company opened new stores throughout the southeast at the rate of more than one per year, and Moore's also developed a wholesale operation.

At the company's incorporation in 1946, twenty-nine stores were in operation. Buying offices, warehouses and accounting facilities were established early in the formation of the company. Administrative offices, including buying and advertising departments, were in Cheraw, South Carolina, with accounting and credit offices in Wadesboro, and distribution centers in Cheraw and Cordele, Georgia.

Moore's was acquired by Stage Stores Inc. in 2006. All Moore's locations were renamed Peebles by mid-to-late 2006.
