= Bealls (Texas-based department store) =

American department store chain

- Trade name: Bealls
- Type: Department store
- Industry: Retail
- Founded: 1923 (103 years ago) Henderson, Texas
- Fate: Bankruptcy (Now Online Retailer)
- Headquarters: Houston, Texas
- Products: Apparel, accessories, cosmetics, footwear, and housewares
- Parent: Stage Stores (1988–2020); BrandX.com (2022-present)
- Website: https://stores.bealls.com/tx/

Bealls /ˈbɛlz/ was a Texan chain of department stores, owned by Stage Stores Inc. and headquartered in Houston, Texas. The store specialized in retailing desirable brand name apparel, accessories, cosmetics, footwear, and housewares.

On May 11, 2020, it was announced that Stage had filed for bankruptcy and they soon began liquidating all locations.

The chain overlapped with the Florida-based Bealls chain, although the two were not related. In markets where the two chains overlapped, the Florida chain operates as Burkes Outlet instead. However in October 2020 Stage sold its intellectual property, including the national rights to use the Bealls name, to the Florida-based Bealls chain.

== History ==
The first Beall store was opened in Henderson, Texas, in 1923 by brothers Archie and Robbie (and later, Willie) Beall. The Bealls opened a second store in Nacogdoches in 1926 and a third in Mt. Pleasant in 1927.

By 1930, there were seven stores in the chain. The Beall brothers won bids for the business of J.L. Douglas, a Jacksonville merchant. This move would establish Jacksonville as a permanent home office for the growing chain (as well as its eighth store). The Beall brothers decided to file for incorporation of the chain during this time.

In 1935, the home office moved to the Mayfield Building in downtown Jacksonville. The Jacksonville store location would move in 1936 from the old Douglas building to the corner of Main and Commerce streets, where it would remain for nearly 50 years. By 1940, Bealls had 15 stores in the chain.

Despite World War II, store count by 1950 had grown to 19. Continued growth of the chain led to 38 locations by 1957. Bealls shifted their home office and warehousing to a new location on East Rusk Street in Jacksonville, east of downtown. In the 1960s, a chain-wide modernization of store interiors and operations was underway and more name-brand items could be found in stores.

In 1972, Bealls had grown to 60 stores in Texas and found its way beyond the borders of its home state for the first time, with a location opened in Oklahoma. Bealls had reached most parts of Texas, except for the far west and the Panhandle. Meanwhile, three of Robbie Beall's sons were now in high-level positions with the company; Royce and Ray were now vice-presidents and R.G. was serving as president of Bealls.

The 1980s brought more changes on the homefront. Buying operations were moved away from Jacksonville to the Las Colinas area of Irving, Texas, in 1983. This move ensured close proximity to many manufacturer's representatives of the apparel industry; most had local offices and showrooms in the Dallas Market Center area. By 1984, Bealls moved its long-time downtown Jacksonville store operation to a new location on South Jackson Street. A new warehouse and distribution center took shape on the north side of Jacksonville, replacing the warehouse that occupied the rear of the headquarters building. The new operation was opened in 1986.

In 1988, Royce and Ray Beall announced plans to sell Beall's due to the vote of shares by shareholders to sell the company, this effort was led in part by other family members of Jacksonville. The 13% voted against the sale. During the mid- to late 1980s the company was hit particular hard when the oil revenues in the state of Texas plummeted that resulted in a downturn for the state. This forced the company to quit paying dividends thus in turn stockholders became aggressive to sell the company at bargain prices. Operations of Beall's was combined with those of Houston-based Palais Royal (also bought out by Bain, etc. at the same time) and formed a new company, Specialty Retailers, Inc. The combined company would be based in Houston. There were 152 Bealls stores in the chain by this time: Texas had 128, Oklahoma had 11, New Mexico had 10, and there were 3 stores in Alabama. This was a shock to Jacksonville, whose residents and those in the business community considered Bealls to be a good neighbor and corporate citizen. Jacksonville was spared a complete loss, as the new distribution center would stay open, and the credit department of the combined company would be located at the previous Bealls office east of downtown. Also remaining would be the former flagship store of the company, where it still remains, on South Jackson.

By the early-mid 1990s, Specialty Retailers, Inc. would come to encompass another name, Stage Stores. In 2000, Stage Stores filed for Chapter 11 bankruptcy.

Stage Stores operated more than 850 stores in 40 states under the Bealls (no relation to the Bealls chain in Florida), Palais Royal, Peebles, Stage, and Goody's nameplates.

Brands exclusively found at Bealls include Valerie Stevens, Signature Studio, Sun River, Rustic Blue, Rebecca Malone, and Wishful Park.

On May 10, 2020, Stage announced it had filed for Chapter 11 Bankruptcy, and that it would liquidate all locations, Bealls and Gordmans included, unless a buyer could be found for the chain. No buyer had been found, and going out of business sales had begun at all locations.

On October 21, 2020, as part of winding-down its operations, Stage sold its intellectual property, including the national rights to use the Bealls name, to the Florida Bealls for $7 million. Bealls also acquired the rights to the names of Stage's other chains, all of its private label brands and customer lists, and a distribution center in Jacksonville, Texas.
