= Valley Mall =

Valley Mall may refer to:

- Valley Mall (Corner Brook), a shopping mall in Corner Brook, Newfoundland and Labrador (Canada)
- Valley Mall (Hagerstown), a shopping mall in Hagerstown, Maryland, United States
- Valley Mall (Harrisonburg), a shopping mall in Harrisonburg, Virginia, United States
- Valley Mall (Yakima), a shopping mall in Yakima, Washington, United States
