= Valley Mall (Virginia) =

Coordinates: 38°25′41.3″N 78°50′37″W

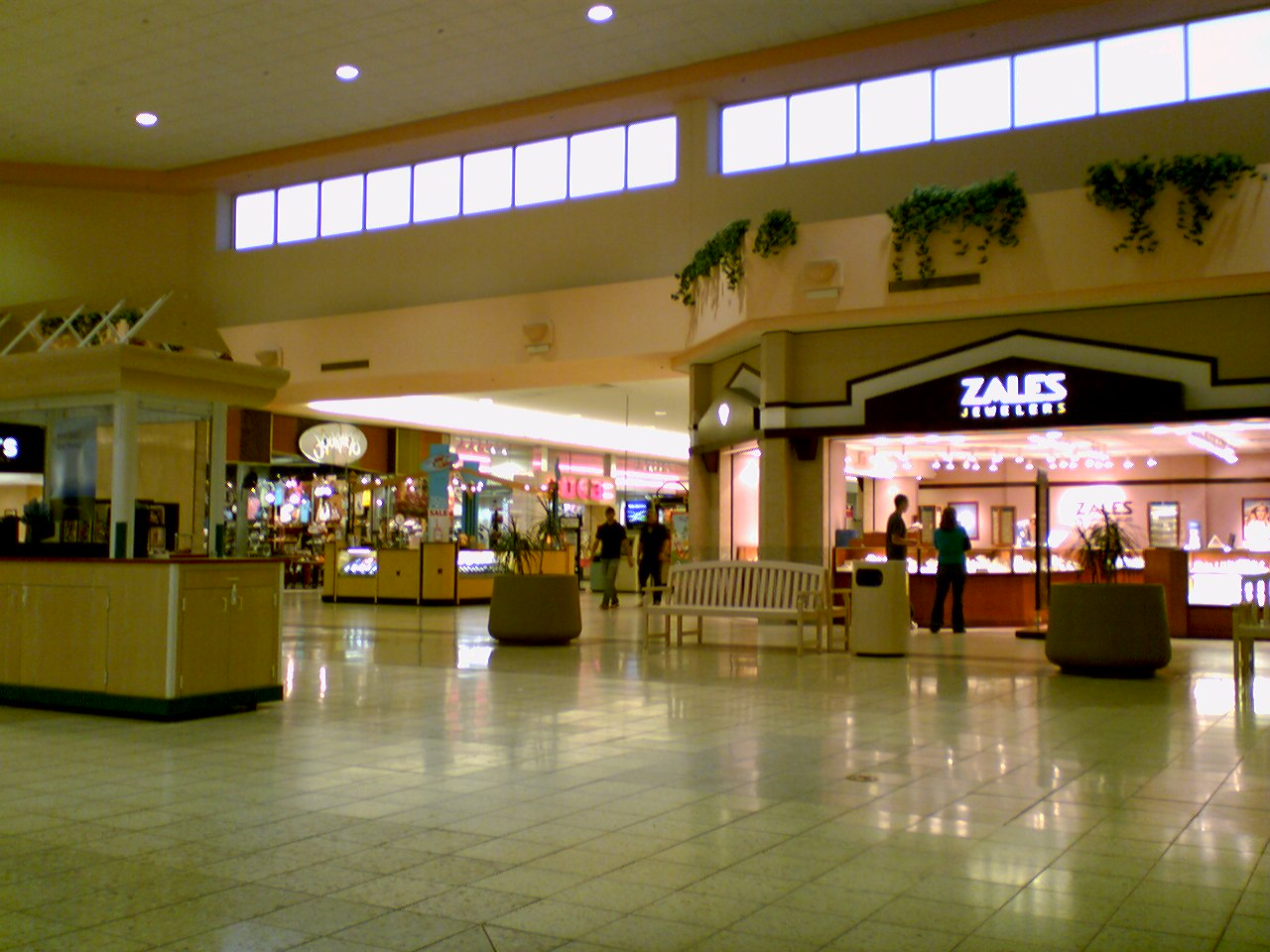
- Area directly in front of the Belk department store, near the mall's eastern end.
- Location: Harrisonburg, Virginia, U.S.
- Address: 1925 East Market Street
- Opened: 1978; 48 years ago
- Developer: General Growth Properties
- Manager: Kohan Retail Investment Group
- Num. of stores: 50+
- Num. of anchor tenants: 4
- Floor area: 505,000 square feet
- Floors: 1
- Website: Official website

Valley Mall is a shopping mall in Harrisonburg, Virginia, owned by Kohan and serving the Shenandoah Valley area of Virginia. It currently features more than 50 stores, with JCPenney, Belk, Dick's Sporting Goods, and Target serving as anchor stores.

== History ==
JCPenney was an original anchor store, along with Watson's (later Peebles), and Leggett (now Belk). A food court, called "Cafe Commons", and a Walmart store were added to the eastern end of the mall in 1991.

In 2003, Walmart's relocation to the new Harrisonburg Crossing shopping center left the Valley Mall with a large amount of vacant space. This space remained vacant through 2003 and 2004. In early 2005, the former Walmart, as well as the food court, were demolished to make way for new retail tenants. Target, Old Navy, and rue21 were constructed on the site in an outdoor format, with the enclosed mall reconfigured to end at the former food court entrance.

A Harrisonburg police officer is assigned to the Valley Mall and another local shopping center. In addition, the mall and some individual stores have their own security personnel.

As is typical with shopping malls in the United States, the busiest time of the year for the Valley Mall is between Thanksgiving and Christmas, with the day after Thanksgiving being particularly busy.

In January 1999, after a controversy about fundraising by charities, the mall allocated a kiosk for charities to use.

The Peebles store, vacated in 2006, became Dick's Sporting Goods in 2012.
