= Almeda Mall =

Shopping mall in Houston, Texas, U.S.

- Location: Genoa, Houston, Texas, United States
- Coordinates: 29°37′24″N 95°13′40″W
- Address: 12200 Gulf Freeway
- Opened: October 10, 1968; 58 years ago
- Developer: The Rouse Company
- Manager: 4th Dimension Properties
- Owner: 4th Dimension Properties
- Architect: Ray Bailey Architects
- Num. of anchor tenants: 4 (1 vacant, 1 under construction, 2 open)
- Floor area: 782,353 sq ft (72,683.0 m^{2})
- Floors: 1 (2 in anchors)
- Website: www.almedamall.com

Almeda Mall is a shopping mall located in the Southeast Houston neighborhood of Genoa on Interstate 45. The mall opened in 1968, two weeks before its sister property, Northwest Mall. The malls were nearly twins of each other. There is one vacant anchor stores formerly occupied by Burlington and one anchor store currently under construction in the former Macy’s that is constructing a new retail development called The Market at Almeda. Junior anchors are dd's DISCOUNTS, and 3.6.5. The mall has 782,353 square feet (72,683.0 m^{2}) in leasable space.

== History ==
The Rouse Company of Baltimore, Maryland founded the subsidiary Almeda Mall, Inc. for the mall's development, beginning construction in the early 1960s on the anchors.

The Foley's anchor store opened first, as a standalone store, on October 3, 1966. Almeda Mall opened two years later, on October 10, 1968, with JCPenney as a second anchor store.

Almeda was the premiere mall for the area southeast of Houston until 1978 when Baybrook Mall opened a few exits south, much closer to the affluent Clear Lake/NASA area, quickly supplanting Almeda.

The mall decline further in the early 2000's, as major retailers began to open in nearby Pearland, including Pearland Town Center in 2008.

In 2006, the mall was about 95% occupied. During that year Glimcher Realty Trust put the mall up for sale, along with the Northwest Mall, which was purchased by WCF Mall Management, but then permanently closed in March 2017. JCPenney closed in 2006 and relocated to Pasadena, TX.

Burlington Coat Factory replaced the former JCPenney as an anchor.

In 2006, Foley's rebranded to Macy's after its acquisition by The May Department Stores Company the previous year.

Around 2017, the mall underwent a million dollar renovation project, replacing the old brown brick flooring and walls.

Palais Royal closed in 2019, eventually being replaced by the store 365, which had been located in the South wing of the mall, near Burlington.

Burlington closed in 2023 to relocate down the street to a neighboring shopping center, called Orange Grove.

On January 9, 2025, it was announced that Macy's would be closing as part of a plan to close 66 stores nationwide. The store closed in March 2025, which left the mall with no traditional anchors.

In late 2025, the former Macy's space at Almeda Mall in Houston began to be redeveloped into The Market at Almeda, a 290,000-square-foot indoor marketplace. The grocery-anchored complex will house a 65,000-square-foot grocery store, a fitness center, restaurants, and a beauty school. Construction on this new development began in 2026.
