= Bainbridge Mall =

Shopping mall in the US state of Georgia

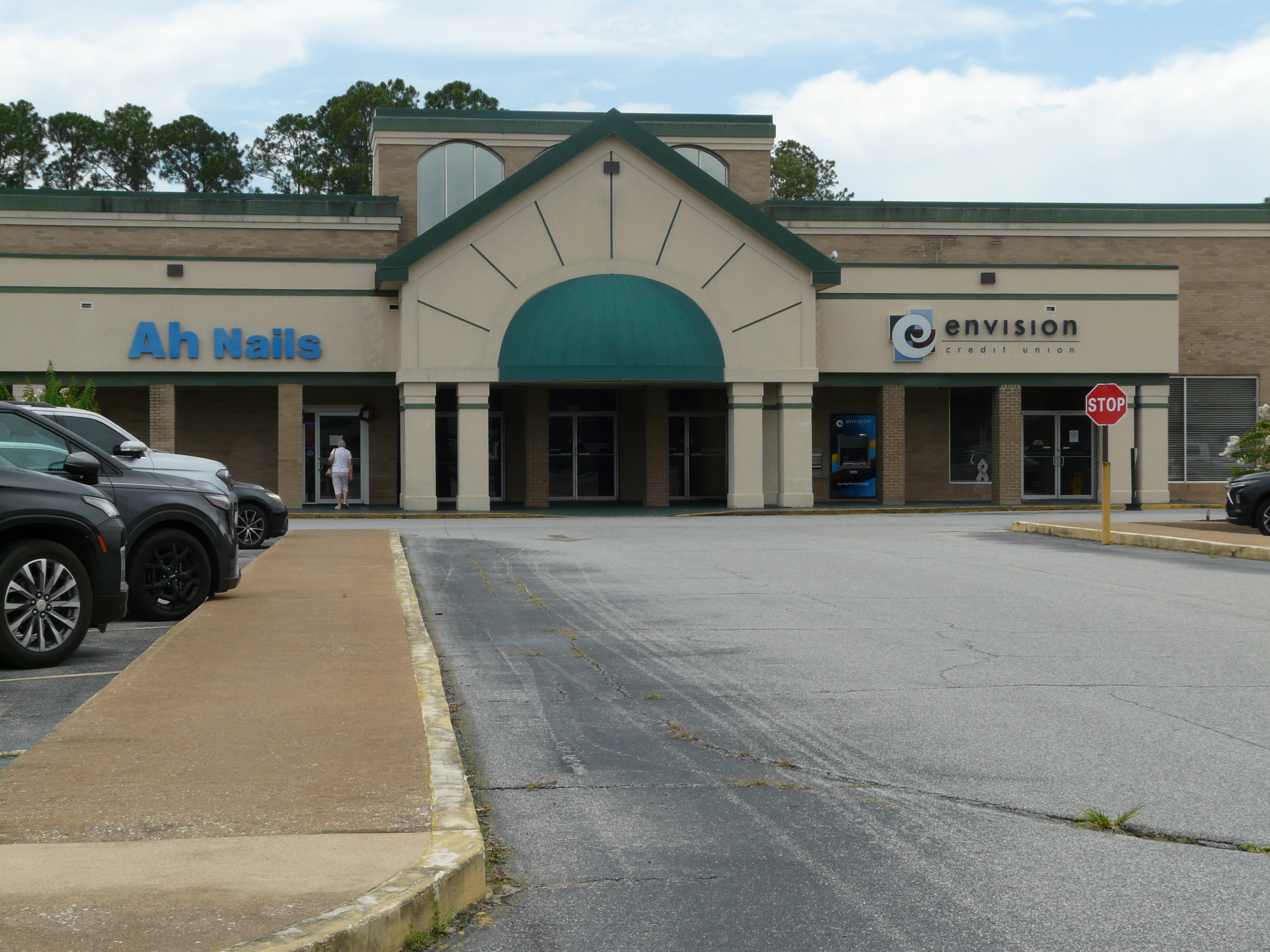
- Main entrance
- Location: Bainbridge, Georgia, United States
- Coordinates: 30°54′11″N 84°33′21″W
- Opened: August 16th, 1973
- Developer: Jim Wilson of Colonial Properties
- Owner: In-Rel Properties
- Num. of anchor tenants: 4 (3 junior anchors)
- Floor area: 143,322 sq ft (13,315.0 m^{2})
- Floors: 1

Bainbridge Mall is a regional shopping mall located in Decatur County, Georgia. The mall is anchored by Belk.

== History ==
Bainbridge Mall was opened with a ribbon cutting ceremony on August 16, 1973, by then governor of Georgia, Jimmy Carter. The mall would be located on the corner of East Shotwell and Wheat Streets, and opened with roughly 140,000 square feet. Opening anchor was Belk-Simpson with junior anchors TG&Y, Elliot Drug, and Piggly Wiggly Supermarket. The total opening store count was 21. The mall was developed by Montgomery-based firm Colonial Properties, headed by Jim Wilson.

The groundbreaking of a triple screen theater adjacent to the mall happened on August 7, 1978. Expected opening date was November of that year.

Goody's, which had been open at the mall since October 1992, would close in 2009 following the company's bankruptcy.

On October 21, 2013, Belk completed a renovation of their 45,000 square foot store, costing a total of $1.2 million. Improvements were made in the fitting rooms, and the overall store layout. Customers commented that the store felt "much larger," although it remained the same size.
