= Signal Hill Mall =

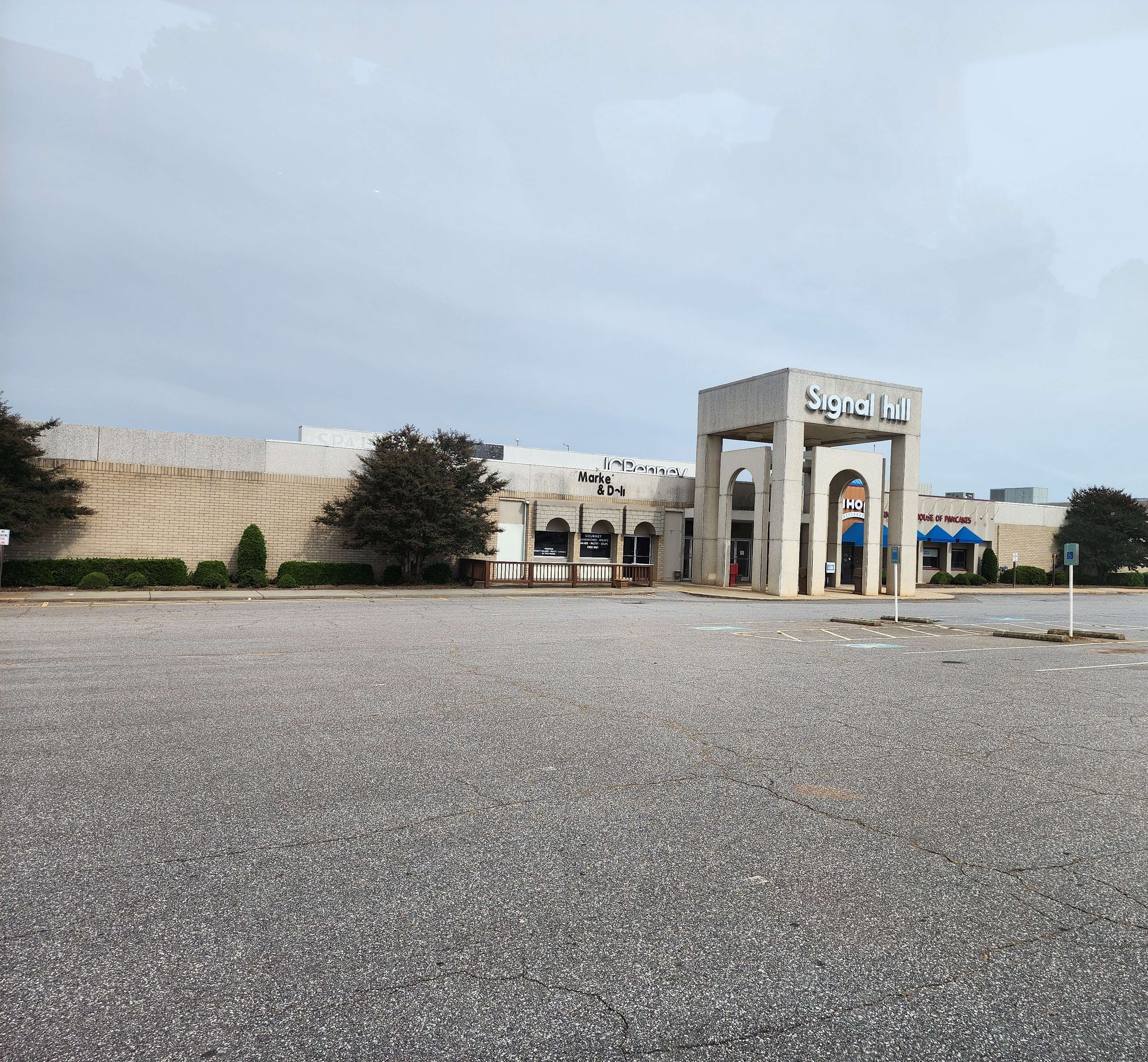
- The entrance of Signal Hill Mall in 2022
- Location: Statesville, North Carolina, United States
- Coordinates: 35.7926°N 80.8575°W
- Address: 1685 E Broad St
- Opened: August 1, 1973; 53 years ago
- Closed: January 2024; 2 years ago
- Developer: C&J Associates
- Manager: C&J Associates
- Owner: C&J Associates
- Num. of stores: 1, 42 at peak
- Num. of anchor tenants: 4 (1 open, 3 vacant)
- Floor area: 309,100 square feet (28,720 m^{2})
- Floors: 1

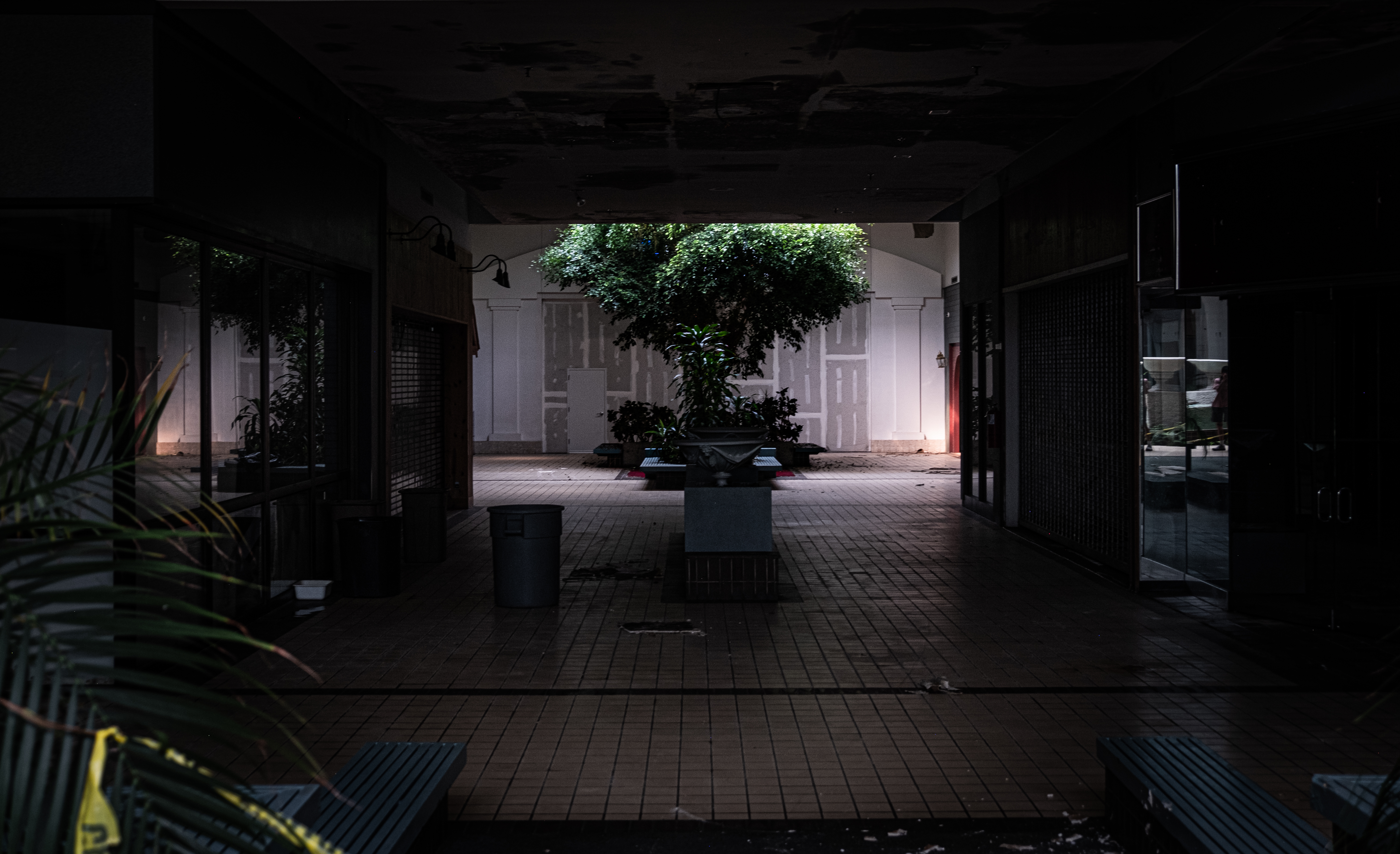
A portion of the Signal Hill Mall's interior in 2023

Signal Hill Mall is a defunct regional enclosed shopping mall located in Statesville, North Carolina, United States. Opened in 1973, it originally featured more than 40 stores, with Woolworth, Belk, and Spainhour's as its original anchor stores. An expansion in 1979 relocated Spainhour's while also adding JCPenney. Spainhour's and Woolworth both closed in the mid-1990s, with Peebles and Hills respectively taking their places; Hills in turn was replaced by Sears soon after. The mall experienced a great deal of decline in the 2010s, losing most of its major stores throughout the decade and receiving significant attention as an example of a dead mall.

== History ==
=== 1970s ===
C&J Associates announced the mall on December 10, 1971, with Woolworth and Belk as the first two anchor stores. The mall would have 275,000 square feet (25,500 m^{2}) of retail space and room for 30 stores. The third original anchor, Spainhour's, was a local department store also operational in downtown at the time. Belk had been operational in the city since 1912.

The mall officially opened for business on August 1, 1973, with Belk, Spainhour's, and Woolworth as anchor tenants. A Winn Dixie grocery store was located just behind the mall.

=== 1980s ===
An expansion of the mall was started in 1979. The existing Spainhour's building was renovated for a new mall wing leading to a relocated, 41,000-square-foot (3,800 m^{2}) Spainhour's as well as an adjacent 51,324-square-foot (4,768.2 m^{2}) JCPenney. The cost of these renovations was stated to be $4,000,000. The new interior space totaled up to 21,000 square feet, and included eight new stores. This brought the total to 42 stores. C&J Associates stated this portion cost $1,000,000. Stores that joined during this period included Endicott Johnson, GNC, Chick-fil-A, Pearle Vision Center, Lerner New York (now known as New York & Company), Record Bar, and Southern Bell Telephone Company; which opened in November 1980. Renovation work concluded with ceremonies on August 6, 1980 for the two anchor stores, and October 15, 1980 for the interior tenants.

=== 1990s ===
The mall underwent a number of internal changes in the 1990s. First was the closure of Spainhour's in late 1992, ending its 50 years of service in Statesville. This was followed in January 1993 by the closure of Woolworth. By year's end, Peebles opened in the former location of Spainhour's. In response to this, the mall owners held a grand opening ceremony with a live band performance from The Muscat Ramblers, a band out of Charlotte, North Carolina. Renovation of the former Spainhour's location for use by Peebles took about six months.

Winn Dixie closed on December 14, 1994. This was a response to the company making a wider move to close smaller stores and open larger ones.

On July 28, 1995, Hills opened in the former location of Woolworth. The 83,000 square feet (7,700 m^{2}) store space cost about $2,000,000 to renovate. This location would be short lived, as Hills closed in April 1997. It was quickly replaced by Sears, which held a grand opening on October 18, 1997. Sears was the most highly requested store by mall patrons, according to manager Burr Collier.

Another major addition to the mall during this timespan was IHOP, which opened in February 1994 in a space at the front of the mall last occupied by the Apple House Buffet. At the time, inline tenants of the mall included Blockbuster Music, Chick-fil-A, Dollar Tree, Footaction, GNC, Armada Music & DVD, and Kay-Bee Toys.

=== 2000s ===
Peebles began a going out of business sale on December 3, 2003 before closing in January 2004. Around this time, management of C&J Associates announced plans for renovation. As part of these plans, some store leases were not renewed.

Chick-fil-A closed on December 31, 2005. Another closure during this time span was Pet Pros pet store, whose owner Bob Barber stated that sales had decreased by 40 percent in the months leading up to the store's closure. A patron in the 2006 article detailing the struggling mall's story stated, "If I'm going to go shopping, I'm going to go to another mall."

=== 2010s ===
Sears closed in 2012 as part of a restructuring plan by the chain to close over 100 stores.

Despite C&J Associates' intentions, a redevelopment project for the mall would never come. The reasoning for this was the state of the economy, as stated by manager Burr Collier in a 2013 article written about the declining property. One stated idea for a redevelopment was turning inline space into big-box stores. Another idea was combining the Signal Hill Mall property with the Newtowne Plaza, which was next to the mall and also built by C&J Associates.

JCPenney closed in 2015 as part of a 40-store round of closures. During the 2010s, Signal Hill Mall received significant media attention as an example of a dead mall. One major closure in 2016 was Bookland bookstore, which had been a tenant since the 1980s. Following their closure and failed attempts at redevelopment, Signal Hill Mall had only 11 stores remaining. Among these were Belk, Saslow Jewelers, IHOP, Bath & Body Works, GNC, RadioShack, and FootAction. Saslow's Jewelers, after almost 20 years of operation, closed its store in October 2017. This was followed by the closure of Radio Shack later in the year.

=== 2020's ===
As of 2022, the mall has continued to decline, with Belk being the only remaining anchor tenant. The Iredell Free News reported that previous attempts at redevelopment had failed due to slow economic growth in the Statesville area; despite this, representatives of C&J Associates noted that industrial development in the area had increased in the intervening years, leading to the possibility of the mall being repurposed for non-retail use. The mall is occasionally used as space for community and recreational events by Statesville residents.

The interior of the mall closed its doors in January 2024. The mall is a potential subject for redevelopment, being referenced in proposed 2025-2026 budget for Statesville.
