= Palais Royal (department store) =

Defunct American chain of department stores

Palais Royal Inc.
- Type: Department store
- Industry: Retail
- Founded: 1921
- Defunct: 2020
- Fate: Bankruptcy
- Headquarters: Houston, Texas
- Products: Apparel, accessories, cosmetics, footwear, and housewares
- Parent: Stage Stores, Inc. (1994-2020) BrandX.com (2022-present)
- Website: Archived official website at the Wayback Machine (archive index)

Palais Royal was an American chain of department stores, owned by Stage Stores, Inc. and headquartered in Houston, Texas, that specialized in retailing brand name apparel, accessories, cosmetics, footwear, and housewares.

Brands exclusively found at Palais Royal included Valerie Stevens, Signature Studio, Sun River, Rustic Blue, Rebecca Malone, Wishful Park.

== History ==
Palais Royal originated in 1921 in Downtown Houston, at 620 Main Street, as a small one room shop owned by Milton Levy. Two years later, a larger space was needed, and the store relocated to the corner of Main and Capital. Milton Levy passed away that same year. Isadore Erlich moved to Houston from Dallas in 1937 and purchased a controlling interest, and became president of Palais Royal.

== Flagship store ==
The flagship store in Downtown Houston was relocated several times again; in 1928 to 700–6 Main at the Bankers Mortgage Building, now called the Great Jones Building, where it would remain for a quarter century.

When next-door competitor Sakowitz department store moved to a new flagship building at 11th and Main, Palais Royal moved into its rival's old quarters at the next-door landmark Gulf Building, 708 Main Street, in 1953.

In 1969, when Neiman Marcus moved its Houston store from 614 Main (Kirby Lofts) to what would become The Galleria, the Downtown Palais made its final move taking over Neiman's old quarters, where it would stay for another three decades until permanently closing in 2000.

== Expansion ==
As their sales and popularity continued to grow, Palais Royal began an expansion; and opened their first branch location in the Rice Village area of Houston in 1950. This was followed with the first location outside of the Houston city limits, in suburban Pasadena, Texas in 1952.

1955 brought additional branch stores to the northwestern Spring Branch, Houston neighborhood; and also to the Meyerland, Houston area. The Oak Forest area of Houston gained their own local branch in 1960.

By 1960, Palais Royal had successfully expanded and grown into a company with six stores in the Houston area, and one store in Shreveport, Louisiana. In addition to the Palais Royal stores, Palais Royal also operated two stores under the Worth's name in Beaumont, Texas, and one Worth's store in Orange, Texas.

Upon Erlich's death in 1968, Palais Royal was still expanding, and Erlich had announced plans to construct three more stores. His surviving widow, Moselle Erlich (Pollack), took over the presidency of Palais Royal. She was elected chairman in 1979, and relinquished her former post to Bernard Fuchs.

Bernard Fuchs was responsible for overseeing Palais Royal during their greatest period of growth, including the $300 million purchase of the 152 store Bealls (Texas-based department store) chain. The combined company was renamed Specialty Retailers. The continued success of Specialty Retailers allowed them to purchase the Fashion Bar/Stage chain of 76 stores in 1992. In 1994 the name of the company was changed to Stage Stores.

The stores were bought by Wellan's of Alexandria, Louisiana in 1985.

In 2019, it was announced that parent company Stage Stores Inc planned to convert all Palais Royal stores to the Gordmans banner, along with Stage Stores' other chains.

On May 10, 2020, Stage announced it had filed for Chapter 11 Bankruptcy, and that it would liquidate all locations, Palais Royal and Gordmans included, unless a buyer could be found for the chain. No buyer had been found, and going out of business sales had begun at all locations. By September 2020, all stores were closed.
