= Kirby Lofts =

- Interactive map of the Kirby Lofts area
- Former names: The Fashion, Neiman Marcus-Houston, Palais Royal
- Alternative names: Kirby Building

General information
- Location: 917 Main Street, Houston, Texas
- Coordinates: 29°45′26″N 95°21′52″W
- Opened: 1926

Design and construction
- Architect: Alfred C. Finn

The Kirby Lofts is an 11-story building at 917 Main Street in Downtown Houston, Texas, currently consisting of apartments with retail on the ground floor, originally built in 1926 and designed by Alfred C. Finn, a noted Houston-based architect.

== History ==
=== The Fashion, Kirby offices and theater ===
Finn designed the building in 1926 for lumber barton John Henry Kirby to house the Kirby Theater (cinema), and offices in the upper floors.

Retailer Ben Wolfman moved The Fashion, his upscale department store for women's apparel and accessories, to the Kirby building. Wolfman had already established himself as a well-known retailer in Houston: prior to 1919, he was a partner in the men's shoe store Wolfman-Rauch at 614 Main Street. In 1919, he converted it to an upscale women's store, The Fashion. The Fashion gradually expanded into the upper floors of 917 Main until occupying most of it.

In 1947, Wolfman carried out a $2 million renovation, with "swanky" interiors and a modern limestone façade, now hidden behind a layer of mirrored glass added later. Finn also designed the renovation alongside New York architect Peter Gray.

=== Neiman Marcus ===
In 1955 Neiman Marcus and Ben Wolfman, Inc. merged, and the store became a branch store – the first ever – of Neiman Marcus.

=== Palais Royal ===
Neiman Marcus moved its Houston store to The Galleria in 1969. 917 Main then became the downtown flagship of Houston-based department store chain Palais Royal.

In 2000 owner Stage Stores closed the Palais Royal Downtown Houston store along with many other branches as part of its bankruptcy restructuring.

=== Kirby Lofts ===
In 2004, the building was converted to its current function – residential with ground floor retail.
