= Wellan's =

Wellan's Department Store
- Company type: Department Store
- Industry: Retail
- Founded: 1904
- Defunct: 1989
- Fate: Bought out by Beall-Ladymon, then later Stage Department Stores
- Headquarters: Alexandria, Louisiana
- Products: Clothing, toys, furniture

Wellan's is a defunct chain of American department store formerly headquartered in Alexandria, Louisiana.

== History ==
=== Beginnings ===
Wellan's Department Store started as a small store on Second Street in Alexandria and was founded by Louis Wellan. It had many items for sale such as dresses, menswear, and some toys and furniture. It coined itself as a new family-oriented store in central Louisiana, and conducted business in just that manner. In 1924, it moved to what would become its landmark location on Third Street. It served the city and region, and became known for its famous Christmas displays in December. For the month of December, the store would decorate its windows and its facade with dazzling lights.

The company then went on an outward expedition and moved into the Alexandria Mall. The company took over Palais Royal stores of Shreveport and acquired both Palais Royal Department Stores and The Depot Stores department stores. The company then established a "modern" store in Monroe, before being purchased by Stage Stores, Inc., in 1997.

The main building was demolished to make way for the Coughlin Saunders Performing Arts Center.

=== Modern Name Use ===
Stage Dept. Stores uses the name Palais Royal itself to brand some of its own stores.
