= Watson's (United States) =

Ira A. Watson Co.
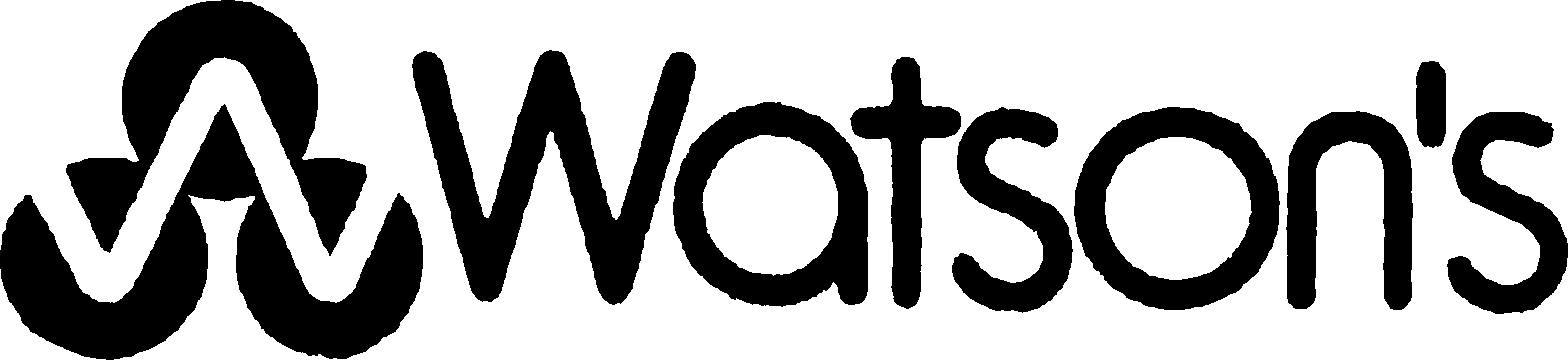
- Company type: Private
- Industry: Retail
- Founded: 1907; 119 years ago
- Defunct: 1998; 28 years ago
- Fate: Bought out by Peebles
- Successor: Peebles
- Headquarters: Knoxville, Tennessee, United States
- Products: apparel, home furnishings

Ira A. Watson Co., more commonly known as Watson's was a department store chain based in Knoxville, Tennessee, United States. It was founded in 1907 and grew to many locations throughout the Southeastern United States. The company was purchased for $4.45 million (~$7.97 million in 2024) by Peebles with the transaction closing June 29, 1998.

== History ==
Expanding from the original operation, the company opened a group of downtown stores in county seat towns. As shopping centers and malls developed, Watson's opened substantially larger stores in those locations. Operations grew from a single location in Knoxville, Tennessee, to numerous locations in Alabama, Kentucky, Tennessee, Virginia, West Virginia, South Carolina, North Carolina, Missouri, Indiana, and Illinois. The merchandise was purchased and distributed to all of the Watson's stores from the centralized warehouse located at the corporate offices in Knoxville.

The company hit hard times in the late 1980s and eventually filed for Chapter 11 Bankruptcy in February 1992 when they were unable to renew bank financing. At the time of the filing, the company operated 31 stores in nine states. The courts approved a reorganization plan for the company to emerge from Chapter 11 in 6 years. Profitability improved and Watson's emerged from Chapter 11 in about half of the anticipated time though the company never fully recovered. Through a series of ineffective upper management hires in the early to late 1990s, the company continued its downward spiral. In the end, the company that prospered by selling goods in remote areas of the southeast where competitors were few, could not compete with the new Walmart and Goodys Family Clothing stores as these companies began to build in markets that were once considered too small. Watson's business model was viable no longer.

Watson's was purchased in June 1998 by Peebles, a then privately held retailer based in South Hill, Virginia. At that time, Watson's became a wholly owned subsidiary of Peebles. All Watson's stores were converted to Peebles a year later. The former Watson's Knoxville Distribution Center at 200 Hayfield Road is now the location of Jewelry Television (JTV). Peebles was purchased by Houston, Texas-based Specialty Retailers in 2003.It is now part of the Gordman's chain.
