= Bealls (Florida-based department store) =

United States retail corporation

Bealls Inc.
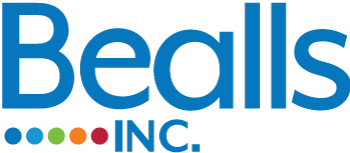

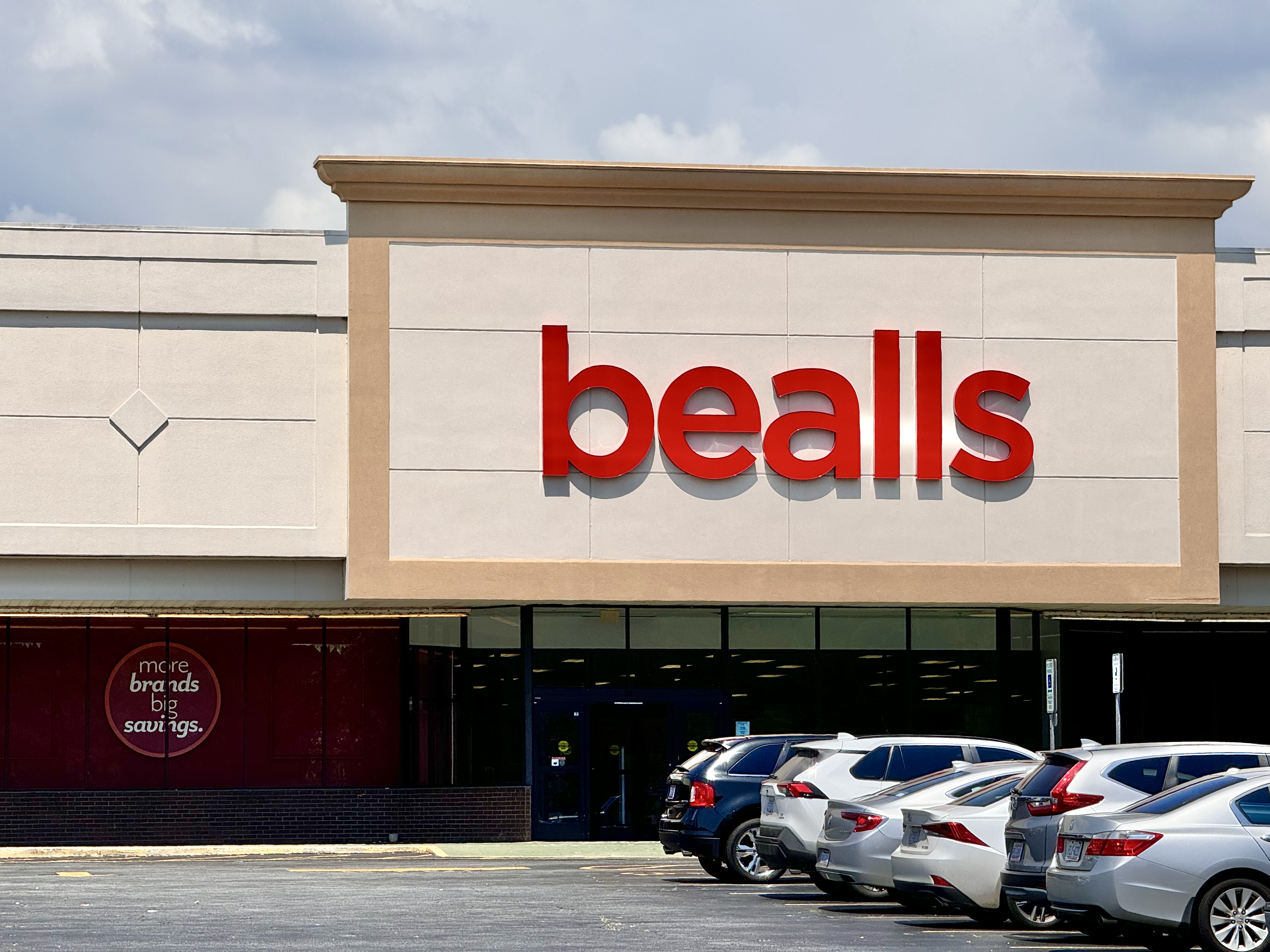
- A Bealls store in Murphy, North Carolina
- Formerly: Dollar Limit (1915–1920); V-Dollar Limit (1920–1940); Beall’s Department Store (1940–2023); Burkes (1998–2023)
- Type: Private
- Industry: Retail
- Founded: 1915 (111 years ago)
- Founder: Robert M. Beall
- Headquarters: Bradenton, Florida
- Number of locations: 650
- Key people: Matt Beall (CEO)
- Products: Apparel, footwear, accessories, jewelry, home goods, luggage, toys, food and housewares
- Revenue: US$3 billion (2022)
- Owner: Beall family
- Number of employees: 14,000 (2022)
- Divisions: bealls; Bealls Florida; Home Centric; Rugged Earth Outfitters
- Website: beallsinc.com

Bealls, Inc. (/ˈbɛlz/) is a Florida-based retail corporation with headquarters located in Bradenton, Florida since 1915.

Bealls Florida was not affiliated with the Texas-based Bealls chain (formerly owned by Stage Stores), although the two brands overlapped in some markets with Bealls Outlet using the name Burkes Outlet where they overlapped. In 2020, Bealls bought Stage Stores intellectual property and acquired the rights to the Bealls name nationwide. They also acquired the rights to all of Stage's different chains, private labels, customer lists and a distribution center in Jacksonville, Texas. In 2022 they sold the rights to the Stage Stores chains (excluding Bealls) to BrandX.

As of 2026, Bealls Inc. operates more than 650 stores under the names of Bealls, Bealls Florida, and Home Centric.

== History ==
In 1915, 22-year-old Robert M. Beall, Sr. opened a dry goods store in Bradenton, Florida called "Dollar Limit"; he invested his entire savings in merchandise and empty wooden packing crates were used as the display tables.

In 1920 the store was renamed to V-Dollar Limit Store as the maximum price went up to five dollars. Business prospered during the Florida land boom of the 1920s and in a few years Beall had purchased a vacant lot and built a new modern department store which opened in Christmas of 1924.

The Florida boom ended in a few years, only to be followed by the stock market crash. Hard hit and unable to pay his debts, Robert Beall lost his business to the bank. He stayed on as manager through the depression. In 1944 after paying off his debts he managed to repurchase the company.

=== Bealls Stores ===
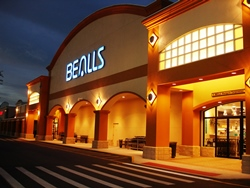
Bealls (Florida) store in 2007.

In 1946, Robert was joined by his son E.R. as junior partner. They christened the business Bealls Department Store. Air conditioning and an influx of new residents in the 1950s began to transform the face of Florida.

In 1957, the second Bealls Department store was opened in Bradenton's Westgate Shopping Center and a third store followed in 1961 at the Venice Shopping Center in Venice, Florida. E.R. developed the new chain while his father ran the original downtown store until just prior to his death in 1979.

During the 1960s and 1970s Florida experienced amazing growth and Bealls stores grew with it. In 1980, Robert M. Beall II became president of the corporation—the third generation. E.R. became chairman of the board. By 1981 the chain had 23 stores. A year later, seven new stores enabled the chain to double its selling space. Bealls continued to grow into new communities and adopt new technologies, introducing in-store kiosks and launching their website in 1998. Bealls' growth philosophy was to self-finance; staying within the limits of its operating cash, and keeping its debt load low. To customize its product line, Bealls opened its own design studio in 2004.

In 2023, it was announced that Bealls would be rebranded to bealls nationwide, and all Bealls stores in Florida would be renamed as Bealls Florida.

Bealls Outlet logo

== Bealls (formerly Bealls Outlet) ==
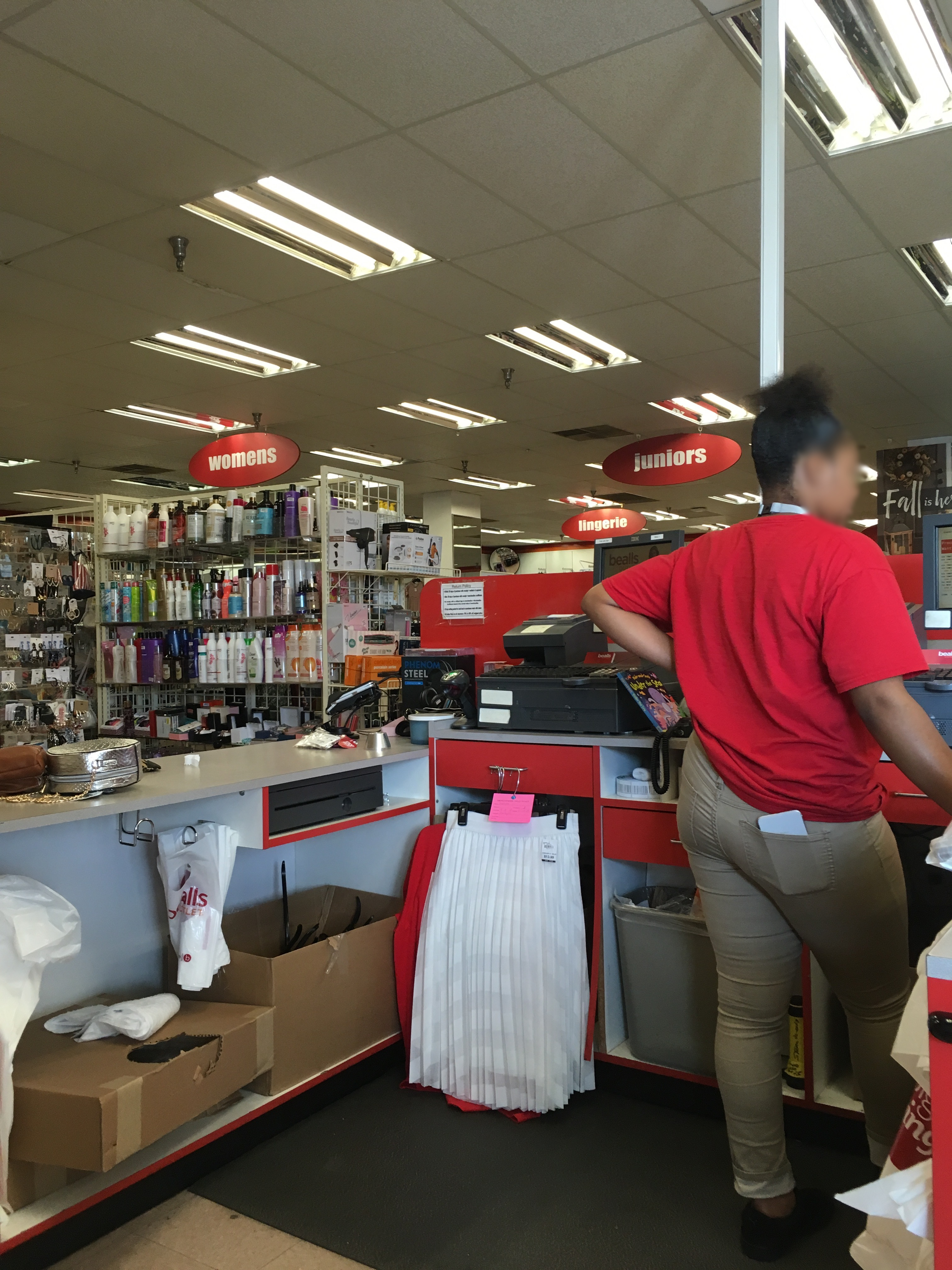
The interior of a Bealls Outlet in Seffner, Florida.

E.R. Beall having observed the growth of outlet stores in North Carolina, Bealls ventured into the off-price channel in 1987. After a few hits and misses, Bealls Outlet caught on rapidly. In 1992, Bealls opened its first out-of-Florida Outlet in Arizona, and soon expanded to Georgia. Now Bealls Outlet operates in many different states under the names Bealls Outlet & Burkes Outlet.

In April 2023, it was announced that Bealls Outlet & Burkes Outlet would both be rebranded to "bealls" and that Bealls (in Florida) would be renamed to Bealls Florida.

== Home Centric ==
The Home Centric brand of stores began as a store within a store test concept in select Burkes Outlet and Bealls Outlet stores. The first stand-alone Home Centric store opened in May 2018 in Cary, NC focusing on discount home furnishings and home decor. Home Centric is dedicated to bringing its customers "inspired living for less" maintaining the focus on discounted pricing established by the Burkes Outlet and Bealls Outlet brands.

== Community ==
Following the sale of the old downtown store, the proceeds were used to establish a charitable foundation named for the founder. Since then the foundation has provided scholarships to over 600 employees and their dependents. Bealls is a longtime contributor to the United Way and to agencies that help young people and education. In celebration of its centennial year, company outreach assisted Habitat for Humanity and the American Cancer Society; Bealls also sponsors Take Stock in Children, helping to mentor at-risk children throughout Florida.
