= Goody's (store) =

Former American retail chain

Goody's Family Clothing Inc.
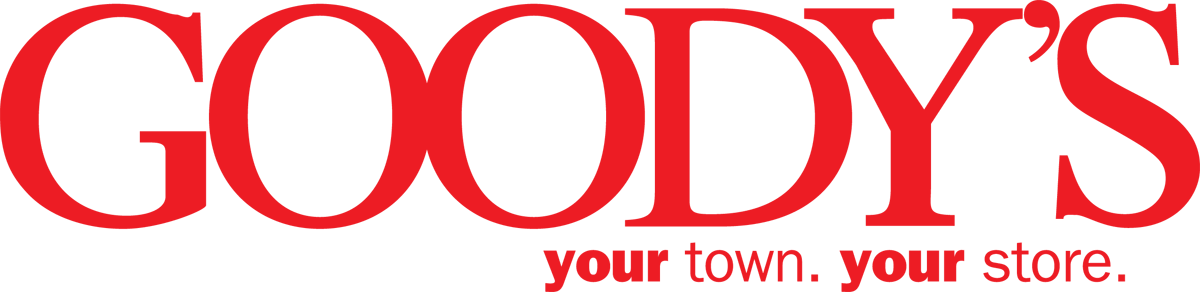
- Trade name: Goody's
- Type: Department store
- Industry: Clothing
- Founded: 1953 (original), 2009 (revival)
- Founder: M.D. Goodfriend
- Defunct: 2009 (original), 2020 (revival)
- Fate: Filed for bankruptcy and liquidated
- Headquarters: Houston, Texas
- Area served: Southern United States; Midwestern United States
- Products: Apparel, accessories, cosmetics, footwear, and housewares
- Parent: Stage Stores (2009-2020) BrandX.com (2022-present)
- Website: Archived official website at the Wayback Machine (archive index)

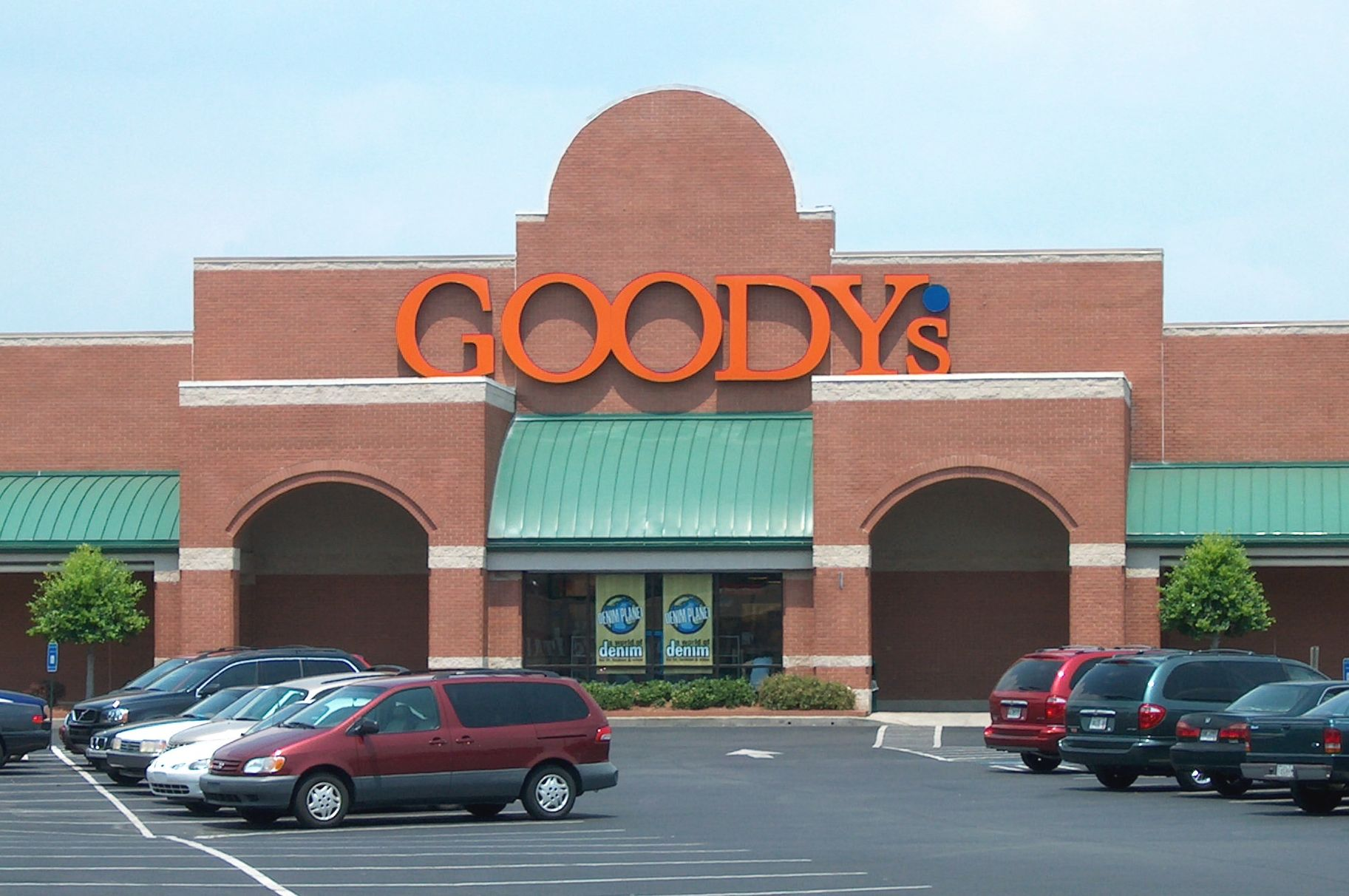
A former Goody's location in Georgia

Goody's Family Clothing Inc. was an American chain of department stores, owned and operated by Stage Stores and headquartered in Houston, TX. It specialized in retailing on-trend apparel, accessories, cosmetics, footwear, and housewares.

It was a successor to a chain of clothing retailers that was based in Knoxville, Tennessee. At one time Goody's operated close to 500 stores in the U.S South and Midwest, including Alabama, Arkansas, Florida, Georgia, Illinois, Indiana, Iowa, Kansas, Kentucky, Louisiana, Maryland, Mississippi, Missouri, North Carolina, Oklahoma, Ohio, South Carolina, Tennessee, Texas, Virginia, and West Virginia. In late 2010, Goody's opened 17 new stores in the Southeast.

Brands exclusively found at Goody's include Valerie Stevens; Signature Studio; Sun River; Rustic Blue; Rebecca Malone; and Wishful Park.

== History ==
Goody's was founded in 1953 in Athens, Tennessee, by M. D. Goodfriend as an offshoot of a family retail business, The M. Goodfriend Store, that the founder's father, Mike Goodfriend, had started in Athens in 1913. The new store, Athens Outlet Store, focused on the sale of closeout, irregular, and previous-year merchandise. The business grew, operating 20 stores by 1970.

In 1978, the name was changed to "Goody's". "Goody" was the college nickname of M. D. Goodfriend's son Bob, who had joined the family business in 1972. In 1979, Bob Goodfriend became president of the business and the company changed its merchandise focus from the outlet model to offering current, first-quality, brand-name merchandise. With this new strategic direction, the chain expanded rapidly. A private-label clothing line was launched in 1993. By 1998, the chain recorded $1 billion in annual sales, and in 2000 it opened its 300th store. By 2004, there were more than 350 stores recording annual sales of $1.3 billion.

In 2006 Goody's became a privately held company again when it was acquired by GMM Capital and Prentice Capital Management in January 2006. Sales in 2006 totaled $1.6 billion. In 2008 Goody's filed for Chapter 11 bankruptcy and announced it was to close 69 stores. While Goody's successfully left Chapter 11 bankruptcy, it was announced four months later in early January 2009 that Goody's had filed for Chapter 7 bankruptcy and planned to liquidate all of their stores. Following the liquidation of the stores, the Goody's trademark was acquired by Houston-based Specialty Retailers (later renamed to Stage Stores) in July 2009, with plans to reopen stores starting later that year.

In September 2019 it was announced that Goody's, along with all other stores operated by Stage Stores Inc, would be converted to Gordmans stores by the end of 2020.

On May 10, 2020, Stage announced it had filed for Chapter 11 Bankruptcy, and that it would liquidate all locations, Goody's and Gordmans included, unless a buyer could be found for the chain. No buyer had been found, and going out of business sales had begun at all locations.

In 2022 BrandX bought the Goody's brand for an undisclosed amount, with intentions of re-establishing it in 2022.
