= Same-store sales =

Difference in revenue by a retail chain's established outlets

Same-store sales is a business term that refers to the difference in revenue generated by a retail chain's existing outlets over a certain period (often a fiscal quarter or a particular shopping season), compared to an identical period in the past, usually in the previous year. By comparing sales data from existing outlets - that is, by excluding new outlets or outlets which have since closed - the comparison is like-to-like, and avoids comparing fundamentally incomparable data. This financial and operational metric is expressed as a percentage.

Same-store sales are also known as comparable store sales, identical store sales or like-store sales.

Same-store sales are widely reported by publicly owned retail chains as a key element of their operational results. For chains that are growing quickly by opening new outlets, same-store sales figures allow analysts to differentiate between revenue growth that comes from new stores and growth from improved operations at existing outlets.

By comparing how well existing outlets perform during a particular week compared to that same week in the previous year, business trends can be measured more accurately. Seasonal and geographical variations are removed from the measurement: instead of collecting an average over periods and location, annual changes in performance are revealed.

Growing same-store sales can be explained by several reasons, including market share gains in a retailer's trade areas; higher average purchases and/or more frequent customer visits ("foot traffic"); and successfully cross-selling into a broader product range or upselling to more expensive ones.

Sustained negative same-store sales are a sure telltale that a retailer is in trouble. As large retail chains expand geographically they eventually run out of prime locations and often end up cannibalizing their existing stores to some extent, which leads to a relative decline in this metric. A rapid expansion in the number of stores followed a few years later by weak same-store sales numbers shows (in hindsight) that the store additions might have been careless or rushed.

Specific store sales can also be compared. For example, a retail chain's finding that its same-store sales at location A for the week-long shopping rush before Christmas are greater than those at location B is a useful piece of data. That data would have been less useful if only chain-wide sales for that week were known (with all stores averaged together), or if only year-long sales were known for that particular store. This makes same-store sales a useful metric not only for external assessments of a retailer's performance but also for internal benchmarking guiding store opening, remodeling, and closing decisions.

While the consensus "favours" this method of accounting, the Institute of Chartered Accountants in England and Wales in 2013 cautioned against using it as "unreliable", especially "as calculations may change one year to next in same company."

== Calculating Comp Store Growth ==
There are numerous approaches to calculating comp store sales growth with most of these falling into two broad methodologies:

1. Comp Growth is based only on stores that satisfy comp criteria
2. Comp Growth is based only on store periods that satisfy comp criteria

The criteria used to include or exclude stores from comp growth are also widely varied and often driven by the convenience and availability of data.

- Comp-store growth reporting to the market is often generated by commercial roles having a strong connection to fiscal periods. This tends to drive comp criteria where store sales are assessed in monthly buckets.
- Retail operations, however, tend to manage in weekly time buckets that correspond to consumer shopping cycles. Operational reporting thus tends to use comp criteria where store sales are assessed in weekly buckets.
- With most retail trade subject to seasonal cycles, most comp growth sales look at year-on-year (YOY) comparisons
- Comp Growth can also be considered for different time periods such as
  - Week
  - Month-on-Month
  - Half-to-Date (HTD)
  - Year-to-Date (YTD)

=== Method 1 - Stores Satisfying Comp Criteria ===
This methodology looks at a store's trading history and if the store has a sufficient history to satisfy the current and prior comparative period (PCP), then the store is flagged as a comp store. Trading results are then filtered for comp stores only and then measures such as Comp Sales Growth, Comp Profit Growth, etc. can be evaluated. Mathematically the length of trading history required to satisfy comp criteria will vary depending on the type of period being reported as per the following examples:

- Month-on-Month requires 13 months of trading results to qualify as a comp store
- Year-to-Date requires current and full prior year trading results to qualify as a comp store

For simplicity, some organizations simply classify stores as comp only after they have had two full years of trading. The downside of this approach is that a store could be excluded even though there are relevant YOY results that could provide insight.

=== Method 2 - Store Periods Satisfying Comp Criteria ===
This methodology considers individual store periods (such as weeks or months) and classifies these as either comp or non-comp. For example, assume we are in week 12 of the retail year and a store opened in week 5 of the prior retail year.

- in a week-on-week report, the comp store growth would look at week 12 of the current year vs week 12 of the prior year
- in a year-to-date report, the comp store growth would look at weeks 5 to 12 of the current year vs weeks 5 to 12 of the prior year
- in year-on-year reporting, once the current year has been completed, the comp store growth would look at weeks 5 to 52 of the current year vs weeks 5 to 52 of the prior year. This demonstrates the key difference between Method 1 and Method 2 since method one would have excluded all data for this store since the store did not fully satisfy comp criteria. Method 2 only excludes non-comp periods resulting in a richer data set being used for comp growth measures.
