= Stage Stores =

American retail company

Stage Stores, Inc. Specialty Retailers, Inc.
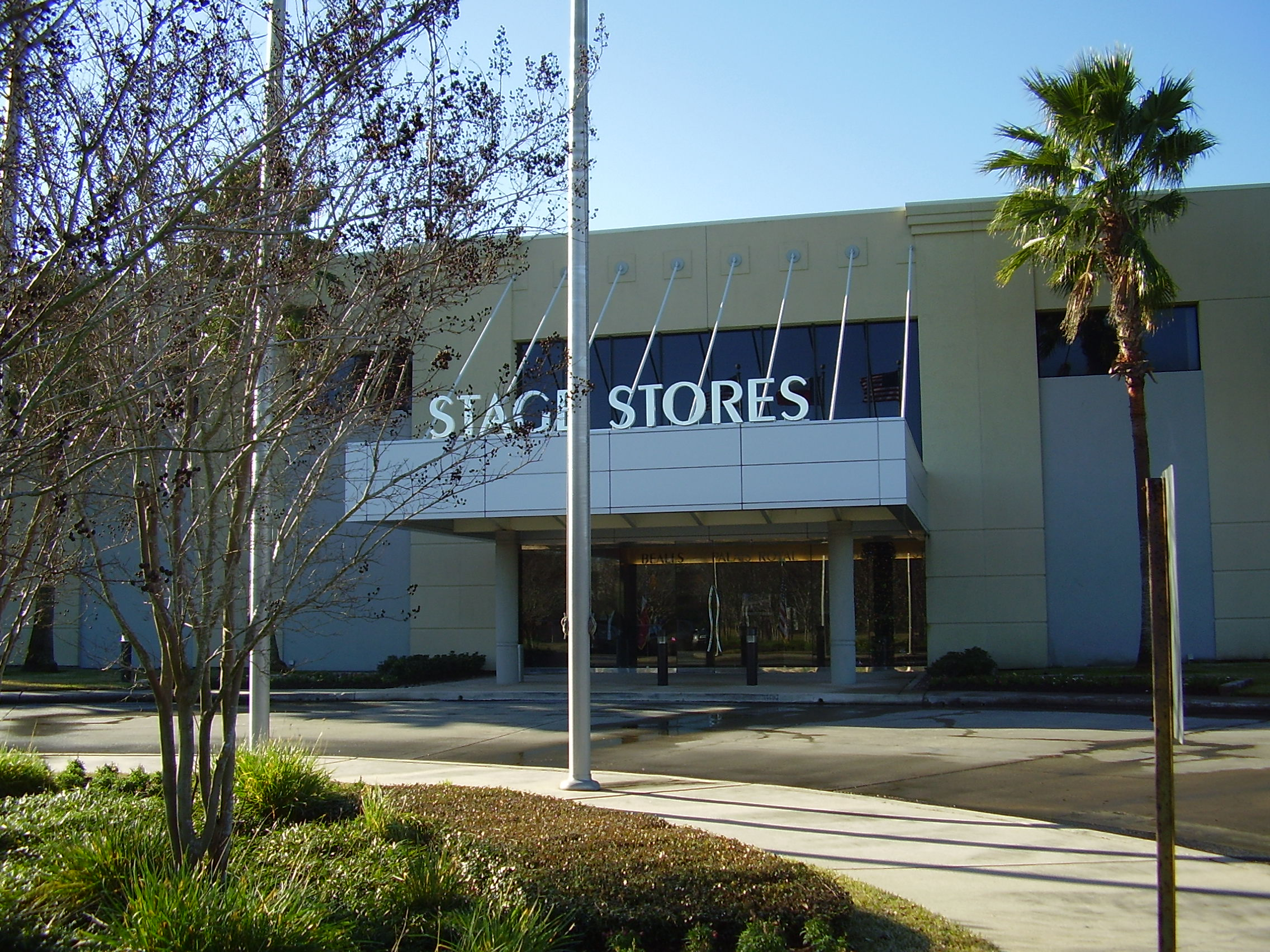

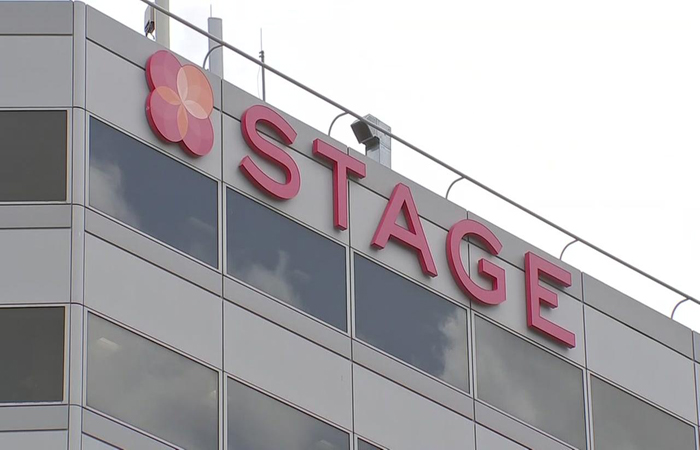
- Stage Stores, Inc. Corporate Office
- Industry: Retail
- Founded: 1988; 38 years ago
- Fate: Chapter 11 bankruptcy And Liquidation
- Headquarters: Houston, Texas
- Number of locations: 786 (2019)
- Key people: William J. Montgoris (non-executive chairman); Michael L. Glazer (president, CEO); Steve Williams (CIO)
- Products: Apparel, Accessories, Cosmetics, Footwear, and Housewares
- Revenue: ▼US$1.64 billion (2019)
- Net income: ▼US$−87.9 million (2019)
- Total assets: ▼US$794.25 million (2019)
- Total equity: ▼US$254.53 million (2019)
- Number of employees: 13,600 (Feb. 2019)
- Parent: BrandX.com (2022-present)
- Website: Archived official website at the Wayback Machine (archive index)

Stage Stores, Inc. was a department store company specializing in retailing off-price brand name apparel, accessories, cosmetics, footwear, and housewares throughout the United States. Stores were usually located in shopping malls and centers or in standalone locations. The corporate office was located in Houston, Texas.

Stage Stores operated 782 department stores in 42 states, almost all of which were eventually converted to their flagship brand, Gordmans, which it acquired in 2017. Historically, Stage Stores operated full-price retail outlets under the Bealls, Palais Royal, Peebles, Stage, and Goody's nameplates before transitioning away from that business model and toward an off-price positioning in 2019 and 2020.

On May 11, 2020, Stage Stores announced it had filed for Chapter 11 bankruptcy after failing to find a buyer for the chain. The company had suffered poor sales in the 2019 holiday season, and after the onset of the COVID-19 pandemic and the ensuing retail shutdowns that began in March 2020, Stage Stores was unable to secure financing that would allow the continued operation of the chain. The company said that it would begin inventory liquidation sales at stores as soon as they could reopen.

Exclusive brands of the company included Valerie Stevens, Signature Studio, Sun River, Rustic Blue, Rebecca Malone, and Wishful Park.

== Chains ==
- Stage Stores: South Central-based (department store)
- Bealls: Texas-based (department store, founded 1923) (previously owned)
- Palais Royal: Texas-based (department store, founded 1921)
- Peebles: Eastern and upper midwestern areas of US. (department store, founded 1891)
- Gordmans: Midwestern-based (off-price department store, founded 1915)
- Goody's: Southeastern-based (department store, founded 1953)

== History ==
Through a series of acquisitions the company grew to 793 stores as of July 29, 2017.

In June 1992, Stage Stores, then known as Specialty Retailers, Inc. (SRI), acquired Colorado-based Fashion Bar, Inc., a family-owned business with 71 stores, most of which were comparable to Palais Royal and Bealls. The remainder were small specialty stores known as Stage Stores, which had already become part of SRI's operation.

In 1996, SRI completed the closure of the other Fashion Bar Stores but retained the Stage name. The company purchased the forty-nine stores of Beall-Ladymon, Inc., sold by company president Horace Ladymon. The outlets were located in Arkansas, Kansas, Louisiana, and Mississippi; they were reopened in 1994 under the "Stage" name.

Stage expanded into the Northwest with the acquisition in 1997 of C. R. Anthony Co. and Tri-North stores.

The company acquired Uhlmans in 1996, which brought Stage to Michigan, Illinois, and Indiana. All of these newly acquired stores, however, were closed by 2001 when Stage Stores filed for Chapter 11 bankruptcy. Closures as part of the bankruptcy included most of the former Fashion Bar, Milliken's, Tri-North, and Uhlman's stores, as well as an exodus from Wisconsin, Michigan, and Minnesota.

In 2003, Stage Stores acquired 136 Peebles stores located in 17 states.

The company purchased the Goody's name through the Goody's bankruptcy auction in 2009. The nameplate was used in markets with a strong customer awareness and brand recognition of the name.

In 2011, Stage Stores began a new chain called Steele's, but in March 2014 it was announced that these stores are being sold to Hilco Global.

Stage Stores acquired the Gordmans' assets in March 2017 after becoming the winning bidder in a bankruptcy sale. The company announced that it planned to run at least 50 stores and one of Gordmans’ distribution centers. Under the direction of Stage Stores, Gordmans began to transition away from the specialty department store business model, moving the brand to the off-price retail sector, more resembling stores like T.J. Maxx, Ross, and Burlington. As part of expanding the brand, Stage Stores opening their first new Gordmans store in Rosenberg, Texas in March, 2018.

In March, 2019, Stage announced that by mid-2020 they planned to convert at least 220 of their current department stores, including those of other brand names, into Gordmans off-price stores. CEO Michael Glazer cited the high sales increases in the locations that were converted in 2018 as the deciding factor in the decision. In September, 2019, Stage Stores announced that they planned to completely exit the department store market, moving completely to the off-price model, converting all other stores brands to the Gordmans brand, and operating approximately 700 Gordmans stores by the third quarter of fiscal 2020 (August-October).

In May 2020, Stage Stores filed for Chapter 11 bankruptcy, even though the ongoing conversions had resulted in same-store sales rising more than 17% in the November-January fiscal quarter.

== Acquisitions ==
Stage Stores, Inc. has acquired many stores over the years, including the following:

- Fashion Bar (Colorado, Wyoming). Acquired in 1992, all stores converted to Stage.
- Beall-Ladymon (Arkansas, Louisiana, Mississippi, Kansas). Acquired in 1994, all stores converted to Stage.
- Sperry's (Port Huron, Michigan) Acquired in 1996, a stand alone downtown department store, later converted to a movie theater.
- Uhlman's (Illinois, Indiana, Michigan, Ohio). Acquired in 1996. In addition to the Uhlman's name, Uhlman's operated Milliken's stores in Michigan. All were renamed Stage, except for the Milliken's locations in Michigan in Traverse City, Cadillac, Manistee, and Mount Pleasant which operated as Stage-Milliken until their closure in 2001.
- C. R. Anthony Co. (Montana, Idaho, Oregon, New Mexico, Oklahoma, Texas, Kansas, Wyoming) Acquired 1997, most stores converted to Stage, while some Anthony's, such as those located in Amarillo, Texas, became Bealls locations.
- Tri-North (Idaho, Montana, Nevada, Oregon, Washington) Most of these locations operated as Hub Clothing Stores before the 1998 acquisition, when all 15 stores converted to Stage.
- B. C. Moore & Sons, (Georgia, North Carolina, South Carolina). Acquired February 2006. By November 2006, 69 of these 76 stores were converted to the Peebles name and format, and the other nine were closed.

== Future and bankruptcy ==
On September 17, 2019, Stage Stores announced plans to convert all remaining Stage, Bealls, Palais Royal, Peebles, and Goodys department store locations into Gordmans stores by the end of 2020. This would mean that Stage Stores would completely exit the department store market and instead go all in as an off-price retailer.

By the end of fiscal year 2020, Stage planned to operate approximately 700 Gordmans Stores. CEO Michael Grazer cited the high sales increases in locations that had already been converted as the main factor in this decision.

After the COVID-19 pandemic caused most of its stores to temporarily close, Stage Stores announced that it would enter bankruptcy proceedings and liquidate its inventory, except for individual stores for which it could find a buyer. On October 21, 2020, Stage sold its intellectual property and a distribution center in Texas to Florida-based Bealls, Inc. for $7 million. Notably, this allowed the Florida chain to use the Bealls name nationwide; previously, Stage owned the rights to the Bealls name nationwide, except in Arizona, Florida and Georgia. Bealls also acquired the rights to the names of Stage's other chains, as well as all of its private label brands and customer lists. In 2022, New York-based online company BrandX acquired Stage Stores, Goodys, Gordmans, Palais Royal, and Peebles, as well as their private brands and plans to relaunch them online.
