= Peebles (department store) =

Former department store chain

- Company type: Department store
- Industry: Retail
- Founded: 1891; 135 years ago Lawrenceville, Virginia
- Founder: William Smith Peebles
- Defunct: 2020
- Fate: Bankruptcy
- Headquarters: Houston, Texas, U.S.
- Products: Apparel, accessories, cosmetics, footwear, and housewares
- Parent: Stage Stores, Inc. (2003-2020) BrandX.com (2022-present)
- Website: Archived official website at the Wayback Machine (archive index)

Peebles was an American chain of department stores owned by Stage Stores, Inc. and headquartered in Houston, Texas.

Peebles operated stores mainly in the eastern and upper-midwestern United States areas of Alabama, Connecticut, Delaware, Florida, Georgia, Illinois, Indiana, Iowa, Kentucky, Maryland, Massachusetts, Michigan, Minnesota, Mississippi, New Hampshire, New Jersey, New York, North Carolina, Ohio, Pennsylvania, Tennessee, Vermont, Virginia, West Virginia and Wisconsin.

The store specialized in retailing on-trend men's, women's, and children's apparel, accessories, cosmetics, footwear, and housewares. Brands exclusively found at Peebles included Valerie Stevens; Signature Studio; Sun River; Rustic Blue; Rebecca Malone; and Wishful Park.

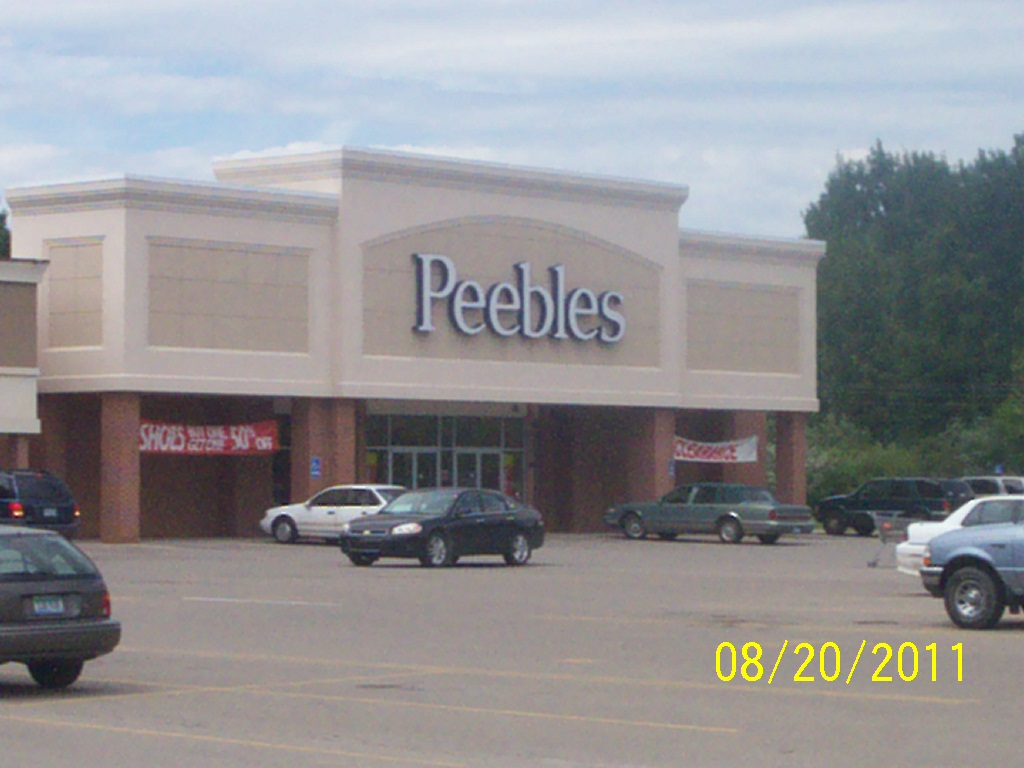
A Peebles location in Alpena, Michigan on August 20, 2011

== History ==
Peebles was founded in 1891 by William Smith Peebles, who opened his first store in Lawrenceville, Virginia.

Peebles mainly concentrated on small towns that didn’t have department stores, thus avoiding bigger cities and higher rents.

In 1981 the company acquired The Collins Company, a line of mid-priced, comparable stores. Collins was based in Charlotte, North Carolina.

The family sold the company in 1986 for $85 million (~$206 million in 2024) to two investment banking firms and to Peebles’ senior management.

The company had been sold twice before Stage Stores acquired Peebles in 2003 when it was based in South Hill, Virginia. At the time, Peebles had more than 125 stores primarily in the Mid-Atlantic, Southeastern and Midwest states.

After decades of expansion Peebles acquired the Nashville-based upscale Harveys Department Stores chain in September 1988, renaming the stores as Peebles.

In 1998, Peebles purchased Watson's, a similar chain, later renaming all the Watson's stores as Peebles.

Houston-based Stage Stores purchased Peebles for $167 million in cash and $46.9 million in debt in 2003. In August 2019, it was announced that all Peebles stores, along with all other stores operated by Stage Stores Inc, would be converted into Gordmans stores.

On May 10, 2020, Stage announced it had filed for Chapter 11 bankruptcy, and that it would liquidate all locations, Peebles and Gordmans included, unless a buyer purchased the chain. Ultimately, no buyer was found, and going out of business sales began at all locations.
