= BRapid =

Bus rapid transit service in Baton Rouge, Louisiana, United States

Overview
- System: CATS

Route
- Locale: Baton Rouge, Louisiana
- Start: North Transfer Center
- End: Louisiana State University
- Length: 10 mi (16 km)
- Stations: 24

Service
- Frequency: Peak: 20 minutes Off-peak: 30 minutes
- Weekend frequency: 30 minutes

BRapid is an under construction bus rapid transit service in Baton Rouge, Louisiana, United States. It will be operated by CATS on a 10 miles (16 km) corridor between the newly constructed North Transfer Center and Louisiana State University. Construction began with the new North Transfer Center in July 2024, with full service planned to begin near the end of 2026. The system will use nine 35-foot (11 m) electric buses on a route without dedicated lanes, but featuring transit signal priority.

== History ==
Planning for bus rapid transit in Baton Rouge began in earnest in the mid-2010s. CATS had received a $1.8 million federal grant for the purpose in 2006, however, this had languished without a supporting local match. At first, CATS had viewed the Florida Street corridor as a priority, but this shifted to Nicholson Drive in 2018 as the city also studied a streetcar to connect downtown with LSU.

By late 2019, the city received a $15 million grant for the project known at the time as the Plank-Nicholson BRT which now would reach almost 10 miles across town. The expanded project would provide service to 29,000 residents and 30,000 LSU students on a route from LSU on the south, up Nicholson Drive and Plan Road to a proposed transfer center off the Airline Highway. At a cost of $54 million, the project also included major improvements to the adjoining corridors including new sidewalks and traffic signals.

A groundbreaking for the project was held on July 9, 2024, with construction beginning on the North Transfer Center, at 5275 Airline Highway. The eight bus bay facility will serve as the northern terminus and a new transfer point for the transit system. Construction progressed to downtown Baton Rouge by February 2026, with an expected opening by the end of the year.

== Operations ==
The route will run northeast–south through downtown Baton Rouge. The 24 stations include covered platforms, with level boarding, arrival signage, and bike racks. Bus headways are intended to be every 20 minutes on weekdays and every 30 minutes on weekends. Buses for the BRapid system will be nine 35-foot electric buses.
