= Saucy Nugs Guy =

2020 viral video

- Release date: September 2, 2020
- Running time: 2 minutes, 16 seconds
- Language: English

Saucy Nugs Guy is an internet viral video featuring 27-year-old Nebraskan Ander Christensen addressing the Lincoln City Council in Lincoln, Nebraska with a tongue-in-cheek reasoning on why the term "boneless chicken wings" should be removed from the national vocabulary. The video was originally posted to YouTube on September 2, 2020, before making its way to Twitter and racking of hundreds of thousands of views within 24-hours of being posted.

== Coverage ==
Within a matter of days, Christensen's plea was picked up by dozens of news and media outlets across the United States and even Canada and Ireland.

On September 4, 2020, Christensen collaborated with the University of Nebraska–Lincoln making a spoof "BREAKING NEWS" video with Husker football coach Scott Frost. The video was posted to the Nebraska Huskers Twitter page which generally announces news in relation to the university's athletic department. The fifty-one-second video has received over 800,000 views as of June 2021.

== Reactions ==
Buffalo Wild Wings responded to the viral video in a statement shared with Fox News. The restaurant chain stated it "disagrees" with the notion that boneless wings should be renamed. An excerpt from the statement read:

"We serve boneless wings – our guests love them and we love them! So while we disagree with Ander on his mission, we respect his passion for chicken. So we’re giving him free traditional wings for a year. We’re also going to donate $1 for every boneless wing sold on Labor Day in Lincoln, Neb., to the local Boys & Girls Club."

The retailer Omaha Steaks also weighed in on the conversation tweeting on September 2, 2020 "We don't take political sides, but this issue is too important. Our butchers stand with Ander." Omaha Steaks even went as far as to create "WE STAND WITH ANDER" yard signs. On September 4, 2020, GrubHub tweeted "We respect your passion Ander, and we stand with you. #SaucyNugs." The entertainment company Main Event which hosts parties and events at its forty-plus locations across the United States declared that it would rename its boneless wings to saucy nugs and make a ten percent donation to the Lincoln Food Bank if its posted received 100,000 shares.

== Personal life ==
Christensen is a chemical engineer and graduated from the University of Nebraska–Lincoln in 2017. He lived abroad in China for a brief period doing missionary work. At the time of Christensen's viral fame his father, Roy Christensen was a member of the Lincoln City Council, who can be heard saying "that's my son" on the video.
