= Capital Area Transit =

Capital Area Transit may refer to:

- Capital Area Transit (Harrisburg), the public transit agency serving the Harrisburg, Pennsylvania, area
- Capital Area Transit (Raleigh), the public transit agency serving Raleigh, North Carolina
- Capital Area Transportation (CAT), the public transportation system in Bismarck and Mandan, North Dakota; see Bis-Man Transit

== See also ==
- Capital Area Transportation Authority, Lansing Michigan
- Capital Area Transit System, East Baton Rouge Parish, Louisiana
