= LSU Tiger Trails =

University shuttle system in Baton Rouge, Louisiana

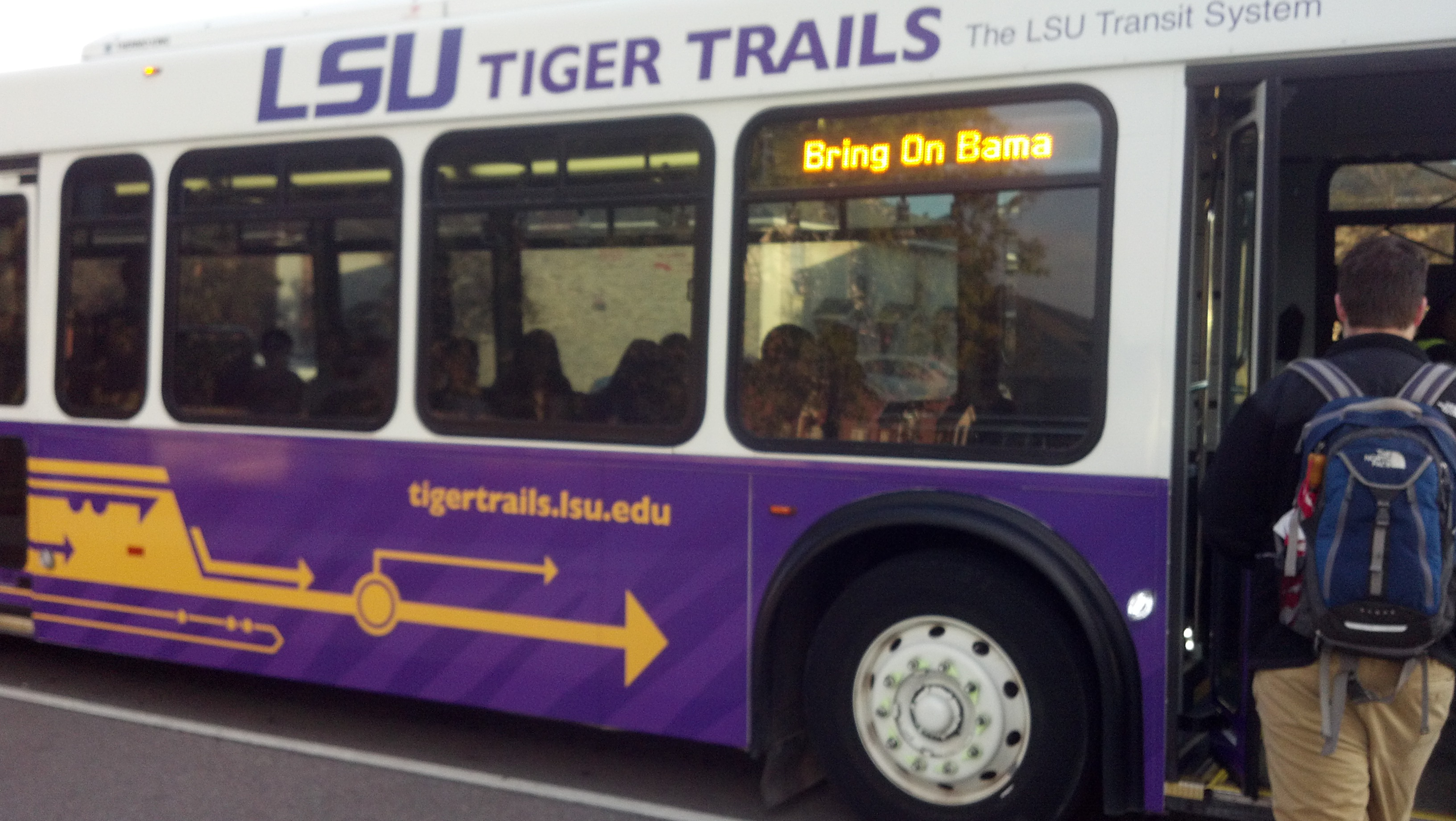
- Founded: 2009
- Headquarters: Baton Rouge, Louisiana
- Locale: Louisiana State University
- Service area: LSU Campus & Surrounding LSU Community
- Routes: 15
- Fleet: 23
- Operator: Transdev
- Website: https://sites01.lsu.edu/wp/tigertrails/

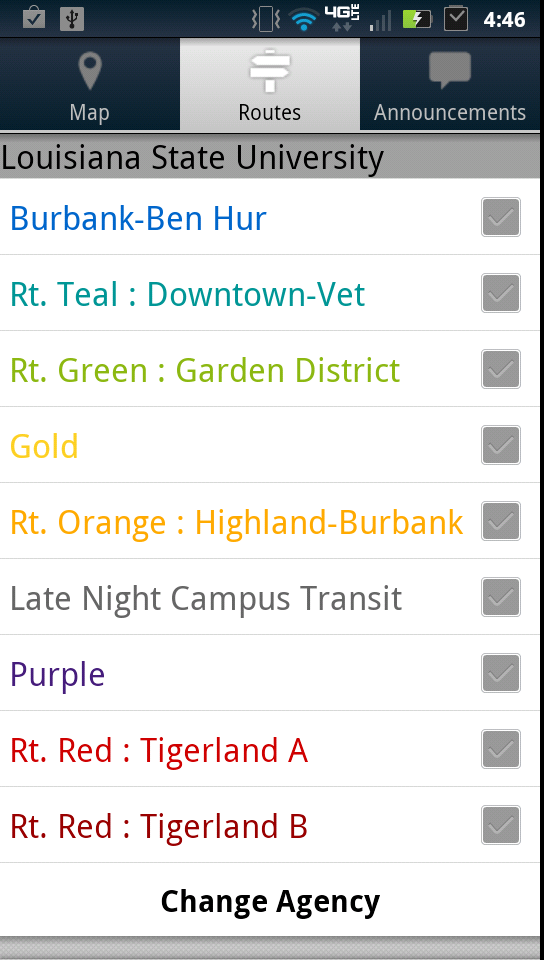
Screenshot of TransLōc bus tracking app in 2011, taken on Android Bionic

LSU Tiger Trails is the alternative transportation system providing bus service for students, faculty, staff and visitors, both on and off the campus of Louisiana State University. The LSU transit system was formerly operated by First Transit until 2023 when the company was bought out by Transdev. Services are under contract with LSU's Office of Parking & Transportation Services, formerly known as the Office of Parking, Traffic & Transportation. There are a total of 31 buses in the Tiger Trails fleet. During daytime operating hours, the transit system is capable of operating up to 21 buses during peak hours with three back-up, and six small buses for on demand service. It is free of charge for all LSU students, staff, and faculty.

== History ==
From 1974 to 2009, Louisiana State University used Baton Rouge's Capital Area Transit System (CATS) to transport its students, faculty and visitors on and off campus. The motion to create LSU Tiger Trails arose in 2008 due to poor bus service and unfulfilled requirements offered by CATS. The Student Government of LSU, along with the Office of Parking & Transportation Services, received complaints filed against both the service and drivers of CATS. The LSU Student Government requested that the university ask CATS to improve their service several times. However, CATS did not take action, prompting the university to taking the initial steps of breaking away from the CATS contract and starting their own transit system.

=== Beginning ===
In September 2008, the president and senior consultant of Solstice Transportation Consulting, Mitch Skyer came to meet with "Gary Graham, director of the Office of Parking, Traffic & Transportation [sic]," along "with administration, Student Government, transportation officials and passenger representatives" to initiate contact and being to evaluate the transit system. The Solstice Transportation Group held public forums, generated questionnaires, and researched the surrounding area of LSU for population of the LSU community. Using their findings, Solstice then mapped projections of routes which the buses should take to maximize usage and reduce route completion time. Solstice Transportation Group presented their projections to the committee in charge of deciding the matter, and the committee was in favor of the outcome of Solstice's projections. LSU put the projections of their new system up for bid to multiple transportation companies. Out of the several companies who submitted their own proposals, First Transit won the bid because they were well priced and responsible.

The LSU student body, facility and staff name voted on the name for the new system. The top three most popular names were Tiger Trails, Easy Tiger, and Geaux Tiger. Tiger Trails took the majority of the vote with 47.3 percent, followed by Easy Tiger commanding 33.4 percent and Geaux Tiger with 19.3 percent.

== Routes ==
As of 2025, Tiger Trails operates 12 weekday routes.

== Current fleet ==
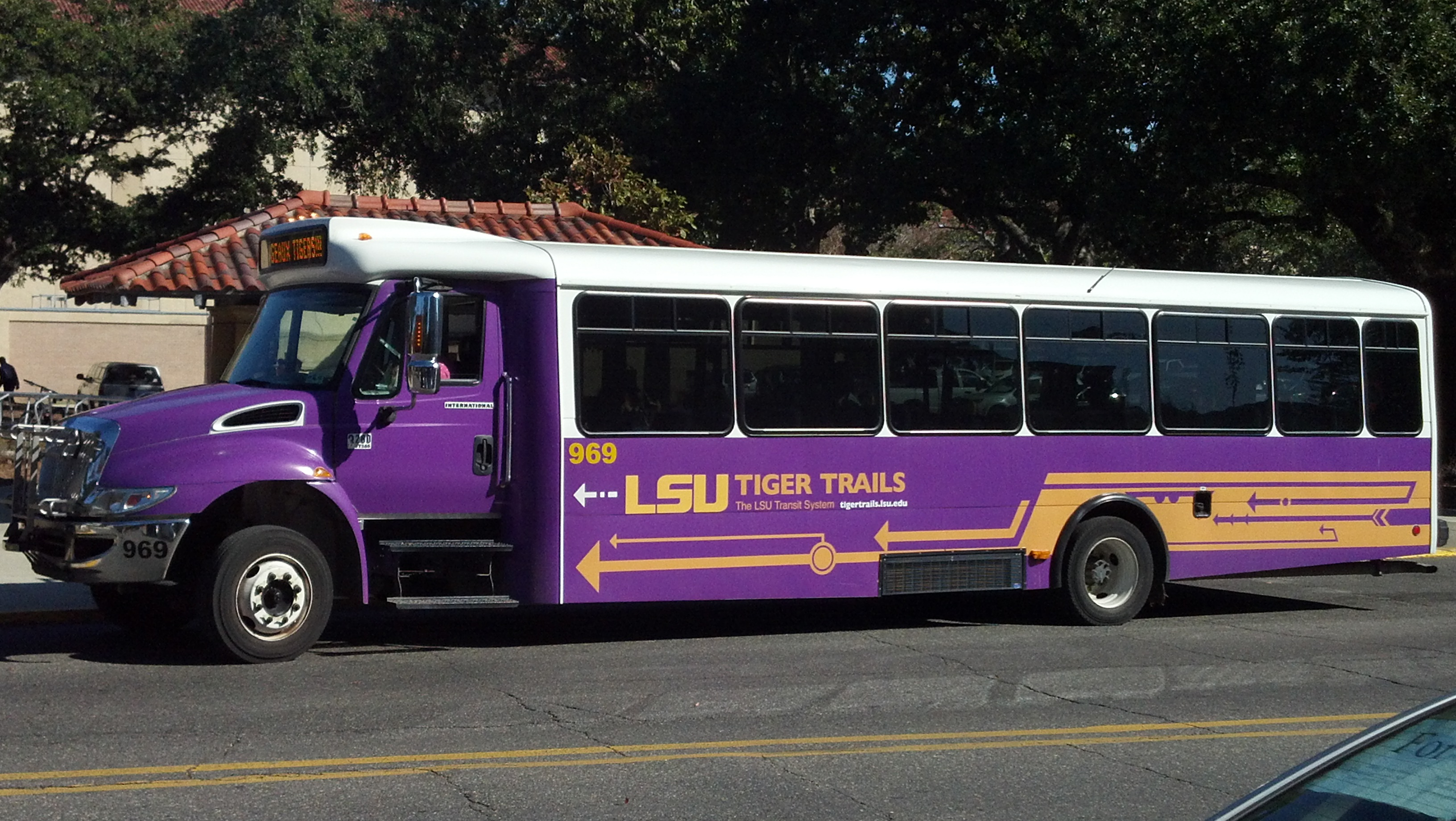
Tiger Trail's International bus type

There are two types of buses in the fleet. The majority of the fleet consists of ElDorado buses costing around $300,000. There are ten 30 ft and fifteen 40 ft Eldorados which are used for the fixed routes. The other type is the Glaval buses which are built on a Ford truck or van chassis with a passenger cab, and cost around $150,000. There are two E-550 vans and four F-550 buses. These are used for on-demand services running from 5:30–12:00pm 7 days a week.
