= Dave & Buster's =

American restaurant and entertainment business

Dave & Buster's Entertainment, Inc.
- Type: Public
- Traded as: Nasdaq: PLAY
- Industry: Entertainment/Restaurant (Eatertainment)
- Founded: August 31, 1982; 44 years ago, in Dallas, Texas
- Founder: David O. Corriveau; James W. "Buster" Corley
- Headquarters: Dallas, Texas, U.S.
- Number of locations: 250 (2026)
- Key people: Darin Harper (CEO)
- Revenue: ▼US$2.10 billion (2025)
- Net income: ▼ −US$48.7 million (2025)
- Subsidiaries: Main Event Entertainment
- Website: www.daveandbusters.com

Dave & Buster's Entertainment, Inc. (D&B) is an American restaurant and entertainment business headquartered in Dallas, Texas. Founded in 1982 by David "Dave" Corriveau and James "Buster" Corley in Dallas, the company was created after they realized that patrons were moving back and forth between their respective arcade and bar establishments in Little Rock, Arkansas in the 1970s, prompting them to partner in creating the combined arcade/bar/restaurant concept. Each Dave & Buster's location has a full-service restaurant, full bar, and a video arcade, the latter of which is known as the "Million Dollar Midway". As of September 2026, the company has 184 Dave and Buster's branded locations in the United States, Puerto Rico and Canada, as well as six international franchise stores across the countries of Australia, the Dominican Republic, India, and the Philippines, with a location in Mexico City, Mexico set to open before the end of the company's 2026 fiscal year. The company also owns the Main Event brand of similar activity and food & beverage based stores as a wholly owned subsidiary company, which features more than 65 locations under that brand name.

== History ==
Original Dave & Buster's logo used from 1982 to 2014.

Previous logo from 2014 to 2020. It is still in use at many locations.

In 1982, David Oliver "Dave" Corriveau (September 15, 1951–February 7, 2015) and James Winston "Buster" Corley (January 2, 1951–January 2, 2023) opened the first Dave & Buster's in Dallas. Corley had previously operated a bar called "Buster's" in Little Rock, Arkansas, next door to a saloon and game parlor called first "Cash McCool's" & then "Slick Willy's World of Entertainment", owned by Corriveau. After opening Dave & Buster's, the two operated as co-CEOs.

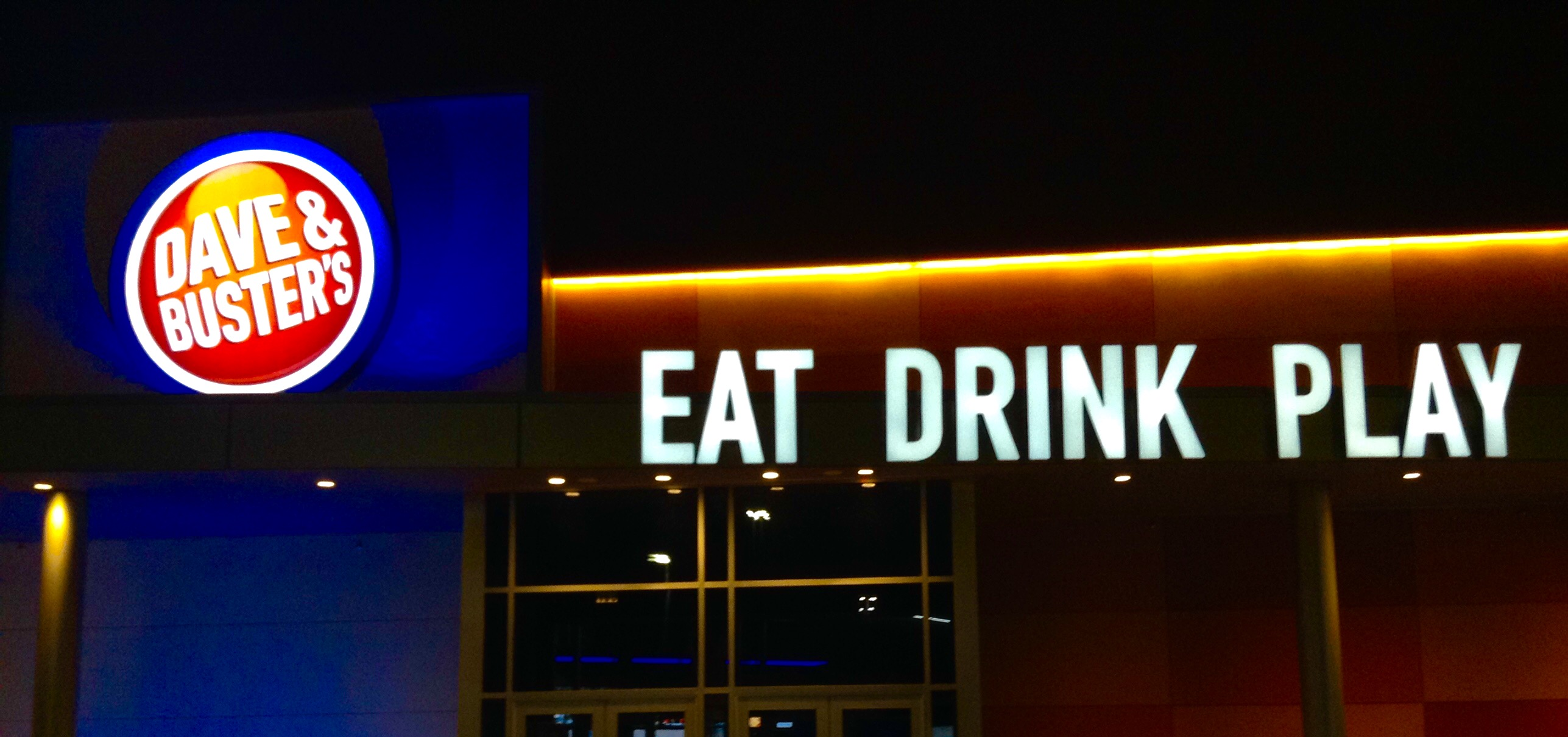
Dave & Buster's in Manchester, Connecticut

In 1989, Edison Brothers Stores purchased a majority of the ownership in the restaurant to finance further expansion into other cities. Dave & Buster's was spun off from Edison Brothers, and went public with Andy Newman as chairman in 1995. By 1997, the chain could be found in ten locations across the country.

D&B acquired nine Jillian's locations after Jillian's filed for Chapter 11 Bankruptcy in 2004. Seven of these Jillian's locations were rebranded with the Dave & Buster's name, while two were closed following the acquisition. The company announced on December 8, 2005, that it would be acquired by private equity firm Wellspring Capital Management. On July 16, 2008, Dave & Buster's Holdings Inc, filed with the SEC to again become a publicly traded company. The company had set a date for the Initial public offering IPO of October 5, 2012. However, it pulled out right before it opened. In June 2010, Oak Hill Capital Partners, in partnership with the company's management team, completed its acquisition of Dave & Buster's from Wellspring Capital Management.

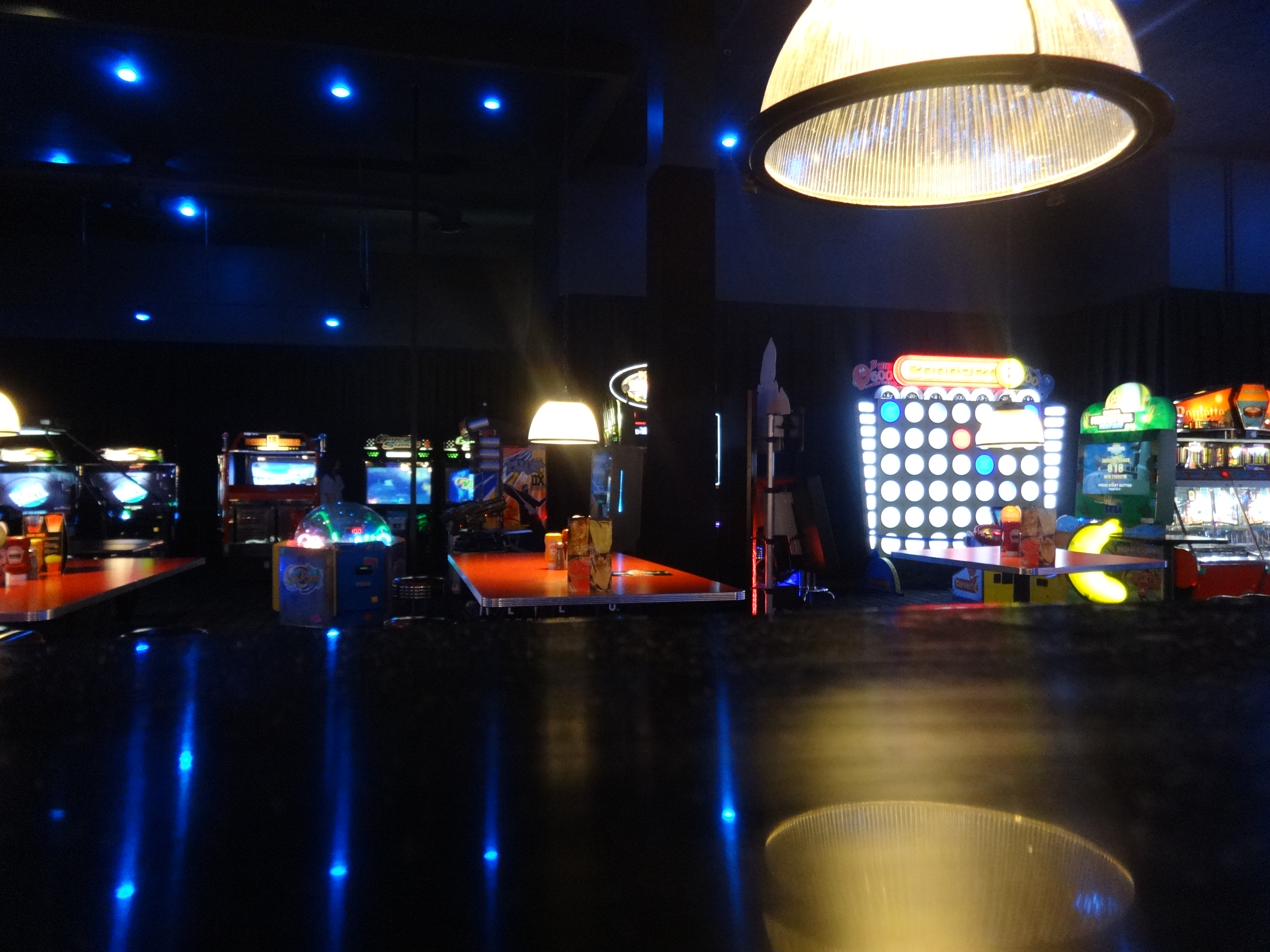
The inside of a Dave & Buster's in Marietta, Georgia

In October 2014, Dave & Buster's launched a second IPO, selling its 5.88 million shares at an offering price range of $16–18. The offering raised $94 million, to be used for debt repayments. Shares are traded on the NASDAQ stock exchange using the symbol PLAY.

Co-founder David Corriveau died on February 7, 2015 at his home in Dallas, Texas.

Dave & Buster's, as with all other entertainment and restaurant businesses, was affected by the COVID-19 pandemic due to restrictions on non-essential businesses. The company's same-store sales fell by 70% during fiscal year 2020. As restrictions eased, the company began to recover in fiscal year 2021, being down by 10% only. The case of Omicron variant spread still affected the business resulting in a sales decrease in the fourth quarter of 2021.

Dave & Buster's CEO Brian Jenkins retired in September 2021, with chairman Kevin Sheehan named interim CEO. On April 6, 2022, Dave & Buster's announced that it would acquire the Plano, Texas-based family entertainment center chain Main Event Entertainment from Ardent Leisure and RedBird Capital Partners for $835 million, with its CEO Chris Morris becoming the new CEO of Dave & Buster's upon the completion of the sale in June 2022.

On January 2, 2023, co-founder James "Buster" Corley died of suicide that was caused by a self-inflicted gunshot wound sustained in his home near White Rock Lake. His daughter Kate Corley said that her father had suffered a stroke four months earlier that "caused severe damage to the communication and personality part of his brain".

In 2023, the chain began to pilot a new location format known as the "store of the future", which began to expand to other locations in 2024. It focuses on new types of interactive social gaming spaces (such as electronic darts and shuffleboard tables) and updates to the bar experience (including a new self-serve beer wall in the arcade area, viewing areas with larger televisions, a 40 foot (480 in) video wall, and a "VIP watch room").

== Operations ==
=== Food and drinks ===
Items on the Dave & Buster's menu are offered from early lunch until late night and include pastas, burgers, steaks, seafood, chicken and desserts. The menu is frequently updated to reflect current trends and guest favorites. Some locations serve Sunday brunch. Buffets are available for special events and private parties. All D&Bs offer full bar service. Dave & Buster's is more targeted towards an adult clientele than most location-based entertainment in general, with all guests under 21 required to be accompanied by a guardian and only allowed in until 10 p.m.

=== Games ===
Dave & Buster's dubbed their arcade section, which features interactive games and simulators, "Million Dollar Midway". In 1997, Dave & Buster's introduced the Power Card, a declining balance card or 'debit card' that replaces traditional tokens and tickets, and is required to activate most arcade games and can be reloaded at "power stations." The Power Card is intended to enable customers to activate games more easily and encourage extended play of games to increase customer spending. By replacing most coin operations, the Power Card has reduced the technical difficulties and maintenance issues associated with coin-operated equipment. In 2015, Dave & Buster's installed proximity game card readers that allow guests to simply tap on the readers to play. Since 2020, Power Cards have been able to be added to Google Pay and Apple Wallet through the DING DING DING app.

=== Events and sponsorships ===
Dave & Buster's is a corporate sponsor of the Ultimate Fighting Championship organization. There are screening rooms for every UFC pay-per-view and episode of The Ultimate Fighter. D&B also sponsors the charity Dave Bevans' Children in the fundraising event "D&B for DB's".

Prior sponsorships include a World Wrestling Entertainment match and a 2009 tour by the rock band Bowling for Soup. The WWE match took place on the July 20, 2009, edition of WWE Raw on the USA Network. It is believed to be the first match on any WWE program to have a specific sponsor associated with it.

Dave & Buster's also sponsors postgame reports of San Jose Sharks games.

== International ==
=== Current ===
In January 2025, Dave & Busters reported that they opened the first Indian branch under a partnership with the Malpani Group in Bengaluru on December 26, 2024. A second outlet was opened in Andheri, Mumbai with a third opened in Tagore Garden, Delhi in 2026.

Dave & Busters opened its first store in the Philippines on October 11, 2025 at the Opus Mall in Bridgetowne, Quezon City, Metro Manila, under a franchising agreement with The Bistro Group.

They opened their first store in Australia on May 16, 2026 in the northern suburb of Clarkson, Western Australia in the city of Perth.

=== Former ===
The firm opened a UK restaurant in 1998 in Cribbs Causeway. Another restaurant was subsequently opened in Solihull. The UK restaurants were unsuccessful and both have since closed.

== See also ==
- List of restaurants in Dallas
