= Capital Area Transit System =

Public transportation provider in Louisiana, US

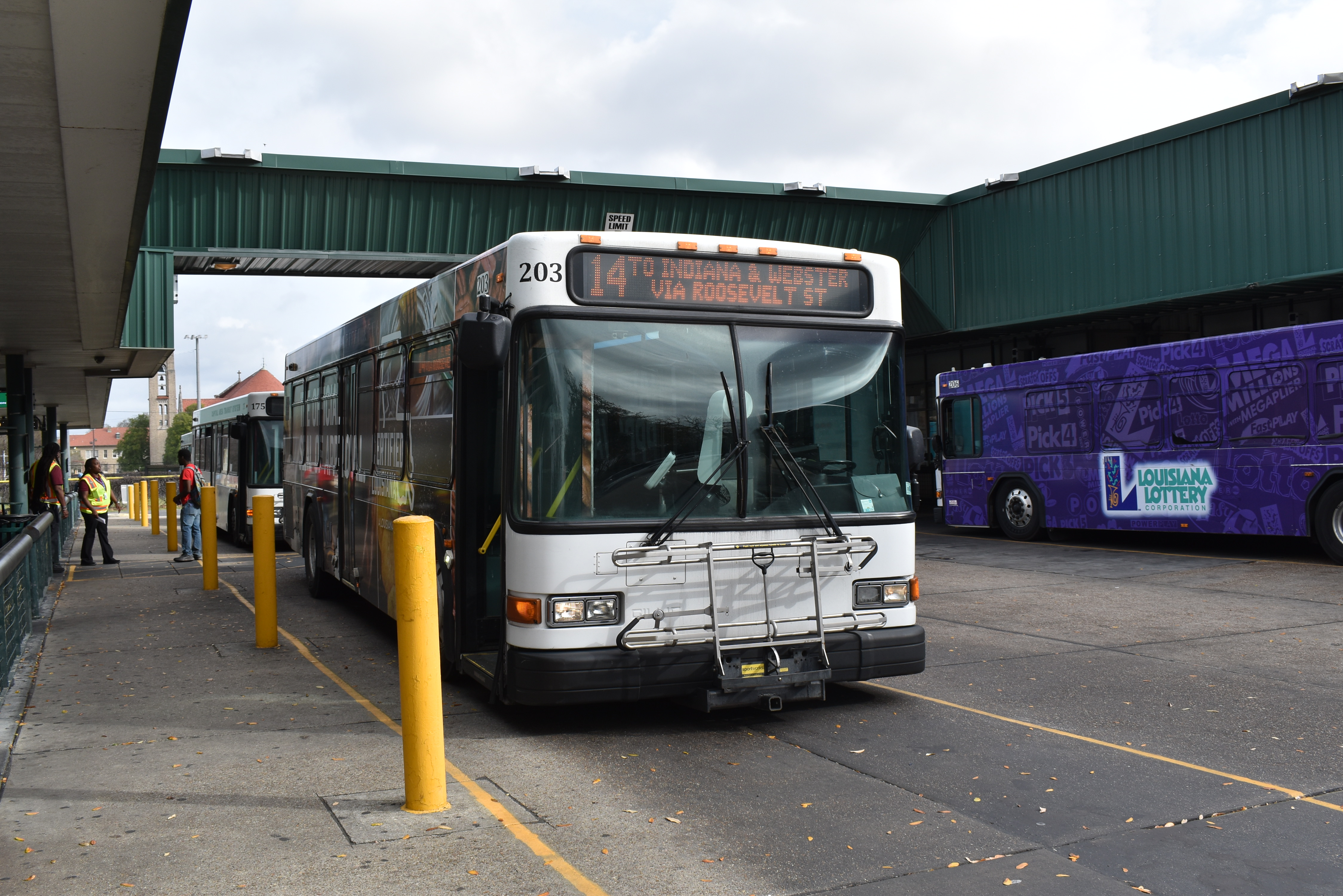
- Headquarters: 2250 Florida Blvd
- Locale: Baton Rouge, Louisiana
- Service area: East Baton Rouge Parish, Louisiana
- Service type: Bus service
- Routes: 30
- Hubs: 5
- Daily ridership: 2,400 (weekdays, Q2 2026)
- Annual ridership: 1,250,800 (2025)
- Fuel type: Battery electric, Diesel
- Website: brcats.com

Capital Area Transit System, labeling itself CATS, is a public transportation provider in East Baton Rouge Parish, Louisiana. It serves the city and several west bank suburbs. In 2025, the system had a ridership of 1,250,800, or about 2,400 per weekday as of the second quarter of 2026.

== History ==
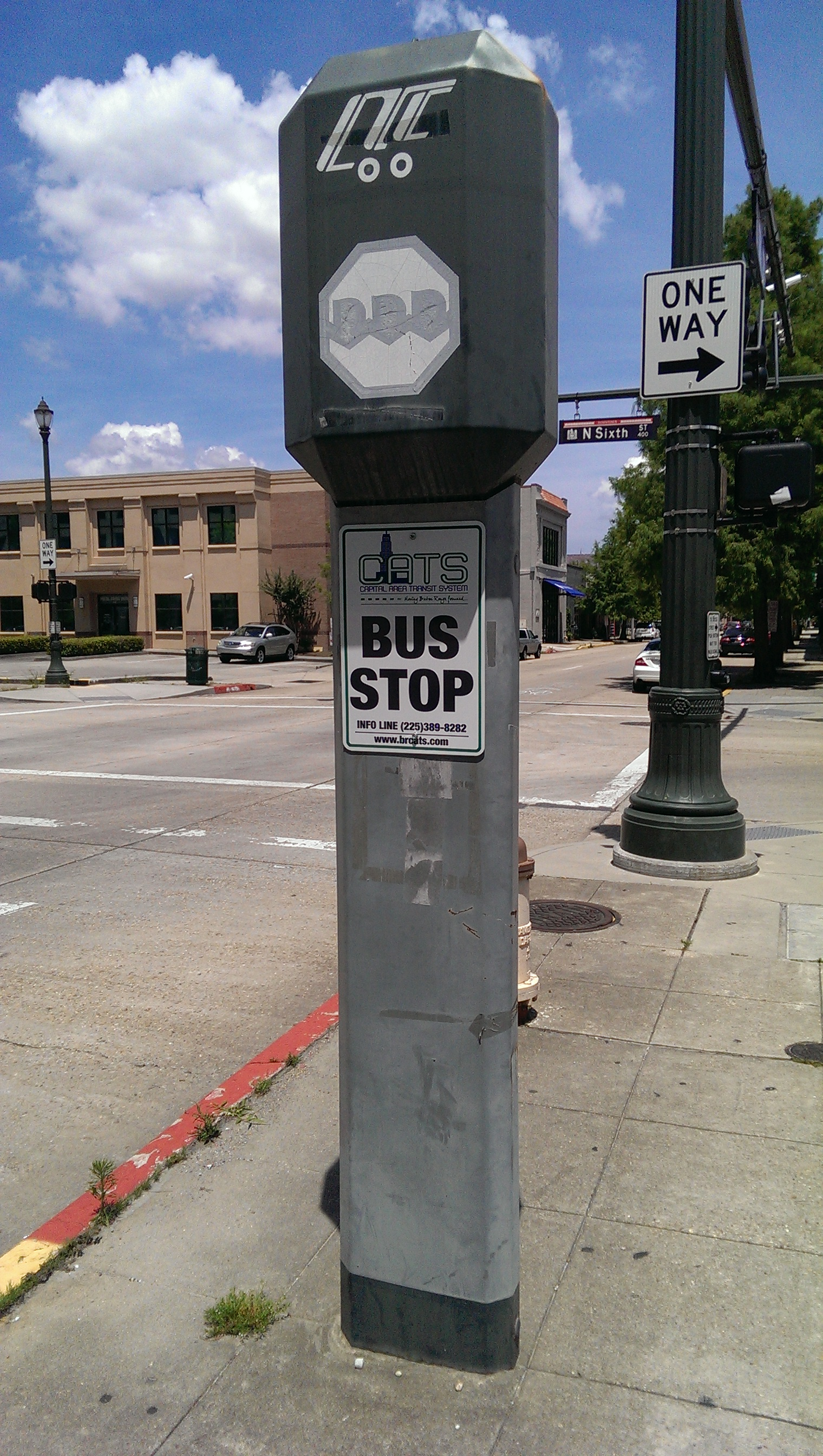
CTC bus stop pylon featuring modern CATS sign.

Originally formed as the Capital Transit Corporation by the City of Baton Rouge, the system came to be known as the Capital Area Transit System in 2004 during a re-branding of the agency. CATS was later defined by an act of the Louisiana Legislature in 2005. The act established the transit agency and dictates its governance but did not create any revenue source for CATS. Ballot measures to create tax revenue for the system failed to pass in 2009 and 2010, and attempts to reduce service further and increase fares were rejected by the Metro Council, leaving CATS facing a budget shortfall that would have resulted in a complete system shutdown by midyear 2012. CATS finally found stable funding that same year and avoided shutdown when voters in the cities of Baton Rouge and Baker approved a property tax increase.

== Criticisms ==
The agency is often criticised as providing unreliable service, with delays of an hour or more common. Although CATS has worked to address this issue, proponents of the system have voiced concerns that progress has been slow and some changes lacked proper planning.

Louisiana State University created its own shuttle service, Tiger Trails, in 2008 due to complaints rising from CATS's service to and from the campus.

Brian Marshall resigned as CEO on April 22, 2013 due to controversies surrounding the agency.

Bob Mirabito resigned as CEO on May 6, 2016 due to controversies and criticisms regarding his operation of the agency.

== Routes ==
Below is the new, route list effective February 24, 2019. Most, but not all, routes connect two hubs together to allow for cross-town connectivity.

- 8 – Gus Young – BRCC (was the 8 Gus Young originally; merged with the 23 Foster on January 24, 2010; split off as the 8 Gus Young – BRCC on March 30, 2014)
- 10 – Scenic Hwy. - Southern University (renamed from 10 Scotlandville on March 30, 2014)
- 11 – Northside Circulator (renamed from 11 Harding on March 30, 2014, with major route changes)
- 12 – Government St. - Jefferson Hwy. (renamed from 12 Government – Drusilla on March 30, 2014)
- 14 – Thomas Delpit Drive (created on May 18, 2003 as 14 Downtown; merged with the 9 Thomas Delpit to form the 14 Downtown – Thomas Delpit; major changes on March 30, 2014 and renamed 14 Thomas Delpit Drive)
- 15 – Blount Road (created on February 24, 2019)
- 16 – Capitol Park Shuttle (created on October 28, 2003)
- 17 – Perkins Road
- 18 – LSU – Cortana Mall (created on March 30, 2014)
- 20 – North Acadian Thruway (created on March 30, 2014)
- 21 – Fairfields Avenue – Cortana Mall (created on March 30, 2014)
- 22 – Winbourne Avenue – Cortana Mall (created on March 30, 2014)
- 23 – Foster Drive (merged with the 8 Gus Young to form the 23 Foster-Gus Young; resplit on March 30, 2014)
- 41 – Plank Road
- 44 – Florida Boulevard – Cortana Mall (Was the 43/44 Florida until February 2007)
- 46 – Gardere-OLOL-L'Auberge (Was the 46/47 Highland until June 27, 2010)
- 47 – Highland Road (Was the 46/47 Highland until June 27, 2010)
- 54 – Airline Hwy. North – Southern University (renamed from 54 Airline on March 30, 2014)
- 57 – Sherwood Forest Blvd. (renamed from 57 Sherwood on March 30, 2014)
- 58 – Coursey Blvd. - O'Neal Ln. (created on March 30, 2014)
- 59 – East Florida Blvd. - O'Neal Ln. (created on March 30, 2014)
- 60 – Medical Corridor (created in 2013)
- 70 – Baker Limited (created on March 30, 2014)
- 72 – Florida Blvd. Limited Stops (created on March 30, 2014)
- 80 – Southern University Shuttles

¹Most routes utilizing the North Street Town Square hub currently stop at the corner in front of the Old State Capitol just before the North Street Transit Pavilion due to congestion caused by bus layovers at the stop.

=== Former Routes ===
- 3 – Goodwood (eliminated on March 30, 2014)
- 5 – College (eliminated on March 30, 2014)
- 9 – Thomas Delpit (merged with the 14 Downtown Shuttle on January 24, 2010)
- 13 – Fairfield (eliminated on March 30, 2014)
- 15 – Downtown Express (created in fall 2009; eliminated on March 30, 2014)
- 15 – Garden District Trolley (created on November 30, 2014; eliminated December 11, 2016)
- 18 – Baker / Zachary (created on September 19, 2011; eliminated on March 30, 2014)
- 24 – Coursey (created on April 2, 2006; eliminated on November 30, 2006)
- 26 – Greenwell Springs (created on April 2, 2006; eliminated on November 30, 2006)
- 27 – Groom Road (created on April 2, 2006; eliminated on April 1, 2007)
- 38 – Blount Road (created on January 1, 2006; combined with the 39 Groom Road to form the 27 Groom Road on April 2, 2006)
- 39 – Groom Road (created on October 16, 2005; combined with the 38 Blount Road to form the 27 Groom Road on April 2, 2006)
- 45 – Cortana Express (created in fall 2009; eliminated on March 30, 2014)
- 46L – L'Auberge / Emerge Limited (eliminated on June 28, 2015)
- 50 – Glen Oaks / Greendale Circulator (created on March 30, 2014; eliminated on February 24, 2019)
- 52 – Baker Circulator (created on March 30, 2014; eliminated on February 24, 2019)
- 55 – Mall to Mall (created on January 30, 2010; eliminated on March 30, 2014)
- 55 – East Florida Blvd. (created on March 30, 2014; eliminated on February 24, 2019)
- 56 – Mall to Mall via Drusilla Lane (created on March 30, 2014; eliminated on February 24, 2019)
- 58 – Woman's Express Route (created in 2013; eliminated on March 30, 2014)
- 70 – Prairieville Park-and-Ride (created on January 1, 2006; eliminated on November 30, 2006)
- 102 – O'Neal Ln. Park-and-Ride to Downtown (created on March 30, 2014; eliminated on January 31, 2016)
- 103 – Airport Express (created on March 30, 2014; eliminated on February 24, 2019)
- 105 – Mall of Louisiana to Downtown (created on March 30, 2014; eliminated on January 31, 2016)

== CATS OnDemand ==
The buses that operate CATS fixed routes are equipped to accommodate most riders with disabilities. For riders whose disability prevents them from using the standard routes at all, CATS provides the OnDemand paratransit service. An application process must be followed prior to using the service, and all start and end points must be within 3/4 mile of the CATS service area. Paratransit customers pay the same $1.75 fare.

== See also ==
- List of bus transit systems in the United States
- New Orleans–Baton Rouge passenger rail
