= Cortana Mall =

- Location: Baton Rouge, Louisiana, United States
- Coordinates: 30.457236°N 91.093186°W
- Address: 9401 Cortana Place
- Opened: August 4, 1976; 50 years ago
- Renovated: 1991
- Closed: September 18, 2019; 7 years ago
- Developer: Mall Properties
- Owner: Moonbeam Equities
- Architect: Milton J. Womack
- Num. of stores: 0 (formerly 110)
- Num. of anchor tenants: 0 (formerly 6)
- Floor area: 1,432,889 sq ft (133,119.7 m^{2})
- Floors: 1 (2 in anchors)

Cortana Mall (formerly The Mall at Cortana) was an enclosed shopping mall in Baton Rouge, Louisiana, and was at the intersection of Airline Highway and Florida Blvd (U.S. Route 190). It was last owned by Moonbeam Equities of Las Vegas, Nevada. It opened in 1976 and was demolished in 2021. An Amazon distribution center now occupies the land.

== History ==
Cortana Mall opened in 1976 on the site of the old Cortana Plantation. Goudchaux's/Maison Blanche was the first store to open, opening on February 16. The rest of the mall, initially containing 100 inline tenants opened on August 4, with three additional anchors, JCPenney, Dillard's, and Sears, as well as a three-screen cinema operated by General Cinema Corporation, opening in the remaining months of 1976. At the time of its opening, with 1.2 million square feet of space, Cortana Mall was the largest shopping mall in the south and 14th largest in the United States. A fifth anchor, H. J. Wilson Co., opened October 17, 1977. Mervyn's announced plans in late 1986 to join the mall as a sixth anchor, with the store opening July 17, 1987. At this time, ten extra inline tenants joined the mall. With this addition, Cortana Mall had space for about 140 stores and 1.6 million square feet of space. The mall's movie theater closed in 1988 when its lease was not renewed.

In the 1990s, the mall underwent renovations, first in 1991 to update the interior and add security and then in 1997 to update its exterior signage and landscaping. It was in 1997 when Cortana Mall rebranded as the Mall at Cortana. With the rebranding, the Mall at Cortana began to experience decline due to the Mall of Louisiana opening in South Baton Rouge in 1997. The issue was exacerbated when Towne Center at Cedar Lodge opened 3 miles away on Corporate Boulevard in 2005, causing many stores with duplicate Cortana locations to close or not renew their leases. It was also in the late 1990s that many of the anchors experienced name and location changes.

The Dillard's store at the mall was originally Goudchaux's, which was the first anchor to open at Cortana Mall. After the Sternberg family acquired New Orleans–based Maison Blanche in 1982, Goudchaux rebranded as Maison Blanche/Goudchaux and then became Maison Blanche in 1988 to discern itself from the similarly named Godchaux's Department Store in New Orleans. Mercantile Stores purchased the Maison Blanche stores from the Sternberg family in 1992 and operated the store until selling it to Dillard's in 1998. As a result, Dillard's relocated from its existing store to the former Maison Blanche. In 2009, the store converted to a single-level clearance center, which was the last store to close in May 2021.

The original Dillard's was then sold to Saks Incorporated, who converted it to Parisian in 1998, then McRae's a year later. When May Properties purchased the McRae's (in Cortana) and Parisian (in the Mall of Louisiana) in 2001, the two stores reopened as Foley's on March 28, 2001. After Foley's was acquired by Macy's in September 2006, the Cortana and Mall of Louisiana stores both became Macy's.

In 1985, Service Merchandise acquired H. J. Wilson Co. and rebranded the Cortana Mall store as such. Service Merchandise closed in early 2002 when the chain went bankrupt, leaving the anchor slot vacant until Steve & Barry's opened in 2004. Steve and Barry's closed as a result of the recession in 2009, leaving the space vacant for one year until Virginia College opened its Baton Rouge campus in the former store.

The mall's last anchor, Mervyns, closed in 2006 when the store decided to focus its efforts on the Southwestern United States.

In 2009, several new inline tenants opened in the mall, and the mall's name reverted to Cortana Mall. In 2012, Mall Properties, the original owner of the mall, sold Cortana Mall back to its lenders and brought in Woodmont Company to manage the property. In 2013, Moonbeam Equities of Las Vegas, NV purchased the mall's inline tenants and the old Mervyn's for $6 million.

During the late 2010s, Cortana Mall experienced retail freefall with numerous anchor and inline tenant closures. As of March 2016, the mall anchors were: Sears, Dillard's Clearance Center, JCPenney, Macy's, and Virginia College. In April 2016, Macy's announced it was leaving Cortana Mall.

JCPenney at The Mall at Cortana

On January 4, 2017, it was announced the Sears store would be closing in the spring of that year. During the same week, Footlocker announced they would be leaving the mall as well. On March 17, 2017, it was announced the JCPenney store will be closing on July 31 of that year. The closure of JCPenney left Dillard's Clearance Center as the only department anchor left. On March 27, 2017, in an article from theadvocate.com highlighted there were only 48 stores within the mall that still had a tenant leaving 62 spaces vacant. Other remaining tenants and managers had raised concerns about leaving the mall due to losing the two remaining major anchor stores. Moonbeam put the property up for sale for $4 million in August 2017 but took the listing off the market in October 2018 due to lack of interest.

In September 2018, Virginia College announced they would close the Cortana location in July 2019 as part of a nationwide downsizing. The campus closed at the end of 2018 when the college folded.

By December 2017, the Dillard's outlet permanently closed the mall entrance. As of April 2018, the mall had about 40 occupied stores, which continued to dwindle. As of May 2019, the mall's inline tenets consisted of three jewelers, a hair salon, Bath & Body Works, a Philly cheesesteak grill, a church, a theatrical studio, and a small medical clinic among its inline tenants, with over 90% of the available properties and five anchors vacant.

By the end of July 2019, Bath and Body Works closed, and the remaining tenants were ordered to vacate the premises by September 15, 2019. The last remaining tenants were a USPS branch, a distribution center by the local Junior League, and a nurse practitioner clinic, and the mall was closed to mall walkers after September 3. The Baton Rouge Business Report stated there is a possible deal that Amazon may move their distribution center operations to the mall. It was later confirmed in November that Amazon planned to buy the mall, as well as the former Macy's and Virginia College buildings, and build a new distribution center.

On January 11, 2021, it was announced that Dillard's Clearance Center would be closing on May 2, 2021, which would leave the mall completely vacant. Demolition of the mall began at the former Mervyn’s on March 22, 2021, and was completed in late summer of 2021. In December 2021, the site underwent redevelopment into a distribution center for Amazon. The Amazon distribution center, also known as BTR1 opened in 2024 at a cost of $200 million. The new Amazon distribution center has had a massive economic impact on the city of Baton Rouge.
