= Mall of Louisiana =

Shopping mall in Baton Rouge, Louisiana

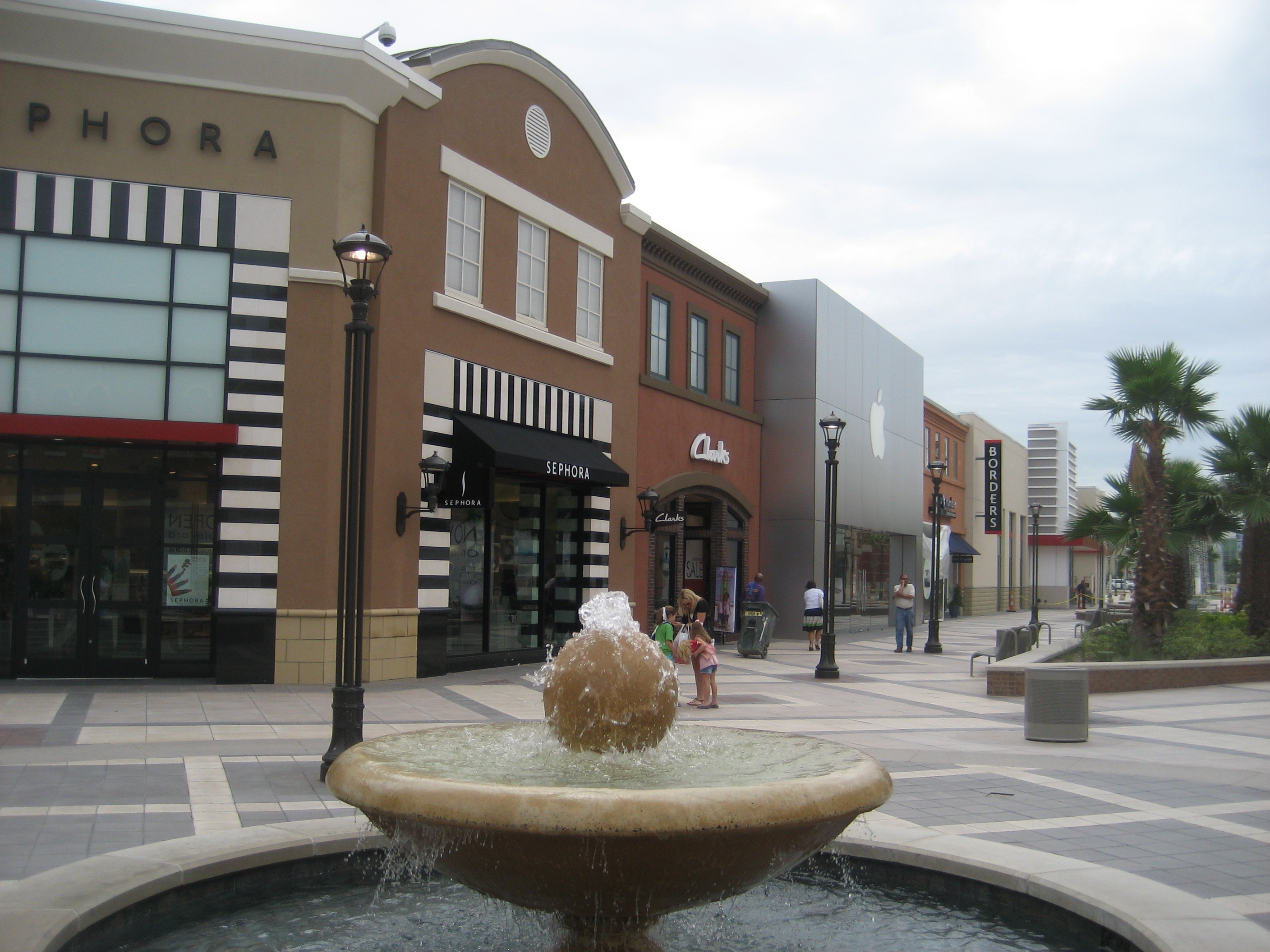
- The Boulevard, an extension to the mall
- Location: Baton Rouge, Louisiana, United States
- Coordinates: 30.3893°N 91.088°W
- Opened: 1997; 29 years ago
- Renovated: 2008
- Developer: Jim Wilson & Associates
- Manager: GGP
- Owner: GGP
- Architect: Crawford McWilliams Hatcher
- Num. of stores: 180
- Num. of anchor tenants: 6
- Floor area: 1,558,834 sq ft (144,820.4 m^{2})
- Floors: 2
- Website: www.malloflouisiana.com

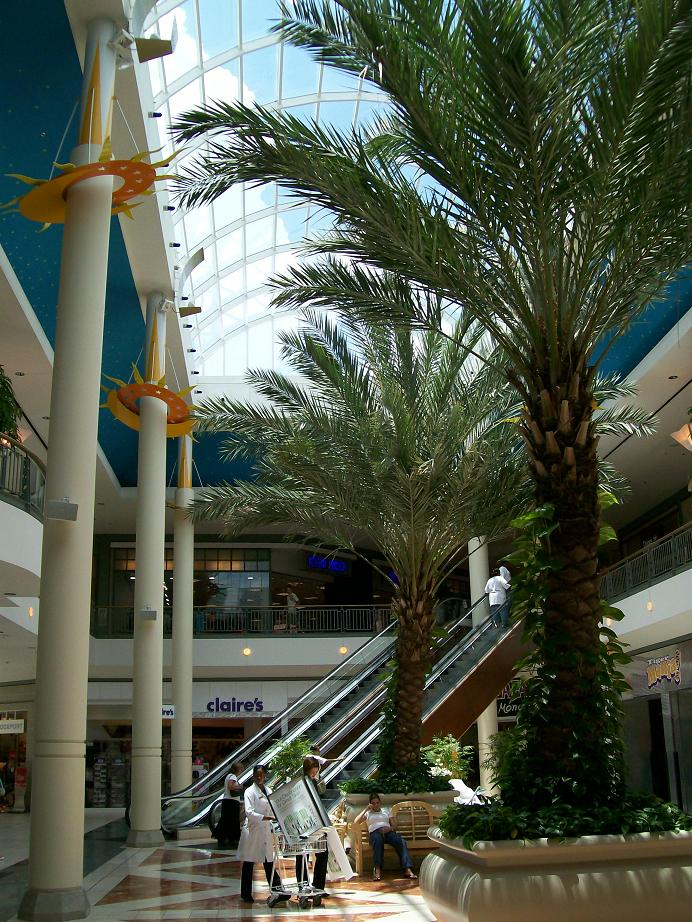

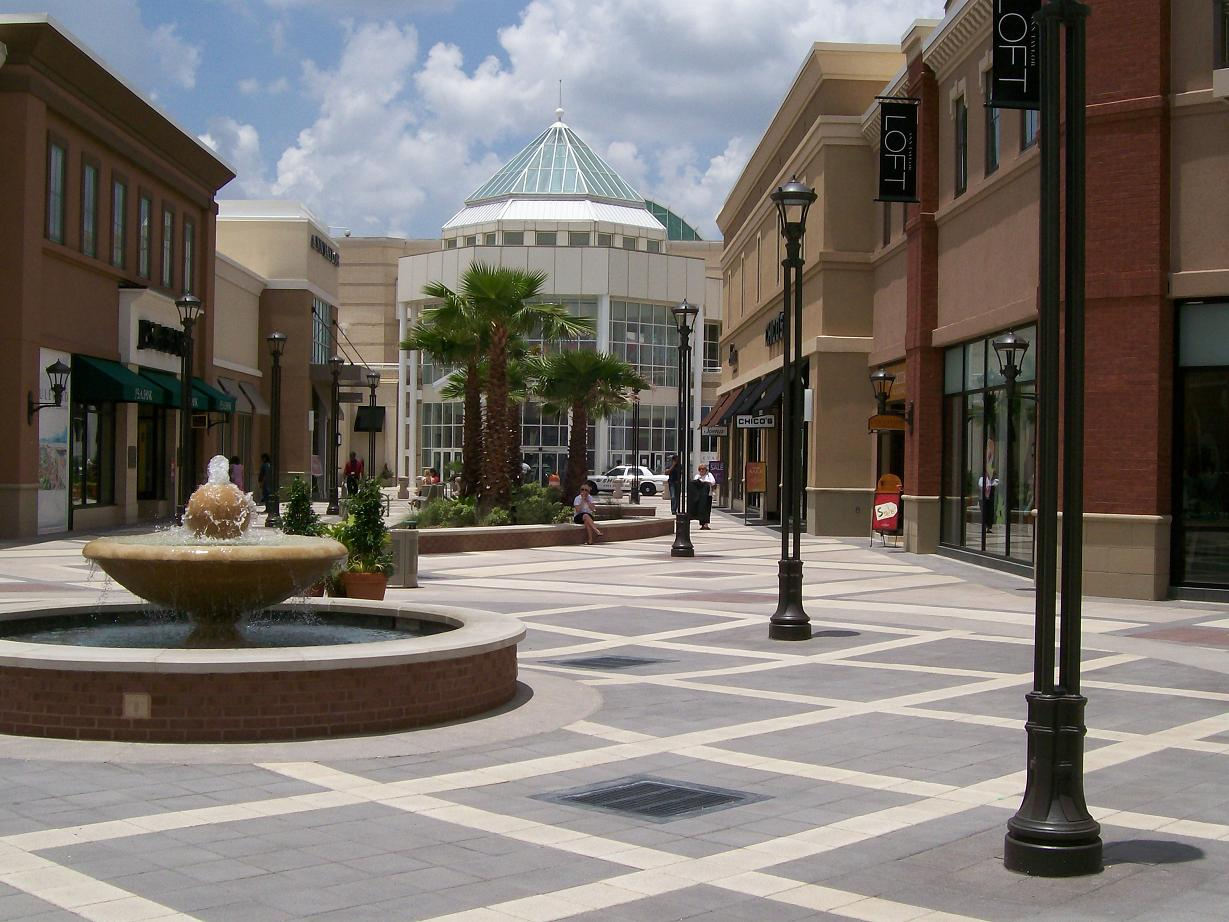
The Boulevard and main mall entrance

The Mall of Louisiana is a mid-scale shopping mall in Baton Rouge, Louisiana, between I-10 and Bluebonnet Blvd. It is the largest mall in Louisiana. It is the only regional mall in Baton Rouge. The anchor stores are two Dillard's stores, Dick’s House of Sport, Main Event Entertainment, JCPenney, and Macy's.

The Boulevard is an unenclosed area of the mall that opened in 2008.

== History ==
The mall was built and opened in 1997. Its original anchors were Dillard's, McRae's, Sears, JCPenney, and Maison Blanche. The mall was developed by Jim Wilson & Associates.

The Maison Blanche store was short-lived. It closed a year later and was replaced by Parisian which only lasted until 2001.

In 2003, Foley's opened at the former Maison Blanche/Parisian store. On September 9, 2006, Foley's rebranded as Macy's.

In November 2005, Dillard's acquired the McRae's store at the mall from Belk. That store would become a Dillard's Men, Children, and Home.

On July 21, 2006, Rave Motion Pictures opened a 15-screen movie theater adjacent to the mall. In June 2013, the movie theater was acquired by AMC Theatres.

In 2008, an unenclosed area called The Boulevard and a 10-tenant power center were constructed as additions to the mall.

Nordstrom Rack opened a 30,000 square foot store in the mall in 2015. In March 2017, H. H. Gregg closed its store at the mall. In November 2017, Smashburger announced plans to open a location in the mall.

In January 2018, Banana Republic and Gap closed stores in the mall. In June of that year, Main Event Entertainment announced plans to open a location in the mall in the space formerly occupied by H. H. Gregg. In November, H&M announced plans to open a store in the former Gap locations.

On February 12, 2021, it was announced that Sears would be closing as part of a plan to close 32 stores nationwide. The store closed on May 2 that same year. This was the last Sears store in Louisiana.

A Blue Zoo aquarium opened on April 1, 2021. On Tuesday, July 6, 2021, a 12-foot-long Burmese python named Cara escaped from her enclosure there. The search for her concluded when she was found inside the walls of the mall early in the morning on July 8.

In 2025, Dick’s Sporting Goods announced they were planning on opening one of their large format Dick’s House of Sport locations on May 16, 2025, in the former Sears. Dick’s Sporting Goods bought the former Sears and converted it into a two-story store with 100,000 square feet of retail space. The store relocated to the former Sears from a nearby location east of the mall due to the new location being larger in size.

=== 2026 shooting ===
On April 23, 2026, a mass shooting occurred inside the mall, leaving 17-year-old Martha Odom dead and five others injured. Odom was a student at Ascension Episcopal School, and was visiting the mall with her friends as part of "senior skip day." Police reported that two groups had confronted one another in the food court, escalating into a shooting. Bystanders, including Odom and two other students from her school, were among the injured and five suspects were taken into custody. The shooting garnered national attention, occurring just four days after eight people were killed in a shooting in Shreveport.

== Current Anchors ==
Dillard’s Women (1997-Present)

Dillard’s Men (2005-Present)

Dick’s House of Sport (2025-Present)

Macy’s (2006-Present)

JCPenney (1997-Present)

Main Event Entertainment (2019-Present)

== Former Anchors ==
Sears (1997-2021)

McRae’s (1997-2005)

Maison Blanche (1997-1998)

Foley’s (2003-2006)

Parisian (1998-2001)
