= Main Event Entertainment =

American family entertainment center chain

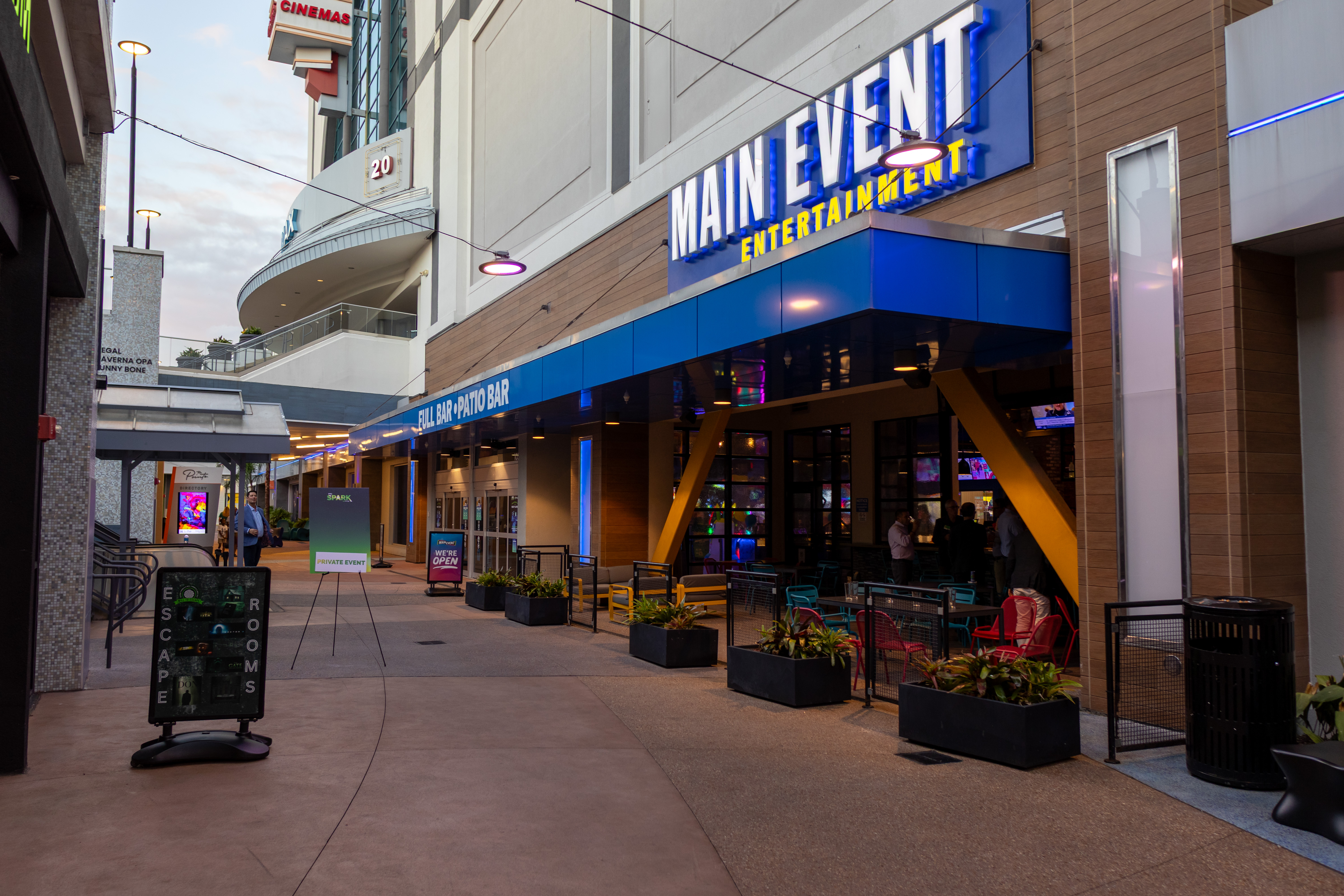
- Main Event in Orlando, Florida
- Type: Subsidiary
- Industry: Family entertainment centers
- Founded: 1998; 28 years ago
- Founders: Neil Hupfauer; David Smith
- Headquarters: Coppell, Texas, United States
- Number of locations: 64
- Area served: United States
- Key people: Tarun Yal (CEO); Darin Harper (CFO); Rob Viveros (COO)
- Owner: RedBird Capital Partners (24.2%; 2020–2022)
- Parent: Ardent Leisure (100%; 2006-2020, 75.8%; 2020-2022); Dave & Buster's (2022–present)
- Website: mainevent.com

Main Event Entertainment is an American chain of family entertainment centers (FECs). The company was formerly headquartered in Plano, Texas, before being sold to their former competitor Dave & Buster’s in 2022. Main Event currently operates 58 locations in 20 states, predominantly in Texas and the Southern United States, and features attractions and features such as bowling alleys, arcades, laser tag, virtual reality games, gravity rope courses, miniature golf, billiards, escape rooms, karaoke and a restaurant under the name of Family Kitchen at all of their locations.

Main Event was founded in 1998 by Neil Hupfauer and David Smith. The company became a subsidiary of Ardent Leisure in 2006 before its acquisition by competitor Dave & Buster’s in June 2022. Main Event now operates as a family entertainment brand and separately owned unit of the more adult-oriented Dave & Buster's chain.

== History ==
Main Event was founded in 1998 by Neil Hupfauer and David Smith. Ardent Leisure, an Australian company, acquired it from the founders in 2006.

In 2018, Chris Morris replaced Charlie Keegan as president and CEO of the company.

In June 2020, Ardent Leisure sold a 24.2% stake in the company to RedBird Capital Partners.

In March 2022, Ardent Leisure acquired Summit Entertainment Centers, a Colorado-based FEC chain with locations in Windsor, Thornton, and Colorado Springs. All three locations were converted to Main Event, joining its existing location in Denver.

On April 6, 2022, Dave & Buster's announced its intent to acquire Main Event for $835 million, with Main Event's CEO Chris Morris becoming the chief executive of the combined company. Outgoing interim CEO Kevin Sheehan considered Main Event to be complementary to the main Dave & Buster's chain, citing that the two chains were positioned towards different demographics (families and young adults respectively), and that Main Event had a focus on larger-scale activities and attractions. The acquisition was completed in June 2022; Sheehan, who became chairman at that time, stated that larger Dave & Buster's locations could be converted to Main Event to take better advantage of their floorspace, and be supplanted by D&B locations with a smaller footprint in the same market.

== Operations ==
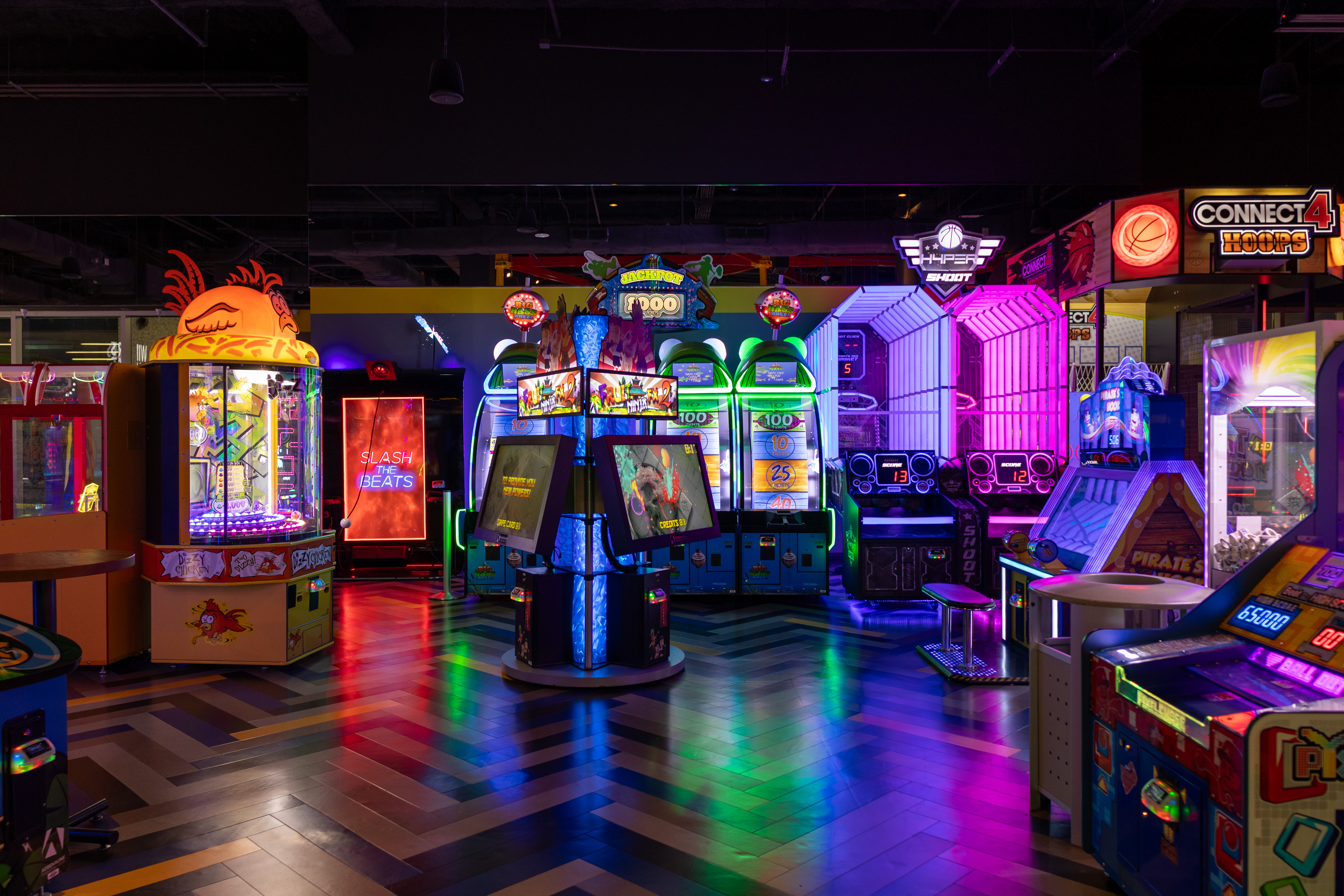
Main Event arcade

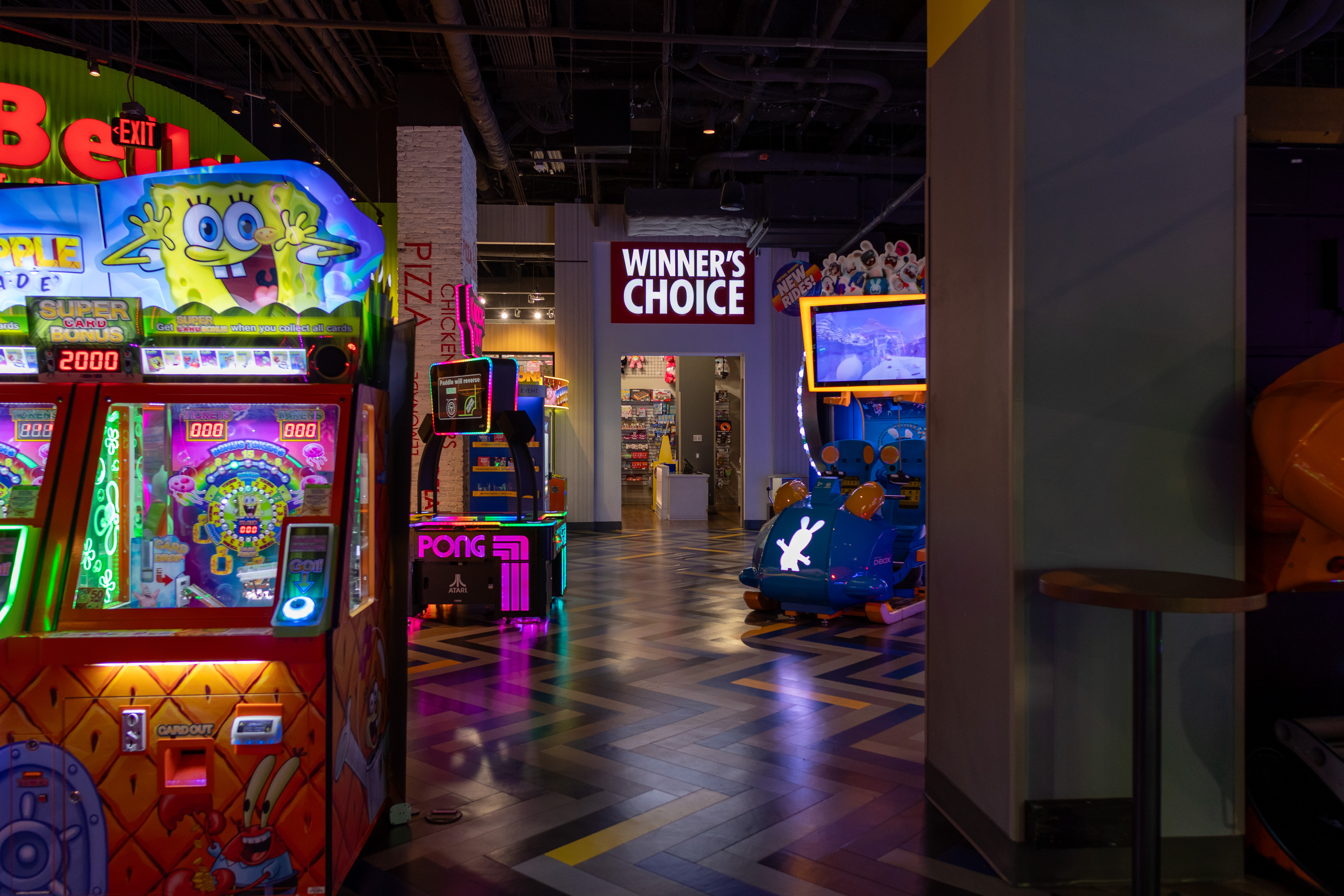
Winner's Choice prize store

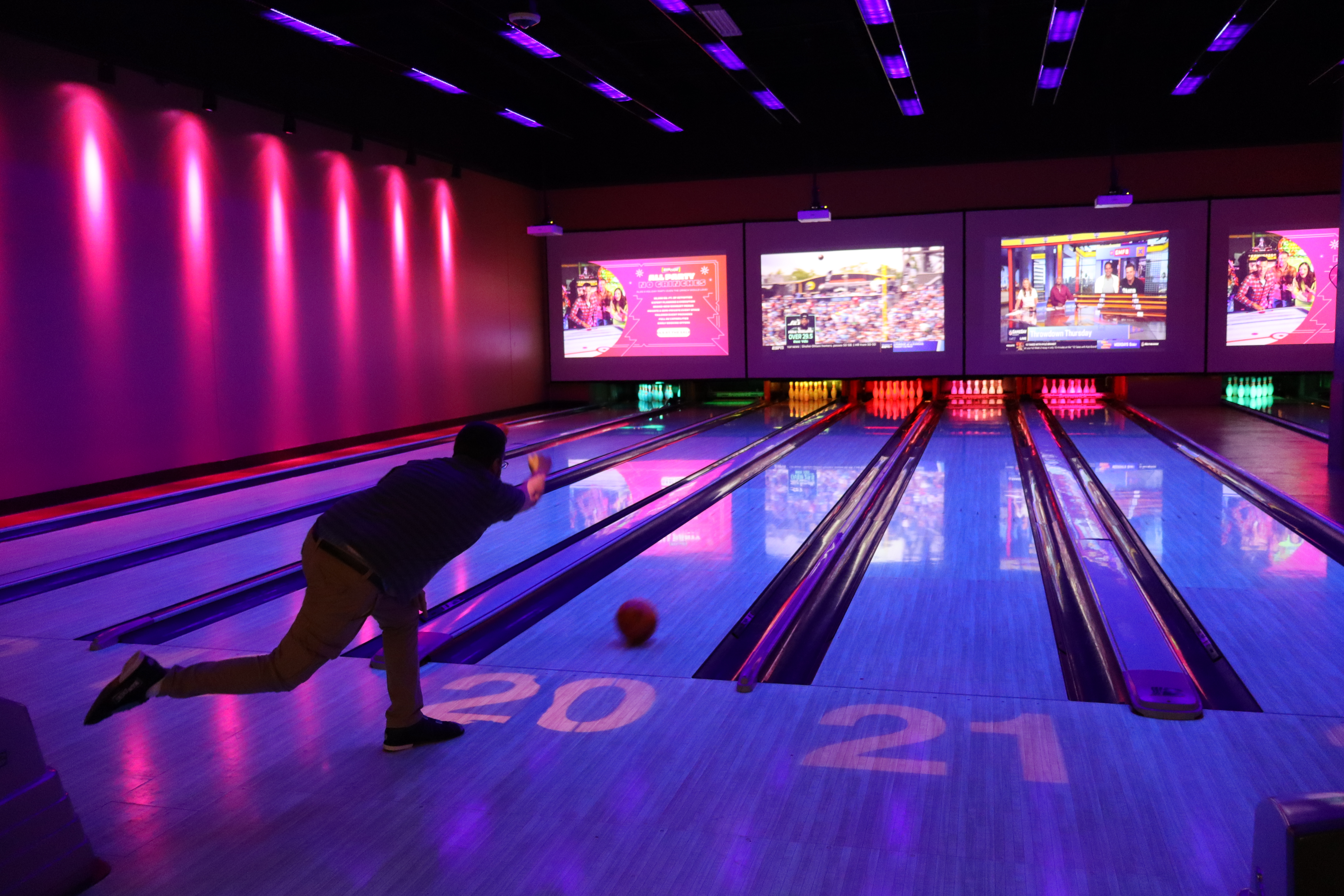
A bowling game in progress at the Main Event Entertainment in Stafford, Texas

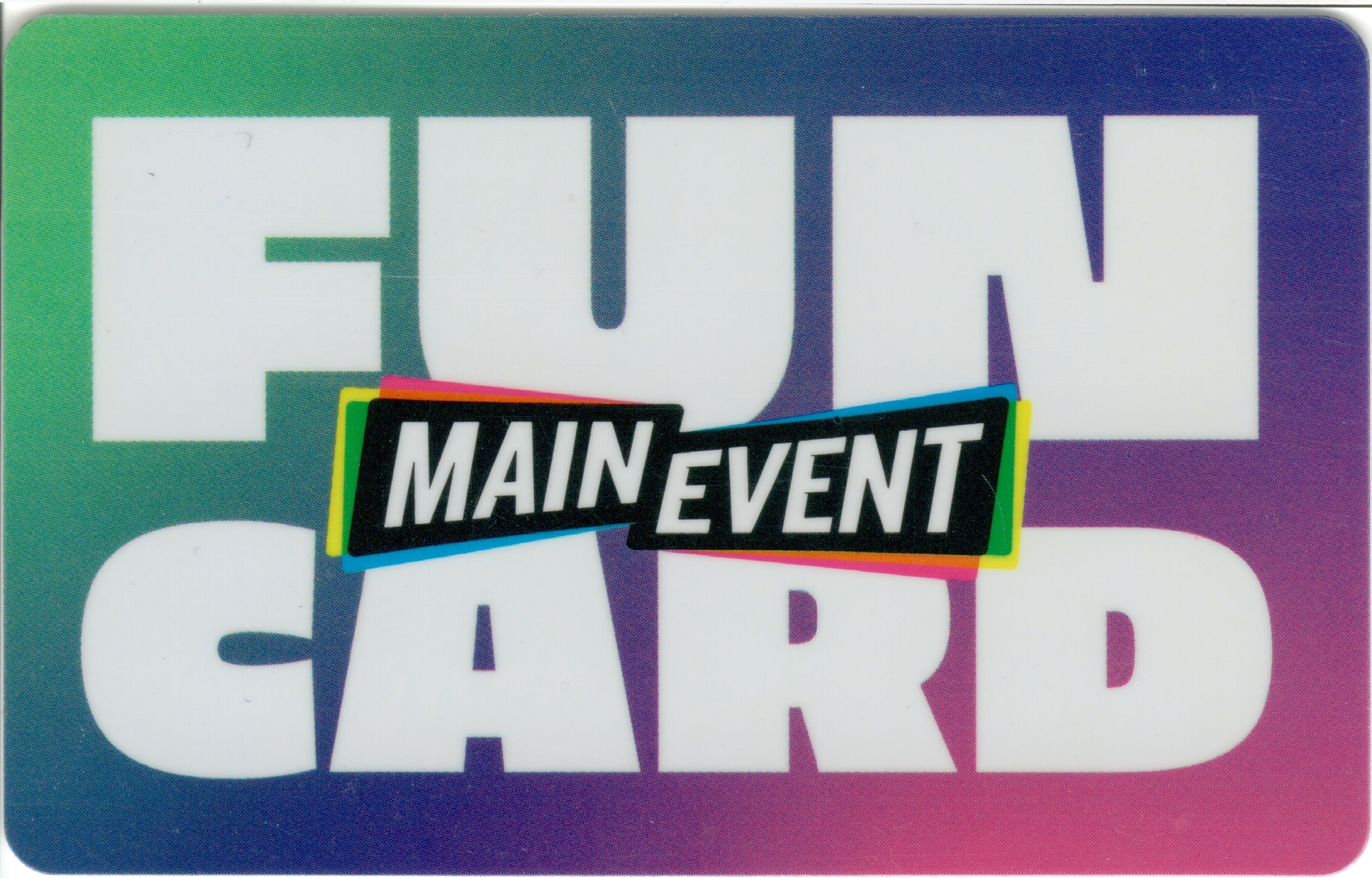
A Main Event arcade game card, known as a "Fun Card".

Main Event Entertainment operates family entertainment centers which feature billiards, bowling, arcade games, virtual reality games, laser tag, miniature golf, gravity ropes course, and karaoke. Main Event offers facilities and services for birthday parties. The company also provides food and beverage, as well as meeting and event space with accommodations for corporate meetings or group gatherings; and event facility rental services.

Each Main Event location offers full restaurant services under the name Family Kitchen, with items like appetizers, pizza, hamburgers, salads, and unique desserts. Each location also has a full-service bar, serving beer, wine, mixed drinks, and a bar menu.

Despite having a generally more family-oriented target demographic, Main Event has adopted the same policies as Dave & Buster’s, where individuals under the age of 18 or 21 (varies by location) may only enter the premises with a guardian who is at least 25 years of age, the latter of whom is strictly required to only bring a maximum of six (6) underage patrons in the same party. Certain locations, regardless of whether they are branded as a D&B or Main Event, have a strict curfew policy which requires patrons under the age of 21 to vacate the premises by 11 p.m. on Friday and Saturday evenings.

== See also ==
- Chuck E. Cheese
