= John A. Brown (department store) =

Oklahoma department store chain

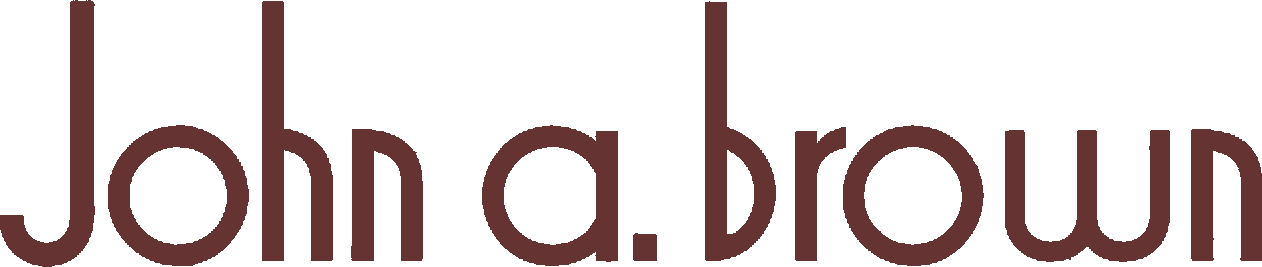
- Type: Department store
- Industry: Retail
- Founded: 1932; 94 years ago
- Founder: John A. Brown and John H. Dunkin
- Defunct: 1984; 42 years ago
- Fate: Acquired by Dillard's
- Headquarters: Oklahoma City, Oklahoma, US

John A. Brown was an Oklahoma department store chain. It operated under that name from 1932, when its founder bought out its predecessor and renamed the chain for himself. After Mr. Brown died in 1940, his widow took over management until her own death in 1967, forcing a change in ownership. Dayton-Hudson, another retail company, continued operating the chain under the Brown name, until 1984, when Dayton-Hudson sold the Brown chain to Dillard's, another national chain, which combined all of the Brown stores under its own name. The flagship store on West Main Street was closed in 1974 and was subsequently razed as part of an urban renewal project. The project was supposed to result in a new shopping center known as the Galleria. However, the project was never completed, so the Brown chain never returned to downtown.

== History ==
The department store had its start in 1915, when the Rorabaugh Company acquired Brock's Dry Goods in Oklahoma City, and changed its name to Rorabaugh-Brown Dry Goods Co. (Note: Actually, the John A. Brown chain could be said to have begun in 1901, when Mitscher-Mitchell Dry Goods Company opened a store on the south side of West Main Street in downtown Oklahoma City. The store did so well that the company expanded to two buildings on the north side of West Main by February 1904. The source of this information quotes an article from the February 3, 1904 issue of the Oklahoman newspaper that led to the conclusion that the new Brock's properties were the same ones later occupied by the John A. Brown chain.) when John Albert Brown bought the business from his cousin and partner, A. O. Rorabaugh in 1932 and named the store after himself.

After founder and owner, John A. Brown, died in 1940, his widow, Della Dunkin Brown, took over as CEO. She died in 1967, and ownership of the company passed to a trust. By that time, retail competition had greatly intensified, and was moving from large downtown stores to smaller stores in suburban shopping malls. The John A. Brown company was acquired by the Dayton Hudson Corporation (now Target Corporation) in 1971, and continued to operate under the John A. Brown name. The downtown store closed and was demolished in 1977. The chain was acquired by Dillard's in 1984. The six Brown stores were quickly renamed as Dillard's. The store's original location was in downtown Oklahoma City, and opened in the 1930s. Its location was bounded by Harvey and Robinson on the west and east, and Park and Main on the north and south. A book about Brown's, and the other main downtown Oklahoma City department stores, Kerr's and Halliburton's, was released in 2016 under the title "John A. Brown's, Kerr's, and Halliburton's: Where Oklahoma City Loved to Shop." The book was written by local historians Ajax Delvecki and Larry Johnson.

The company also operated many other stores throughout Oklahoma. These include locations that are either stand alone or in outdoor shopping centers, such as one at Campus Corner in Norman and one in Oklahoma City's Capitol Hill neighborhood. The chain opened stores in enclosed shopping malls in its later years, including Quail Springs Mall 1980-1985 (demolished 2017), Penn Square Mall 1960-1984 (still operating as Dillard's), and Crossroads Mall in Oklahoma City 1974-1985, as well as Woodland Hills Mall, Utica Square and Promenade Mall in Tulsa.

== Brown-Dunkin store ==
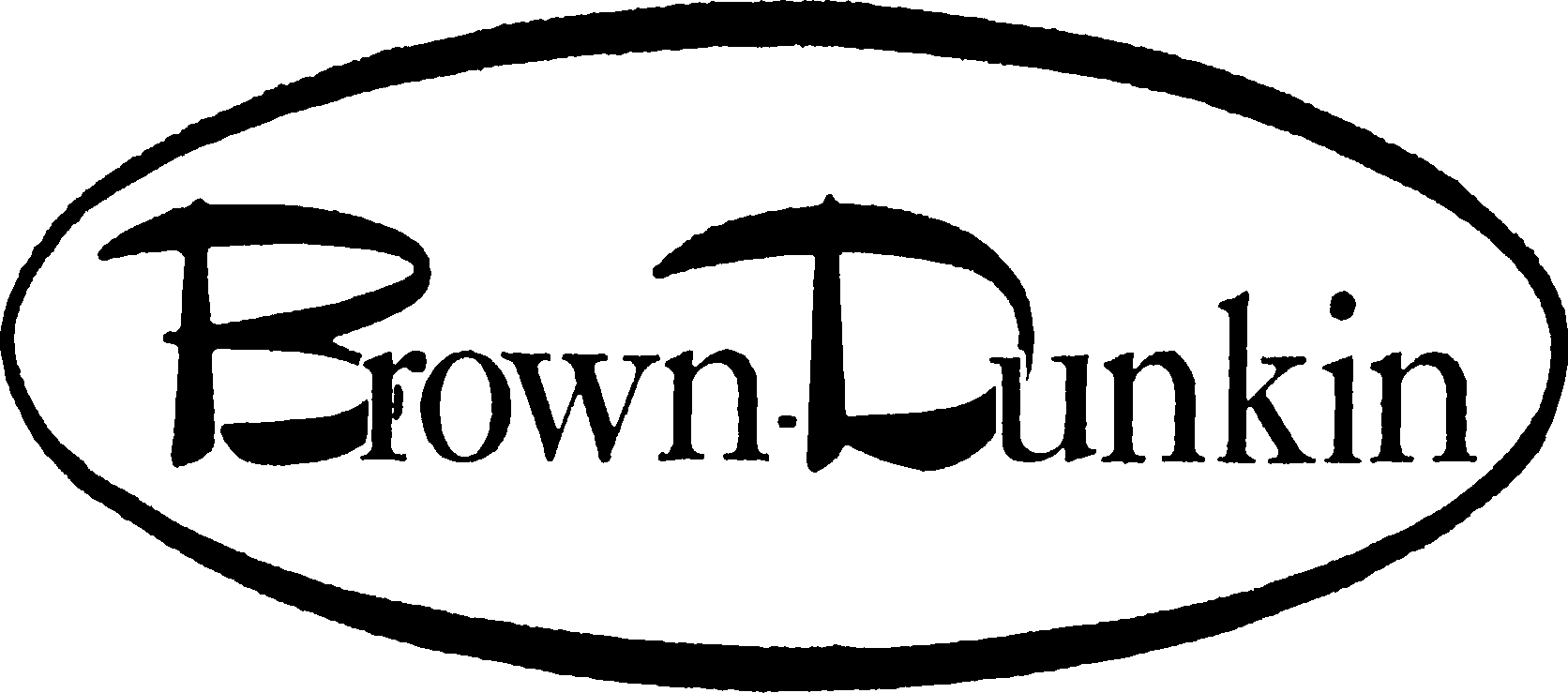
Brown-Dunkin Logo

John A. Brown and John Dunkin bought Hunts, one of the leading mercantile stores in Tulsa, in 1924. They renamed it Brown-Dunkin. John Dunkin moved from Oklahoma City to Tulsa to operate the store. However, B-D was an entity of its own and there was no formal connection with the Oklahoma City company.

In 1959, a director of the First National Bank of St. Louis, asked Willard Dillard, owner of the Dillard's department store chain, to consider buying Brown-Dunkin. Dillard raised $350,000 (~$2.91 million in 2025) and bought Brown-Dunkin in February, 1960.
