= Penn Square Mall =

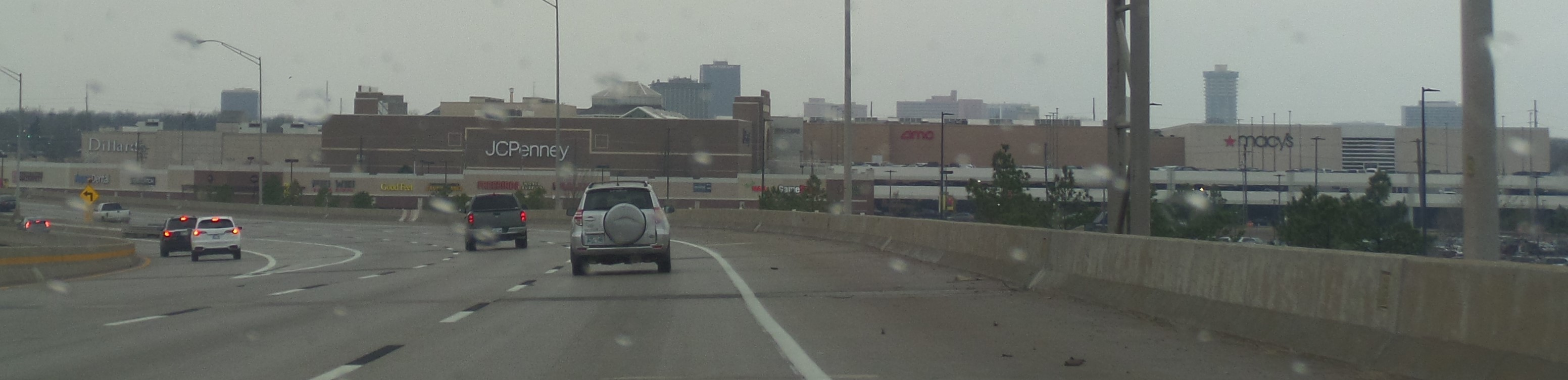
- Penn Square Mall as seen from Interstate 44
- Location: Oklahoma City, Oklahoma, U.S.
- Coordinates: 35°31′29″N 97°32′40″W
- Opened: 1960
- Manager: Simon Property Group
- Owner: Simon Property Group (94.5%)
- Num. of stores: 145
- Num. of anchor tenants: 5
- Floor area: 1,083,937 sq ft (100,701 m^{2})
- Floors: 2
- Website: http://www.simon.com/mall/penn-square-mall

Penn Square Mall is a two-story, 1,083,937 sq ft (100,701 m^{2}) regional shopping mall in Oklahoma City, Oklahoma, United States. It is located at the intersection of Pennsylvania Avenue and NW Expressway, near Interstate 44. The mall's anchor stores consist of JCPenney, Macy's, AMC Theatres, and two separate Dillard's stores. Simon Property Group, who manages the mall, owns 94.5% of it. In 2018, the mall generated sales of over $700 per square foot.

== History ==
The center was originally built as an outdoor shopping center in 1960 and spanned 582,000 sq ft (54,070 m^{2}), with anchors John A. Brown and Montgomery Ward.

High-end Park Avenue junior department store Al Rosenthal's opened a branch at the new center. The two-store chain would be rebranded as Gus Mayer (which by then owned it) in 1969, and in 1974 converted to a branch of Kansas City-based Harzfeld's. It closed ten years later in 1984.

After the opening of regional enclosed malls such as Quail Springs Mall and Crossroads Mall, the center was enclosed in 1982 and renovated in 1988 to include a second level and food court at a cost of $100 million. A multi-story parking structure was added and the mall was further expanded with a new JCPenney in 1995. It was renovated once again five years later in 2000.

Penn Square Mall was the site of Penn Square Bank, which failed on July 5, 1982, with devastating effects on the US banking industry.

In 2000, a shopping center named Belle Isle Station opened next to Penn Square Mall. It featured several retail stores such as Walmart Supercenter, Old Navy, Linens 'n Things, Babies R Us, Shoe Carnival and Ross Dress for Less. Linens 'n Things went bankrupt in the late 2000s. On September 12, 2013, Nordstrom Rack opened in its place. In March 2018, it was announced that Babies R Us would close permanently after Toys R Us filed for bankruptcy. The year after, it was replaced by REI and Five Below.

John A. Brown was sold to Dillard's in 1984. In 2001, Dillard's expanded its presence following the closure of the Montgomery Ward store by opening a second location in the space that Montgomery Ward vacated. Foley's, part of the mall's 1988 expansion, converted to Macy's in 2006.

On September 19, 2006, The Cheesecake Factory opened outside the mall.

On September 15, 2018, The Container Store opened in the parking lot.
