= National Gridiron League (United States) =

Proposed indoor football league

- Sport: Football
- Founded: 2017
- Founder: Joe E. McClendon, III
- President: Joe E. McClendon, III
- Divisions: Eastern Conference, Western Conference
- No. of teams: 8
- Country: United States

The National Gridiron League (NGL) was a proposed gridiron football league. In 2022, after three years of postponed seasons, the organization rebranded as the United Football League (UFL), prior to the current UFL (formed from the merger of the 2020s USFL and XFL leagues). In 2024, the NGL resurfaced to claim to be launching in 2025.

A number of cases in the past and multiple seasons cancellation have raised questions about whether this is a legitimate league or a scam and the United Football Players Association had warned prospective players from signing with the league. As of April 2025, no games have actually been held and the only activities were tryouts which charged potential players to participate.

Prior to the postponed 2019 season, the league logo used was a near copy of the former United Football League, while many of the team names and logos are also copies of former football teams.

== History ==
=== National Gridiron League (2018–2021) ===
Initially the league announced that it had planned to start play as an indoor football league in spring 2019, with 12 teams aligned in two divisions starting on March 30, 2019, and conclude with the inaugural Gridiron Bowl game on August 10, 2019, in Biloxi, Mississippi. However, the league pushed back the announced start of the inaugural season to May 2019 amid reports the league had not had finalized leases for many of its teams.

By April 2, team coaches informed the players the season was canceled as the league was not going to be able to honor their original contracts and that none of the team staff or coaches had ever been paid. League chairman Joe McClendon announced the following day that league had postponed its inaugural season to 2020 citing organizational changes in personnel and the suspension of operations of the Alliance of American Football. Its personnel later sued the league over their claims of non-payment for their work.

The league continued pursuits of a 2020 season including announcing player signings and scheduled Organized Team Activities (OTAs) for January 24–26, 2020. However, all OTAs were canceled the evening of January 24 after players had started arriving. The league then announced that teams would be allowed to play outdoors. The 2020 season was postponed amidst the COVID-19 pandemic.

The league originally announced a 2021 schedule with all games to be held outdoors as a traditional spring league. On January 31, 2021, the league announced it would play all games at single location, without confirming the site, with a planned start date of April 10. It was pushed back again to May 1 with the season to take place in Fort Wayne, Indiana, at an unannounced venue. As of April 2021, no venue in Fort Wayne was ever secured.

On April 10, 2021, Joe McClendon and several others showed up to protest at the Glenbrook Square mall in Fort Wayne claiming the city is not holding up to the agreed deal to aid the players in providing hotel accommodations. The players had been told the city would cover the costs of their hotel bills, but had been given notice to evacuate their rooms the morning of April 10 when the rates had not been paid. The city of Fort Wayne responded that they had never made any commitments or arrangements with the league at all, they had only had a few meetings with McClendon to point him where to look for community engagement, venues, and lodging. On April 12, the city then stated they would have no further discussion for a partnership with the league.

On the evening of April 12, McClendon met with the players in the hotel conference room where they were staying and told them the Fort Wayne event was cancelled and they would not be getting any aid in paying for the rooms from the city or the league. A player then physically attacked McClendon over being stranded in the city and frauded out of the tryout fees, travel, and accommodation rates. McClendon insisted there would still be a 2021 season, but in a different city and claims the league must play this year due to taking out a PPP loan that must be used. He also stated that when Visit Fort Wayne, the city's visitor bureau, had contacted him about having the season in the city, that they would provide lodging in the city. Visit Fort Wayne countered with saying they had only agreed to find rooms for the players, not pay for them, but that they would advocate with the local hotels for lower rates.

=== UFL rebrand ===
In August 2021, a new website was created under the name United Football League (UFL), stating it is a continuation of two former leagues of the same name (the UFL from the 1960s and the unrelated UFL that operated from 2009 to 2012) and that it had purchased the teams from the now-defunct NGL. However, the new league is a rebrand of the same organization behind the NGL, including still having occasional references to itself as the National Gridiron League within the new website left over the web address move. It originally proposed a 2022 season with many of the 11 of the 12 teams from the NGL, but the season was postponed to April 2023 with 14 proposed teams. Players were charged $75 to participate in a league tryouts. The UFL plans to play an 8-on-8 football in a modular-built stadiums. In February 2023 it was reported that the construction plans for football stadium next to Oklahoma City's Crossroads Mall have been halted after McClendon didn't pay $10,000 deposit that was part of the lease agreement.

In February 2023 the league announced that training camp will start on March 31, 2023, with the season starting on April 22, and published the teams rosters. On March they announced the league will launch an exclusive streaming subscription service called UFL+ and also announced they will hold an "annual UFL Semi-Pro Draft". The season start would later be delayed to May 13. On May 15 the league announced that they are launching a new "Player Development Program", with players paying $1,000 for the opportunity to practice with the league teams, and in turn will expand the roster and allow unlimited number of players on each team. On June 15, 2023 - well after the planned starting date - the league announced they will cancel the 2023 season and will hold "team scrimmages" instead, "as the league works to promote team brands and develop sponsorships in each market for a start in 2024". As of December 2023, no such scrimmages were held. Players were promised a salary of $50,000 a year, while head coaches were promised $65,000.

In July 2023, an article in CBS6 Richmond revealed that McClendon never established any venue contracts or paid any of the contracted players or coaches prior to changing his phone number. The Richmond Iron Horses' head coach was quoted: "It's a whole hoax. It's a fraud. It's called you fooling me league, that's what it is."

By December 2023, a different United Football League—a group backed by Fox Corporation, Dany Garcia, Dwayne Johnson and RedBird Capital Partners—laid claim to the UFL name and brand.

=== National Gridiron League (2024-) ===
In 2024 the operation returned to the National Gridiron League brand, with announced plans to launch an 18-team league in March 2025. They later announced it will start the inaugural 2025 season in April with only 8 of its 18 teams playing this season and additional teams will be added in 2026. Later, the Montgomery Generals replaced the Oklahoma City Owls in the schedule and the Mississippi Mud Cats were moved to the western division. The Gridiron Bowl I was announced to be hosted in Atlanta in August, 2024. Sometime in early 2025, home venues were announced for the 8 main teams. On June 28, 2025 - the NGL announced instead of playing a full season, they would shift into a showcase format. At this time, the National Gridiron League website, along with all of the team websites, are offline. The National Gridiron League Facebook page has not been updated since February 2025. The league is considered defunct.

== Teams ==
=== Announced 2019 teams ===
As of February 21, 2019. Cities in italics were locations identified by the league website, but no leases for an arena were confirmed to have been signed in the listed location. Since the postponement, all arena references on the league website have been removed and most coaches have either been changed or moved on to other leagues.

| Team | Location | Arena | Head coach | Founded |
Eastern Conference
| Georgia Wildcats | Albany, Georgia | Albany Civic Center | Santo Stephens | 2018 |
| Indiana Blue Bombers | Fort Wayne, Indiana | Allen County War Memorial Coliseum | Kelvin Kinney | 2018 |
| Indiana Firebirds | Evansville, Indiana | Ford Center | Nick Hart | 2018 |
| Pennsylvania Pioneers | Wilkes-Barre, Pennsylvania | Mohegan Sun Arena at Casey Plaza | Ryan Lingenfelder | 2018 |
| Virginia Destroyers | Hampton, Virginia | Hampton Coliseum | Durwood Roquemore | 2018 |
| Virginia Iron Horses | Roanoke, Virginia | Berglund Center | Jermaine Hampton | 2018 |
Western Conference
| Arkansas Twisters | Little Rock, Arkansas | Verizon Arena | Matt Diniak | 2018 |
| Baton Rouge Redsticks | Baton Rouge, Louisiana | Raising Cane's River Center | Damon Mason | 2018 |
| Kansas Kapitals | Topeka, Kansas | Kansas Expocentre | Carlos Cavanaugh | 2018 |
| Mississippi Mudcats | Jackson, Mississippi | Mississippi Coliseum | B. J. Cohen | 2018 |
| Saint Louis Stampede | St. Charles, Missouri | Family Arena | Pat Pimmel (Note: Resigned in 2019.) | 2018 |
| Texas Bighorns | Beaumont, Texas | Ford Arena | Josh Bush | 2018 |

=== 2020 teams ===
As of March 26, 2020. No home venues were confirmed to have been signed in any listed locations although they were listed on the posted schedule.

| Division | Team | Location | Venue | Head coach |
Eastern Conference
| North | Dayton Firebirds | Dayton, Ohio | Roger Glass Stadium | Quentin Jones (Note: Nick Hart resigned in 2020.) |
| North | Indiana Blue Bombers | Fort Wayne, Indiana | Bishop John M. D'Arcy Stadium | Micheal Coleman |
| North | Pittsburgh Pioneers | Greensburg, Pennsylvania | Hempfield Area Stadium | Vacant |
| South | Atlanta Wildcats | Clarkston, Georgia | James R. Hallford Stadium | Julius Gant |
| South | Virginia Beach Destroyers | Virginia Beach, Virginia | Virginia Beach Sportsplex Stadium | Vacant |
| South | Virginia Iron Horses | Salem, Virginia | Salem Football Stadium | Jermaine Hampton |
Western Conference
| North | Arkansas Twisters | Little Rock, Arkansas | War Memorial Stadium | Matt Diniak |
| North | Kansas City Kapitals | Kansas City, Missouri | Kansas City Municipal Auditorium | Adrian Perez |
| North | Saint Louis Stampede | Sauget, Illinois | GCS Credit Union Ballpark | Jeffery Hunt |
| South | Baton Rouge Redsticks | Baker, Louisiana | Baker Stadium | B. J. Cohen |
| South | Houston Bighorns | Cypress, Texas | Cy-Fair FCU Stadium | Jerrian James |
| South | Mississippi Mudcats | Jackson, Mississippi | Mississippi Veterans Memorial Stadium | Christopher Parker |

=== 2021 ===
Original outdoor venues were listed on the league ticket purchasing website, but were not confirmed by any of the venues themselves. Later plans were for a single-site season in Fort Wayne, Indiana.

| Division | Team | Location | Venue | Head coach |
Eastern Conference
| North | Indiana Blue Bombers | Fort Wayne, Indiana | Fred Zollner Memorial Stadium | Micheal Coleman |
| North | Louisville Firebirds (Note: Since the postponing of the 2020 season, the Dayton Firebirds were listed as the Louisville Firebirds as of August 2020.) | Jeffersonville, Indiana | Jeffersonville High School | Devin Redd |
| North | Pittsburgh Pioneers | Pittsburgh, Pennsylvania | George K. Cupples Stadium | Quentin Jones |
| South | Atlanta Wildcats | Jonesboro, Georgia | Hines Ward Field at Tara Stadium | Julius Gant |
| South | Virginia Beach Destroyers | Virginia Beach, Virginia | Virginia Beach Sportsplex | Tim Medlin |
| South | Virginia Iron Horses | Salem, Virginia | Salem Football Stadium | Jermaine Hampton |
Western Conference
| North | Arkansas Twisters | Little Rock, Arkansas | War Memorial Stadium | Ryan Yarborough |
| North | Kansas City Kapitals | North Kansas City, Missouri | North Kansas City High School | Adrian Perez |
| North | Saint Louis Stampede | Sauget, Illinois | GCS Ballpark | Vacant |
| South | Baton Rouge Redsticks | Baton Rouge, Louisiana | BREC Memorial Stadium | B. J. Cohen |
| South | Houston Bighorns | Webster, Texas | Challenger Columbia Stadium | Jerrian James |
| South | Mississippi Mudcats | Jackson, Mississippi | Smith–Wills Stadium | Christopher Parker |

=== 2022 ===
Listed members of the United Football League as of September 18, 2021. There were no listed venues for any of the teams.

| Division | Team | Location |
|---|---|---|
| Central | Arkansas Twisters | Little Rock, Arkansas |
| Central | Baton Rouge Redsticks | Baton Rouge, Louisiana |
| Central | Houston Bighorns | Houston, Texas |
| Mid-West | Chicago Blue Bombers (Note: Listed as a relocation of the former Indiana Blue Bombers.) | Chicago, Illinois |
| Mid-West | Kansas City Kapitals | Kansas City, Missouri |
| Mid-West | Saint Louis Stampede | St. Louis, Missouri |
| North | Pittsburgh Pioneers | Pittsburgh, Pennsylvania |
| North | Richmond Iron Horses (Note: A rename of the former Virginia Iron Horses.) | Richmond, Virginia |
| North | Virginia Beach Destroyers | Virginia Beach, Virginia |
| South | Atlanta Wildcats | Atlanta, Georgia |
| South | Birmingham Steeldawgs | Birmingham, Alabama |
| South | Mississippi Mudcats | Jackson, Mississippi |

=== 2023 ===
Listed members of the United Football League of February 28, 2022. There are no listed venues for any of the teams.

| Conference | Team | Location | Venue | Head coach |
|---|---|---|---|---|
| Eastern | Atlanta Wildcats | Forest Park, Georgia | Kiwanis Stadium | |
| Eastern | Charlestown Pirates | Charleston, South Carolina | John McKissick Field | Jarriel King |
| Eastern | Mississippi Mudcats | Jackson, Mississippi | Mudcats Memorial Stadium | Johnny Loper |
| Eastern | Pittsburgh Pioneers | Pittsburgh, Pennsylvania | George K. Cupples Stadium | Adam Cross |
| Eastern | Richmond Iron Horses | Chesterfield, Virginia | Chesterfield Technical Center Stadium | Douglas Joyner III |
| Eastern | Rochester Firehawks (Note: Originally the Louisville Firebirds) | Rochester, New York | Rochester Community Sports Complex Stadium | Jason Coleman |
| Eastern | Virginia Beach Destroyers | Williamsburg, Virginia | Cooley Field | |
| Western | Arkansas Twisters | Little Rock, Arkansas | Jacksonville High Stadium | Jamie Washington |
| Western | Baton Rouge Redsticks | Gonzales, Louisiana | Lamar Dixon Expo Center | |
| Western | Chicago Blue Bombers | Chicago, Illinois | Vago Field | Theodore Brom |
| Western | Houston Bighorns | Houston, Texas | Cougar Stadium | |
| Western | Kansas City Kapitals | Belton, Missouri | Southwick Stadium | Mick Pettengill |
| Western | Oklahoma City Wranglers | Oklahoma City, Oklahoma | Crossroads Mall | J. D. Runnels |
| Western | Saint Louis Stampede | Cahokia Heights, Illinois | Stampede Stadium | Antwyne Golliday Jr |

=== 2025 ===
Listed members of the National Gridiron League as of 2025. Most of the names were taken from those previously used by Arena Football League and arenafootball2 teams.

| Conference | Team | Location | Venues | Head Coach |
|---|---|---|---|---|
| Eastern | Atlanta Wildcats | Forest Park, Georgia | Kiwanis Stadium at Starr Park | Marty Culpeper |
| Eastern | Charleston Pirates | Ladson, SC | Black Flag Stadium at Coastal Carolina Fair | Otto Riley |
| Eastern | Montgomery Generals | Montgomery, Alabama | Victory Grounds stadium at Garnett Coliseum Grounds | Lamont Fowler |
| Eastern | Tampa Bay Storm | Plant City, Florida | Storm Stadium at Ellis Methvin Sports Complex | James Purnell |
| Western | Arkansas Twisters | Little Rock, Arkansas | Twisters Stadium at Interstate Sports Complex | Brandon Toombs |
| Western | Austin Wranglers | Austin, Texas | The Dust Bowl at Travis County Expo Center | Carlos Garcia |
| Western | Mississippi Mudcats | Brandon, Mississippi | The Catfish Bowl at Shiloh Sports Complex | Jeffery Schaum |
| Western | San Jose SaberCats | San Jose, California | The Den at Alviso Municipal Park | Michael Nash |

=== 2026-2027 ===
Teams potentially joining
| Team | Location | Team | Location |
|---|---|---|---|
| 2026 | | 2027 | |
| Cleveland Gladiators | Cleveland, Ohio | Louisville Firebirds | Louisville, Kentucky |
| Columbus Destroyers | Columbus, Ohio | Portland Roughriders | Portland, Oregon |
| Grand Rapids Rampage | Grand Rapids, Michigan | Rochester Ragin Rams | Rochester, New York |
| Virginia Beach Nighthawks | Virginia Beach, Virginia | Oklahoma City Owls* | Oklahoma City, Oklahoma |
| Wichita Wild | Wichita, Kansas | Utah Blaze | Salt Lake City, Utah |
| Richmond Iron Horse | Richmond, Virginia | | |

*=Originally meant to play in 2025 Season
