= Metroplex =

A metroplex is a conurbation with more than one principal anchor city of near equal importance.

Metroplex may refer to:

- Dallas–Fort Worth metroplex, a conurbation in Texas, U.S.
- Eastgate Metroplex, a professional/retail complex in Tulsa, Oklahoma, U.S.
- Metroplex (record label), a techno record label in Detroit, Michigan, U.S.
- Metroplex (Transformers), the name of several characters in the Transformers franchise
