= John A. Brown =

John A. Brown may refer to:

- John A. Brown Jr. (c. 1962–1997), American murderer executed in Louisiana for the murder of Omer Laughlin
- John A. Brown (died 1940), founder of John A. Brown (department store), Oklahoma-based department store chain
- John Albert Brown (1885–1944), president of Mobil
- John Alf Brown (1881–1936), Welsh international rugby union player
- John Appleton Brown (1844–1902), American painter
- John Arnesby Brown (1866–1955), English footballer and landscape artist

== See also ==
- John Alexander Voules Brown (1852–1945), member of the South Australian House of Assembly
- John Martin Ainley Brown (1928–2005), New Zealand Test match umpire
