= Coastal Carolina Fair =

Annual fair in Ladson, South Carolina, US

Coordinates: 32.9967°N 80.1079°W

The Coastal Carolina Fair, since 1924, is an annual fair that occurs at the Exchange Park Fairgrounds in Ladson, South Carolina. It lasts 11 days beginning on the last Thursday in October with music performances each night. Also, the fair has a variety fair rides.

There are annual exhibits in Creative Arts, Two Flower Shows, Fine Art and Photography Exhibits, and Farm Animals in the Barn. The fair includes vendors in both the Agricultural and Commercial Buildings, and a food fair.

The fair is an all volunteer fundraiser of The Exchange Club of Charleston. The 2013 Coastal Carolina Fair allowed The Exchange Club of Charleston to donate over $800,000 to over 90 non-profit charities in the Low Country of South Carolina.

There was no fair in 2020.

The Charleston Pirates are supposed to be playing at the Black Flag Stadium in the fairgrounds for the 2025 season of the National Gridiron League
