= Jarriel King =

American gridiron football player (born 1987)

No. 77, 61
- Position: Offensive tackle

Personal information
- Born: February 27, 1987 (age 39); North Charleston, South Carolina, U.S.
- Listed height: 6 ft 5 in (1.96 m)
- Listed weight: 321 lb (146 kg)

Career information
- High school: North Charleston
- College: Georgia Military College (2006); South Carolina (2008–2010)
- NFL draft: 2011: undrafted

Career history
- New York Giants (2011)*; Seattle Seahawks (2011); Toronto Argonauts (2013–2015); Saskatchewan Roughriders (2016)
- * Offseason or practice squad member only

Career NFL statistics
- Games played: 1
- Stats at Pro Football Reference
- Stats at CFL.ca

Jarriel King (born February 27, 1987) is an American former professional football player who was an offensive tackle in the National Football League (NFL) and Canadian Football League (CFL). He played college football at Georgia Military College and the University of South Carolina. He signed with the New York Giants after going undrafted in the 2011 NFL draft but was waived before the start of the season. King was then claimed off waivers by the Seattle Seahawks, spending the entire 2011 season on the team's active roster but only playing in one game.

He was waived by the Seahawks in March 2012 after being arrested for criminal sexual conduct. However, he was acquitted of all charges in July 2014. King played in the Canadian Football League (CFL) for the Toronto Argonauts from 2013 to 2015, and for the Saskatchewan Roughriders in 2016. He became a coach after his playing career.

== Early life ==
Jarriel King was born on February 27, 1987, in North Charleston, South Carolina. He did not play football until his freshman year at North Charleston High School. He was both an offensive and defensive lineman on the football team. King recorded 29 pancake blocks on offense and 86 tackles, 4 forced fumbles, and 3 blocked kicks on defense in his senior year (2004), earning first-team All-State honors. He was one of 50 players named to the USA Today Old Spice Red Zone Team.

In the class of 2005, he was rated the 11th-best player in South Carolina by the High School Sports Report and the 22nd-best player in the state by PrepStar. King also participated in track and field in high school and was a regional champion in the shot put. His problems with law and order began in high school when he was arrested twice and convicted of criminal trespassing.

== College career ==
King originally signed with the South Carolina Gamecocks of the University of South Carolina in 2005 but ended up not qualifying academically due to a low SAT score. He sat out the 2005 college football season. He then played junior college football at Georgia Military College in 2006. In August 2006 before his first season at Georgia Military College, King was arrested and charged with kidnapping and assault after an incident with his ex-girlfriend. However, she declined to prosecute. He later totaled 23.5 tackles and 2.5 sacks during the 2006 season. King was rated the 40th-best junior college prospect by Rivals.com. In late August 2007, King, who had already committed to South Carolina for the 2008 season, was dismissed from the Georgia Military College football team after being accused of stealing from classmates. As a result, he did not play college football in 2007.

In 2008, King joined the South Carolina Gamecocks and was converted to offensive tackle. He was a three-year letterman for the Gamecocks from 2008 to 2010. King started 11 games at left tackle in 2008. In January 2009, he underwent a procedure to treat an irregular heartbeat. He started eight games in 2009, six at left tackle and two at left guard. He suffered a concussion on October 31, 2009, against the Tennessee Volunteers.

In May 2010, King once again underwent an irregular heartbeat procedure. King and teammate Chris Culliver missed the first game of the 2010 season due to an NCAA investigation into the eligibility of several South Carolina Gamecocks players. King and Culliver were later cleared to play for the second game of the season. It was not revealed what the investigation was for. King started seven consecutive games at left tackle before suffering a concussion on November 6 and missing the team's next game against the Florida Gators while Kyle Nunn started in his place. Despite King claiming that he was completely healthy after the Florida game, Nunn began the final five games of the season. King graduated with a sociology degree in December 2010.

== Professional career ==
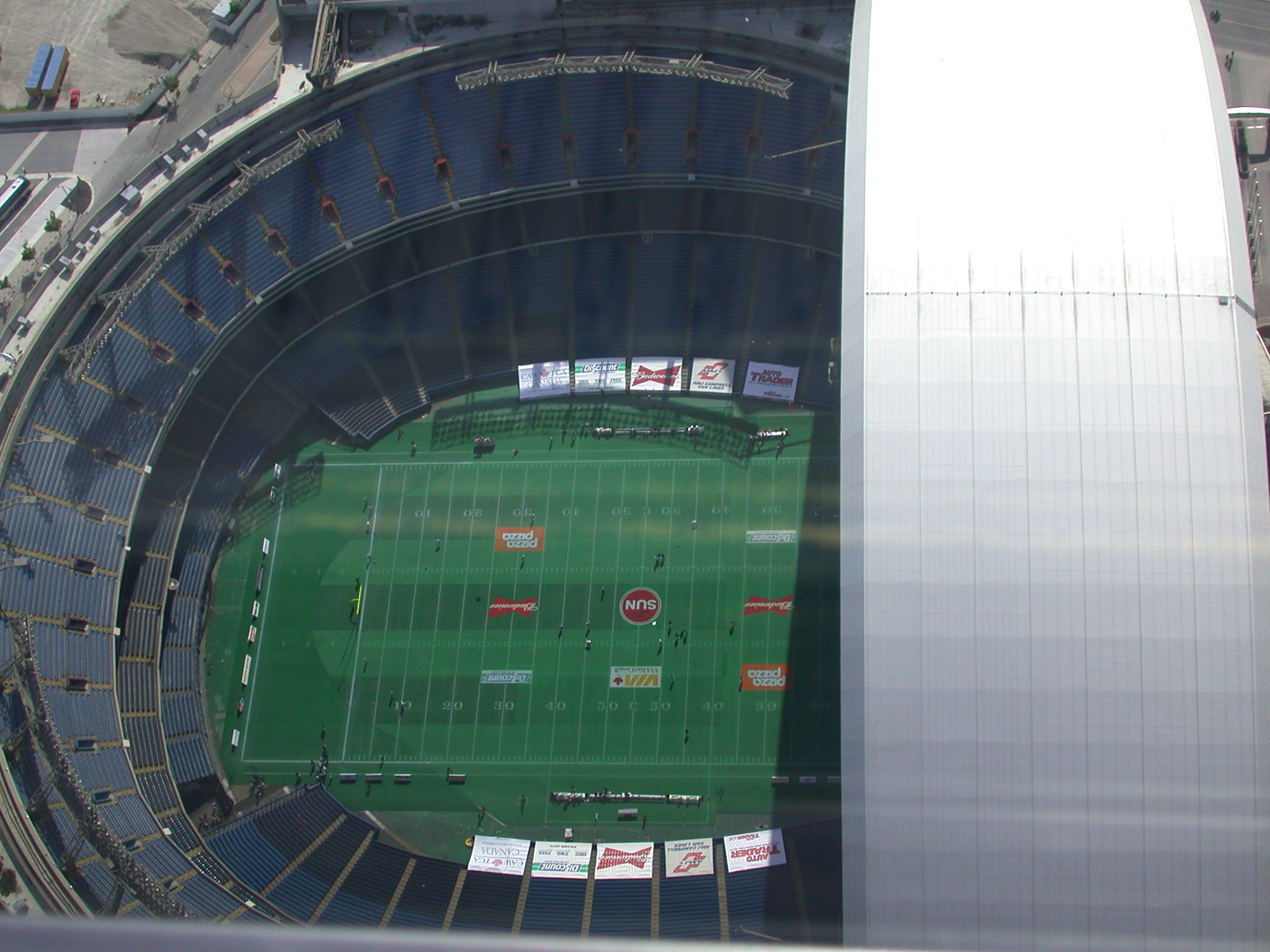
CN Tower view of the Rogers Centre, where King played for the Toronto Argonauts

King worked out at the 2011 NFL Combine, and at South Carolina's Pro Day in March 2011. After going undrafted in the 2011 NFL draft, King was signed by the New York Giants on July 29, 2011. He was waived by the Giants on September 3, 2011.

King was claimed off waivers by the Seattle Seahawks on September 4, 2011. He was on the team's 53-man roster for the entire 2011 season but was hampered by an ankle injury and ended up being inactive for 15 games. He played his only game of the season, mostly on special teams, on December 12 in a 30–13 win over the St. Louis Rams. On December 18, he was listed second on the depth chart at offensive tackle. King was waived by the Seahawks in March 2012 after being arrested for criminal sexual conduct in South Carolina. On July 31, 2014, he was acquitted of all charges.

King played in 15 games, all starts, for the Toronto Argonauts of the Canadian Football League (CFL) in 2013. He was placed on the injured list on October 18, 2013, with a high ankle sprain. King played in 11 games, starting 9, in 2014. In late July 2014, he left the team due to personal reasons but returned in August. King signed a contract extension with the Argonauts in January 2015. He appeared in three games, all starts, during the 2015 season; he had several stints on the injured list.

On December 18, 2015, King was traded to the Saskatchewan Roughriders in exchange for Andre Monroe. King played in six games, all starts, for the Roughriders during the 2016 season; he was on the injured list several times. He was released on June 17, 2017, before the start of the 2017 season.

== Coaching career ==
King has spent time as a football coach after his playing career, including at Pinewood Preparatory School and for the semi-pro Carolina Spartans. He is a physical education teacher at Pinewood Prep as well. He was the head coach of the Charlestown Pirates of the United Football League but the league never played.
