= Woodland Hills Mall =

Shopping mall in Tulsa, Oklahoma

Coordinates: 36°03′48″N 95°52′54″W

- Location: Tulsa, Oklahoma
- Opened: August 4, 1976; 50 years ago
- Developer: Dayton-Hudson Corporation and Homart Development Company
- Manager: Simon Property Group
- Owner: Simon Property Group (51%)
- Architect: Charles Kober & Associates
- Num. of stores: 136
- Num. of anchor tenants: 4
- Floor area: 1,091,888 sq ft (101,439.7 m^{2})
- Floors: 2 (3 in Dillard's)
- Website: www.simon.com/mall/woodland-hills-mall

Woodland Hills Mall is a 1+ million square foot, super regional shopping mall located at 7021 S. Memorial Drive in Tulsa, Oklahoma, United States. It was originally developed jointly by Dayton-Hudson Corporation and Homart Development Company, and opened in August 1976. Woodland Hills Mall features 148 specialty shops and restaurants, 80 of which are unique to the Tulsa area. The anchor stores are JCPenney, Macy's, Dillard's, and Scheels.

== History ==
Woodland Hills Mall opened in 1976 with Sears (which was open prior to the rest of the mall), John A. Brown and Dillard's as its first anchor stores, as well as over a hundred specialty stores spread among the mall's two stories. Charles Kober & Associates of Los Angeles were architects for the mall. Sears hired Coleman-Ervin & Associates to design its store. An expansion in 1982 added a fourth anchor, Sanger-Harris, as well as a food court and several additional smaller stores.

In 1985, J. C. Penney occupied the site of the defunct Brown chain's store, while the Sanger-Harris store was replaced twice, first by Foley's in 1987, then by Macy's in 2006. The mall itself underwent major renovations in 1995 and in 2014. The facility has been owned since 2002 by the Simon Property Group.

In 2015, Sears Holdings spun off 235 of its properties, including the Sears at Woodland Hills Mall, into Seritage Growth Properties. Three years later, on October 15, 2018, it was announced that Sears would be closing as part of a plan to close 142 stores nationwide.

On August 22, 2022, it was announced that Scheels All Sports would demolish and replace the Sears anchor at the mall. The new anchor store building opened on October 19, 2024.

== Entrances ==
Currently, Woodland Hills Mall has four main entrances named after trees. "Acorn", the southeast entrance, and "Redbud", the northwest entrance, lead into the mall's first floor, while "Maple" and "Pinecone", the mall's southwest and northeast entrances, respectively, are on the second floor.

The mall's west entrances border the Scheels anchor, while the east entrances are next to Macy's. Prior to the mall's 1982 expansion, there was only one eastern terminus for both stories, between the Brown and Dillard's anchors.

== Amenities ==
The mall also features many amenities, both free and paid. These include a carousel, free Wi-Fi, and a kids' play area. Holiday amenities include photo opportunities with Santa and the Easter Bunny.

Kiddie Kruzzer strollers are available for at the lower level Redbud entrance and upper level Pinecone entrance (near Macy's). It costs $5, and the customer can select a "Kruzzer". When the customer returns the stroller, a $0.50 refund is issued.

The mall also features parking amenities, including special military parking for veterans and active duty. There are 10 of these parking spots spread across 5 locations. These parking spots can be found by the four main entrances, and near the JCPenney and Macy's entrances.

== Public transit ==
Metropolitan Tulsa Transit Authority (Tulsa Transit for short) operates five bus routes out of Woodland Hills Mall, which are routes 310, 440, 450, 460 and 490. The bus stop for all routes is located on the north side of the Walmart Supercenter outparcel just northwest of the main mall.

== Food court ==
The mall has over 580 seats in its food court, which features a fire pit. The food court can be easily accessed through the Pinecone entrance to the northeast. It features Akira Sushi & Ramen, Auntie Anne's, Burger King, Charleys Philly Steaks, Chick-fil-A, Chinese Gourmet Express, It's Greek To Me, Nori Japan, Neighborhood News Today, Oh K-Dog & Egg Toast, Popeye’s, Ruby Thai, and Taco Shop. The mall also features a Texas de Brazil restaurant, a Brazilian steakhouse, located lower level at the Acorn entrance, on the other side of the mall from the food court, to the southeast. The Cheesecake Factory is located outside on the southeast parking lot.

== See also ==
- Eastgate Metroplex
- Tulsa Promenade
