= Capitol Hill, Oklahoma City =

Neighborhood of Oklahoma City, Oklahoma, US

Coordinates: 35°26′07″N 97°31′17″W

Capitol Hill is a neighborhood of Oklahoma City, Oklahoma. It was originally a separate city that was established in 1905, merging with its larger neighbor in 1911. The neighborhood is located just south of downtown Oklahoma City and borders to the north by the North Canadian River. The North Canadian River is now known as the Oklahoma River for its seven mile course while in Oklahoma City.

The Capitol Hill Urban Design District is an area designated in 1996 by Oklahoma City to maintain the existing historic, architectural and visual character of the area, while at the same time encouraging compatible, quality, new development. Capitol Hill became an official Main Street community in 1997 and today the district enjoys a rich multi-cultural quality

Despite its name, Capitol Hill is a historic business and entertainment district in south Oklahoma City and should not be confused with the capitol campus, which is centered at N. Lincoln Blvd and E. 23rd Street where the state capitol building (of Oklahoma) and other government agencies reside.

== Geography ==
The Capitol Hill neighborhood is south of downtown Oklahoma City, Oklahoma and borders the North Canadian River. Popular use of the name "Capitol Hill" extends far beyond the traditionally designated area.

== History ==
Capitol Hill was platted in 1900 by Benoni Harrington. The district soon became a center of commerce that boasted of major department stores such as John A. Brown and J.C. Penney. With the introduction of malls, particularly Crossroads Mall, many stores left Capitol Hill. Capitol Hill continued to decay until Capitol Hill Main Street, established in 1997, provided a foundation of economic development, promotion, design and organization that is restoring Capitol Hill to its former glory. Since 1997, the district has garnered $14.8 million in public and private reinvestment.

== Art and culture ==
The area is now the center of Hispanic oriented commerce, culture, and nightlife, including the Knob Hill Theater, formally home to the Oklahoma Opry, award winning 250 seat Latino owned experimental and indie rock venue Resonant Head restaurants, bakeries, graphic designers, churches, and service businesses. One of the major employers in the area is the Community Action Agency of Oklahoma and Canadian Counties.

Though the area was annexed by Oklahoma City, it has retained its own chamber of commerce, community newspaper and even its own downtown along Commerce Street.

== Education ==
Schools in the Capitol Hill neighborhood are part of the Oklahoma City school district and include Capitol Hill High School and Capitol Hill Middle School School. Capitol Hill High School was established in 1928 and draws students from a number of middle schools. Nearby Adelaide Lee Elementary School serves Kindergarten through 6th grade students.
