= Eastgate Metroplex =

- Location: Tulsa, Oklahoma, United States
- Coordinates: 36°07′54″N 95°49′11″W
- Opened: 1984 (Eastland Mall) 2007 (Eastgate Metroplex)
- Closed: 2006 (Eastland Mall)
- Developer: Melvin Simon & Associates
- Manager: Grubb & Ellis; Levy Beffort
- Owner: E.G. Ventures
- Num. of stores: 26
- Num. of anchor tenants: 4
- Floors: 2
- Website: eastgatemetroplex.com

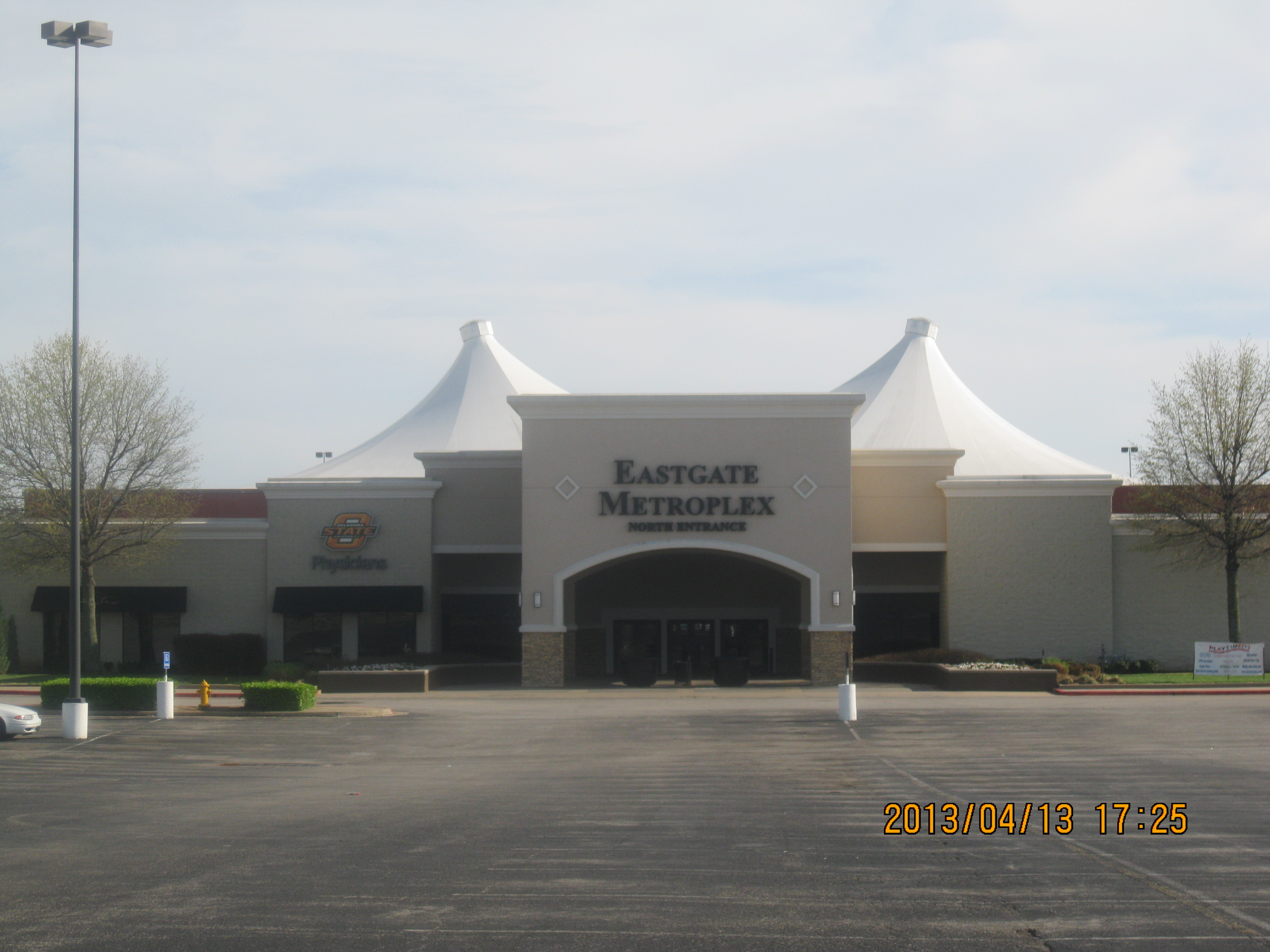
Eastgate Metroplex, showing the fabric structure fabric roof

Eastgate Metroplex is an indoor mixed-use professional/retail complex in Tulsa, Oklahoma. The building was originally a shopping mall that opened in 1984 as the Eastland Mall, but was revitalized into its current use after years of decline.

== History ==
Construction of the mall began during the mid-1970s. But after only partial construction had taken place, the property sat vacant and unfinished for nearly a decade. Around 1984, it was finally open to the public as Eastland Mall and reached full tenancy by the late 1980s. During its prime years, the mall was anchored by Mervyn's, JCPenney, Service Merchandise, and Dillard's, along with a six-screen cinema operated by General Cinema Corporation accessed from the food court.

The mall, first owned by Simon Property Group, was built mainly for the eastern part of Tulsa as a less crowded alternative to Woodland Hills Mall and what was then called the Southland Shopping Center but has since been renamed Tulsa Promenade Mall. Across the street was the Eastland Plaza built up during the late 1980s and early 1990s and originally included since-closed locations for Toys "R" Us, Marshalls, and Target.

== Decline ==
Starting in the mid-to-late 1990s, Eastland Mall began to turn into a dead mall. Easier access to other malls as a result of expanded nearby thoroughfares and sparse development in East Tulsa are speculated by local residents to be the likely causes.

Service Merchandise was the first anchor store to leave around the same time it filed for bankruptcy protection in 1999. It was eventually replaced with Mickey's Family Fun Center, a locally owned 30-lane bowling alley with a restaurant, a LaZer Runner laser tag arena, indoor kart racing and billiard tables. However, Mickey's Family Fun Center closed sometime after 2009. By 2001, JCPenney left its tenant space, which especially pushed several chain stores and smaller tenants to exit. General Cinema filed for bankruptcy protection in 2000 and, by 2002, the six-screen cinema had reverted to local ownership.

As this exodus continued, the mall became increasingly desperate for tenants and storefronts abandoned by brand-name chain stores were replaced with unusual tenants like martial arts academies, a large space for selling arts and crafts at several kiosks, multiple dance studios, a wedding chapel and a live country music bar. The Tulsa Public Library also temporarily took up some unused storefronts while their building was being expanded. A public exhibit for disaster emergency preparedness by the City of Tulsa government was maintained in one of the mall's corridors for a time.

In early 2006, all three Mervyn's locations in Tulsa were closed, including the one at Eastland Mall. In late 2006, the Simon Property Group sold the property to Raleigh, North Carolina–based developer Haywood Whichard, who formed Eastland Partners LLC within a year's time for $2.8 million.

== Redevelopment ==
In 2007, the Eastland Mall started a renovation, first by changing its name to the "Eastgate Metroplex". Except for the food court, all the other trademark tent roofs were replaced and refitted with roofs more suitable for commercial use. The center changed its focus to office space for community service and municipal organizations, continuing education facilities, medical services, health & fitness businesses, as well as some entertainment. The renovation, carried out by Tulsa-based P&H Properties, cost over $50 million.

The first two major tenants in the complex were the Community Action Project of Tulsa County and Coca-Cola Enterprises, the latter announcing a regional headquarters and call center in March 2006. Both opened in October of that year.

In September 2007, the last remaining original tenant Dillard's was closed and was replaced by a three-story office building accessible from the main building itself. In addition, the center area and entrance of the main building were renovated. On May 10, 2008, University of Phoenix opened in the space formerly occupied by Mervyn's.

In September 2012, SpiritBank filed a foreclosure suit on the office building formerly occupied by Dillard's, alleging that Eastgate Partners LLC failed to pay back approximately $2.41 million in loans. General partner Robert E. Phillips responded, claiming that the suit is the result of a misunderstanding: "I'm certain that it will be resolved very quickly, and we've been trying to resolve this for several months."

Enterprise Holdings, which operates Enterprise Rent-A-Car, National Car Rental and Alamo Car Rental brands, announced in September 2014 that it would move 500 employees from its 190,000 square feet (18,000 m^{2}) facility in the Cherokee Industrial Park to a 177,000 square feet (16,400 m^{2}) space in the Eastgate Metroplex. The move involves the company's Shared Services administrative team and the Damage Recovery Unit, which helps manage the claims process when rental vehicles are damaged.

As of 2016, the Eastgate Metroplex houses call centers for multiple companies, including Coca-Cola, Enterprise Rent-A-Car, and Alorica.

== Status of turnaround ==
Gary Chauvin, development consultant for Eastgate, said the turnaround for the former Eastland Mall has been successful, although it still has some unleased space. As of February 2016, 72 percent of the building's 900,000 square feet (84,000 m^{2}) of leasable space is occupied, and that he was negotiating with a client for space that would raise the number to 83 percent. (Note: The space under negotiation is the first floor of the former Dillard's department store. The upper floors are already on long-term lease with Enterprise Holdings.)
