= Quail Springs Mall =

Super-regional shopping mall and trade area

- Location: Oklahoma City, Oklahoma, United States
- Coordinates: 35°36′48″N 97°33′30″W
- Opened: October 23, 1980; 46 years ago
- Developer: DayJay Associates
- Manager: GGP
- Owner: GGP
- Num. of stores: 111
- Num. of anchor tenants: 5
- Floor area: 1,114,927 sq ft (103,580.1 m^{2})
- Floors: 3 (2 in anchors)
- Website: quailspringsmall.com

Quail Springs Mall is a super-regional shopping mall and trade area located in far northern Oklahoma City, Oklahoma, which opened on October 23, 1980 with four original main anchors John A. Brown, JCPenney, Dillard's. and Sears. It now contains three major department store anchors (originally had four anchor stores until 1998 and 2016), a 24-screen AMC Theatre was added in 1998, Round One Entertainment, Blue Zoo Aquarium, and a total of 111 tenants comprising a total of approximately 1,115,000 square feet of gross leasable area. The mall is the focal point of a large area of recent residential and commercial development, and is located very close to one of Oklahoma City's most notoriously congested and difficult intersections which includes West Memorial Road, North Pennsylvania Avenue and The Kilpatrick Turnpike.

Architect William Pereira designed the original building. The mall itself was built by DayJay Associates, a joint venture of JCPenney and The Center Companies, a division of the Dayton-Hudson Corporation (now Target Corporation). The mall underwent a multimillion-dollar renovation during 1998 that brought several exterior updates, completely redesigned the mall's interior style into an Oklahoma prairie theme, updated the lower-level food court to a 1950s drive-in design, plus added the 24-screen AMC Theatre adjacent to the food court.

The mall's main anchors are Life Time Fitness, JCPenney, AMC Theatres, Round One Entertainment, Blue Zoo Aquarium, Von Maur, and Dillard's. Former anchors include Sears 1980-2014 and Macy's 2006-2016 (formerly John A. Brown 1980-1985, Sanger Harris 1986-1987 and Foley's 1987-2006). In late 2013 it was announced that Sears would be closing in early 2014 and Von Maur would be taking their place, in summer 2014 the entire store building was totally gutted (with former auto center area demolished.) to the structural frame and a brand-new interior-exterior installed, Von Maur opened in early 2015. In late 2015, it was announced that Macy's would close by February 2016 as part of the company's cut back and closing unprofitable store locations. In January 2017, it was announced that the former Macy's store building would be demolished and that Life Time Fitness would build a huge free standing 181,400-sq.-ft. complex in the former Macy's parking lot and the former store building spot would become a new parking lot for Life Time Fitness and the mall. Life Time Fitness opened in October 2018, the former Macy's store upper-level and ground floor-level mall entrances now features an Oklahoma themed mural while upper-level mall entrance is now just another direct entrance into the mall itself (along with the original direct mall entrance just Twenty feet away.) the ground floor-level of the former Macy's Store was totally gutted and filled in for the new parking lot with the ground floor-level mall entrance permanently walled off.
