= Challenger Columbia Stadium =

Multi-purpose stadium in League City, Texas

- Interactive map of Challenger Columbia Stadium
- Former names: Second District Stadium (planning)
- Location: 2145 West Nasa Boulevard; League City, Texas 77573
- Coordinates: 29.5183°N 95.1355°W
- Owner: Clear Creek ISD
- Operator: Clear Creek ISD
- Capacity: 10,000
- Surface: Synthetic turf
- Scoreboard: 34' by 19' LED screen

Construction
- Groundbreaking: 26 March 2014
- Opened: 10 March 2016
- Cost: $39,079,651
- Architect: PBK Architects

Tenants
- Clear Brook High School; Clear Creek High School; Clear Falls High School; Clear Lake High School; Clear Springs High School

Website
- Challenger Columbia Stadium

Challenger Columbia Stadium is a multi-purpose stadium in League City, Texas. It is the second stadium in the Clear Creek Independent School District (CCISD) and serves all five of its comprehensive 6A high schools. The stadium was built to relieve the overused and deficient Veterans Memorial Stadium and end the frequently scheduled Thursday night football games for all the CCISD high schools.

== History ==
CCISD's Veterans Memorial Stadium was built in the 1950s at Clear Creek High School to serve the one 3A high school in the district at the time. Since then, the district has grown tremendously, opening four more high schools. Since 2000 alone, the district has built two high schools, opening Clear Springs High School in 2007 and Clear Falls High School in 2010. With five 6A high schools to serve, Veterans Memorial Stadium is unable to fully handle the load, leading to numerous Thursday football games. Events at Veterans Memorial, in turn, increase traffic and congestion at neighboring CCISD facilities and residential area. Stadium parking overflows into the parking lots at Clear Creek High School, Clear Creek Intermediate, the CCISD Education Support Center, and neighboring businesses and residences. The traffic also affects the already congested Five Corners of League City, where the stadium is located.

Clear Creek ISD held a bond election on 11 May 2013 with the construction of a second district stadium as a major item. The bond was approved with 68% in favor. The 2013 Bond also calls for the rebuilding of multiple campuses in the district and major construction at others, along with the introduction of improved technological learning.

The stadium broke ground on 26 March 2014 at a ceremony with family members of the Challenger and Columbia crews and members of various CCISD extracurricular activities (football, band, cheerleading, track, etc.) present.

Challenger Columbia Stadium was originally scheduled for completion in mid-2015, in time for the 2015 high school football season. However, heavy rains in the Houston-area throughout the spring of 2015 led to construction delays. Clear Creek ISD eventually determined that the stadium would not be done in time for the 2015 season, and the schedules for the five high schools had to be changed and consolidated back to only one stadium, Veterans Memorial Stadium.

After multiple delays, Challenger Columbia Stadium opened in March 2016 with an official dedication on 10 March 2016. The dedication ceremony included the athletes, bands, and cheerleaders from the five high schools and tributes to the crew members lost in the Challenger and Columbia disasters.

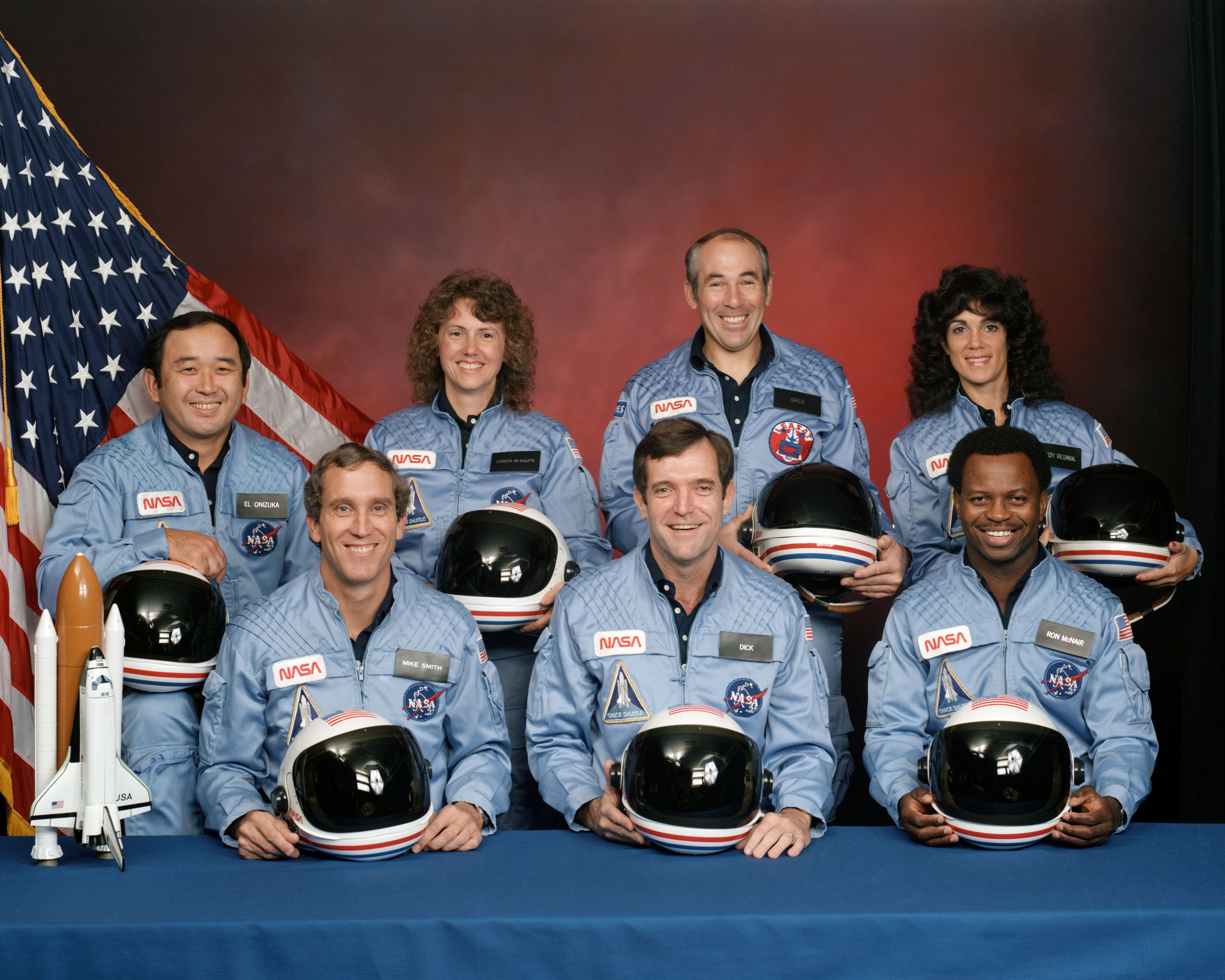
Crew of STS-51-L (Challenger disaster)

== Naming ==
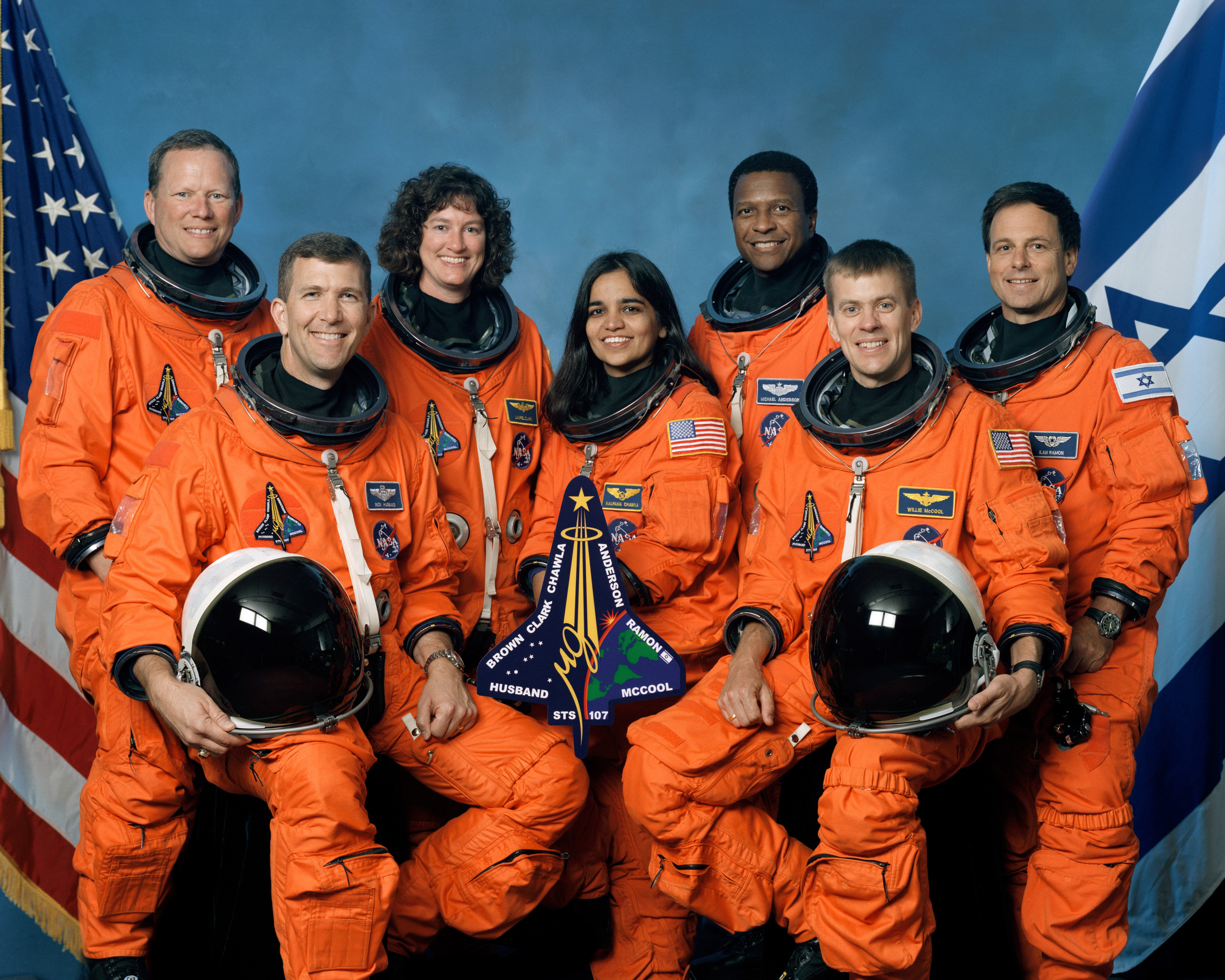
Crew of STS-107 (Columbia disaster)

CCISD serves the Clear Lake area, including the area directly around NASA's Johnson Space Center. The stadium site is also located adjacent to the Challenger Seven Memorial Park. The district chose the name Challenger Columbia Stadium to honor the fourteen astronauts who lost their lives in both the Challenger and the Columbia disasters in 1986 and 2003, respectively. Clear Creek ISD broke ground on Challenger Columbia stadium on 26 March 2014 with family members of some of the lost crew members in attendance.
