= Tulsa Promenade =

Tulsa Promenade Mall
- Location: Tulsa, Oklahoma, United States
- Coordinates: 36.104009°N 95.92207°W
- Opened: 1965, 1986 as it currently stands
- Closed: September 17, 2023
- Owner: Tulsa Promenade LLC (Kohan Retail Investment Group)
- Num. of stores: 0
- Num. of anchor tenants: 4
- Floor area: 926,426
- Floors: 2
- Parking: 4,187

Tulsa Promenade Mall was a 926,426-square-foot (86,067.8 m^{2}) shopping center located in the Midtown section of Tulsa, Oklahoma. At the time of its closing, it was anchored by Dillard's, Extra Space Storage (occupying a building formerly owned by JCPenney), Genesis Health Clubs (occupying a portion of a building formerly owned by Mervyn's), TruHealth Integrated Care (occupying another portion of a building formerly owned by Mervyn's), CREOKS (occupying the remaining portion of a building formerly owned by Mervyn's), and WeStreet Ice Center (occupying the space formerly owned by Macy's). The Tulsa Promenade sat on 22 acres of land and ceased operations on September 17, 2023.

== History ==
The original structure was built in 1965 as an outdoor shopping center called Southland, anchored by Brown-Dunkin (now Dillard's) and JCPenney. In 1986, the property was rebuilt as an indoor mall, retaining the Dillard's and JCPenney stores as anchors while adding Mervyn's as a third. (Note: Mervyn's has since gone out of business, and Sky Fitness, has leased much of the original Mervyn's ground floor space.) Campbell Company developed the original plaza, and Robert B. Aikens converted it to the present-day mall structure.

The next physical renovation to Tulsa Promenade Mall was in 1996 with parking structures on the north and south sides of the center, expansion of Dillard's and addition of Foley's. (Note: Foley's was acquired by Macy's in 2005, which re-branded all existing Foley's stores as Macy's in 2006. The Macy store in Promenade Mall permanently closed on March 26, 2017.) In 1998 the Hollywood Palace 12 Theatre opened. The 1999 renovation added carpeting, fixtures, additional restrooms. The tenant mix was enhanced significantly over the next few years with the addition of El Chico restaurant and many retail concepts. In 2005, the center was renovated with the addition of a soft play area, indoor fountains and planters, a glass elevator and a newly designed exterior corner consisting of signage and landscaping.

In 2014, the mall began celebrating 50 years of having a shopping center on the land. The mall replaced older carpet, and had plans to update lighting and paint the interior. At this time (2014), the mall was 91% occupied.

In 2015, concerns of the parking garage crumbling were made known to the public. Straps were holding cracked pillars together. A contractor was hired, but fired by mall management.

Mervyn's, which occupied two floors on the west end of the mall as an anchor store, closed in 2005. In 2011, approximately 75% of the first floor (of the former Mervyns space) was leased by Sky Fitness (now known as Genesis Health Clubs), leaving about 25% of the first floor and 100% of the second floor still vacant. In January 2017, Macy's announced that they will be closing the Promenade location by the end of the year; it closed on March 26, 2017.

On August 6, 2017, an EF-2 tornado crossed part of Midtown Tulsa, lying within the area bounded by 41st and 51st streets and Memorial Drive and Sheridan Road. Promenade Mall was affected, but suffered only light roof and structural damage. Stores were able to reopen within two days after the event. No injuries occurred inside the mall, since the tornado struck shortly after 1 AM.

In January 2019, the mall's movie theater Hollywood Theaters Palace 12 abruptly closed. Mall management said the theater would reopen in two weeks under a different company which never ended up happening. Due to missed mortgage payments and long term maintenance issues, the mall went into receivership in July 2019. Tulsa Promenade was returned to Kohan's ownership in September 2019.

On January 17, 2020, it was announced that JCPenney would also be closing on April 24, 2020, as part of a plan to close six stores nationwide. The store closure was delayed until July 21 due to COVID-19.

In 2021, the entire second floor was vacated, with tenants moving to the first floor, relocating outside of the mall, or closing permanently. Dillard's remained open on its second floor, albeit with locked doors to the mall interior.

In June 2022, it was announced that the Tulsa Oilers would be purchasing the former Macy's with plans to convert it to a practice rink as well as opening it to the public to use. The renovation should take about 18 months. The completed facility, named WeStreet Ice Center, will house two ice rinks, a pro shop, full-service restaurant and bar, arcade, party rooms, and office space.

On September 11, 2023, mall management notified all tenants the mall will permanently close on September 17, 2023. According to local news organizations, a fire marshal with the Tulsa Fire Department issued citations to the Tulsa Promenade due to fire code violations stemming from issues with the fire suppression system, fire alarm system, and other items (such as fire extinguishers) being out of date. The Tulsa Fire Department permitted the Tulsa Promenade to remain open if the property management company hired a fire watch company to provide early fire detection and show progress was being made to become compliant with local fire codes. However, the property management team informed the Tulsa Fire Department that operations would cease on September 17, 2023, and would no longer employ the fire watch company.

The businesses occupying the anchor buildings on the perimeter of the Tulsa Promenade (Dillard's, Extra Space Storage, Genesis Health Clubs, TruHealth Integrated Care, CREOKS, and the WeStreet Ice Center currently under construction) are not impacted by the closing of the interior of the Tulsa Promenade due to those buildings having their own fire suppression systems.

On January 16, 2024, Dillard's announced that the store will transition into a Dillard's Clearance Center. This transition is expected to happen around Easter weekend and will feature a grand re-opening of the store with the second level closed. On March 13, 2024, the words 'Clearance' would appear under the Dillard's branding on the building.

On March 9, 2024, the WeStreet Ice Center would open to the public. The building is 140000 square feet and will serve as the official practice facility of the Tulsa Oilers, Oklahoma State University’s collegiate hockey team and the Tulsa Jr Oilers; a Jr. A program who will play in 2024–25 in the NA3HL.

On April 23, 2025, local news broke a story of the malls interior condition. Multiple doors to access the malls interior were unlocked, trash was scattered, evidence of homeless, as well as fires on the property. The city of Tulsa has received numerous complaints about the unkept property and the health department has received complaints about standing water inside. On May 5, most doors were welded closed, leaving the main mall entrances as the only entry points.

On May 8, 2025, the mall was scheduled to be put on the auction block. Kohan owes $799,788.50 for 2021–2024 taxes. Kohan must pay 25% of this by June 6, 2025, to remove the mall from being auctioned off for now.

On June 5, 2025, taxes for year 2021 were paid at the last possible minute preventing the mall from being sold at the county tax auction to be held on the 9th. The payment for tax year 2021 was $265,609.05. Kohan still owes taxes from 2022 to present and city leaders said they would be in the same position next year to auction off the mall. Per county records, the mall has a fair cash value of $9,547,700 with the land value of $5,619,600; the mall itself (improvement value) is $3,928,100.

On June 17, 2025 a storm came through and damaged part of the former mall. The storm ripped part of the façade/wall of the closed Hollywood Theaters. Steel beams, wires, and insulation were exposed along part of the theater's wall. Winds were estimated to be around 65-70 MPH. Interesting to note, this same area was affected from the 2017 tornado. The area was repaired over the next couple of months with the area still blocked off.

In the fall of 2025, various glass entry points were broken, resulting in the glass being boarded up. No future plans have been announced for the property as of late 2025.

== See also ==
- Eastgate Metroplex
- Woodland Hills Mall
