= Crossroads Mall (Oklahoma) =

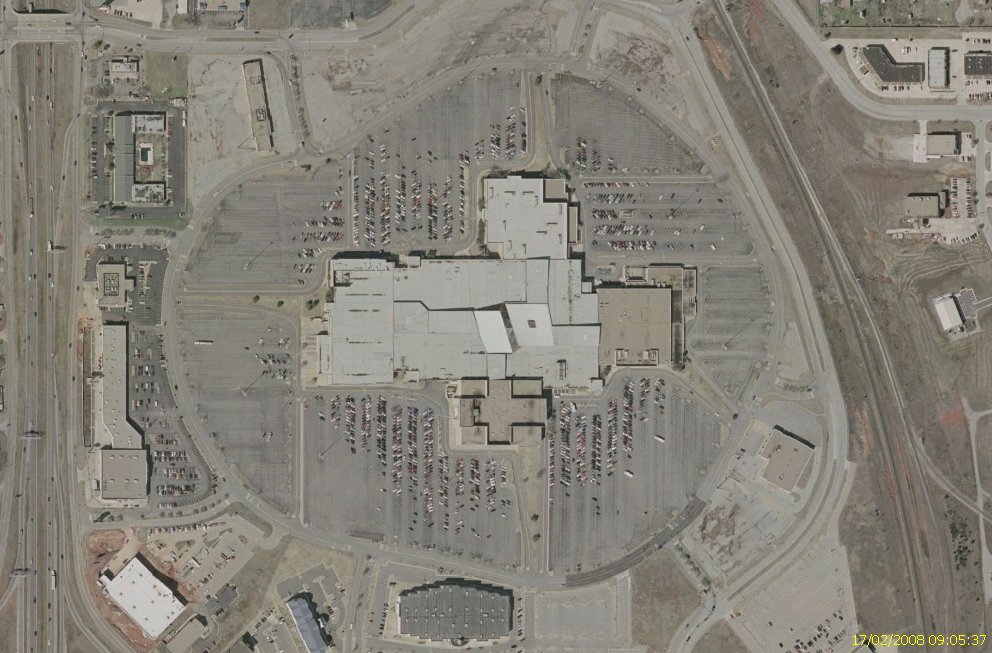
- Overhead satellite image of Crossroads Mall
- Location: Oklahoma City, Oklahoma, United States
- Coordinates: 35.3956°N 97.4904°W
- Opened: February 13, 1974
- Closed: October 31, 2017
- Owner: Linn’s Crossroads Plaza LLC
- Architect: Architectonics, Inc., Phelps-Spitz-Ammerman-Thomas, Inc.
- Num. of stores: 0 (100+ at peak)
- Num. of anchor tenants: 0 (4 at peak)
- Floor area: 1,268,000 sq ft (117,800 m^{2})
- Floors: 2

Crossroads Mall (also known as Plaza Mayor) was a 1,268,000 sq ft (117,800 m^{2}) super regional shopping mall and trade area located in south Oklahoma City, Oklahoma, United States.

== History ==
The Crossroads Mall opened on February 13, 1974, with anchor stores Dillard's, Montgomery Ward, and JCPenney. The John A. Brown store opened August 5, 1974 as the largest location in the state of Oklahoma at 150,000 square feet. The name "Crossroads" was chosen because the Mall lies at the major intersection of I-35 and I-240. Architectonics, Inc. of Dallas and Phelps-Spitz-Ammerman-Thomas, Inc. of Oklahoma City were the architects. C. H. Leavell & Co. of El Paso was general contractor. At the time of its opening, it was one of the largest construction projects ever in Oklahoma, and was also among the ten largest shopping malls in the United States. A 1974 Daily Oklahoman newspaper article described the mall as "the most magnificent enclosed and air-conditioned shopping mall in the Southwest." Before the mall's closure, the mall contained approximately 36 stores and services as well as a large trade zone outside of the mall building with multiple retailers, and restaurants, including two hotels and a movie theater. Crossroads Mall was one of the more popular shopping establishments in the city for well over twenty years and was noted as one of the reasons for the suburban flight of retail shops from Downtown Oklahoma City, something that is beginning to be reversed with an increase of retail shops following the Metropolitan Area Projects Plan.

In 2001 Montgomery Ward closed its doors due to bankruptcy. Throughout the late 2000s, the other three anchor stores, along with other small stores, eventually vacated the mall as a result of the 2008 financial crisis and increased gang activity.

The property was foreclosed on in April 2009 and it fell under the ownership of the Federal Reserve Bank of New York due to the Bear Stearns bailout. The mall was part of a portfolio of Bear Stearns assets, including $5.5 billion in commercial loans, that the Fed used to secure $29 billion to lend to JPMorgan Chase to buy Bear Stearns. According to Price Edwards & Co.’s 2010 Oklahoma City Mid-Year Retail Market Summary report, Crossroads Mall was 75 percent vacant. On September 14, 2011, the mall was purchased by Raptor Properties, LLC for $3.5 million, far below the $24 million asking price, although the sale only included 762,532 square feet (70,841.5 m^{2}), as several other parts of the property were previously sold to other investors.

=== Rebranding and closure ===
In April 2013, Raptor Properties announced plans to rebrand Crossroads Mall in a similar fashion to the revitalized La Gran Plaza in Fort Worth, Texas by attracting businesses that serve the local Hispanic community. On April 24, 2013, Raptor announced that the new name of the mall would be Plaza Mayor at the Crossroads with future renovations to include space for a grocery store, a nightclub and a rodeo arena seating 3,500 spectators. The mall's entrances and bathrooms would have also been remodeled and the carousel moved to make way for a new stage and entertainment area although these plans were never fully realized. On September 29, 2017, CRM Properties announced that they had abandoned plans to rehabilitate the mall, and would close it permanently on October 31, 2017 with only the tenants left an antique shop and high school space for Santa Fe South High School.

=== Repurposing ===
As of 2021, the mall is home to, in the former Montgomery Wards store, “Santa Fe South High School” for students and the former JCPenney is being used for a shop called “Crossroads Antiques & Collections” in the upper level portion while the lower level is used for miscellaneous events. The rest of the in-line mall sits vacant along with the former Dillard's space.

In July 2021, it was announced that the mall was bought for $6 million by Linn's Crossroads Plaza LLC. In a Facebook post announcing the sale, Paul Ravencraft and George Williams with Price Edwards said the new owner plans to repurpose the mall over the next year, with plans to be revealed at a later date. The 800,070-square-foot property consists of the in-line mall, and the former JC Penney and Dillard's spaces at 7000 Crossroads Blvd.

On January 20, 2021, the former John A. Brown, Sanger-Harris, Foley's, and Macy's spaces were Purchased by SFS DEVELOPMENT INC, to use as an automotive parts warehouse for a local dealership chain. The new owner has indicated that they plan to re-develop the building into a learning center for Children.

In October 2022, there had been reports of plans to reopen the facility, after renovations.

In October 2022, the Oklahoma City Wranglers, a semi-pro football team in the UFL (distinct from the United Football League formed in 2024), announced it would build a temporary 8,400-seat stadium for the spring season in April, 2023. The $1.1 million, open-air stadium will be built on the south side of the mall between the old J.C. Penney and Dillard's spaces. Nevertheless, the plans never materialized and the team ultimately never played a game.

In February 2025, it was announced that the mall had been purchased for $9 million by the “Crossroads Renewal Project,” a faith-based non-profit led by Chris Brewster, the superintendent of Santa Fe South Charter Schools, which was operating a school in the former Montgomery Ward store. The organization planned to expand the schools and add other family and community amenities to fill the mall and eventually reopen it. The project was expected to cost $80-85 million and as of April 2025 is still in early stages of development.
