= Springfield Three =

1992 unsolved missing persons case in Missouri

- Excerpt from missing persons flyer
- Date: June 7, 1992
- Duration: Missing for 34 years, 5 months and 4 days
- Location: 1717 E. Delmar Street Springfield, Missouri, U.S.; 37°11′41″N 93°15′47″W
- Type: Disappearance
- Missing: Sherrill Levitt; Suzanne "Suzie" Streeter; Stacy McCall
- Website: Springfield Police Dept.

The Springfield Three refers to an unsolved missing persons case that began on June 7, 1992, when friends Suzanne Elizabeth "Suzie" Streeter and Stacy Kathleen McCall, and Streeter's mother, Sherrill Elizabeth Levitt, went missing from Levitt's home in Springfield, Missouri, United States. All of their personal belongings, including cars and purses, were left behind. There were no signs of a struggle except a broken porch light globe; there was also a message on the answering machine that police believe might have provided a clue about the disappearances, but it was inadvertently erased.

In 1997, Robert Craig Cox, a convicted kidnapper and robber, claimed that he knew the women had been murdered and that their bodies would never be recovered. Neither their whereabouts nor their remains have ever been discovered. No investigators in the case believe Cox has any credibility.

== Background ==
Sherrill Elizabeth Levitt (born November 1, 1944) was 47 years old at the time of her disappearance. She was 5 feet 0 inches (1.52 m), 110 pounds (50 kg), with short light blonde hair, brown eyes and pierced ears. She was a cosmetologist at a local salon, and was a single mother reportedly very close to her daughter, Suzanne Elizabeth "Suzie" Streeter. Streeter (born March 9, 1973) was 19 years old and 5 feet 2 inches (1.57 m), 102 pounds (46 kg), with shoulder length blonde hair and brown eyes. Her distinguishable marks included a scar on her upper right forearm, a small mole on the left corner of her mouth, and pierced ears (left ear pierced twice). Stacy Kathleen McCall (born April 23, 1974) was 18 years old, was 5 feet 3 inches (1.60 m) and 120 pounds (54 kg), with long dark blonde hair and light colored eyes.

== Timeline ==
=== June 6, 1992 ===
Streeter and McCall graduated from Kickapoo High School at 4:00 p.m. on Friday, June 6, 1992, at the Hammons Student Center on Southwest Missouri State University's, now Missouri State University's, campus. Levitt attended to witness her daughter graduate. Both Streeter and McCall were last seen at around 2:00 a.m. on June 7 while leaving the last of the few graduation parties they attended that evening. After graduation, the school provided an alcohol-free lock-in inside the building until 8:00 a.m. on June 7, 1992. Streeter and McCall declined and instead planned to later meet up at their friend Janelle Kirby's house for a party at their neighbors after finishing family dinners; Levitt turned down an invitation to dinner with the Kirby family after the graduation ceremony.

"If she [Levitt] wanted to get ahold of her daughter [Suzie], she knew exactly where to call," says Kathy Kirby, mother of Janelle. "... We had told her to call us if she needed to get ahold of Suzie... Our phone did not ring one time."

After having photographs taken with her graduation cake and receiving a Cocker Spaniel puppy as a graduation present, McCall departed for Kirby's residence. Streeter also took photographs that evening at the Delmar residence, with her friend Nigel Kenney, before departing for the Kirby residence. Following the party, the trio of Suzie, Stacy, and Janelle planned to drive down to a Branson motel, spend the night, and connect with friends the next morning at the water park White Water. McCall's mother, Janis, advised against driving that night in fear of a car accident due to alcohol. Streeter promised to call Nigel Kenney on the morning of June 7 to meet at White Water; McCall promised to call her mother.

Once both girls arrived at the Kirby residence, they began partying with Janelle Kirby's neighbors in Battlefield before changing plans and carpooling to other parties in Springfield. At roughly 10:00 p.m. Stacy McCall called her mother Janis with another change of plans. "Mom, don't worry, we're not going to Branson tonight," Stacy told her. Janis stated that a new plan was made "with the understanding that between 8:00-8:30 a.m. the next morning, everyone would get together to go to White Water."

Levitt was last heard from at approximately 11:15 p.m. on June 6 when she spoke with a friend on the phone about painting and varnishing an armoire in her bedroom.

Their last party at the residence of McCall's friend's house, Michelle Elder, was broken up by Springfield Police at 1:50 a.m. before the trio of girls returned to Kirby's house in Battlefield around 2:00 a.m. Elder stated at her party that she and McCall wanted to rekindle their friendship, so the pair made plans for the evening of Sunday, June 8.

The original trio of girls planned to spend the night at Kirby's house. However, after realizing her house was too crowded with out-of-town relatives for her graduation, Streeter and McCall decided to go to Levitt's home at 1717 East Delmar for the night. Streeter reportedly was excited to show McCall her recently delivered king-sized waterbed. Janelle's mother Kathy told Springfield Police she overheard the pair leaving while in bed. Streeter allegedly told McCall "follow me to my house" to which McCall replied, "Okay, I will." It is assumed they arrived at the Delmar residence because their clothing, jewelry, purses and vehicles were all present there the next day. There were also used makeup wipes found in the bathroom trash can, assumedly from Streeter and McCall after returning to the Delmar residence.

=== June 7, 1992 ===
The following day around 9:00 a.m., Kirby and her boyfriend, Mike Henson, visited the house after Streeter and McCall failed to show up at her home; they had planned to spend the day at White Water, and were supposed to leave from Kirby's residence. "I started getting worried because Stacy, she's so responsible and so is Suzie," said Kirby. "I know they wouldn't just take off without telling us they weren't going to White Water." Upon arriving, Kirby found the home's front door unlocked and entered, but found no sign of Streeter, McCall, or Levitt; each of the women's cars were parked outside. She also reported to police that the glass lamp shade on the porch light was shattered, though the lightbulb was intact. Henson helped Kirby sweep the broken glass off the porch, which police later determined may have destroyed potential evidence; Henson stated he did this because Kirby was barefooted. Nigel Kenney, a coworker and close friend of Streeter's, stated she was a "creature of habit" and very particular about parking her vehicle in the same spot of the residence's driveway. Kenney believes that because Streeter's car was not in the carport as usual, someone else could have possibly parked in her spot when she and McCall arrived before dawn on June 7. Kirby claimed that the front door was unlocked.

In the house, Kirby found Levitt and Streeter's dog, a Yorkshire Terrier named Cinnamon, who appeared agitated. As they were leaving the residence, Kirby answered a "strange and disturbing call" from an unidentified male who made "sexual innuendos". She hung up, immediately received another call of a sexual nature, and again hung up. The phone calls were jarring. However, she remembered Streeter complaining about prank calls at the residence since moving in with Levitt in the spring of 1992. According to Springfield Police Department's David Asher, the calls were "obscene... The individual would not identify himself... They were using the F-word and several other words and she just hung up the phone." Almost immediately, the phone rang again. "Obscene phone call again, click. It's over with," said Asher. Kirby described the caller as "teenish." With no sign of Streeter or McCall, Kirby and Henson decided to visit the local water park "HydraSlide" (now defunct) in Springfield instead of White Water in Branson.

Several hours later, McCall's mother, Janis, also visited the house as her daughter failed to answer her calls. Janis had friends who knew employees of White Water and became panicked after they confirmed Streeter and McCall had not been seen there. Janis claimed that the front door was still unlocked.

Inside the Delmar residence, the family dog Cinnamon came "barreling towards" her. "The dog was in there just going crazy, just yipping and crying," said Janis. She noticed all three women's purses were sitting on the floor of Streeter's bedroom; Levitt's purse still contained a cash deposit of almost $900 (est. 2026: ~ $2,213) from her work at the salon, despite said purse not being located in her own bedroom. Janis also saw her daughter's clothing neatly folded in Streeter’s bedroom from the night before, the only clothes McCall had possession of that night; Janis noticed that Stacy's shirt and underwear were missing. Streeter and McCall's recently used makeup wipes were found along with their jewelry and keys. Levitt and Streeter's cigarettes were left inside the house which was considered unusual by Levitt's friends and family who described her as a chainsmoker. An unfinished can of Coke was also found next to Streeter's cigarettes in her bedroom. On Streeter's headboard was the book "Oh, the Places You'll Go!" by Dr. Seuss. The lights were off in Streeter's room and her television was showing snow, suggesting they had watched a movie that night but never turned off the television after it was finished.

Janis frantically called police from the home's telephone to report the three women missing; after placing the call, while checking the phone's answering machine, she listened to a "strange message"; however, it was inadvertently erased as was common for most voicemails in the 1990s after being played once. Police were "very interested" in the call and believed it "may have contained a clue". They also did not believe it was connected to the prank calls Kirby received.

McCall's parents contacted police in reference to their daughter's disappearance from Levitt's home more than sixteen hours after the women were last seen, and other worried friends and family called and visited the house the following day. Police later estimated that the crime scene had been corrupted by at least ten to twenty people who visited Levitt's house and tidied up the residence while the women were missing, including emptying ash trays and cleaning coffee cups. "When I arrived the first thing I noticed were several people in the yard, the door was open and people were coming and going from inside the house," said Springfield Police Department's Rick Bookout. Upon the officers' arrival, the scene showed no signs of a struggle, except for the shattered porch light. Police also noted Levitt's bed had looked slept in and that the window blinds were awkwardly bent, as though someone had been looking out. All personal property was left behind including purses, money, cars, driver's licenses, keys, medicine, cigarettes, and the family dog Cinnamon, who was most likely the only witness of the women's disappearances.

Levitt had a doctor's appointment scheduled Monday, June 8, 1992; she was also scheduled to work later that week at New Attitudes Hair Salon.

McCall was scheduled to work on June 8, 1992, at the Springfield Gymnastics Center.

Streeter was scheduled to work at a local movie theatre, Town & Country 6 Theatre, on Tuesday, June 9, 1992, at 4:00 pm.

None of the women would arrive for these dates.

== Later developments ==
On December 31, 1992, a man called the America's Most Wanted hotline with information about the women's disappearances, but the call was disconnected when the switchboard operator attempted to link up with Springfield investigators. Police said the caller had "prime knowledge of the abductions" and publicly appealed for the man to contact them, but he never did.

Levitt and Streeter were declared legally dead in 1997. However, their case files are still officially filed under "missing".

Investigators received a tip that the women's bodies were buried in the foundations of the south parking garage at Cox Hospital. In 2007, crime reporter Kathee Baird invited Rick Norland, a mechanical engineer, to scan a corner of the parking garage with ground-penetrating radar (GPR). Norland found three anomalies "roughly the same size" that he said were consistent with a "grave site location"; two of the anomalies were parallel, and the other was perpendicular. Springfield Police Department (SPD) spokesperson Lisa Cox said that the person who reported the tip "provided no evidence or logical reasoning behind this theory at that time or since then." She also said the parking garage began construction in September 1993, over a year after the disappearances. "Digging up the area and subsequently reconstructing this structure would be extremely costly, and without any reasonable belief that the bodies could be located here, it is illogical to do so, and for those reasons SPD does not intend to. Investigators have determined this lead to not be credible." Darrell Moore, a former assistant at the Greene County Prosecutor's Office, said the tip came from someone who either "claimed to be a psychic or claimed to have a dream or vision about the case".

== Suspect ==
Robert Craig Cox was convicted of the 1978 murder of Sharon Zellers in Florida in 1988. That conviction was overturned by the Florida Supreme Court a year later. In 1997, Cox was imprisoned in Texas as a convicted kidnapper and robber, and the suspect in a Florida murder, told journalists that he knew the three women had been murdered and buried and claimed their bodies would never be recovered. In 1992, Cox had been living in Springfield and, when interviewed then, told investigators that he was with his girlfriend at church the morning after the women disappeared, which she corroborated. However, she later recanted her statement and said that Cox had asked her to say that. Cox also stated that he was at his parents' home the night of the disappearance, and they confirmed that alibi. Authorities were uncertain if Cox was involved in the case or if he was seeking recognition for the alleged murders by issuing false statements. Cox stated to authorities and journalists he would disclose what happened to the three women after his mother died.

== In media ==
The case remains unsolved as of 2026, in spite of upward of 5,000 tips from the public. In June 1997, a bench was dedicated to the women inside the Victim's Memorial Garden in Springfield's Phelps Grove Park.

The case has been featured on shows such as 48 Hours and America's Most Wanted. Investigation Discovery aired "The Springfield Three" on its Disappeared TV series. In 2019, the same channel's People Magazine Investigates featured a tabloid-style episode titled "The Springfield Three".

In 2021, journalist Anne Roderique-Jones launched The Springfield Three: A Small-Town Disappearance podcast.

== See also ==
- Fort Worth Missing Trio – Unsolved 1974 disappearance of three girls in Texas
- List of people who disappeared mysteriously (2000–present)
- Yuba County Five – 1978 deaths and disappearance in California
