= Chapel Hills Mall =

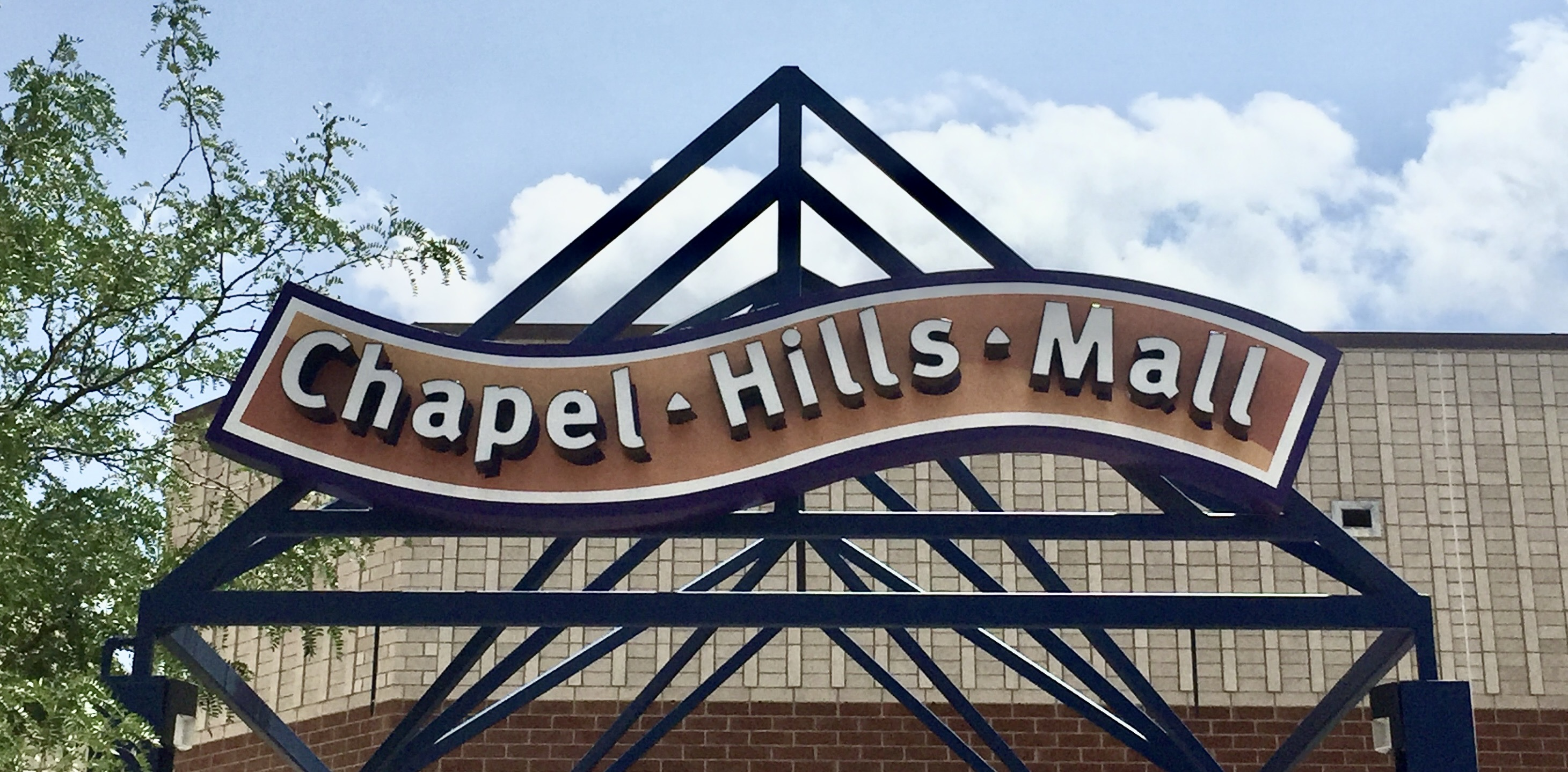
- The sign above the mall's northeast entrance
- Location: Colorado Springs, Colorado, United States
- Coordinates: 38.945°N 104.795°W
- Opened: August 4, 1982
- Developer: General Growth Properties and Homart Development Company
- Manager: Mason Asset Management
- Owner: Namdar Realty Group
- Num. of stores: 81 (as of 2026)
- Num. of anchor tenants: 6 (5 open, 1 vacant, other 1 demolished)
- Floor area: 1,103,227 sq ft (102,493.1 m^{2})
- Floors: 2 (3 in Dillard's)
- Parking: 5,800 spaces
- Website: chapelhillsmall.com

Chapel Hills Mall is an enclosed shopping mall located in Colorado Springs, Colorado, United States, with 1,103,227 square feet (102,493 m^{2}) of gross leasable area. The anchor stores are AMC Theatres, Dick's Sporting Goods, Dillard's, H&M, American Freight, and Macy's. There is one anchor space that was redeveloped into housing where the store Sears was located. It is currently made up of several apartment complexes.

== History ==
=== 1980s ===
Initial development of the Chapel Hills Mall began in the mid-1970s, with the mall project receiving approval from the board of county commissioners in August 1974. General Growth Properties (GGP) spearheaded development. GGP also developed Colorado Springs' other enclosed mall, The Citadel. Construction on the mall began in late 1979 and finished by mid-1982. The mall officially opened on August 4, 1982, although Sears and the six-screen movie theater adjoined to the mall had opened a couple of months prior. Original anchors to the mall were Sears, H.J. Wilson's Catalog Showrooms, Kmart, and Fashion Bar.

In March 1985, A 135,000 square foot expansion opened, primarily consisting of a new Joslins. The H.J. Wilson's was converted into a Service Merchandise when Service Merchandise acquired the whole chain. The next significant expansion opened in September 1986. It included sixty new storefronts and a two-story Mervyn's, totaling around 76,000 additional square feet. Joslins expanded its storefront in 1987 by 43,000 square feet by taking over vacant space in the mall's lower wing.

=== 1990s ===
During the early 1990s recession, Chapel Hills lost tenants and struggled to attract new ones. The presence of several discount retailer anchors like Kmart and Sears likely discouraged higher-end chains from moving to the mall. In 1990, Dillard's announced its intent to build its first Colorado Springs location in the Chapel Hills Mall but scrapped those plans to create a new store at The Citadel instead. The mall saw vacancy rates as high as 15 percent during this time. In 1994, Service Merchandise closed its doors. JCPenney moved into the vacated space a year later with a store that attempted to cater to wealthier customers with high-end décor and a limited amount of hardline goods.

In the latter half of the 1990s, Chapel Hills saw a surge of growth thanks to new retailers and a $40 million renovation project. In 1996, Carmike Cinemas expanded its location by building six screens in a space vacated by Furr's Cafeteria. In 1997, Dillard's opened a three-story new-construction anchor location. By the end of the decade, the mall had also added a regulation-size ice arena, a two-story Borders Books, a Ruby Tuesday, a children's play area, a climbing wall, and new nationwide retailers. Joslins became Foley's in 1998 when the owner of Foley's, May Department Stores, purchased the location from Dillard's, which had purchased Joslins's owner, Mercantile Stores Co., and subsequently divested itself from stores in malls where Dillard's already had a presence.

=== 2000s ===
In 2000, Old Navy opened its first Colorado Springs location at the mall by renovating eight storefronts' worth of space with a total square footage of 20,037. Foley's rebranded itself to Macy's in 2006 when Macy's bought Foley's's parent, May Department Stores. Mervyn's closed its store in early 2006 along with most of its other Colorado locations. Burlington Coat Factory opened in Mervyns’ place in 2007. Also in 2007, Dick's Sporting Goods opened a 50,000-square-foot store in a space that had been repurposed from the ice arena, which had closed to allow Dick's a space at the mall. Kmart closed in 2009. During the midst of the Great Recession in 2009, the mall's owner, General Growth Properties, filed for bankruptcy.

=== 2010s ===
After emerging from bankruptcy, General Growth Properties identified the Chapel Hills Mall as an "underperforming mall." In June 2011, GGP sold the mall to a partnership between Coyote Management LP and Garrison Investment Group for $71.5 million, which was $40.7 million less than what GGP owed on the mall. Garrison eventually became the mall's sole owner. The vacancy rate in the mall was around 15 percent when GGP sold it.

In 2011, Old Navy moved its store from the mall to a space in a nearby strip mall, and Borders closed due to the chain's bankruptcy. In 2013, Carmike Cinemas opened a new 13-screen movie theater in the space occupied by the original theater and Kmart. H&M opened a 21,904-square-foot store in 2013. JCPenney closed its store in 2014 as part of a nationwide closure of underperforming stores. Toby Keith's I Love This Bar & Grill announced in 2014 its intent to build a restaurant on the first floor of the former Borders location but later scrapped the plans. Gordmans briefly opened in the former JCPenney space in 2016 before shuttering a few months later in 2017 when the chain filed for bankruptcy. In 2017, the Carmike Cinemas became an AMC following AMC Theatres's acquisition of Carmike.

In 2017, Garrison Investment received foreclosure notices on the mall totaling $37 million, the largest default in El Paso County history. Reasons for why the mall fell into foreclosure were unknown. In 2018, a coalition of companies, including Namdar Realty Group, purchased the Chapel Hills Mall for $33.5 million, less than half of the price the mall had sold for seven years earlier. The departure of several prominent anchors and the threat of losing others contributed to the reduction in price. Namdar had previously purchased The Citadel in 2015, giving it control over both of Colorado Springs' enclosed malls.

Sears announced in 2018 that it would close its Chapel Hills Mall location in 2019 as part of a plan to close 80 stores.

=== 2020s ===
Burlington closed its 41,000-square-foot store in early 2020 after it failed to come to a lease agreement with the owner of its space, a separate entity from the mall's owner. Burlington opened a new location in a strip mall across the street in 2021. In response to the COVID-19 pandemic and related local health mandates, the Chapel Hills Mall temporarily closed for approximately a month in April 2020.

The former Sears building and parking lots were razed in 2021 to make way for a 300-unit “suburban-style” apartment complex that developers are constructing adjacent to the mall, which were completed in 2023. In 2024, plans were announced to renovate the former Burlington store into a new indoor pickleball complex and to build an interactive aquarium in the mall.

In 2023, the former Gordmans store was renovated into an American Freight store which opened in early 2024. However, American Freight would be short lived as it announced it would close in November 2024.
