= Jackson Crossing =

- Location: Jackson, Michigan, U.S.
- Coordinates: 42.268°N 84.428°W
- Opened: 1961
- Developer: Weatherwax Investments
- Owner: Namdar Realty Group
- Num. of stores: 46
- Num. of anchor tenants: 7 (6 open, 1 vacant)
- Floor area: 656,568 square feet (60,997.2 m^{2})
- Floors: 1
- Public transit: JATA
- Website: shopjacksoncrossing.com

Jackson Crossing, formerly Paka Plaza, is one of two enclosed shopping malls serving the city of Jackson, Michigan in the United States. It opened in 1960 and has been renovated in the 2000s. Anchor stores include Target, Kohl's, Best Buy, and TJ Maxx.

== History ==
Paka Plaza opened in 1961 as an outdoor center with 34 stores. Original tenants included Kroger, W. T. Grant, and Woolworth. Phar-Mor was an original anchor store following renovations. Sears opened a department store at the mall five years later, relocating from downtown Jackson. In 1973, following the opening of Westwood Mall, Paka Plaza was enclosed. Ramco-Gershenson Properties Trust bought the mall from its original developers, Weatherwax Investments, in 1990 and renamed it to Jackson Crossing. The center was also expanded again, adding further enclosed portions along with Target and Kohl's.

Bed Bath & Beyond joined in 2002 and TJ Maxx in 2005.

Jackson Crossing has had an increase in vacancies, with 15 vacant storefronts in late 2010. Citi Trends opened at the mall late in the year. In 2015, Sears Holdings spun off 235 of its properties, including the Sears at Jackson Crossing, into Seritage Growth Properties. Pizza Hut and Panera Bread are also on the Seritage site.

In 2016, MC Sports moved from its existing store in the mall to a larger location. MC Sports went out of business in 2017, followed by longtime tenant Toys "R" Us in 2018.

On August 22, 2018, it was announced that Sears would be closing as part of a plan to close 46 stores nationwide. The store closed in November 2018. After the store closed, Target, Kohl's, Best Buy, TJ Maxx and Bed Bath & Beyond were the remaining anchors left. Also in November, Namdar Realty Group acquired Jackson Crossing.

On March 25, 2019, Dunham's Sports signed a lease for the former Toys "R" Us. On October 12, 2019, Dunham’s Sports officially opened in the mall. Grand opening sales started on October 18. In June 2021, Hobby Lobby opened a 57,000 square-foot store in part of the former Sears.
