= Lakeland Square Mall =

Coordinates: 28.091359°N 81.977932°W

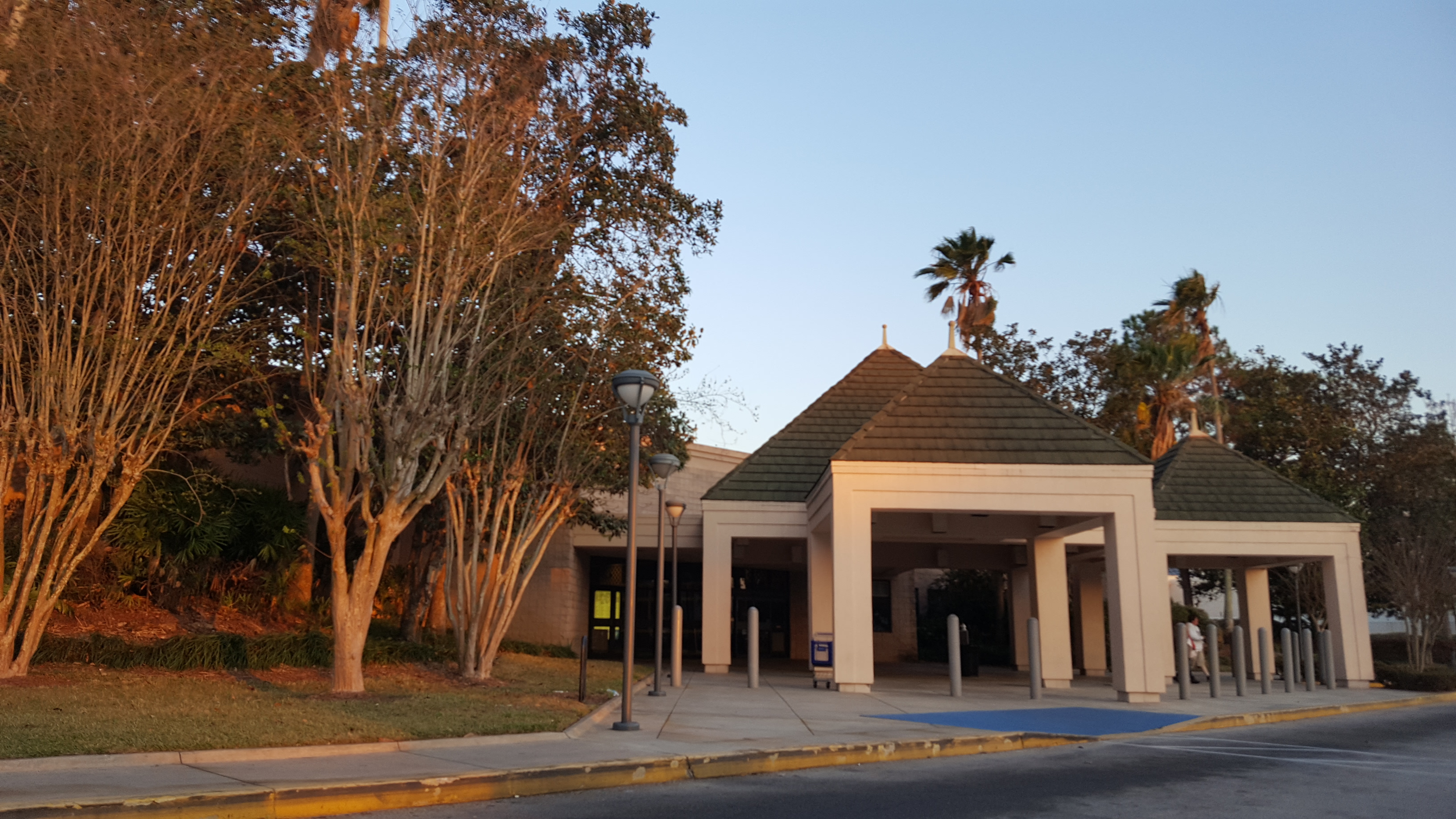
- Entrance to Lakeland Square Mall, April 2017
- Location: Lakeland, Florida
- Opened: 1988; 38 years ago
- Developer: Edward J. DeBartolo Corp. and Homart Development Co.
- Manager: Spinoso Real Estate Group
- Num. of stores: 92
- Num. of anchor tenants: 7 (5 open, 1 vacant, 1 coming soon)
- Floor area: 890,000 sq ft (83,000 m^{2})
- Floors: 1
- Parking: 4,500
- Public transit: Citrus Connection bus: 1, 15, 47, 61
- Website: www.lakelandsquare.com

Lakeland Square Mall is a shopping center situated on the northern side of Lakeland, Florida. Serving Polk County as one of only two enclosed malls, it holds the distinction of being the sole shopping destination off I-4 between Tampa and Orlando. Presently, the mall is anchored by Dillard's, Bin Chasers Lakeland, J. C. Penney, Urban Air Adventure Park, and Cinemark Theatres.

== History ==
Developed by Edward J. DeBartolo and Homart, Lakeland Square Mall opened in 1988. When it first opened, the mall featured anchor stores such as Mervyn's, Sears, and Belk (originally signed as Belk-Lindsey), followed shortly by the addition of Maison Blanche, which was originally planned to be Robinson's of Florida, which was acquired by Maison Blanche in 1987. In 1990, J. C. Penney joined the mall, and in 1994, Burdines also became part of the lineup, relocating from downtown Lakeland. Dillard's took over the space previously occupied by Mervyn's in 1997.

In 1995, General Growth Properties acquired the Homart Company, and management was subsequently transferred to General Growth Properties.

In 1998, Maison Blanche, after being acquired by Dillard's, became Dillard's North, housing the women's departments, while the former Mervyn's location became Dillard's South, housing the men's, children's, and home departements. In 2004, Burdines transformed into Burdines-Macy's and completed its transition to Macy's in 2005. Belk closed its doors later in the same year, coinciding with the opening of a new Belk location in Lakeside Village. The vacant space left by Belk was filled by a Burlington Coat Factory in the fall of 2007.

Dillard's South ceased operations in 2012, consolidating its presence to the former Maison Blanche store. The vacant anchor spot once occupied by Mervyn's was demolished in 2012 to make way for the construction of a new 12-screen Cinemark Theatres and Sports Authority. This new complex opened in 2013.

In 2015, the Sears property was among the 235 properties sold by Sears Holdings to Seritage Growth Properties. Sports Authority closed along with the rest of the chain in 2016, and its space was later occupied by Urban Air Adventure Park in August 2018. Macy's closed in 2017, and Resale America took over the space in November 2019.

Sears, as part of a 142-store closure round, also closed in 2018. Charlotte Russe, which had closed earlier in the year, reopened at the mall as part of the chain's plan to open 100 stores in 2019. In 2022, Burlington closed its doors and relocated across the street to the Shoppes of Lakeland shopping center.

In 2026, Rural King filed plans to open a store in the 151,276-square-foot (14,054.0 m^{2}) building that was formerly Sears.
