= La Gran Plaza de Fort Worth =

- Location: Fort Worth, Texas
- Coordinates: 32.686°N 97.326°W
- Address: 4200 South Freeway
- Opened: 1962
- Developer: Homart Development Company
- Owner: Boxer Retail
- Architect: Preston Geren, George Dahl, Loebl, Schlossman & Bennett
- Num. of stores: 200+
- Floor area: 1,077,782 square feet (100,129.2 m^{2})
- Floors: 2
- Website: www.lagranplazamall.com

La Gran Plaza de Fort Worth, is a Hispanic-themed shopping mall in Fort Worth, Texas. Opened in 1962 as Seminary South, later known as Fort Worth Town Center in 1987, it was reinvented as a mall catering to largely Latin American clientele in 2005 after losing most of its major stores thru the 1990s to early 2000s. Current major tenants include Burlington, Ross Dress for Less, and El Mercado.

== History ==
The center opened for business on March 14, 1962 as Seminary South Shopping Center. It was the first shopping mall built by Homart Development Company, a former division of Sears department stores through which they built shopping malls.

Its original tenants included Sears, G. C. Murphy, and Stripling's department store. Other major tenants included Buddies supermarket (later Winn Dixie), Finger Furniture, and a seven-story office tower. JCPenney was added in 1964, and Dillard's joined in 1977. On 23 December 1974, the car of the three girls that became known as the Fort Worth Missing Trio was found in the Sears upper-level parking lot.

Texas Centers bought the building from Homart in 1985 and announced renovation plans, including enclosure of the formerly open-air concourses.

The Stripling's store was later renamed Stripling & Cox before closing in 1989. Around this point, the mall began losing traffic and tenants to other centers in the area, such as Ridgmar Mall and Hulen Mall. Despite the loss of stores, a movie theater and food court were added, the latter replacing G. C. Murphy. As a result of declining traffic, JCPenney closed in 1997, followed by Sears and Dillard's, leaving the mall without an anchor store.

In 2004, Legaspi bought the property, which at the time had only a 10 percent occupancy rate. The new owners reinvented the property to cater to a largely Hispanic clientele, including the addition of El Mercado, a market for local vendors, in the former Dillard's space. Burlington and Ross Dress for Less replaced the Sears space.
