= Homart Development Company =

Former American shopping center development company

- Type: Subsidiary
- Industry: Mall development
- Founded: 1959; 67 years ago
- Defunct: 1995; 31 years ago
- Fate: Acquired by General Growth Properties
- Successor: General Growth Properties
- Headquarters: Chicago, IL
- Products: Shopping centers
- Parent: Sears

Homart Development Company, a Chicago-based subsidiary of Sears, was one of the largest builders of shopping centers and malls in the United States from 1959 to 1995.

== Company history ==
As retail development in the United States shifted away from downtowns with the growth of suburbia after World War II, some major department stores such as Sears moved into the business of developing malls in which to place new anchor tenant locations. Homart Development Company was founded in 1959 for the purpose of building regional shopping malls for Sears. The "Homart" brand name had been used by Sears for many years before the development company was founded.

Seminary South Shopping Center in Fort Worth was their first project.

By 1971, Homart was operating nine regional shopping locations, and had numerous others in development. It became the nation's second largest mall developer, and by 1992 it was reported that Homart had developed 80 malls with over 75,000,000 square feet (7,000,000 m^{2}) of retail space. By 1994, it was also operating 36 of those developed malls.

In November 1994, Sears announced that it planned to sell off Homart as part of a restructuring. General Growth Properties completed an acquisition of Homart in late 1995 in a transaction valued at $1.85 billion, then one of the biggest real estate deals in history. Homart also owned a number of office buildings which were also sold in 1995.

== Management ==
Sears executive Emory Williams was the first president of Homart. Warren G. Skoning was appointed president in 1967, and elected as chairman in 1974. Also serving as vice-president of real estate development for Sears, Skoning was involved in the development of the Sears Tower. W.E. Lewis was named president in 1974 when Skoning became chair.

Edwin Homer, former president of Chrysler Realty, joined as president in 1980, later became chair and CEO, and served until his retirement in 1984. Homer diversified Homart's portfolio by developing office properties and community centers, in addition to malls, and also sold some of Homart's malls to generate additional profit for Sears.

In 1985, Michael J. Gregoire was named president and COO, and he also became chairman in 1987.

== Notable projects ==
Notable shopping centers developed by Homart include:

Mall name	Town	State	Notes	Year opened
Seminary South Shopping Center	Fort Worth	Texas	An open-air mall which opened in March 1962. It was sold by Homart in 1985. It was renovated and enclosed, and reopened as the Fort Worth Town Center in 1987, and then as "La Gran Plaza de Fort Worth" in 2004.	1962
Hancock Shopping Center	Austin	Texas		1964
Coronado Center	Albuquerque	New Mexico		1965
Colonie Center	Albany	New York	First enclosed shopping mall in New York State's Capital Region.	1966
Inland Center	San Bernardino (Inland Empire area)	California		1966
Midland Mall	Warwick	Rhode Island	Renamed the Rhode Island Mall in March 1985. Closed in 2011.	1967
Nanuet Mall	Nanuet (Greater New York City)	New York	First enclosed mall in Rockland County. Closed in 2012 for redevelopment.	1969
Woodfield Mall	Schaumburg (Chicago metropolitan area)	Illinois	Joint venture with A. Alfred Taubman, was world's largest enclosed mall at time of opening.	1971
Eastridge Mall	San Jose	California	Joint venture with A. Alfred Taubman	1971
Town East Mall	Mesquite (Greater Dallas Area)	Texas		1971
Los Cerritos Center	Cerritos (Greater Los Angeles Area)	California	Joint venture with The Hahn Company	1971
Castleton Square	Indianapolis	Indiana	Joint venture with Edward J. DeBartolo	1972
Parkway Plaza	El Cajon (San Diego Metropolitan Area)	California	Joint venture with The Hahn Company	1972
Valley View Center	Dallas	Texas		1973 (closed 2022)
Metrocenter	Phoenix	Arizona	Joint venture with Westcor	1973 (Closed 2020)
Altamonte Mall	Altamonte Springs	Florida	Jointly developed with Edward J. DeBartolo Corporation	1974
Maplewood Mall	Maplewood (Minneapolis–Saint Paul area)	Minnesota		1974
Independence Center	Independence (Kansas City area)	Missouri		1974
Westminster Mall	Westminster (Orange County)	California		1974
Northbrook Court	Northbrook (Chicago metropolitan area)	Illinois		1976
Orland Square Mall	Orland Park (Chicago metropolitan area)	Illinois		1976
Eden Prairie Center	Eden Prairie (Minneapolis–Saint Paul area)	Minnesota		1976
Florence Mall	Florence (Cincinnati metropolitan area)	Kentucky		1976
Woodland Hills Mall	Tulsa	Oklahoma	Joint venture with Dayton-Hudson Corporation. Expansion completed by Homart in 1982	1976
Fairlane Town Center	Dearborn	Michigan	Joint venture with A. Alfred Taubman and Ford Motor Land Development	1976
Lakeside Mall	Sterling Heights	Michigan	Joint venture with A. Alfred Taubman and Dayton-Hudson Corporation	1976
Burnsville Center	Burnsville (Minneapolis–Saint Paul area)	Minnesota		1977
Brea Mall	Brea (Orange County)	California		1977
Louis Joliet Mall	Joliet	Illinois	Renamed in mid 2000s as Westfield Louis Joliet	1977
Twelve Oaks Mall	Novi	Michigan	Joint venture with A. Alfred Taubman and Dayton-Hudson Corporation	1977
Broward Mall	Plantation (Miami Metropolitan Area)	Florida		1978
Baybrook Mall	Friendswood (Greater Houston)	Texas		1978
Metrocenter	Jackson	Mississippi	Joint venture with Jim Wilson & Associates	1978
Acadiana Mall	Lafayette	Louisiana	Joint venture with Robert B. Aikens & Associates	1979
Fiesta Mall	Mesa (Phoenix metropolitan area)	Arizona	Opened on October 3, 1979.	1979 (closed 2018)
Spring Hill Mall	West Dundee (Chicago metropolitan area)	Illinois		1980 (closed 2024)
Town Center Mall	Boca Raton (Miami Metropolitan Area)	Florida	Also known as Town Center at Boca Raton	1980
Bannister Mall	Kansas City	Missouri	Joint venture with Copaken White & Blitt.	1980 (closed 2007)
Eastgate Mall	Cincinnati	Ohio	Joint venture with Jacobs Visconsi & Jacobs, J.C.P. Realty, and Cincinnati Partners.	1980
NewPark Mall	Newark	California	Joint venture with Macy's.	1980
Willowbrook Mall	Houston	Texas		1981
Greenbrier Mall	Chesapeake	Virginia		1981
Westgate Mall	Amarillo	Texas		1982
Chapel Hills Mall	Colorado Springs	Colorado	Joint venture with General Growth Properties	1982
Dover Mall	Dover	Delaware		1982
Deerbrook Mall	Humble (Greater Houston)	Texas		1984
North Shore Square	Slidell	Louisiana		1985
Tysons Galleria	Tysons Corner (Washington Metropolitan Area)	Virginia	Joint venture with Lerner Enterprises	1988
Lakeland Square Mall	Lakeland	Florida	Joint venture with Edward J. DeBartolo Corporation	1988
The Parks at Arlington	Arlington (Greater Dallas area)	Texas		1988
Rolling Oaks Mall	San Antonio	Texas	Joint venture with Simon Property Group	1988
Vista Ridge Mall	Lewisville (Greater Dallas area)	Texas	Joint venture with Herring Marathon Group and JCP Realty	1989
Arden Fair Mall	Sacramento	California	Rebuilding of Arden Fair Mall	1989
The Shoppes at Buckland Hills	Manchester (Greater Hartford area)	Connecticut	Opened in March 1990 as "The Pavilions at Buckland Hills".	1990
Steeplegate Mall	Concord	New Hampshire	Opened August 1, 1990	1990
Bay City Mall	Bay City	Michigan	Joint venture with Robert B. Aitkens	1991
Pembroke Lakes Mall	Pembroke Pines (Miami metropolitan area)	Florida		1992
Moreno Valley Mall	Moreno Valley	California	Built on the former Riverside International Raceway site that hosted auto racing from 1957 to 1989.	1992
North Point Mall	Alpharetta (Atlanta metropolitan area)	Georgia		1993
Natick Collection	Natick (Greater Boston)	Massachusetts	The original mall built in 1966 was purchased by Homart in 1992, subsequently demolished and rebuilt in 1994.	1994
The Woodlands Mall	The Woodlands (Greater Houston)	Texas	Joint venture with The Woodlands Corporation	1994
