= Cajun Navy =

Informal disaster response efforts in Louisiana

The Cajun Navy are ad hoc volunteer groups comprising private boat owners who assist in search and rescue efforts in the United States as well as offer disaster relief assistance. These groups were formed in the aftermath of Hurricane Katrina and reactivated in the aftermaths of the 2016 Louisiana floods, Hurricane Harvey, Hurricane Irma, the 2018 Hidalgo County flood, Hurricane Florence, Tropical Storm Gordon, Hurricane Michael, Hurricane Laura, Hurricane Ida, Hurricane Ian, and Hurricane Helene. They are credited with rescuing thousands of citizens during those disasters.

These groups draw their name from the region's Cajun people, a significant number of whom are private boat owners and skilled boat pilots. Their boats consist of a number of types, but are typically small vessels such as bass boats, johnboats, air boats, and other small, shallow-draft craft easily transported to flooded areas.

== Background ==
The term Cajun Navy had earlier, unrelated jovial origins before it evolved into its current usage. The earliest documented use of the term occurred in 1964 when outgoing governor Jimmie Davis received "a commission as a commodore in the Cajun Navy plus a four-star pirogue for his personal use" as a going-away gift by the Greater Lafourche Port Commission. It was also used in 1995 by a sub-krewe of the Krewe of Denham Springs as part of the krewe's Mardi Gras parade theme of "And Away We Go."

Contemporary usage appears to have been coined in 2005 to describe private boaters who served as volunteer rescuers in New Orleans after Hurricane Katrina; it was apparently used as such by then-Tulane University history professor Douglas Brinkley in a speech, as cited in the Baton Rouge Advocate:

Among the unsung heroes, Brinkley said, are those anonymous boat operators—dubbed the Cajun navy—who navigated their private fishing boats and other vessels through flooded New Orleans to lend a hand after the hurricane hit. The sight of it all made him rethink his view of some laborers. 'I saw guys chain-smoking cigarettes...with tattoos out there saving dozens of lives,' he said in a recent address to the annual meeting of the Council for a Better Louisiana. Brinkley said official rescuers stood to the side, in some cases unable to navigate the streets-turned-waterways that demanded the navigational savvy of natives to the area.

— Douglas Brinkley, Tulane University

The term received more currency in 2015, the tenth anniversary of Hurricane Katrina, when commemorative articles in the media referred to the loose organization of south Louisiana boaters. CBS News, for example, reported that year, "Hurricane Katrina killed an estimated 1,800 people, but it could have been far worse if not for what became known as 'The Cajun Navy.' Hundreds of people in hundreds of boats gathered in Lafayette, Louisiana, to rescue thousands trapped by floodwaters..."

== Deployments ==
=== Hurricane Katrina (2005) ===
Former Louisiana state senator Nick Gautreaux put out a plea across local television and radio for "Anybody [who] wants to go help the people of New Orleans please come to the Acadiana Mall." Between 350 and 400 boats and people showed up. This makeshift flotilla that became known as the Cajun Navy is credited with rescuing more than 10,000 people from flooded homes and rooftops.

=== South-central Louisiana flood (2016) ===
In 2016, major flooding struck south-central Louisiana, resulting in even more attention for the informal rescue organization. "[M]akeshift flotillas popped up across the region over the weekend," observed USA Today during the disaster. "Many are operating under a name familiar in Louisiana: the Cajun Navy." Fortune magazine noted, "In the midst of one of the most severe (yet least-reported) natural disasters in recent history, a homegrown volunteer rescue squad known as the Cajun Navy is providing badly needed relief in flood-ravaged Louisiana."

The Baton Rouge Advocate summed up the feelings of many when it wrote: "The heroes hailed from the Cajun Navy, the nickname for an impromptu flotilla of volunteers who had no admiral, no uniforms, no military medals awaiting them for acts of valor. It was conscience, not a commanding officer, that summoned them into treacherous currents to carry endangered citizens to higher ground." The following year, one rescuer recalled ferrying as many as seven people at a time out of flooded Baton Rouge neighborhoods in his 16-foot boat.

Technology was first introduced by one of the boaters in 2016 and played a critical role during the Cajun Navy rescues. At first, people would show up and put their boats in the water without any direction. There was little organization and no way to define which areas had been rescued and which were still in need. One volunteer realized that a couple of mobile phone applications that he used for a game, Zello and Glympse, would be helpful in organizing the rescue attempts. He organized his teammates in the game to come teach boaters and other volunteers how to use the apps for the needed rescues. Eventually, the boaters would be directed by a core group of volunteers who would take requests to be rescued from the Cajun Navy Facebook group page.

One volunteer started to gather requests into a Google spreadsheet which was accessible to other volunteers. They vetted the requests by calling phone numbers provided in the posts to the Facebook group page or using Facebook Messenger, then the volunteers used the Zello application to dispatch a nearby boater. Technology was essential to the success of the Cajun Navy.

=== Hurricane Harvey (2017) ===
In August 2017, the Cajun Navy engaged in rescue operations in response to the major flooding of Southeast Texas by Hurricane Harvey. The Chicago Tribune referred to them "roar[ing] into Pasadena, Texas...in high-clearance pickup trucks with bass boats and pirogues like the Cajun Cavalry, ready to help search and rescue efforts alongside first responders who were inundated with thousands of calls across the region".

Cajun Navy groups formed in the year following the Louisiana flooding performed more than 5,000 rescues in Southeast Texas, throughout cities and towns including Houston, Beaumont, Port Arthur, and Vidor. Multiple teams acted behind the scenes using social media to organize hundreds of citizens. Volunteers acted as citizen dispatchers, relaying requests for rescue from the Cajun Navy Facebook page to those boaters who could perform the rescue via Zello.

In recognition of the help the Cajun Navy provided, the Houston Thanksgiving Day Parade included a float featuring many of the Cajun Navy members who performed rescues in the flood waters.

=== Hurricane Irma (2017) ===
In cooperation with U.S. Senator Marco Rubio, the Cajun Navy agreed to participate in relief efforts for storm surge victims of Hurricane Irma within central and southern Florida, in September 2017.

=== Hidalgo County flood (2018) ===
The Cajun Navy assisted victims of flooding in Hidalgo County, Texas.

=== Hurricane Florence (2018) ===
In September 2018 the Cajun Navy was activated and sent to New Bern, North Carolina to assist with rescues in the wake of major flooding from Hurricane Florence. They rescued 160 people, many from the tops of their cars and some using air mattresses because the winds were severe enough to topple boats, until local emergency management told them their help was no longer needed because all rescues could be handled by local first responders.

=== Tropical Storm Gordon (2018) ===
Also in September 2018, Cajun Navy members were mobilized in anticipation of possible flooding in New Orleans generated by Tropical Storm Gordon.

=== Hurricane Laura (2020) ===
Early on August 27, Hurricane Laura made landfall near peak intensity on Cameron, Louisiana. Laura was the tenth-strongest U.S. hurricane landfall by windspeed on record. The United Cajun Navy worked with United Way of Southwest Louisiana to provide supplies and relief efforts in Lake Charles, Louisiana.

=== Hurricane Sally (2020) ===
United Cajun Navy responded to Hurricane Sally providing supplies for Pensacola Florida residents as well as Orange Beach Alabama. Hurricane Sally was a destructive Atlantic hurricane which became the first hurricane to make landfall in the U.S. state of Alabama since Ivan in 2004, coincidentally on the same date. The Cajun Navy ended up teaming with Lowes in Pensacola, Florida to cook for residents who had no power (the first hot meal some of them had had in days).

=== Hurricane Helene (2024) ===
The Cajun Navy responded to Hurricane Helene in Florida, Georgia, Tennessee, and North Carolina. In North Carolina, the Cajun Airforce dropped supplies into the city of Asheville.

== Formal Chapters ==
Although initially informal groups of rescuers, there have been recent efforts to create a much more organized structure for the Cajun Navy. There are now several formal groups who have registered as nonprofit organizations. The nationally known United Cajun Navy, operating in several key states around the United States of America and the regionally known Cajun Navy 2016 are two examples.

== Future endeavors ==
In addition there are also groups known as the "Cajun Special Forces", the "Cajun Army", “Cajun Commissary”, and the “Cajun Airforce” that assist with post-flood projects such as supplying survivors with food, water and supplies, gutting houses, and other various rebuilding efforts.
