= Namdar Realty Group =

Real estate investment firm

- Type: Private
- Industry: Retail, real estate
- Founded: 1999; 27 years ago
- Founder: Igal Namdar
- Headquarters: Great Neck, New York, United States
- Products: Shopping malls
- Website: namdarrealtygroup.com

Namdar Realty Group is a private, family-owned real estate investment trust based in Great Neck, New York. As of 2021, the company owns over 400 properties.

Namdar's mall portfolio largely consists of "class B" and "class C" malls in small-to-midsize markets, many of which have been classified as dead or dying.

== Strategy ==
Namdar's business strategy focuses on acquiring pre-built "class B" and "class C" malls in smaller markets. Because of their locations and current states, the malls are typically purchased in cash for around $5.3 million. Once acquired, properties' maintenance spending is substantially reduced (up to 67% less than other malls), and store rents are lowered to avoid low vacancy rates. The company will also often sell its malls' outparcels.

Namdar's purchases are typically made with a partner firm, Mason Asset Management. Uber Capital Group, Gorjian Acquisitions, and CH Capital Group have also been Namdar partners. Namdar's primary source of investment capital comes from bonds on the Tel Aviv Stock Exchange.

== History ==
Igor Namdar established Namdar Realty Group in 1999. Namdar and Mason partnered to begin purchasing malls in 2012, with the first mall purchased being Desoto Square Mall in Bradenton, Florida. Phillipsburg Mall in Warren County, New Jersey, was purchased from PREIT in 2013 for $11.5 million, with numerous subdivisions and sales later occurring including the anchor building housing Kohl's. The roof at the former Sears at the Phillipsburg Mall would later collapse. Lawsuits were ongoing in 2018 over lack of maintenance by Namdar of Regency Square Mall in Jacksonville, Florida. Voorhees Town Center in Voorhees Township, New Jersey, was having maintenance and security issues the same year. Jennifer Furniture was purchased in June 2020 by John Garg and Namdar. Namdar and Mason purchased most of the bankrupt Goodrich Quality Theaters chain in July 2020. Namdar was a partner in several New York City area property purchases in 2021.

Namdar was part of a group of investors who attempted to purchase The Bon-Ton from liquidation. The group also included DW Partners LP and Washington Prime Group. Due to a fee issue, the attempt failed, and Bon-Ton liquidated.

== List of properties ==
Mall properties owned or managed by Namdar Realty Group as of 2026 include:

- Acadiana Mall, Lafayette, Louisiana
- Bangor Mall, Bangor, Maine
- Berkshire Mall, Wyomissing, Pennsylvania
- Cache Valley Mall, Logan, Utah
- Central Mall, Fort Smith, Arkansas
- Chambersburg Mall, Chambersburg, Pennsylvania
- Chapel Hills Mall, Colorado Springs, Colorado
- The Citadel, Colorado Springs, Colorado
- College Square Mall, Cedar Falls, Iowa
- Country Club Mall, Cumberland, Maryland
- Crossroads Mall, Beckley, West Virginia
- Concord Mall, Wilmington, Delaware
- Destiny USA, Syracuse, New York
- Eastdale Mall, Montgomery, Alabama
- Florence Mall, Florence, Kentucky
- Ford City Mall, Chicago, Illinois
- The Gallery at South DeKalb, Decatur, Georgia
- Genesee Valley Center, Flint Township, Michigan
- Grand Traverse Mall, Garfield Township, Grand Traverse County, Michigan
- Gulf View Square, Port Richey, Florida
- Hamilton Mall, Mays Landing, New Jersey
- Heritage Mall, Albany, Oregon
- Hickory Point Mall, Forsyth, Illinois
- Jackson Crossing, Jackson, Michigan
- The Lakes Mall, Muskegon, Michigan
- Logan Valley Mall, Altoona, Pennsylvania
- Louis Joliet Mall, Joliet, Illinois
- Marley Station Mall, Glen Burnie, Maryland
- Meriden Mall, Meriden, Connecticut
- Merritt Square Mall, Merritt Island, Florida
- Mesilla Valley Mall, Las Cruces, New Mexico
- Newburgh Mall, Newburgh, New York
- Nittany Mall, State College, Pennsylvania
- North Hanover Mall, Hanover, Pennsylvania
- Northfield Square Mall, Bourbonnais, Illinois
- River Oaks Mall, Calumet City, Illinois
- River Valley Mall, Lancaster, Ohio
- The Shoppes at Buckland Hills, Manchester, Connecticut
- The Shops at Ithaca Mall, Ithaca, New York
- Sierra Vista Mall, Clovis, California
- South Park Mall, San Antonio, Texas
- South Shore Mall, Bay Shore, New York
- Southland Mall, Memphis, Tennessee
- Stonecrest Marketplace, Lithonia, Georgia
- Sunrise Mall, Citrus Heights, California
- Southland Mall, Hayward, California
- Trumbull Mall, Trumbull, Connecticut
- Uniontown Mall, Uniontown, Pennsylvania
- University Mall, Carbondale, Illinois
- Voorhees Town Center, Voorhees Township, New Jersey
- Wenatchee Valley Mall, East Wenatchee, Washington
- West Valley Mall, Tracy, California
- Westgate Mall, Amarillo, Texas
- Westland Center, Westland, Michigan
- Willow Grove Park Mall, Willow Grove, Pennsylvania
- Wiregrass Commons Mall, Dothan, Alabama

== See also ==
- Kohan Retail Investment Group, a similar company
