= Cache Valley Mall =

Coordinates: 41.755601°N 111.832274°W

- Location: Logan, Utah
- Address: 1300 North Main Street
- Opened: July 29, 1976
- Closed: April 1, 2024
- Demolished: April 2024
- Owner: Namdar Realty Group
- Num. of stores: 0
- Num. of anchor tenants: 3
- Floor area: 300,000 square feet (28,000 m^{2})
- Floors: 1
- Website: cachevalleymall.com

Cache Valley Mall was a shopping mall located in Logan, Utah that opened on July 29, 1976 and closed on April 1, 2024; demolition began later that month. The mall had three anchors last occupied by C-A-L Ranch, Herberger's and JCPenney. The mall site was owned by Namdar Realty Group.

== History ==
The mall was in planning as early as 1972, when the Logan City Commission refused to rezone land for the mall, leading to the developers bringing a lawsuit against the commission. Plans re-emerged in 1974, with developers John Price Associates announcing it as a 300,000 square foot mall to include 3 department store anchors, a supermarket, a bank, and "dozens" of small businesses, with an opening date sometime in 1976. Construction had begun by 1975, with anchors JCPenney, ZCMI, and Ernst-Malmo (later specified as Ernst Home Center) announced at this time. An opening of late July 1976 was announced by February that year, with additional tenants including Logan Savings and Loan, Karmelkorn, Kinney Shoes, and J.B.'s Big Boy. A 14-year-old girl was shot in the chest on the mall property on July 19, 1976, before recovering.

The Ernst Home Center opened for business before the mall on July 20, 1976. The mall proper opened on July 29, 1976, with anchors Ernst Home Center (37,000 sq ft), ZCMI (61,000 sq ft), and JCPenney (47,000 sq ft) along with a supermarket, a drug store, a First Security Bank, and an outparcel 3-screen Mann Theatre. By 1979, Ernst had moved out of the mall and was replaced by Bon Marche.

In 1988, the Bon Marche at the mall was bought by and converted to Lamonts. ZCMI was sold to The May Department Stores Company in 1999, with the store at the mall being sold to Dillard's in 2001. Lamonts was sold to Gottschalks in 2000, before closing in 2001. The store was later replaced by Dillard's Home Store.

In January 2013 it was announced that both Dillard's locations would close, citing under-performance. Herberger's opened at the mall in early 2014, their first location in Utah, in the former Dillard's space. C-A-L Ranch opened at the mall in the former Dillard's Home Store space in 2015. The mall was sold from Rouse Properties to Namdar Realty Group in December 2017. Herberger's closed at the mall in 2018, in a round of 42 store closures prior to bankruptcy later that year. In 2019, the former Cache Valley Mall 3 Theatres building underwent heavy renovations to become two restaurants and an event center, with a projected opening date of Spring 2020. On June 4, 2020, JCPenney announced that it would be closing as part of a plan to close 154 stores nationwide. The store closed on October 18, 2020. On January 22, 2021, it was announced that C-A-L Ranch would be relocating to the former Kmart space in North Logan in spring 2021, which will leave the mall with no anchors left.

In 2023, redevelopment plans for the mall site were announced, to include a 150,000 square foot Target store, 346 multi-family residential units, and a 156-room hotel. The mall officially closed on April 1, 2024. Demolition began later in April, and was expected to last for several months.
