= College Square Mall (Iowa) =

- Location: Cedar Falls, Iowa, U.S.
- Coordinates: 42°30′39″N 92°26′4″W
- Address: 6301 University Avenue
- Opened: 1969
- Developer: General Management
- Owner: Jon Davis
- Architect: Derwood Quade
- Num. of stores: 50+
- Num. of anchor tenants: 4
- Floor area: 552,884 square feet (51,364.6 m^{2})
- Floors: 1
- Public transit: 6 7 MET Transit

College Square Mall is a shopping mall in Cedar Falls, Iowa, United States. Built in 1969, the mall features Ashley Furniture, Hy-Vee, Planet Fitness, and Von Maur as its anchor stores. It is owned and managed by local businessman Jon Davis.

== History ==
College Square Mall began construction in 1968. It was developed by Cedar Rapids, Iowa-based General Management, later known as General Growth Properties. The developers chose a site on University Avenue (then U.S. Route 218), southeast of downtown Cedar Falls, Iowa. At the time of its construction, College Square was the largest mall in the state of Iowa, with approximately 600,000 square feet (56,000 m^{2}) of retail space. The original anchor stores were Woolco, Montgomery Ward, and Younkers. The mall officially opened on November 12, 1969. Opening day ceremonies included a ribbon cutting hosted by the then-mayors of Cedar Falls and nearby Waterloo. The Montgomery Ward store, at 130,000 square feet (12,000 m^{2}), was the largest in Iowa at the time.

Brothers Matthew and Martin Bucksbaum, then respectively the president and chairman of General Management, worked with a number of people to develop the mall. These included leasing agent Dan Bergeron and architect Derwood Quade. Martin also served as financial manager. Among the first stores to open were Zales Jewelers, Woolworth, Maurices clothing store, Kinney Shoes, Marc's Big Boy, Baskin-Robbins, and Jo-Ann Fabrics.

=== After opening ===
General Growth attempted to sell ten malls under its ownership, including College Square, in 1980 in order to pay off mortgages. This sale was initially halted by a lawsuit filed against the Bucksbaum brothers by owners of a pension fund who had interest in General Growth. After this was settled out of court, General Growth sold College Square and the other nine malls to Aetna Life Insurance and The Rouse Company for $91,000,000. Six of the other nine were located in Iowa, while one each were in Colorado, Arkansas, and Texas. The mall had no significant changes in tenancy until 1982, when Woolworth closed all of its Woolco locations. Despite this, the company still managed the Woolworth and Kinney Shoes stores under its ownership at the time.

The vacated Woolco was replaced by Walmart in late 1984. Several other chain stores joined the mall this year, including Casual Corner, Brauns Fashions, and Musicland. The mall also attracted customers by holding concerts in center court every Sunday, and by starting a mall walking program. Montgomery Ward closed the College Square Mall store in late 1985 due to declining sales. Younkers moved into the former location of Montgomery Ward soon afterward. This move gave Younkers an additional 23,500 square feet (2,180 m^{2}) over its previous location.

This move also allowed the original location of Younkers to become Petersen Harned Von Maur (now just Von Maur), which began renovating the space with a targeted opening date of 1987. Mall management had begun negotiations with Von Maur prior to Montgomery Ward closing, and noted that plans for the store joining the mall were contingent on Montgomery Ward's closure and Younkers's relocation. A $10,000,000 renovation plan started in 1984 and ended in 1987 to accompany the changes in anchor stores. These included new signage, fountains, skylights, and planters. After the renovations, College Square was the second-largest employer in Cedar Falls.

=== 1990s onward ===
Rouse sold the mall to Chicago-based Landau & Heyman in 1998. Also sold in this transaction were four other Iowa malls: North Grand Mall in Ames, Westland Mall in West Burlington, Muscatine Mall in Muscatine, and Marshalltown Mall in Marshalltown. All four of these were also built by General Growth and sold to Rouse in 1980. Scheels All Sports joined the mall in 1999, relocating from a store at Black Hawk Village shopping center. The College Square store replaced the former location of a Walgreens drugstore and a shoe store, as well as one of the mall entrances. As a result, a new mall entrance was constructed adjacent to Younkers.

GK Development of Barrington, Illinois bought College Square Mall, Marshalltown Mall, North Grand Mall, and Westland Mall from Landau & Heyman in December 2004 for a total of $120,000,000. Walmart moved out of the mall in 2003 prior to GK Development's purchase. In late 2005, the space was remodeled for a Hy-Vee supermarket, replacing an existing location nearby. The opening of Hy-Vee coincided with a second renovation plan completed by GK Development in 2006. This included new flooring and lighting, as well as renovated restrooms and the opening of a Hy-Vee supermarket in the former location of Walmart.

=== Decline and store closures ===
The mall began losing tenants in the 2010s, especially following the Great Recession and the withdrawal of retailers such as Gap from the market. These factors also impacted Crossroads Mall in nearby Waterloo, Iowa, creating a surplus of retail space in the market. Decline in tenancy increased in 2013 after the relocation of Scheels All Sports. Despite this closure, Planet Fitness replaced Scheels that year. In addition, the mall was sold to Namdar Realty Group of Great Neck, New York.

College Square has seen a further decline in tenancy under the ownership of Namdar, including the closure of Younkers due to bankruptcy in 2018. Ashley Furniture opened in the former location of Younkers in 2021. In 2026, the franchise owner of the neighboring Slumberland Furniture purchased the mall from Namdar with plans to revitalize it.
