= Wiregrass Commons Mall =

- Location: Dothan, Alabama, USA
- Coordinates: 31°15′14.54″N 85°25′27.95″W
- Opened: August 6, 1986
- Developer: Jim Wilson & Associates
- Manager: Namdar Realty Group
- Owner: Namdar Realty Group
- Num. of stores: 70
- Num. of anchor tenants: 4
- Floor area: 638,554 square feet (59,000 m^{2})
- Floors: 1 (2 in Dillard's)
- Website: shopwiregrasscommonsmall.com

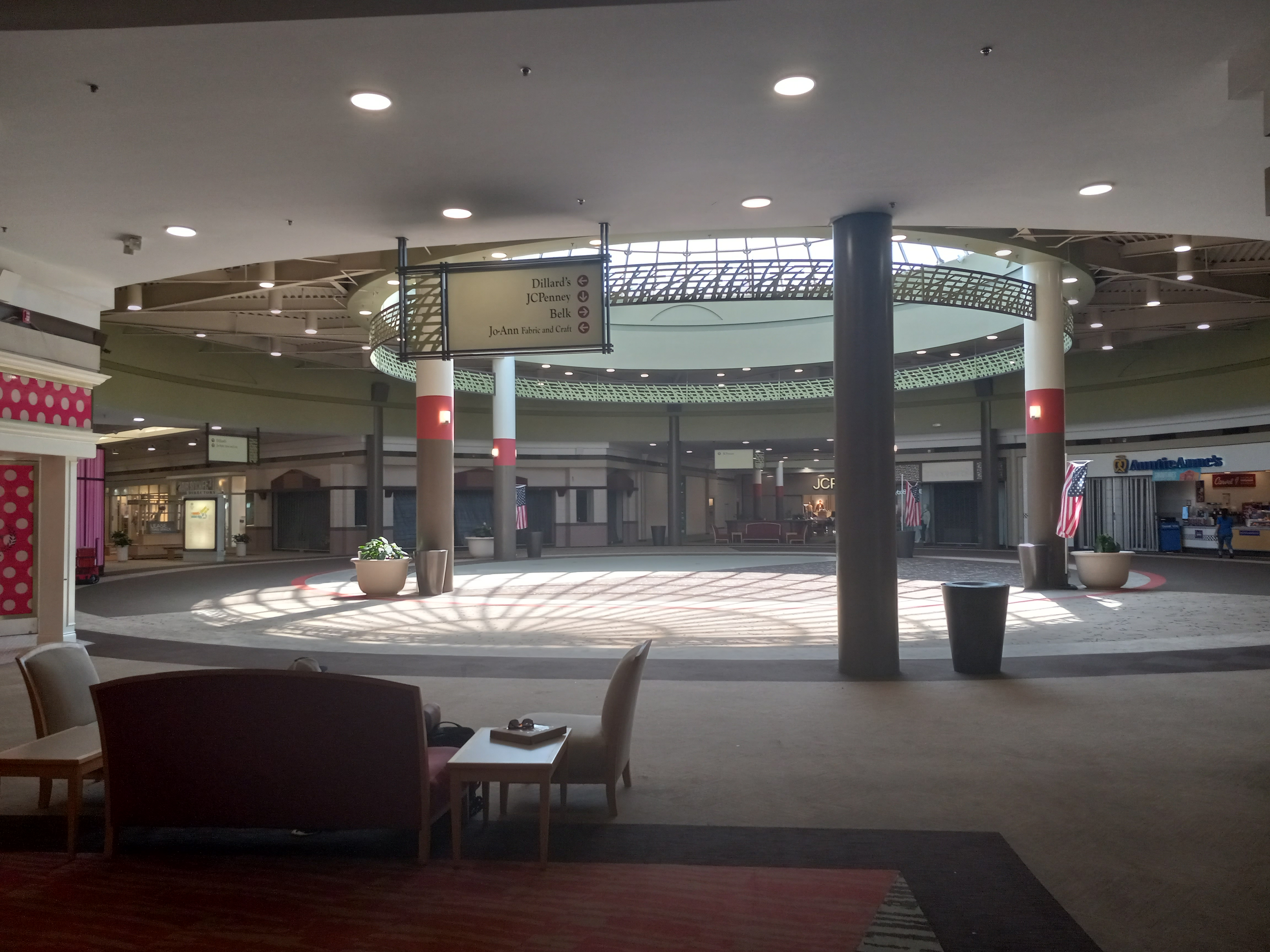
Center Court

Wiregrass Commons Mall is an enclosed shopping mall located in Dothan, Alabama. It has 638,554 square feet (59,000 m^{2}) of shopping with over fifty retail stores and a food court with a carousel. It is Southeast Alabama's largest and only shopping mall. The mall's anchor tenants are Belk, Dillard's, and JCPenney.

== History ==
Wiregrass Commons Mall opened on August 6, 1986. The original anchors were Gayfers, Parisian, and McRae's. With the opening of Wiregrass Commons, the Porter Square Mall located near downtown Dothan closed. The mall was renovated in 2008 with an expansion to the Belk store, carpeting of the mall, removal of the fountain in center court, new lighting, and outside directional signs. CBL & Associates Properties took over management of the mall from PREIT in April 2016. A Sephora location opened in JCPenney in June 2016. Victoria's Secret & Pink opened a larger store in center court in July 2017.

In August 2018, Wiregrass Commons Mall was sold to Namdar Realty Group based out of New York.

The mall is located at the intersection of US 231/Ross Clark Circle in northwest Dothan.
