= Fort Worth missing trio =

Unsolved 1974 disappearance of three girls in Texas

Coordinates: 32°41′11″N 97°19′31″W

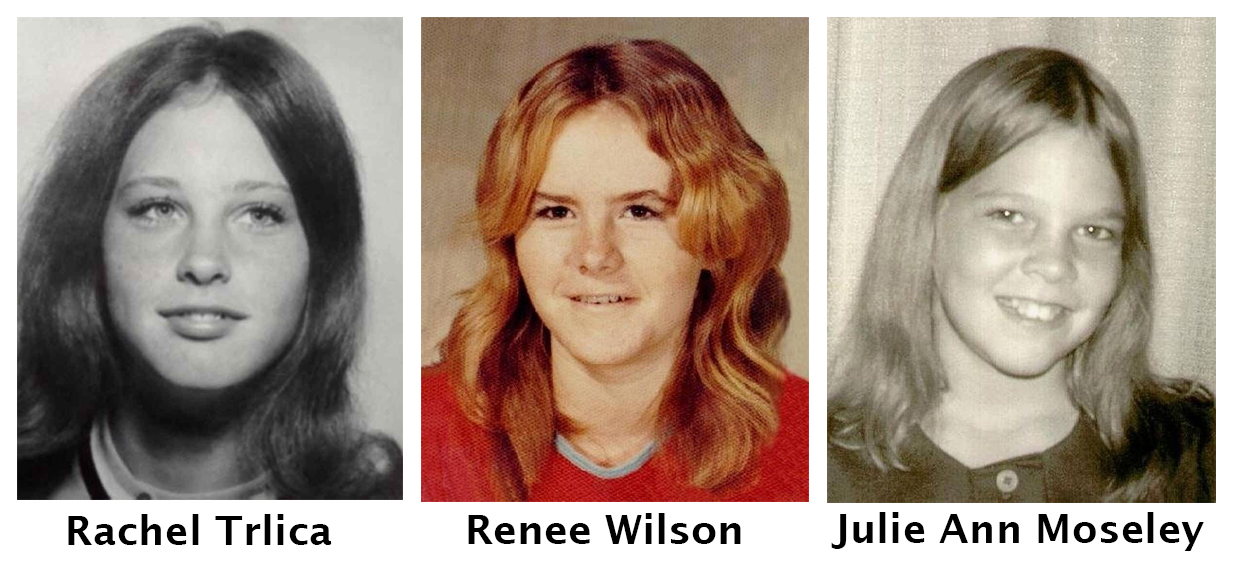
- Date: December 23, 1974
- Duration: Missing for 51 years, 8 months and 2 days
- Location: Seminary South Shopping Center, Fort Worth, Texas, U.S.
- Type: Disappearance
- Missing: Mary Rachel Trlica; Lisa Renee Wilson; Julie Ann Moseley

The Fort Worth missing trio refers to an unsolved missing persons case in which three girls – Mary Rachel Trlica, Lisa Renee Wilson, and Julie Ann Moseley – went missing while shopping at the Seminary South Shopping Center in Fort Worth, Texas, on December 23, 1974. The car the girls were driving was left behind in the parking lot at the mall; the girls have not been seen since.

Thousands of leads have been followed, dozens of searches completed and hundreds of people interviewed. All attempts to find the girls have been unsuccessful.

== Victims ==
The oldest of the girls, Mary Rachel Trlica (née Arnold), who went by her middle name Rachel, was age 17 at the time of her disappearance. She is a white female who was 5 feet 6 inches (1.68 m) tall and weighed 108 pounds (49 kg), with long brown hair, green eyes, a chipped upper front tooth, and a small scar on her chin. She was a married high school student at Southwest High School in Fort Worth and drove a 1972 Oldsmobile 98, the car the girls took to the mall on the day of the disappearance. At the time, Rachel had been married to her husband, Tommy Trlica, for about six months, and wore a wedding ring.

Lisa Renee Wilson was a 14-year old ninth grader at the time of her disappearance who went by her middle name of Renee. She is a fair-skinned white female who was 5 feet 2 inches (1.57 m) tall and weighed 110 pounds (50 kg), with light wavy brown hair, brown eyes, and a scar on the inside of one thigh. She was wearing bluish-purple hip hugger pants, a white pullover sweatshirt with "Sweet Honesty" in green letters (some have reported it as a pale yellow T-shirt with green letters), red and white Oxford shoes, and a promise ring with a single clear stone.

The youngest of the girls, Julie Ann Moseley, was age 9 at the time of her disappearance. She is a white female who was 4 feet 3 inches (1.30 m) tall and weighed 85 pounds (39 kg), with shoulder-length sandy blonde hair and blue eyes. She has a small scar under her left eye, a scar in the middle of her forehead and a scar on the back of her calf. She was wearing a red shirt with dark jeans and red tennis shoes when she disappeared.

== Disappearance ==
Shortly before noon on December 23, 1974, Rachel Trlica, Renee Wilson, and Julie Ann Moseley set out to go Christmas shopping. Moseley asked to tag along at the last minute because she "didn't want to spend the day alone". On being told she needed permission from her parents, Moseley ran inside her home and asked her mother, Rayanne Moseley, if she could tag along. Moseley would later recall: "I was working for an electrical contractor, and my husband and I were separated. It was a bitter, bitter time. I remember that Julie called and wanted to go to Seminary South. I said, 'No. You don't have any money. You just stay home.' I knew Renee and her mother, but I really didn't know Rachel. But she [Julie] kept whining about how she wouldn't have anybody to play with. I finally gave in, but I told her to be home by six." The older girls, specifically Renee, wanted to be back by 4:00 p.m. because Renee had a Christmas party to attend with her new boyfriend, who had given her a promise ring that morning, and she wanted plenty of time to get ready.

The girls first headed to a surplus store in Fort Worth to pick up some layaway items that Renee had waiting, then to the Seminary South Shopping Center. Several witnesses reported seeing the girls in the mall that day. When the girls did not return home, their families became concerned and traveled to Seminary South to search for them. They arrived around 6:00 p.m. to find their car parked in the Sears upper-level parking lot. It appeared the girls returned to the car that afternoon, as the gifts they purchased were inside it. The family stayed at the mall all night waiting for the girls to return.

== Search and investigation ==
When the girls failed to turn up, the police were called and the case was quickly handed to the youth division of the Fort Worth Police Department's (FWPD) Missing Persons Bureau. The girls were presumed to be runaways by investigators. The next day, Tommy Trlica, Rachel's husband, received a letter that appeared to have been written by her. It read:

"I know I'm going to catch it, but we had to get away. We're going to Houston. See you in about a week. The car is in Sears' upper lot. Love, Rachel" [sic]

While the addressed envelope was written in pencil, the letter was written in ink on paper wider than the envelope. It was addressed to "Thomas A. Trlica" instead of the less-formal "Tommy" as Rachel normally called him. "Rachel," written in the upper left-hand corner of the envelope, appeared to be initially misspelled: the "l" was written as a lowercase “e”, but then had been gone over to form the correct "l". The postmark did not contain a city, only a blurred zip code that appeared to be "76083"; the number "3" appeared to either be backward, as though applied by a hand-loaded stamp, or a partial "8". It is assumed that the zip code was meant to be either 76038, which comes from Eliasville, Texas, or 76088, which comes from Weatherford, Texas. In subsequent decades, handwriting experts across the nation, including from the Federal Bureau of Investigation (FBI), have yielded inconclusive results as to the legitimacy of the letter.

The girls' families did not believe the letter was written by Rachel or that the girls ran away. Julie Ann Moseley's mother Rayanne stated, "I know my daughter and I know those other girls and they are not runaways." Renee's mother Judy Wilson stated: "I could have told you that night that they didn't run away. [Renee] wanted to go to that party. And no nine-year-old is going to run off two days before Christmas. Everybody knows that!" Frances Langston, Rachel's mother, believed the girls were abducted, saying, "A lot of people may think they left with someone they knew, but I'll always think – until the day I die – that the girls were taken."

Not willing to give in, the families continued their search by distributing missing person fliers through the state and contacting newspapers across the country. Eventually, tips began to come in and witnesses began to come forward. In early 1975, a young man claiming to be Rachel's acquaintance stated that he saw the three girls in the record department of a store in the mall just before they disappeared. Apparently, he and Rachel saw each other and spoke briefly. The man claimed that another person appeared to be with the girls. During this same time, some women's clothes were found in Justin, Texas, but it was determined that they did not belong to the girls.

Frustrated with the police investigation, the families hired private detective Jon Swaim. In August 1975, Swaim discovered that a 28-year-old man, who had worked for a local store where Rachel had applied for a job before her disappearance, was making a string of obscene phone calls in the area. It was discovered that the man was using his position to obtain information from young women who had submitted job applications or been listed as references. Six female job applicants received obscene phone calls. The man also once lived in the neighborhood of Rachel's parents but moved away shortly before Rachel married. In the end, nothing came of the investigation into this suspect.

In April 1975, Swaim went to Port Lavaca, Texas with 100 volunteers to search under local bridges after receiving a tip that the girls had been killed and taken there. However, no trace of the girls was found. A year later, an oil drilling crew found three skeletons in a field in Brazoria County. Swaim had the bones compared to x-rays and dental records of the girls, but the bones belonged to a teenage boy about 15 to 17 years of age and two other females who were not any of the girls. In March 1976, a psychic called one family and told them that the girls could be found near an oil well. For unclear reasons, the searchers focused on the small community of Rising Star, Texas, but nothing was ever found.

In 1979, Swaim died following a drug overdose; his death was ruled to be suicide. Upon his death, he ordered that all of his files on the case be destroyed.

In the spring of 1981, police investigators were called to a location in Brazoria County after human remains had been found in a swampy area. After a month of investigation, they discovered that the bones did not belong to the three girls.

In January 2001, the case was reopened and assigned to a homicide detective, Tom Boetcher, who believes the girls left the mall with someone they trusted: "We can say that they were at one point seen with one individual, but we believe there was more than one involved."

In 2018, two cars were raised from Benbrook Lake because they were thought to have a connection to the case. These efforts, however, yielded no results.

Over the years, investigators have continued to comb through Texas and have explored hundreds of back roads. The families have walked creek beds and country roads, coming up with nothing every time. Decades after the disappearance, there have been no reports of new developments in the case.

== Other possible witnesses ==
A store clerk came forward around the time of the girls' disappearance and said that a woman told her that she had seen the girls at the mall that day being forced into a yellow pickup truck near Buddies grocery store at the mall. The truck was described as having lights on top of it. This witness could never be located by police, and the story was never verified.

In 1981, years after the disappearance, a man said he had been in the parking lot that day and had seen a man forcing a girl into a van. The man in the van told him it was a family dispute and to stay out of it.

In April 2001, Bill Hutchins, a former Fort Worth police officer and security guard at the Seminary South Sears outlet, said that he saw the three girls with a security guard on the night they disappeared.

== See also ==
- List of people who disappeared mysteriously: 1910–1970
- Springfield Three – unsolved 1992 case of a mother, her daughter, and a friend disappearing in Missouri
- Yuba County Five – 1978 case of deaths and disappearances in California
