= The Shoppes at Buckland Hills =

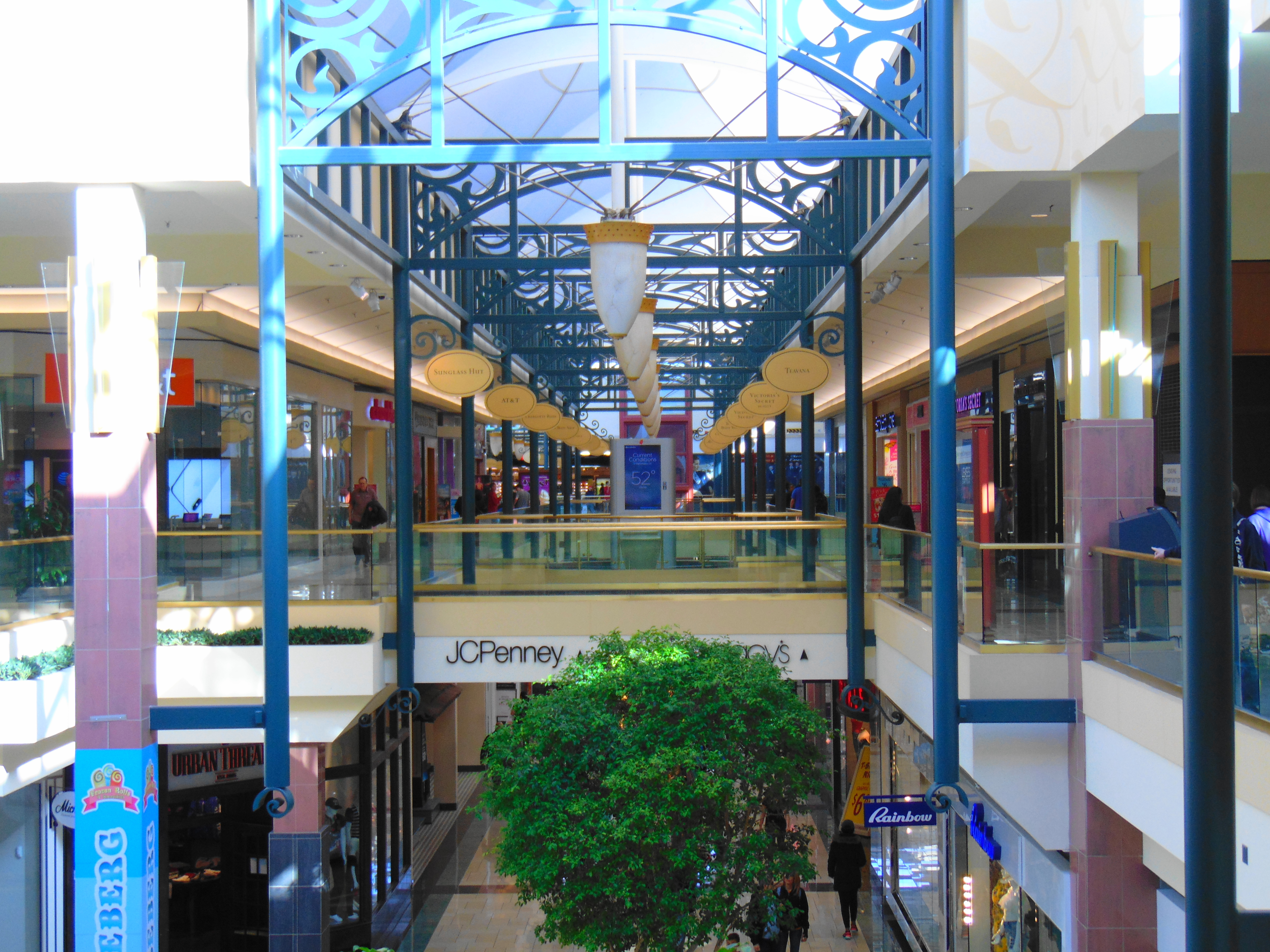
- Mall interior, 2018
- Location: Manchester, Connecticut
- Coordinates: 41°48′25″N 72°32′43″W
- Opened: March 14, 1990
- Developer: Homart Development Company
- Manager: Namdar Realty Group
- Owner: Namdar Realty Group
- Num. of stores: 107
- Num. of anchor tenants: 6 (4 open, 2 vacant)
- Floor area: 1,082,708 sq ft (100,587 m^{2})
- Website: www.theshoppesatbucklandhills.com

The Shoppes at Buckland Hills, formerly Buckland Hills Mall, is a shopping mall located in Manchester, Connecticut and is currently owned by Namdar Realty Group. The mall features the traditional retailers Macy's, JCPenney, and Barnes & Noble while featuring prominent specialty retailers such as Aeropostale, Charlotte Russe, Express, Forever 21, H&M, Build-A-Bear, Newbury Comics, and Windsor.

The Shoppes at Buckland Hills is located off I-84, near the intersection of I-291.

== History ==
John Finguerra, with his business partner, Richard Ripps, planned the mall in 1972. Finguerra worked for JCPenney, which at the time had a 2,000,000-square-foot (190,000 m^{2}) warehouse nearby, once used for their now-defunct catalog business.

Finguerra's familiarity with local economic factors led him to believe that a regional mall would be successful. The location selected for the mall was elevated and overlooked a valley, and was close to an interstate highway, which would enable traffic flow to the mall, and future developments in the corridor.

The mall opened in March 1990 as the Pavilions at Buckland Hills.. The mall was successful, and new businesses in the surrounding area developed. It was eventually renamed the Buckland Hills Mall. A multimillion-dollar renovation and expansion of the mall was completed in October 2003, and the name was again changed to The Shoppes at Buckland Hills.

== Design/Tenants ==
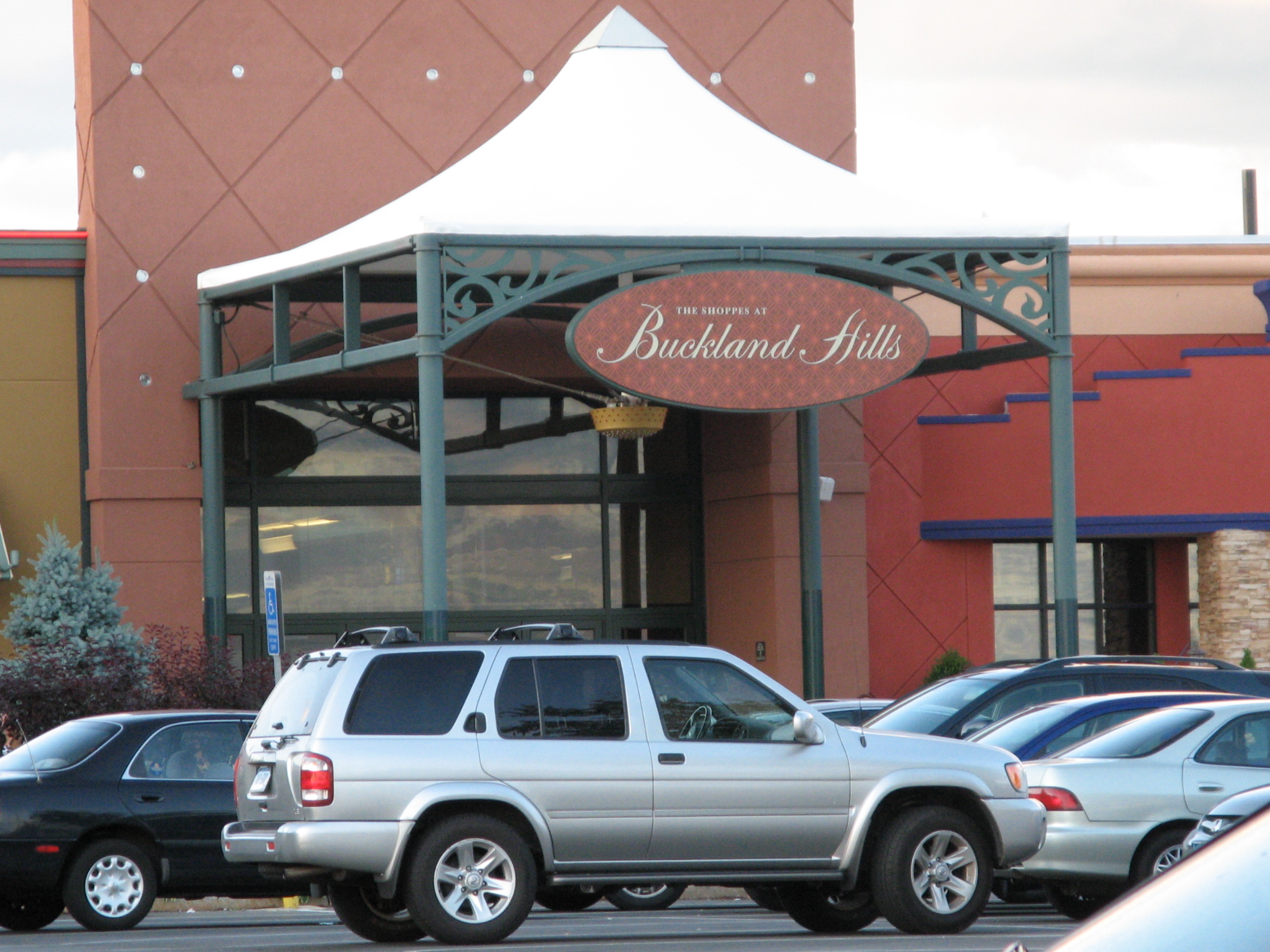
One of the mall's entrances

The main building has an area of 1,082,708 square feet (100,587 m^{2}) on two floors. However, the name "Buckland Hills Mall"' can informally refer to the mall plus the cluster of surrounding retail stores, hotels, and restaurants on the hill, totaling nearly 6,000,000 square feet (560,000 m^{2}) or 1/4 square mile.

There are approximately 145 shops and eateries in the mall, as well as four anchor stores, including Macy's (originally G. Fox, later Filene's), Macy's Men's, Children's, Juniors, and Furniture (originally Steiger's, later Lord & Taylor, then Filene's Men's, Children's, Juniors, and Furniture), JCPenney, which opened in 1992, and Barnes & Noble with two vacant anchors last occupied by Bob's Stores (originally Sage-Allen, later Dick's Sporting Goods) and Sears. In 2006, Newbury Comics opened its first Connecticut store inside the mall. There was once a D&L (Davidson & Leventhal) department store below the food court, which later became Filene's Men's Store and is now various shops and restaurants.

Sears closed on January 24, 2021.

In April 2021, Dick's Sporting Goods moved to a nearby shopping center. Their anchor store was remodeled to contain two stores, Bob's Stores and Eastern Mountain Sports. Bob's Stores opened on November 23, 2022, but closed in September 2024. The closure also caused the Eastern Mountain Sports expansion to be abandoned.

The mall was sold to Namdar Realty Group in January 2025.
