= Mesilla Valley Mall =

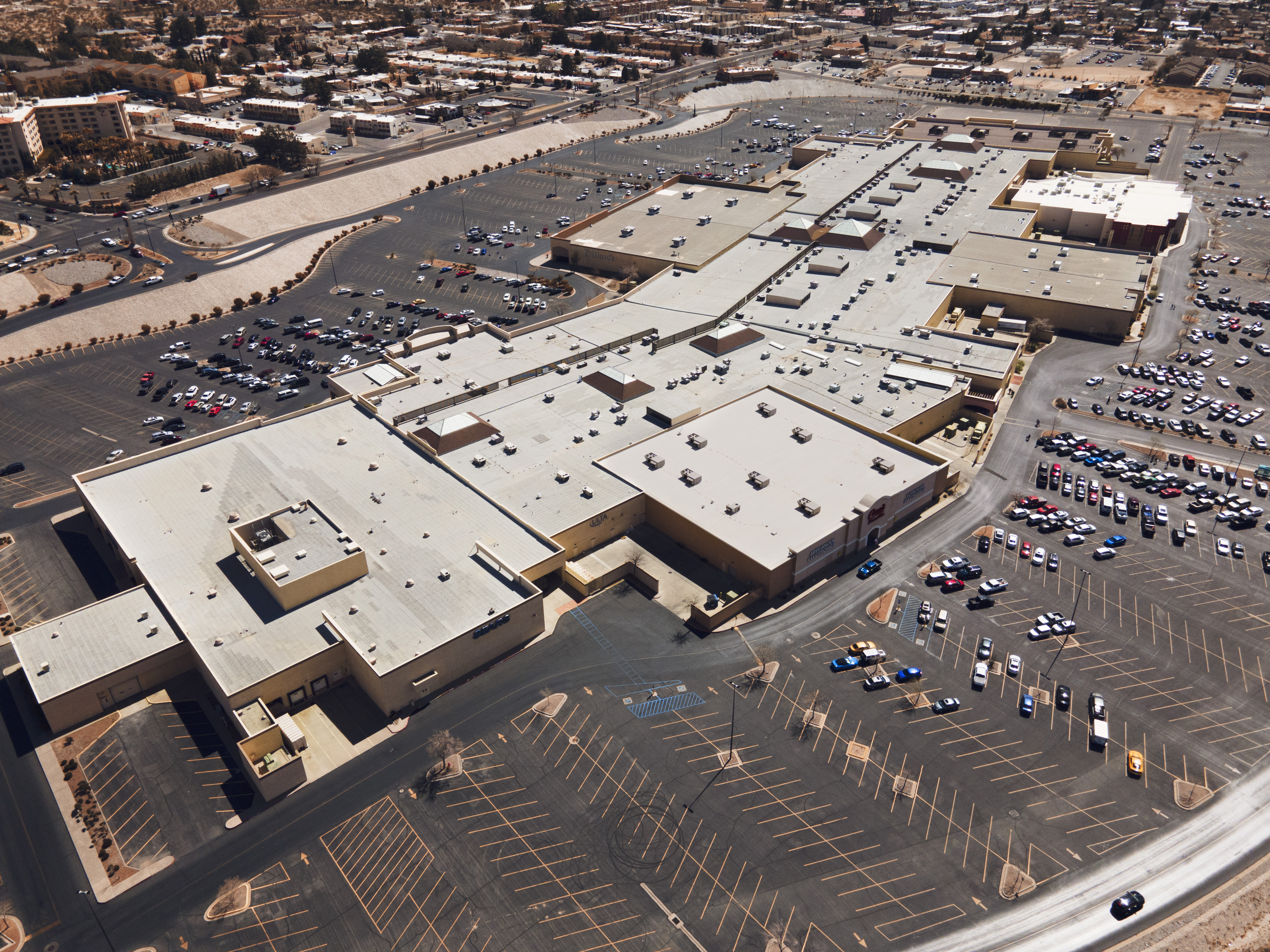
- Aerial view of the mall, March 2021
- Location: Las Cruces, New Mexico, United States
- Coordinates: 32.310°N 106.743°W
- Opened: July 29, 1981; 45 years ago
- Developer: Paul Broadhead
- Manager: Namdar Realty Group
- Owner: Namdar Realty Group
- Num. of stores: 85
- Num. of anchor tenants: 5
- Floor area: 602,150 square feet (55,942 m^{2})
- Floors: 1
- Parking: 4,500 spaces
- Website: mesillavalleymall.com

Mesilla Valley Mall is a 602,150-square-foot (55,942 m^{2}) shopping mall located on 77.4 acres (31.3 ha) in Las Cruces, New Mexico, United States. It is managed by Namdar Realty Group. Opened in 1981, the indoor shopping center has 85 stores.

Mesilla Valley Mall was developed by Paul Broadhead and opened on July 29, 1981. The mall is the only regional mall in southern New Mexico, with a trade area encompassing 66 zip codes in Southern New Mexico and West Texas.

On August 31, 2019, it was announced that Sears would be closing this location a part of a plan to close 92 stores nationwide. The store closed in December 2019.

In 2024, Conn’s Home Plus filed for chapter 11 bankruptcy protection and announced the closure of 71 Conn’s Home Plus stores. The store closed in late 2024.

After Sears closed, Household Furniture, a furniture store, announced that they would open utilizing the entirety of the former Sears anchor space. The furniture store opened in 2026.

== Anchor stores ==
- JCPenney
- Dillard's
- Barnes & Noble
- Household Furniture
- Cineport 10 Theatre
