= Acadiana Mall =

Shopping mall in Lafayette, Louisiana

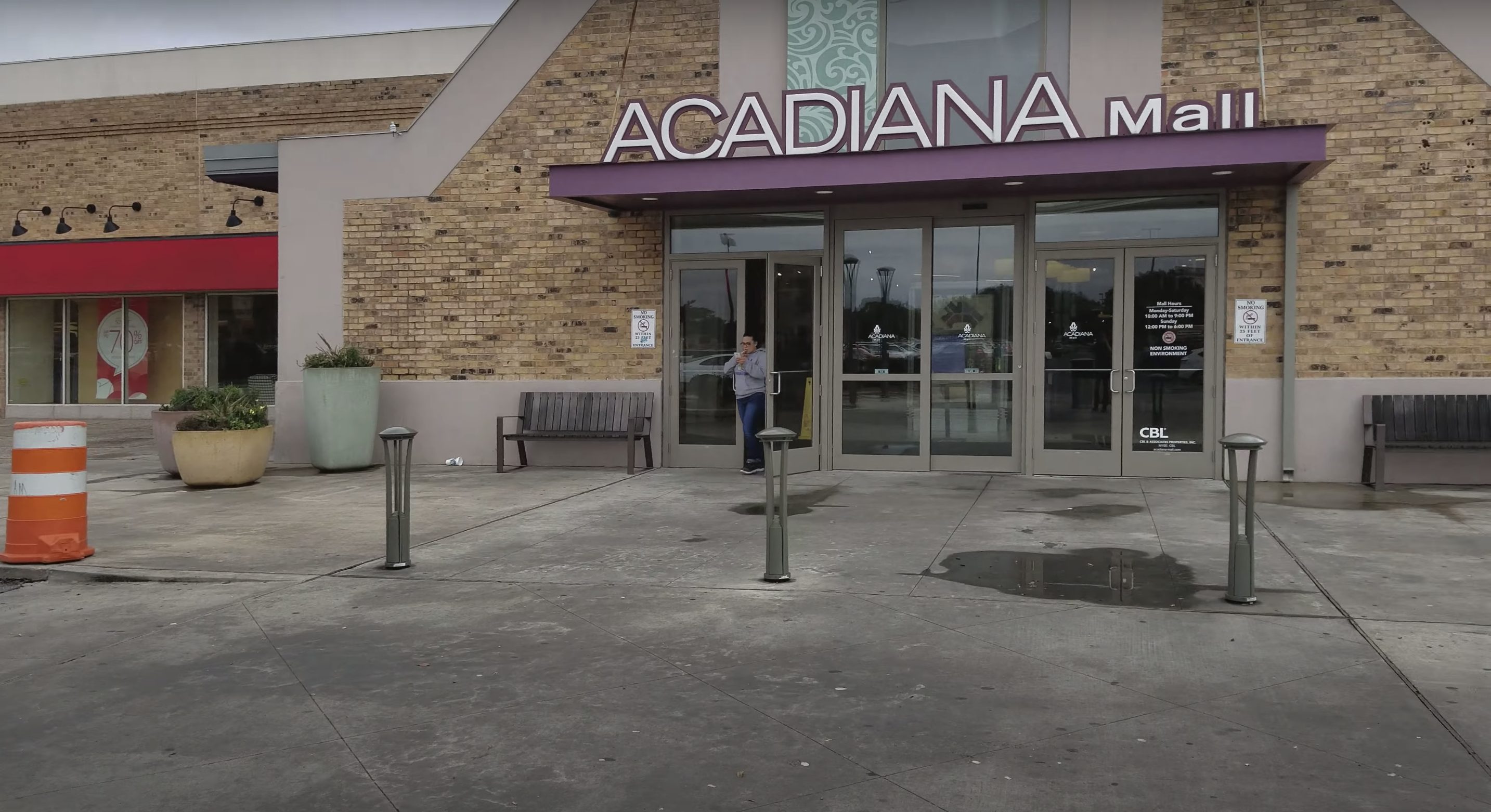
- An entrance to the mall in 2019
- Location: Lafayette, Louisiana
- Coordinates: 30°10′17″N 92°04′33″W
- Address: 5725 Johnston Street
- Opened: March 28, 1979 (47 years ago)
- Previous names: The Mall of Acadiana (2004–2013)
- Developer: Dwight Andrus Development, Robert B. Aikens & Associates, and Homart Development Company
- Owner: Namdar Realty Group
- Num. of stores: 101
- Num. of anchor tenants: 4 (2 open, 2 vacant)
- Floor area: 991,847 square feet (92,145.6 m^{2})
- Floors: 1 (2 in JCPenney, former Macy's, and former Sears, 3 in Dillard's)
- Website: shopacadianamall.com

Acadiana Mall (French: Centre commercial de l’Acadiana) is an enclosed regional shopping mall in the city of Lafayette, Louisiana, located at the intersection of Johnston Street (U.S. Route 167) and Ambassador Caffery Parkway (Louisiana Highway 3073). The mall is owned by Namdar Realty Group and houses two department store anchors (Dillard's and JCPenney).

== History ==
Plans for the Acadiana Mall, developed by Dwight Andrus Development, Robert B. Aikens & Associates, and Homart Development Company, were first unveiled in 1977. Construction began that year, and the mall opened on March 28, 1979, featuring Sears, Goudchaux's, Selber Bros., and D. H. Holmes as anchor tenants.

In the late 1980s, D. H. Holmes was bought by Dillard's and Goudchaux's became Maison Blanche. By 1990, Selber Bros. had closed; that April, JCPenney announced that it would relocate to the Acadiana Mall from the Northgate Mall, with the former Selber's to be demolished to make way for a new, larger building. JCPenney opened on November 13, 1991, concurrently with the unveiling of a $5 million renovation of the mall. Maison Blanche was converted to Parisian in 1998, then to Foley's in 2001, then finally to Macy's in September 2006.

The mall underwent another renovation in 2004, bringing in a more contemporary look and a name change to The Mall of Acadiana. On February 21, 2013, the mall reverted to its original name.

In 2005, in the aftermath of Hurricane Katrina, the mall became the assembly-point and staging area for what became known as the Cajun Navy, which was credited with rescuing thousands of flood victims.

In 2015, Sears Holdings spun off 235 of its properties, including the Sears at Acadiana Mall, into Seritage Growth Properties. Sears closed in September 2017, leaving its site vacant. On June 4, 2020, it was announced that JCPenney would be closing as part of a plan to close 154 stores nationwide. However, this store was removed from the closing list on July 13, 2020.

On January 9, 2025, it was announced that Macy's store would be closing as part of a plan to close 66 stores nationwide. The store closed in March 2025, leaving Dillard's and JCPenney as the only anchors.
