= Louis Joliet Mall =

Shopping mall in Joliet, Illinois, United States

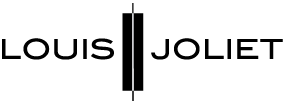

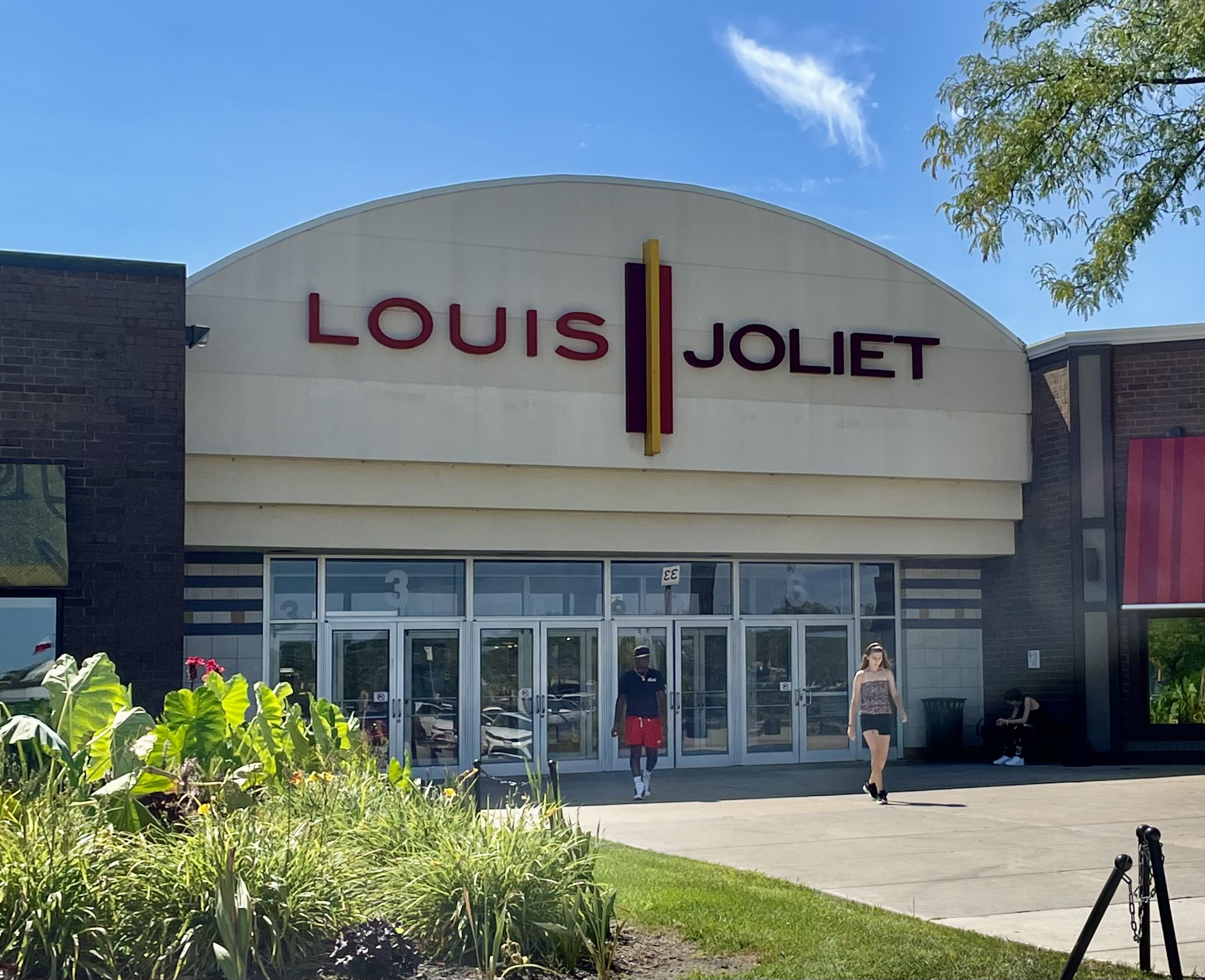
- Location: Joliet, Illinois, United States
- Address: 3340 Mall Loop Dr, Joliet, IL 60431
- Opened: August 2, 1978
- Previous names: Westfield Louis Joliet
- Developer: Homart Development Company
- Owner: Namdar Realty Group
- Architect: Architectonics, Inc.
- Num. of anchor tenants: 5 (3 open, 2 vacant)
- Floor area: 982,659 sq ft (91,292.0 m^{2})
- Floors: 1 (2 in Macy's, JCPenney, former Carson Pirie Scott, former Sears)
- Public transit: Pace
- Website: www.shoppinglouisjolietmall.com

Louis Joliet Mall is a shopping mall in Joliet, Illinois. Its anchor stores are JCPenney, Macy's (formerly Marshall Field's) and a Cinemark movie theater, along with two vacant anchors last occupied by Carson's and Sears. It used to have a TGI Fridays.

== History ==
Louis Joliet Mall opened in 1978 with anchor stores Sears and Marshall Field's. Bergner's and JCPenney were added to the mall in 1979. Homart Development Company, a subsidiary of Sears, financed construction with the structure being designed by Architectonics, Inc. The single story mall featured cathedral ceilings and atriums.

The mall barely escaped destruction in 1990 when the Plainfield Tornado passed within a few hundred yards of the southwest entrance. Some shoppers report seeing nothing but a huge, black wall when they looked to the southwest. In 1991, Circuit City opened outside of the mall. The chain went bankrupt in 2009. It was replaced by hhgregg in 2011. Six years later in 2017, hhgregg filed for bankruptcy as well. It was replaced by Binny's Beverage Depot in the fall of 2018.

In 2000, a Texas Roadhouse restaurant opened in the surrounding area.

Panera Bread opened at the mall in December 2000. Twenty-two years later, on August 30, 2022, the store closed.

A Hooters restaurant would officially open outside the mall in 2006.

The Marshall Field's store was officially renamed Macy's on September 9, 2006.

Cinemark officially opened at the mall on May 8, 2009.

Tilted Kilt opened in 2011, but closed in early 2017. On October 29, 2019, Cajun Boil & Bar opened in its former spot. A little over three years later, the space is vacant again after Cajun Boil & Bar shut down on February 7, 2023.

H&M and Pandora opened in December 2014.

In 2015, Sears Holdings spun off 235 of its properties, including the Sears at Louis Joliet Mall, into Seritage Growth Properties.

On February 16, 2017, MC Sports announced that all 66 stores would be closing. That same year, a Home2 Suites by Hilton hotel was built outside of the mall.

On April 18, 2018, it was announced that Carson's would close as the parent, Bon-Ton Stores, was going out of business. The store closed on August 29, 2018. On August 2, 2018, it was announced that the Senior Services of Will County might move into the former Bernger-Weise/Carson's space.

On October 15, 2018, it was announced that Sears would also be closing as part of a plan to close 142 stores nationwide. The store closed on January 6th, 2019 which left JCPenney, Macy's, and Cinemark as the only anchor stores left.

In February 2023, BrandX.com owned Carson's reopened.

In July 2023, the mall was sold to Namdar Realty Group for $31 million.

On December 23, 2024 the TGI Fridays closed.

In May 2025, Joliet Mayor Terry D'Arcy talked about revitalizing the Louis Joliet Mall corridor. This includes adding housing and places like a VNA clinic on Jefferson, St, a new Starbucks, a Burlington, and a proposed Jack in the Box.

A Tru by Hilton hotel opened in the surrounding area on June 12, 2025.

== Bus route ==
Pace: 507 Plainfield

== See also ==
- Starwood Capital Group – American private equity and investment firm
- Westfield Group – Australian shopping centre group
