= Berkshire Mall (Pennsylvania) =

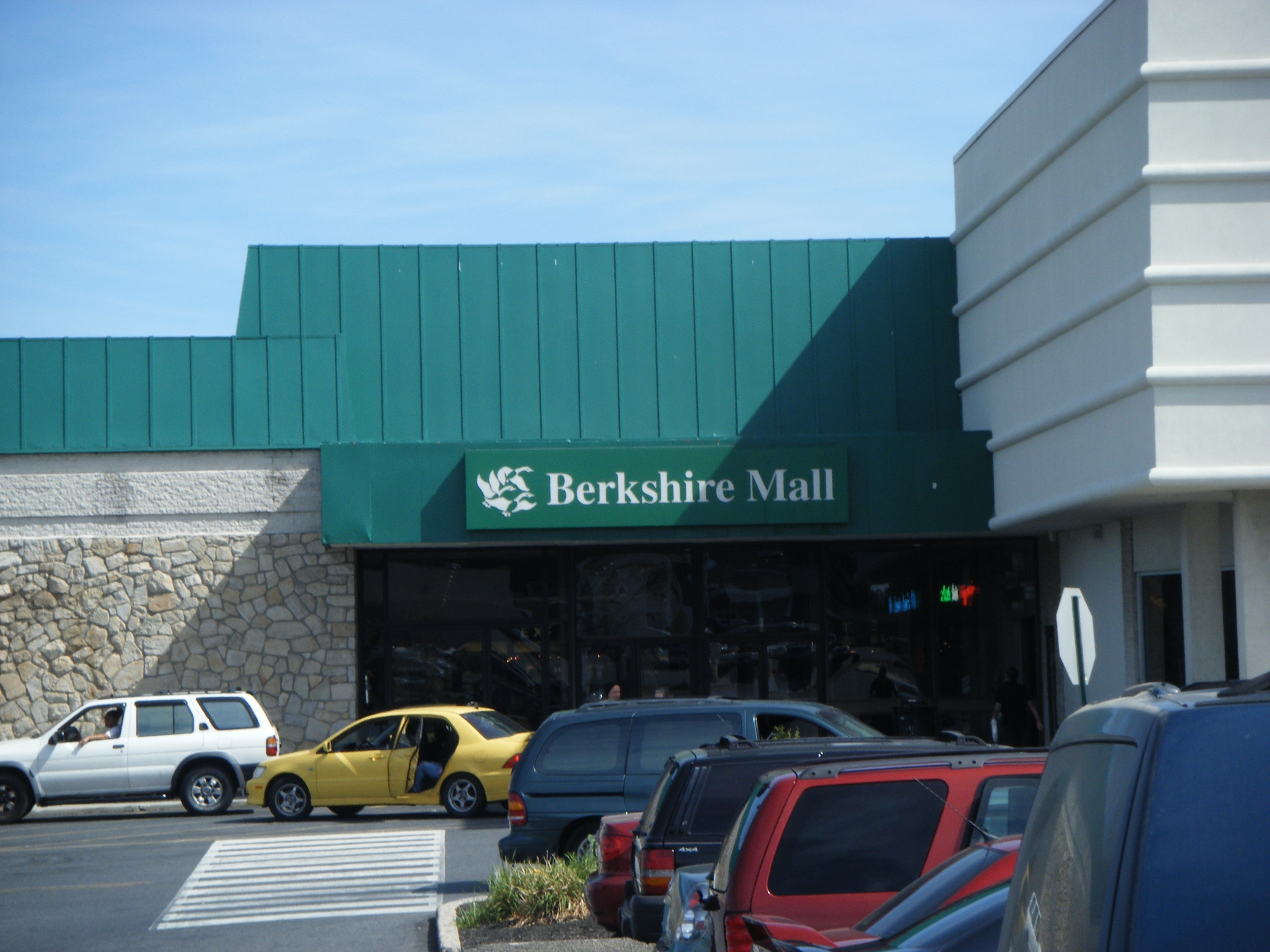
- North entrance to Berkshire Mall
- Location: Wyomissing, Pennsylvania, United States
- Coordinates: 40°20′29.45″N 75°58′13.03″W
- Address: 1665 State Hill Road
- Opened: February 10, 1970; 56 years ago
- Developer: Goodman Company
- Manager: Mason Asset Management
- Owner: Namdar Realty Group
- Num. of anchor tenants: 1
- Floor area: 910,000 square feet (85,000 m^{2})
- Floors: 1 with partial upper level (2 in former Sears and Bon-Ton, 3 in Boscov's)
- Parking: Parking lot
- Public transit: BARTA bus: 15
- Website: berkshiremall.com

Berkshire Mall is an enclosed shopping mall in Wyomissing, Pennsylvania, a suburb to the west of Reading in Berks County. Berkshire Mall is accessible from US 222/US 422 (Warren Street Bypass) at the Paper Mill Road interchange or the State Hill Road interchange. The main entrances to the mall are located along Woodland Road or State Hill Road. The mall first opened on February 10, 1970 and currently features Boscov's.

== History ==
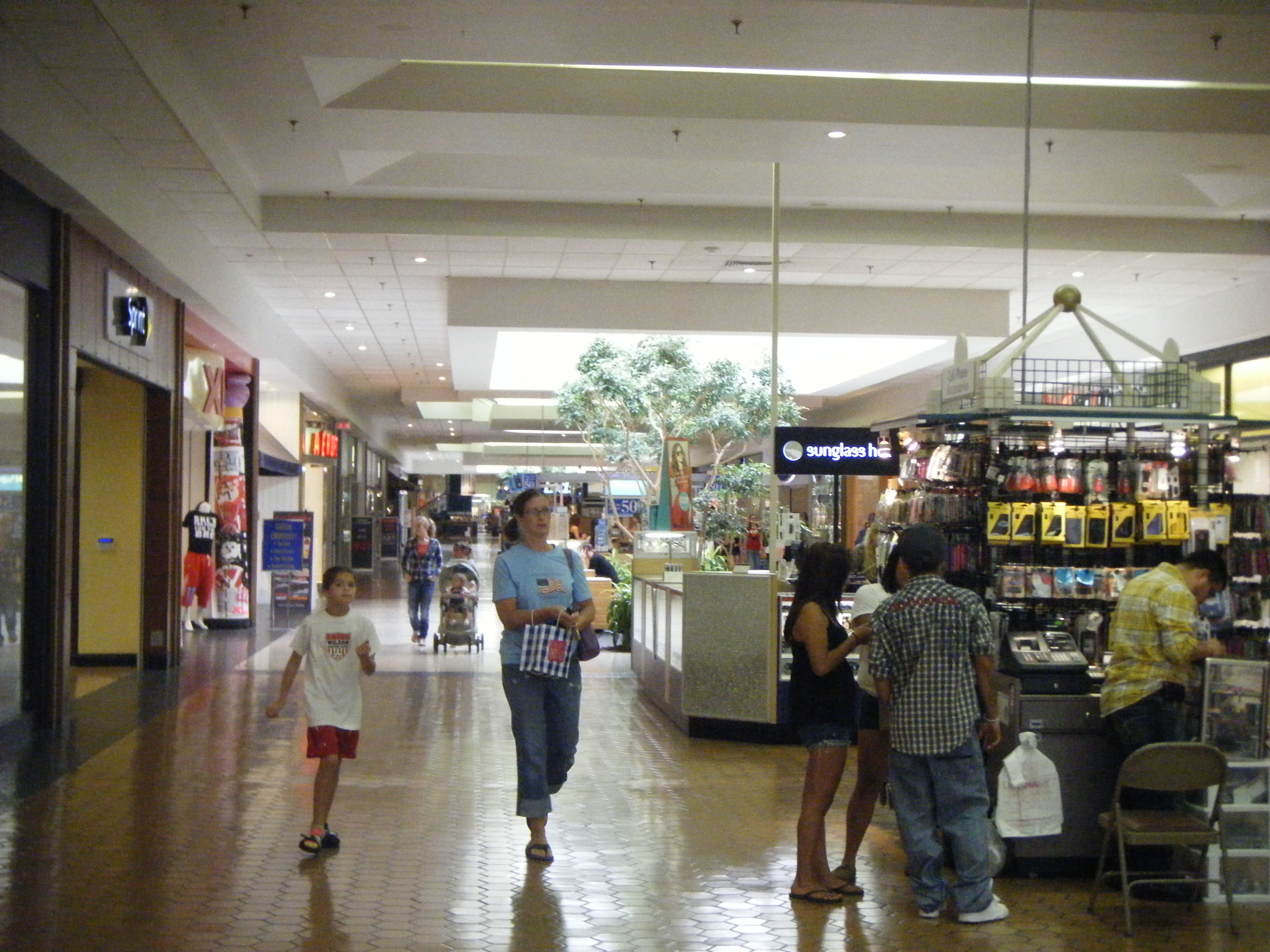
Berkshire Mall looking from Sears

Planning for the mall began in the late 1960s. Sears was announced to be the first major planned tenant in November 1967, to replace its nearby Shillington location which had opened in 1956. Construction got underway in 1968, with an "official" kickoff in November of that year. The mall opened in February 1970, and was the first enclosed shopping mall to open in eastern Pennsylvania outside of the Philadelphia area.

The mall's name is taken from the source of the name of Berks County, an abbreviation of the English royal county Berkshire. The old fountain in the center of the mall had been choreographed by local Reading company "Symphonic Fountains". An upper level food court, The Terrace Cafe, held its grand opening December 7–10, 1989. It replaced a Victorian themed mini-mall known simply as "Lamp Post Lane".

The original owner and developer of the mall was the Goodman Company, which sold the property to Equitable Real Estate Management in 1985. In July 2002, the mall was acquired by Allied Properties.

In January 2002, Boscov's purchased the Strawbridge's store, originally a Wanamaker's until 1995 and later Hecht's until 1996, at Berkshire Mall; the Boscov's store at Berkshire Mall opened in August 2002. The Boscov's store at Berkshire Mall replaced the Boscov's West store in Sinking Spring, which opened in November 1962.

On the night of November 2, 2009, a fire broke out in a display window of the Victoria's Secret store. Before firefighters could arrive, the sprinkler system activated in the store and the adjacent hallway. The store suffered smoke and water damage; everyone was evacuated safely without any reported injuries. On April 14, 2010, there was a fire inside of Boscov's. A worker was flown to Lehigh Valley Hospital–Cedar Crest in Allentown for severe burns to the face. Firefighters had controlled the fire in 30 minutes.

On January 12, 2011 according to leaked security footage, a mall patron fell head first into the fountain in the Boscov's court due to being distracted because she was walking and text messaging at the same time. Days later the video uploaded to YouTube with titles such as "Girl Falls In Mall Fountain While Texting" went viral and received international news coverage. As a result of this incident, the security guard who posted the video was fired.

On May 22, 2014, the mall was hit by an unusually severe spring thunderstorm. Golf ball-sized hail ripped through the ceiling causing interior damage by shattering skylights which left glass and debris covering walkways, plants and the fountain in the Sears court, while cars were dented and windshields smashed in the parking lot.

The Bon-Ton store, originally a Lit Brothers until 1976 and later a Pomeroy's until 1987, at Berkshire Mall shuttered on August 28, 2018, after it wasn't able to establish any new conditions to satisfy its established long-term debt. On November 8, 2018, Sears announced it would shutter as part of an ongoing decision to phase out of their traditional brick-and-mortar format.

In July 2020, Allied Properties sold Berkshire Mall to Namdar Realty Group.

In November 2022, the former Bon-Ton space at the mall was condemned by the township fire marshal due to a partially collapsing roof as well as other issues with the structure.

In October 2025, it was announced that the mall was slated for closure, demolition, and redevelopment.

== Berkshire Mall West ==
Berkshire Mall West is a strip plaza across Woodland Road from Berkshire Mall that contains a Fine Wine & Good Spirits Premium Collection store, One Stop Beverage, TJ Maxx, Outback Steakhouse, and Customers Bank. There was a Circuit City until 2009, which closed after the chain folded and reopened as an H. H. Gregg in 2010. H. H. Gregg closed in 2017 as part of the chain's "turnaround efforts"; the space became a Burlington in 2021. There was also an A.C. Moore until that chain went out of business in 2020 (that space is now a DSW), and an Old Country Buffet that closed in 2016 (That space became a Boot Barn).

== In popular culture ==
The mall is featured in the 2021 Julian Katz novel, Don't Call Me Ishmael, in which the main character, Kieran, purchases a CD by the fictional band, Stay Sweet, at the FYE store. Taking place in 2006, many of the mall's long-since closed stores are mentioned including the former Sears and The Bon-Ton.
