= Westgate Mall (Texas) =

- Location: 7701 I-40, Amarillo, Texas, United States
- Coordinates: 35.18398°N 101.92805°W
- Opened: October 1982
- Developer: Homart Development Company
- Manager: Mason Asset Management, Namdar Realty Group and CH Capital Group
- Owner: Mason Asset Management, Namdar Realty Group and CH Capital Group
- Num. of stores: 100
- Num. of anchor tenants: 5 (4 open, 1 vacant)
- Floor area: 878,000 square feet
- Floors: 1 (2 in JCPenney)
- Website: westgatemalltx.com

Westgate Mall is an indoor shopping mall located in Amarillo, Texas, United States. It has over 100 mainline stores and 3 anchor stores, two Dillard's locations, with the men's store originally a Mervyn's and the women’s store originally a Sears, JCPenney, with 1 vacant anchor last occupied by the former Dillard’s.

The mall opened in October 1982 and cost $40 million to construct. It is located along Interstate 40.

On December 28, 2018, it was announced that Sears would be closing as part of a plan to close 80 stores nationwide. The store closed in March 2019.

The mall is partially in Potter County, Texas and partially in Randall County, Texas. The county line goes through the JCPenney store.
