= South Park Mall (Texas) =

Shopping mall in San Antonio, Texas, U.S.

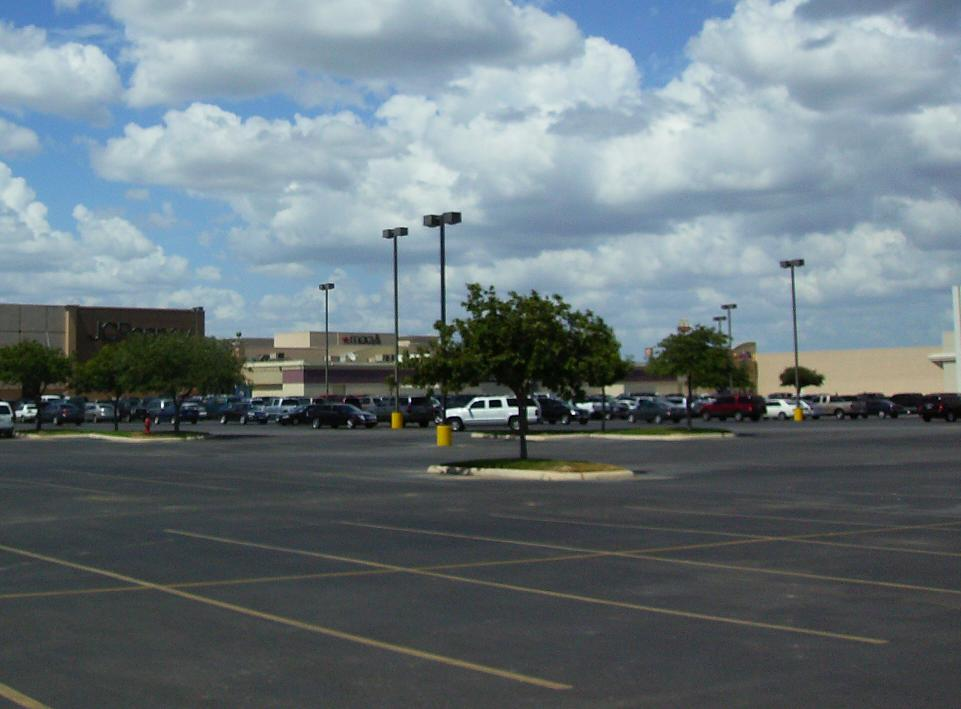
- South Park Mall's East wing
- Location: San Antonio, Texas, U.S.
- Coordinates: 29.35483°N 98.5307°W
- Opened: 1974
- Developer: Roy L. Martin & Associates
- Manager: Mason Asset Management
- Owner: Namdar Realty Group
- Num. of stores: 85
- Num. of anchor tenants: 5
- Floor area: 790,000 sq ft (73,000 m^{2})
- Floors: 1 (2 in JCPenney and Macy's)
- Website: visitsouthpark.com

South Park Mall is a shopping mall located on the southwest side of San Antonio, Texas. It serves the communities on the south side of the city, with a Hispanic theme inside it. It is anchored by Dick's Sporting Goods, JCPenney, Macy's, Fitness Connection, and Floor & Decor.

== History ==
The mall opened in 1974. Roy L. Martin & Associates built the mall, which opened for business in 1974. Among the first tenants were J. C. Penney, TG&Y, Woolco, and H-E-B.

Woolco later became Mervyns, which closed in 2008. It became Dick's Sporting Goods in 2014. JCPenney is the other original anchor. Phar-Mor was added in 1991 as a third anchor, but it closed in 1992. In 1996, Sears moved from a store on Military Drive to the former Phar-Mor. Foley's (now Macy's) was added as a fourth anchor in 2000. On November 7, 2019, it was announced that Sears would be closing this location a part of a plan to close 96 stores nationwide. The store permanently closed on February 16, 2020. In February 2020 A group of three New York-based investors teamed up to buy South Park Mall, JLL Capital Markets confirmed.

New York firms Mason Asset Management, Namdar Realty Group and CH Capital Group purchased the San Antonio mall as well as Westgate Mall in Amarillo.

On July 1st, 2022, Houston-based gym chain Fitness Connection announced that they be opening San Antonio's first location at South Park Mall, replacing most of the former Sears. Fitness Connection opened on October 15th of the same year.

On May 22, 2025, Floor & Decor, a retailer chain focused on hard surface flooring, would open at South Park Mall. Floor & Decor replaced the remaining of the former Sears.
