= Yuba County Five =

1978 deaths and disappearance in California

- Gary Mathias, the only one of the five never found
- Date: February 24, 1978
- Location: Plumas National Forest, California, U.S.
- Type: Missing persons investigation
- Cause: Unknown
- Deaths: 4 (Bill Sterling, Jack Huett, Ted Weiher, and Jack Madruga)
- Missing: 1 (Gary Mathias)

The Yuba County Five were young men from Yuba County, California, United States, each with mild intellectual disabilities or psychiatric conditions, who were reported missing after attending a college basketball game at California State University, Chico (also known as Chico State), on the night of February 24, 1978. Four of them—Bill Sterling, 29; Jack Huett, 24; Ted Weiher, 32; and Jack Madruga, 30—were later found dead; the fifth, Gary Mathias, 25, has never been found.

Several days after their disappearance, Madruga's car, a 1969 Mercury Montego which the group drove to Chico, was found abandoned in a remote area of Plumas National Forest, on a high mountain dirt road far out of their way back to Yuba County. Investigators could not determine why the car was abandoned, as it was in good working order and could easily have been pushed out of the snowpack it was in. At that time, no trace of the men was found.

In June 1978, four of the men's bodies were discovered after the snow had melted. Ted Weiher was found inside a United States Forest Service (USFS) trailer some 20 miles north of the abandoned car. Only bones were left of Jack Madruga, Bill Sterling, and Jackie Huett as a result of scavenging animals; Weiher had apparently lived for as long as three months after the men were last seen, starving to death despite an ample supply of food and heating materials in and near the trailer. Weiher was missing his shoes; investigators found Mathias' own shoes in the USFS trailer, suggesting he survived for some time after the group's last sighting.

A local man later came forward, claiming that he had spent the same night in his own car a short distance from where the Mercury was found. The witness told police that he saw and heard people around his car that night, and twice called for help, only for them to grow silent and turn off their flashlights. This, and the considerable distance from the car to where the bodies were found, has led to suspicions of foul play.

== Background ==
While he was stationed in West Germany as part of his United States Army service in the early 1970s, Gary Mathias, a resident of Marysville, California, developed substance issues. This eventually led to him being diagnosed with schizophrenia and given a psychiatric discharge. Mathias returned to his parents' home in Marysville and began treatment at a local mental hospital. While it had been difficult at first—he was nearly arrested for assault twice and often experienced psychotic episodes that landed him in a local Veterans Administration hospital—by 1978 he was being treated on an outpatient basis with trifluoperazine and benzatropine and was considered by his physicians to be "one of our sterling success cases".

Mathias supplemented his Army disability pay by working in his stepfather's gardening business. Off the job, outside of his family, he was close friends with four men who either had intellectual disabilities (Weiher and Huett) or were informally considered "slow learners" (Sterling and Madruga, the latter also an Army veteran). The men lived in Yuba City and nearby Marysville. Like Mathias, each man lived with his parents, all of whom referred to them collectively as "the boys".

The men's favorite leisure activity was sports. Their families said that when the five got together, it was usually to play or watch a game. They played basketball on a team called the Gateway Gators, a team supported by a local program for people with disabilities.

== Disappearance ==
On February 25, the Gators were due to play their first game in a weeklong tournament sponsored by the Special Olympics for which the winners would get a free week in Los Angeles. The five men had prepared the night before, some even laying out their uniforms and asking their parents to wake them up on time. They decided to drive to Chico that same night to cheer on the UC Davis basketball team in an away game against Chico State. Madruga, the only member of the group besides Mathias with a driver's license, drove the group 50 miles (80 km) north to the Chico State campus in his turquoise and white 1969 Mercury Montego coupe. The men wore only light coats against the cool temperatures in the upper Sacramento Valley at night that time of year.

After the Davis team won the game, the group returned to Madruga's car and drove a short distance from Chico State to Behr's Market in downtown Chico, where they bought snacks, sodas, and cartons of milk. It was shortly before the store's 10 p.m. closing time; the clerk later remembered the men because she was annoyed that such a large group had entered and delayed her closing the store for the night.

When morning came, and the men had not returned, their families notified the police.

== Investigation ==
Police in Butte and Yuba counties began searching the route the men took to Chico. They found no sign of them, but a few days later, a Plumas National Forest ranger told investigators that he had seen the Mercury parked in the forest along Oroville-Quincy Road on February 25. At the time, he did not consider it significant, since many residents often drove up that road into the Sierra Nevada mountain range on winter weekends to go cross-country skiing on the extensive trail system, but after reading the missing persons bulletin he recognized the car and led the deputies to it on February 28.

=== Discovery of the car ===
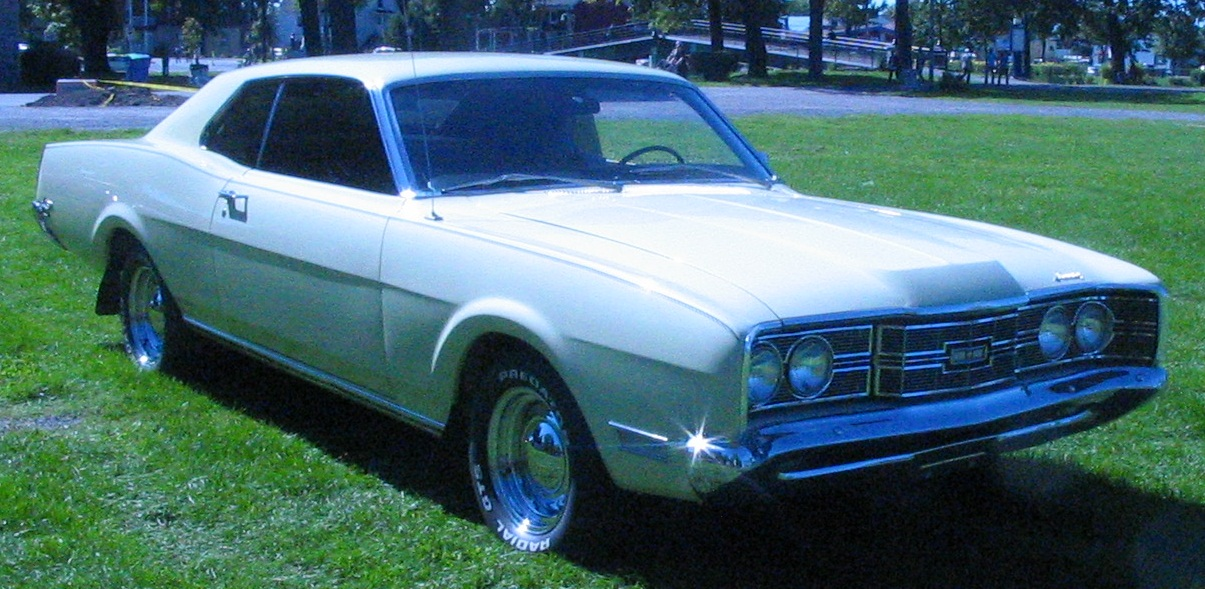
1969 Mercury Montego coupe similar to the one owned by Madruga

Evidence inside the car suggested the men were in it between the time they were last seen and when it was abandoned. Empty wrappers and containers from the food and drinks they purchased from the store in Chico were present, along with programs from the basketball game they attended and a neatly folded road map of California.

The car's location, 70 miles (110 km) from Chico, was far from any direct route to Yuba City or Marysville. None of the men's families could speculate as to why they would drive up a long and winding dirt road (Note: It has since been paved.) on a winter night deep into a high-elevation remote forest, without extra clothing. Madruga's parents said he did not like cold weather and had never even been up into the mountains. Sterling's father had once taken his son to the area near where the car was found for a fishing weekend, but the younger man had not enjoyed it and remained at home when his father took later trips there.

Police were puzzled by the car's abandonment. The road was at 4,400 feet (1,300 m) in elevation, about the location of the snow line that time of year, a short distance from where the road was closed for the winter. The car had become stuck in snow drifts, and there was evidence that the men tried to spin the wheels to get out of it; police noted that the snow was not very deep and that five healthy young men should have easily been able to push the car out. The car keys were not present, suggesting at first that the car had been abandoned because it might not have been operating properly, with the intention of returning later with help; when police hot-wired the car, the engine started immediately and the fuel gauge indicated the tank was one-quarter full of gasoline.

Police towed the car back to the station for a more thorough examination. The Mercury's undercarriage had no dents, gouges or even mud scrapes, not even on its low-hanging muffler, despite having been driven a long distance up a mountain road with many bumps, ruts and potholes. Either the driver had been extremely careful or it was someone familiar with the road, a familiarity Madruga was not known to have; his family said that Madruga would not have let someone else drive the car. The car was unlocked and had a window rolled down when it was found; Madruga's family indicated it was unlike him to leave the car so unsecured.

Efforts to search the vicinity were hampered by a severe snowstorm that day. Two days later, after searchers in snowcats nearly became lost themselves, further search efforts were called off due to continuing bad weather. Other than the car, no trace of the men was found.

=== Sightings ===
In response to local media coverage of the case, police received several reports of some or all of the men being sighted after they had left Chico, including some reports that they were elsewhere in California or the country. Most reports were easily dismissed, but two sightings stood out. Joseph Schons of Sacramento told police he inadvertently wound up spending the night of February 24–25 near where the Montego was found. He had driven up there, where he had a cabin, to check the snowpack before a weekend ski trip with his family. At 5:30 p.m., about 150 feet (46 m) up the road, Schons, too, had gotten stuck in the snow. While trying to free his car, he realized he was beginning to experience the early symptoms of a heart attack and went back in, keeping the engine running to provide heat.

Six hours later, lying in the car and experiencing severe pain, Schons saw headlights behind him. He saw a car parked behind him, headlights on, with a group of people around it, one of whom seemed to him to be a woman holding a baby. He called to the party for help, but they stopped talking and switched their headlights off. Later, he saw more lights behind him, this time flashlights, that also went out when he called to them.

After that, Schons said he first recalled a pickup truck briefly parking 20 feet (6 m) behind him, then continuing down the road. Later, he clarified to the police that he could not be sure of that, since at the time he was almost delirious from pain. After Schons' car ran out of fuel in the early morning hours, his pain subsided enough for him to walk 8 miles (13 km) down the road to a lodge, where the manager drove him home, passing the abandoned Montego at the place from where he had recalled hearing the voices. Doctors later confirmed that he had, indeed, experienced a mild heart attack.

Weiher's mother said ignoring someone's pleas for help was not like her son, if indeed he had been present. She recalled how he and Sterling had helped someone they knew get to the hospital after overdosing on Valium.

The other notable report was from a woman who worked at a store in the small town of Brownsville, 30 miles (48 km) from where the car had been abandoned, which the men would have reached had they continued down the road. On March 3, the woman, who saw fliers with the men's pictures and information about a $1,215 ($6,000 in 2025) reward the families offered, told deputies that four of them stopped at the store in a red pickup truck the day after the disappearance. The store owner corroborated her account.

The woman said she immediately realized that the men were not from the area because of their "big eyes and facial expressions". Two of the men, whom she identified as Huett and Sterling, were in a telephone booth outside, while the other two went inside. The police said she was "a credible witness," and they took her account seriously.

Additional details came from the store owner, who told investigators that men whom he believed to be Weiher and Huett came in and bought burritos, chocolate milk, and soft drinks. Weiher's brother told the Los Angeles Times that while driving to Brownsville in a different car in apparent ignorance of the basketball game seemed completely out of character for them, the owner's description of the two men's behavior seemed consistent with them, as Weiher would "eat anything he could get his hands on" and was often accompanied by Huett more than any of the other three. Huett's brother said Jack hated using telephones to the point that he would answer calls for Jack whenever he received any from the other men in the group.

== Discovery of bodies ==
With the evidence not pointing to any clear conclusion about what happened the night the five men disappeared, police and the families were not ruling out the possibility that they had met with foul play. The eventual discovery of four of the five men's bodies seemed to suggest otherwise, but raised more questions about what happened that night, and whether at least one of them might have been rescued.

On June 4, with most of the higher-elevation snow melted, a group of motorcyclists went to a trailer maintained by the USFS at a campsite off the road about 19.4 miles (31.2 km) from where the Mercury had been found. The front window of the trailer was broken. When they opened the door, they were overcome by the stench of a decomposing body inside. It was later identified as Weiher's.

Searchers returned to Plumas, following the road between the trailer and where the Mercury was abandoned. The following day, remains later identified as those of Madruga and Sterling, were discovered on opposite sides of the road 11.4 miles (18.3 km) from where the car had been. Madruga's body had been partially consumed by scavenging animals; only bones remained of Sterling, scattered over a small area.

Two days later, as part of one of the other search parties, Huett's father found his son's backbone under a manzanita bush 2 miles (3.2 km) northeast of the trailer. His shoes and jeans, found nearby, helped identify the body. The next day, a skull was discovered by a deputy sheriff 300 feet (91 m) away from the bush, confirmed by dental records later to be Huett's. His death was also attributed to hypothermia.

Around a quarter-mile (400 m) northwest of the trailer, searchers found three Forest Service blankets and a rusted flashlight next to the road. It could not be determined how long those items had been there. Since Mathias had presumably not taken his medication, his photograph was distributed to mental institutions all over California. However, no trace of Mathias has ever been found.

=== Evidence in trailer ===
Weiher's body, wrapped in eight sheets including the head, was found on a bed, inside the trailer. An autopsy showed that he died of a combination of starvation and hypothermia. Weiher had lost nearly half his 200 pounds (91 kg); the growth of his beard suggested he had lived slightly more than three months since he last shaved. His feet were badly frostbitten, almost gangrenous. On a table next to the bed were some of Weiher's personal effects, including his wallet (with cash), a nickel ring with "Ted" engraved on it and a gold necklace he also wore. Also on the table were a gold watch, missing its crystal, which Weiher's family said was not his, and a partially melted candle. He was wearing a velour shirt and lightweight pants, but his shoes could not be found.

Most puzzling to the investigators was how Weiher had come to his fate. The trailer's fireplace had not been used despite an ample supply of matches and paperback novels for kindling. Heavy forestry clothing, which could have kept the men warm, also remained where it had been stored. Three dozen C-ration cans from a storage shed outside had been opened and their contents consumed, but a locker in the same shed that held an even greater assortment of dehydrated foods, enough to keep all five men fed for a year if necessary, had not even been opened. Similarly, another shed nearby held a butane tank with a valve that, had it been opened, would have fed the trailer's heating system.

Weiher's family said that he lacked common sense as a result of his cognitive disability. For example, he often asked why it was necessary to stop at a stop sign, and one night had to be dragged out of bed while the ceiling of his bedroom was burning in a house fire, because he was afraid he would be late for work if he did not get enough sleep.

It also appeared that Weiher had not been alone in the trailer and that Mathias had been there as well. Mathias's tennis sneakers were in the trailer, and the C-rations had been opened with a P-38 can opener, with which only Mathias or Madruga were familiar from their military service. Mathias, his feet perhaps also swollen from frostbite, could have decided to put Weiher's shoes on instead if he had ventured outside. The sheets covering Weiher's body also suggested that one of the others had been there with him, as his gangrenous feet would have caused too much pain for him to pull them over his body himself.

== Theory ==
After it was determined that four of the five men had died in the Sierras, investigators still had no explanation as to why the men were there. However, they learned that Mathias had friends in the small town of Forbestown; police believed it was possible that, in an attempt to visit their friends on the way back home, the men may have taken a wrong turn near Oroville that put them on the mountain road. For whatever reason, the men had left the Mercury; instead of going back the way they came (where they had passed the lodge that Schons later returned to), they chose to continue along the road in the direction they were originally headed.

The day before the men went missing, a USFS snowcat went along the road in that direction to clear snow off the trailer roof so it would not collapse. It was possible, police believed, that the group had decided to follow the tracks it had left through snowdrifts 4–6 feet (1.2–1.8 m) high to wherever they led, in the belief that shelter was not far away. Most likely, Madruga and Sterling died of hypothermia about halfway through the long walk to the trailer, and Huett soon after.

It is assumed that once they found the trailer, the other two broke the window to enter. Since it was locked, they may have feared arrest for burglary or theft if they used anything they found there. After Weiher died, or after Mathias thought he had died, he may have decided to try to return to civilization in various ways, such as walking overland.

== See also ==
- Dyatlov Pass incident — 1959 incident in Russia in which nine hikers died under mysterious circumstances; the case of the Yuba County Five is often referred to as the "American Dyatlov Pass"
- Fort Worth missing trio — Unsolved 1974 disappearance of three girls in Texas
- Phillips family disappearances — 2021 disappearances in New Zealand
- List of people who disappeared mysteriously (1910–1970)
- List of solved missing person cases (1970s)
