= The Citadel (mall) =

Shopping mall in Colorado Springs, Colorado, United States

The Citadel Mall
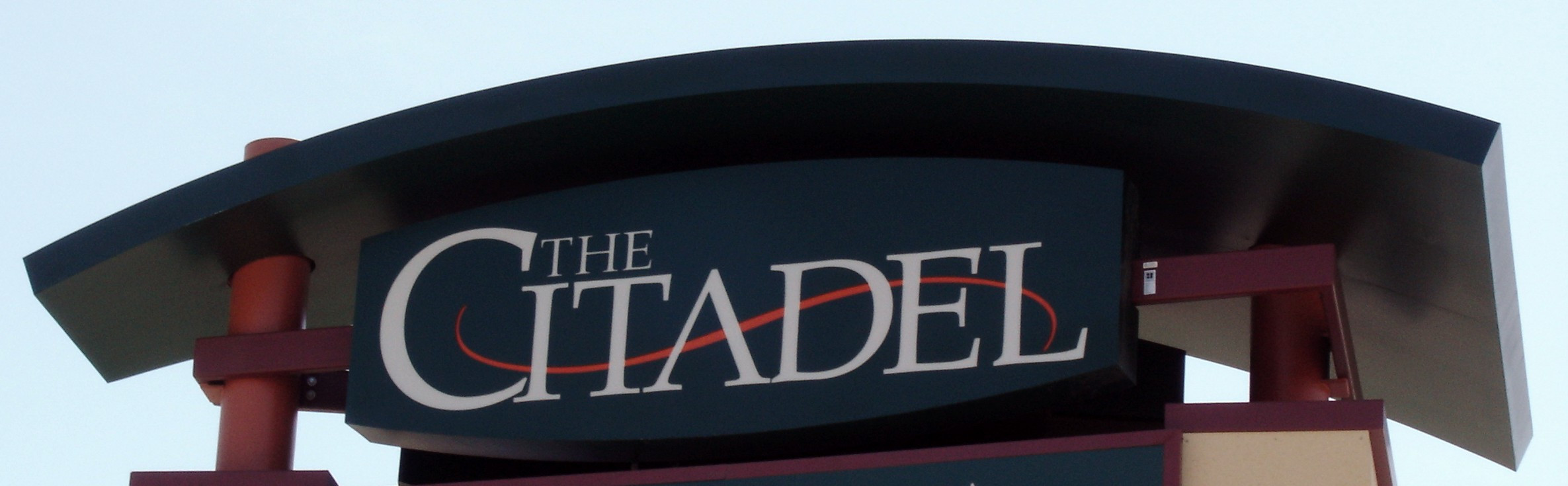
- The Citadel logo entrance, 2008
- Location: Colorado Springs, Colorado, U.S.
- Coordinates: 38.843°N 104.76°W
- Opened: 1972; 54 years ago
- Renovated: 1984
- Developer: General Growth Properties, Associated Dry Goods, and JCP Realty, Inc. (original); The Rouse Co. (1980s renovation/expansion)
- Manager: Mason Asset Management
- Owner: Namdar Realty Group
- Num. of anchor tenants: 3 (2 open, 1 vacant)
- Floor area: 1,095,053 sq ft (101,733.8 m^{2})
- Floors: 3 (2 in JCPenney's, Former Burlington, and former Macy's)
- Website: http://www.shopthecitadel.com

The Citadel is a shopping mall in Colorado Springs, Colorado, United States. Opened in 1972, it features JCPenney, and Dillard's, as its anchor stores. The mall is owned by Namdar Realty Group and managed by Mason Asset Management.

== History ==
Construction on the Citadel Mall began in 1970, and it opened on March 1, 1972, anchored by a JCPenney and Denver Dry Goods store, and included a two screen movie theater. The original mall consisted of 2 levels and 594,800 square feet of leasable space.

By 1980, The Rouse Company owned the mall. In 1984, the mall was expanded westward with a two level extension which included a third anchor store, May-Daniels & Fisher aka May D&F, and the creation of a two level food court. The mall's last expansion occurred in 1995 with the opening of a three level Dillard's at the end of the western extension.

In 1997, it was sold to The Macerich Company, a company based in California. In January 2007, the mall was sold to Midwest Mall Properties, a private investor group, which retained Macerich as management company.

Although many stores surround the actual mall, the entire campus is located at the intersection of Platte and Academy. When the mall originally opened it was on the eastern edge of the city.

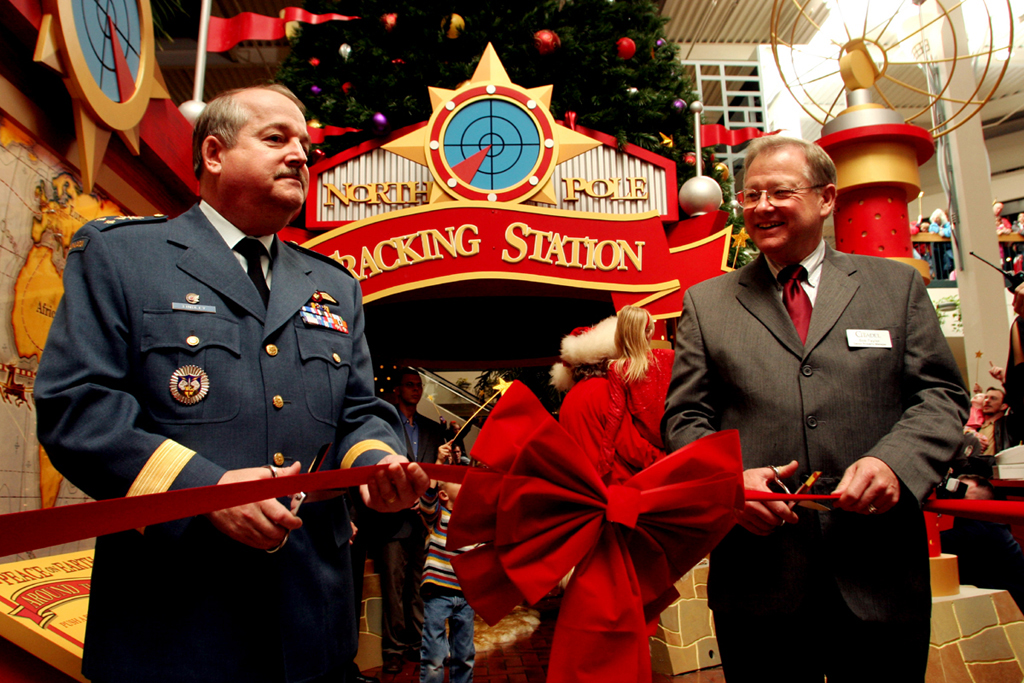
Lt.-Gen. Rick Findley, deputy commander of the North American Aerospace Defense Command, and Robert Taylor, former senior property manager at Citadel Mall, perform the ceremonial ribbon cutting during the Nov. 18, 2005 launch of the Citadel Mall's Santa Tracking Station.

From November 18 thru December 25, 2005, for the 50th anniversary of the NORAD Tracks Santa program, the Citadel Mall had a massive Santa Tracking Village that included a 25-foot tree, a tracking map and viewfinder where visitors could watch a NORAD Tracks Santa video, hear audio messages of peace from children around the world, and receive a 24-page coloring book with Santa's assistants wearing NORAD patches.

In February 2006, Mervyn's closed 10 out of its 11 stores in Colorado, including the one at the Citadel, which was 99,751 sq ft (9,267.2 m^{2}). on two levels. In September, 2006, the Foley's store at the mall was rebranded Macy's, in accordance with a national renaming. Steve & Barry's closed their store in 2008 after bankruptcy, and Macy's closed their store at the Citadel in March 2009 due to poor sales.

In 2015, Dillard's was downgraded to a clearance center closing the third floor.

In 2020, JCPenney was put up for sale but remains open.

In 2024, Burlington Closed its store, to move to a strip mall across the street from the mall. Minus a few month stay from Spirit Halloween in 2025, the anchor has not been replaced.

== Shooting incidents ==
Since January 2016, at least 23 people have been shot in the immediate vicinity of The Citadel. Four people have died from gunshot wounds at the mall since March 2022. These incidents have led to locals referring to the mall as The Shootadel.

Date	Casualties	Description
July 27, 2025	2 injured	Several fights were happening when gunshots started occurring.
December 24, 2023	1 killed, 2 injured	A fight broke out between two groups of people near JCPenney resulting in numerous shots fired that killed one adult male and injured two adult males. A female was also injured, but not due to being shot.
March 25, 2022	2 killed, 2 injured	A fight in the parking lot outside Dillard’s and Burlington Coat Factory ended with the deaths of two people and two wounded.
June 18, 2021	3 injured	Three people were reportedly shot at a carnival in the parking lot by several young men allegedly shooting at the crowd.
April 22, 2021	1 injured	A person received a gunshot wound. Two people were detained after the incident.
February 27, 2021	0 injured	Shots were fired in the parking lot after an incident in the food court.
January 2, 2020	1 injured	A man was allegedly shot in the torso outside of Hooters Restaurant.
September 12, 2019	1 injured	A teenager was wounded by gunfire in the parking lot.
July 14, 2019	1 injured	Shots fired outside Burlington Coat Factory. One person was wounded.
December 18, 2018	At least 3 injured	At least three people were wounded in a drive-by shooting in the parking lot. One person was arrested.
December 8, 2018	0 injured	Shots were fired during an altercation in the parking lot.
November 28, 2017	0 injured	Shots were fired in the parking lot.
January 2, 2016	3 injured	Three people were injured by gunfire in the parking lot.
