= Kokomo Town Center =

- Kokomo Town Center
- Location: Kokomo, Indiana
- Coordinates: 40.463798°N 86.110305°W
- Address: 1700 East Boulevard
- Opened: 1963; 2014 renovated
- Developer: Edward J. DeBartolo, Sr.
- Owner: Veritas Realty
- Num. of anchor tenants: 7 (6 open, 1 vacant by around October 2020)
- Floor area: 310,430 square feet (28,840 m^{2}) (original mall)
- Floors: 1
- Public transit: Kokomo City-Line Trolley

Kokomo Town Center, formerly Kokomo Mall, is an outdoor shopping mall in Kokomo, Indiana. Opened in 1963, the property was converted from an enclosed mall to an outdoor plaza in 2014. The plaza's stores are Gabe's, AMC Theatres, Robert Miller & Son Furniture, Momentum Clothing & Accessories, Classy Nails, CosmoProf, and T-Mobile.

== History ==
Edward J. DeBartolo Corporation built Kokomo Mall in 1963. Anchor tenants included Montgomery Ward, H. P. Wasson and Company, and J. C. Penney. By the end of the decade, the mall was purchased by Novil-Novick Associates, who enclosed the formerly open-air mall.

Several stores at the mall closed throughout the 1980s, starting with National Food and Wasson's in 1980, followed by Montgomery Ward in 1981, G. C. Murphy, and several other original stores, leaving only J. C. Penney as an anchor. Meis replaced the former Montgomery Ward in 1987. After Meis opened, Kokomo Mall Associates bought the mall in 1986 from West-Penn Realty and added several new stores, including Phar-Mor in the former Wasson's. Also, the mall interior was largely rebuilt, and new marble flooring was installed. Meis was bought out by Elder-Beerman in 1989.

In 1992, Manulife Real Estate acquired the mall. A year later, mall occupancy declined to 60 percent as tenants moved to other retail developments in Kokomo. Goody's Family Clothing opened an anchor store at the mall in 1998, taking over several small spaces in the J. C. Penney wing.

By 2010, the mall was almost again empty after Goody's closed. Elder-Beerman's parent company, The Bon-Ton, closed the Kokomo Mall store in 2011 and replaced it with a Carson's at nearby Markland Mall. The space became Robert Miller & Son Furniture one year later, coinciding with mall renovations and a rename to Kokomo Town Center.

In 2014, part of the mall structure was demolished, leaving only the storefronts on the east side, plus the J. C. Penney and Robert Miller stores, and the long-abandoned Phar-Mor. The property is now owned by Veritas Realty.

On June 4, 2020, it was announced that JCPenney will be closing around October 2020 as part of a plan to close 154 stores nationwide. After JCPenney closes, Robert Miller & Son Furniture will be the only traditional anchor store left.

In August 2021, a Gabe's department store opened in the former JCPenney location.

== See also ==
- List of shopping malls in the United States
