= University Mall (Illinois) =

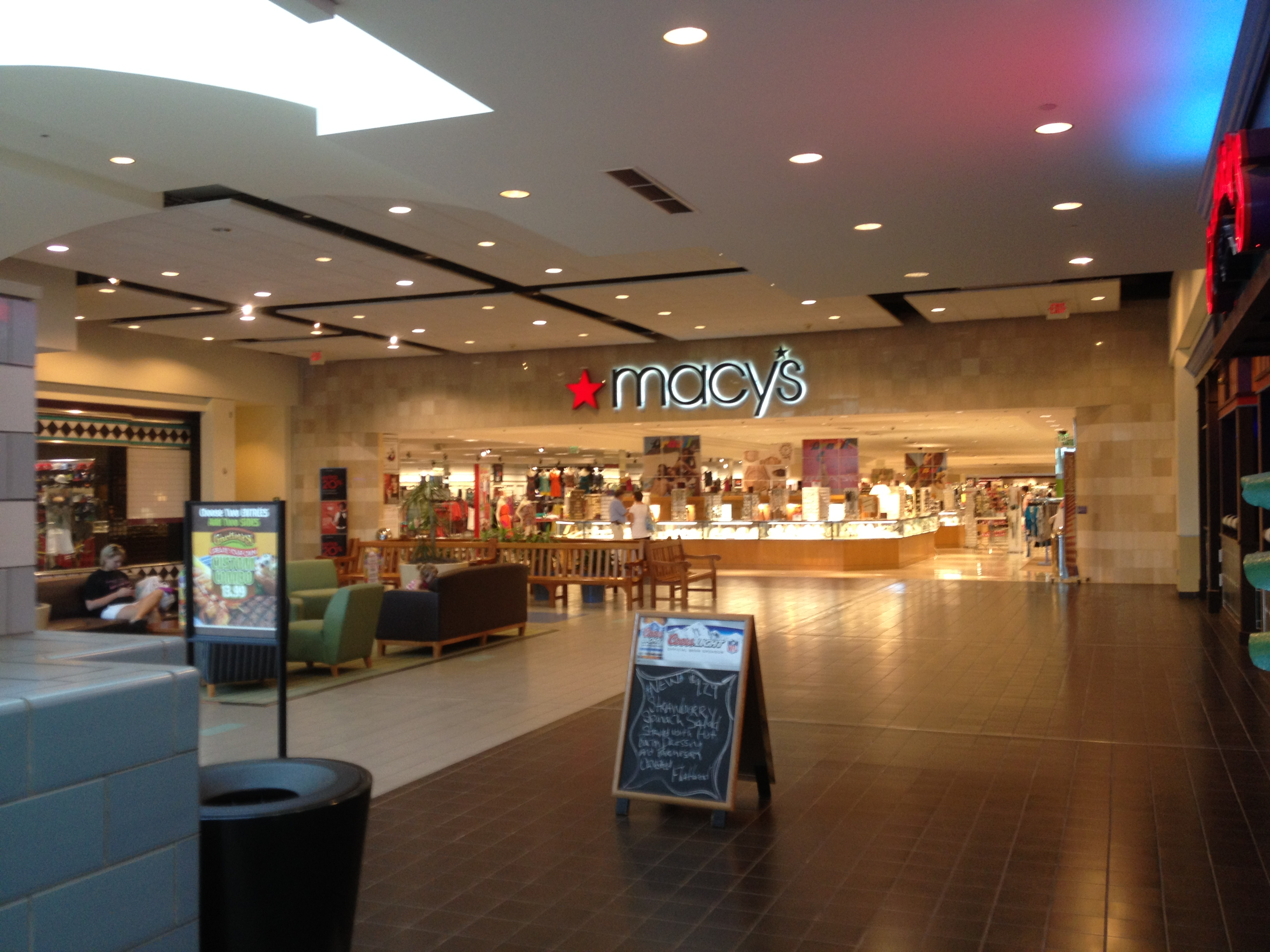
- Macy's mall entrance at University Mall, May 2012
- Location: Carbondale, Illinois, United States
- Coordinates: 37.7295°N 89.1918°W
- Opened: 1974
- Developer: David Hocker and Alan Squitieri
- Manager: Namdar Realty Group
- Num. of stores: approx. 15
- Num. of anchor tenants: 5
- Floor area: 709,058 square feet (65,874 m^{2})
- Floors: 1
- Public transit: Saluki Express
- Website: www.shopatuniversitymall.com

University Mall is a shopping mall in Carbondale, Illinois, United States. Opened in 1974, it originally featured JCPenney and Sears as its major anchor stores, the latter taking the place of a Britt's discount store which never opened for business. The mall received multiple expansions in the 1980s and 1990s, adding Meis (sold to Elder-Beerman in 1989), Venture Stores, and Famous-Barr. Sears moved to the then Illinois Centre Mall and was replaced by Montgomery Ward. Venture, Elder-Beerman, and Montgomery Ward all closed throughout the 1990s, with the former becoming K's Merchandise Mart until 2007, while Famous-Barr became Macy's in 2006. The mall has seen several closures in stores throughout the 21st century, including both Macy's and JCPenney. The remaining mall tenants include Ross Dress for Less, Hot Topic, Illinicare Health, and SIH Medical Group. University Mall is managed by Namdar Realty Group.

== History ==
The first store to open at University Mall was a JCPenney department store, which opened in 1971. The same year, real estate developers David E. Hocker and Alan Squitieri, both of Owensboro, Kentucky, announced plans to build a mall extending easterly from the JCPenney store. Under their plans, the other original anchor stores would be Britt's (a discount department store owned by J. J. Newberry) and a Walgreens pharmacy. After construction of the Britt's store was completed, the company defaulted on its lease, and the store was never completed. As a result, the space was instead converted to Sears. The mall was slated to open in October 1974. In addition to JCPenney, Sears, and Walgreens, it also featured 20 other stores including Kirlin's Hallmark, Zales Jewelers, Baskin-Robbins, Waldenbooks, Regis Hairstylists, Karmelkorn, and General Nutrition Center, with a four-screen American Multi-Cinema theater planned for opening by December. Opening ceremonies occurred on October 30, 1974, accompanied by the Carbondale Community High School band and then-Miss Illinois Jean Ahern, along with performers dressed as Winnie the Pooh and Big Bird.

The first expansion to the mall occurred in 1980, when a new wing was added consisting of more than ten new storefronts and another anchor store: Terre Haute, Indiana-based Meis. Among the stores present in the new wing were Lerner New York, Spencer Gifts, Pearle Vision, Pier 1 Imports, Kinney Shoes, and Claire's. In August 1989, Elder-Beerman completed acquisition and renaming of all stores in the Meis chain, including the location at University Mall. A year later, Sears relocated to the Illinois Centre Mall in nearby Marion, and their location at University Mall was sold to Montgomery Ward.

A second expansion in 1991 added a new wing and two more anchor stores both owned by The May Department Stores Company: Famous-Barr and Venture Stores. Venture opened for business in March 1991, with many stores in their wing, including Victoria's Secret, Limited Express, and a relocation of Lerner New York, following in May. This new expansion cost over $43 million, and consisted of over 290,000 square feet (27,000 m^{2}) of retail space. Both Montgomery Ward and Famous-Barr opened for business on November 1, 1991. Other stores joining the mall at this point included Hibbett Sports, Maurices, and Belden Jewelers. In addition, a food court opened near JCPenney. Applebee's opened in the mall's parking lot on April 4, 1995.

Venture closed its store at University Mall in 1993, and later became K's Merchandise Mart. Elder-Beerman closed in 1997 and became health offices. An Old Navy was added in May 2002, and later that year, the Montgomery Ward space was demolished for a movie theater owned by Kerasotes (later AMC Theatres) and other small stores, including Bed Bath & Beyond, Goody's Family Clothing, Steve & Barry's, and Michaels. The food court was relocated in 2004 to the former Elder-Beerman wing. A Panera Bread opened in the surrounding area on May 17 of the same year. In 2005, Stoltz Management acquired the mall, and one year later, Famous-Barr was one of several nameplates to be converted to Macy's.

K's Merchandise closed in early 2007, as did Michaels. These closures were followed in 2008 by Goody's and Steve & Barry's. In October 2012, Ross Dress for Less opened in the space vacated by Michaels, and the former Steve & Barry's became Shoe Dept. Encore. On April 27, 2018, it was announced that AMC Theatres will be closing on May 10, 2018.

On January 6, 2020, it was announced that Macy's would close in March 2020 as part of a plan to close 125 stores nationwide. Due to the COVID-19 pandemic, the store closed abruptly on March 17, 2020, along with all Macy's locations nationwide. The store never reopened to the public.

On June 4, 2020, JCPenney announced that it would close by around October 2020 as part of a plan to close 154 stores nationwide. This will leave the mall with no traditional anchor stores.

On September 15, 2022, it was announced that Bed Bath & Beyond would be closing as part of a plan to close 150 stores nationwide.
