= Markland Mall =

- Markland Mall
- Location: Kokomo, Indiana, U.S.
- Coordinates: 40.474°N 86.110°W
- Address: 1114 17th Street
- Opened: 1968
- Developer: Melvin Simon & Associates
- Manager: JLL
- Num. of stores: 40+
- Num. of anchor tenants: 9 ( All Open )
- Floor area: 394,038 sq ft (36,607 m^{2})
- Floors: 1
- Public transit: Kokomo City-Line Trolley

Markland Mall is an enclosed shopping mall in Kokomo, Indiana, United States. Opened in 1968, the mall features Target and Dunham's Sports as its anchor stores. Other major tenants of the mall include Books-A-Million, PetSmart, Five Below, Ross Dress for Less, Aldi, and Gravity Trampoline Park. Melvin Simon & Associates, now known as Simon Property Group, built the mall in 1967, with original anchor stores including Ayr-Way, Sears, and Danners. The mall has undergone a large number of tenancy changes in its history: Danners became William H. Block Co., Lazarus, Macy's, and Carson's before becoming Dunham's Sports in 2020, while Ayr-Way was sold to Target in 1981 and Sears was demolished in 2017 for a row of big-box stores. The mall is managed by JLL.

== History ==
Melvin Simon & Associates announced the development of Markland Mall in 1967. Original tenants included Sears, Danners 5 & 10, a Kroger supermarket, SupeRx drugstore, and an Ayr-Way discount store.

The Danners store became William H. Block Co. in 1974. Ayr-Way was converted to Target along with the rest of the Ayr-Way chain in 1981. In 1985, the William H. Block store was expanded, taking over a mall hallway and space vacated by Robert Hall Village. This was part of a mall expansion that included the installation of new floor tiles and skylights, as well as the extension of certain storefronts to give the hallways a staggered appearance. Block later became Lazarus in 1987, and then Macy's before closing.

A Chili's restaurant opened outside the mall in 1999. In 2001, Old Navy was added to the mall, replacing space once occupied by a Goodyear service center. Lazarus became Macy's before closing in 2005. The movie theater, also an original tenant, closed in 2006. In 2011, the former Lazarus space became Carson's, resulting in the closure of an Elder-Beerman at the nearby Kokomo Mall (now Kokomo Town Center). Old Navy closed in 2016, with Sears and MC Sports both closing in 2017. Later in 2017, it was confirmed that the Sears store would be torn down for Aldi, Party City, PetSmart, and Ross Dress for Less. Gravity Trampoline Park replaced the MC Sports store the same year. Carson's closed in Summer 2018 along with the rest of the chain. In 2020, Dunham's Sports took over the space that was occupied by Carson's.
