= Meadows Shopping Center =

- Location: Terre Haute, Indiana, United States
- Coordinates: 39.464232380550754°N 87.37605839862005°W
- Opened: 1956
- Owner: Meadows Development of Terre Haute
- Num. of stores: 25+
- Num. of anchor tenants: 1
- Public transit: Terre Haute Transit
- Website: www.meadowsterrehaute.com

Meadows Shopping Center (often called "The Meadows") is an enclosed shopping center in Terre Haute, Indiana, United States. It opened in 1956 as an open-air shopping center and was enclosed in a 1982–1983 renovation.

== History ==
The shopping center opened in 1956, and according to the mall's site, 5,000 were in attendance. Original Anchor Stores included Woolworth's and a Kroger grocery store. The complex has undergone many different store changes throughout its existence. The first being the addition of a JC Penney Department store. Woolworth's closed in the 1970s and was replaced by a Meis department store, of which was converted into an Elder-Beerman in 1989. The former Penney's and Elder-Beerman spaces were converted into a Stein Mart that opened in 1995.

A movie theatre was added in 1970, and closed in 2014.

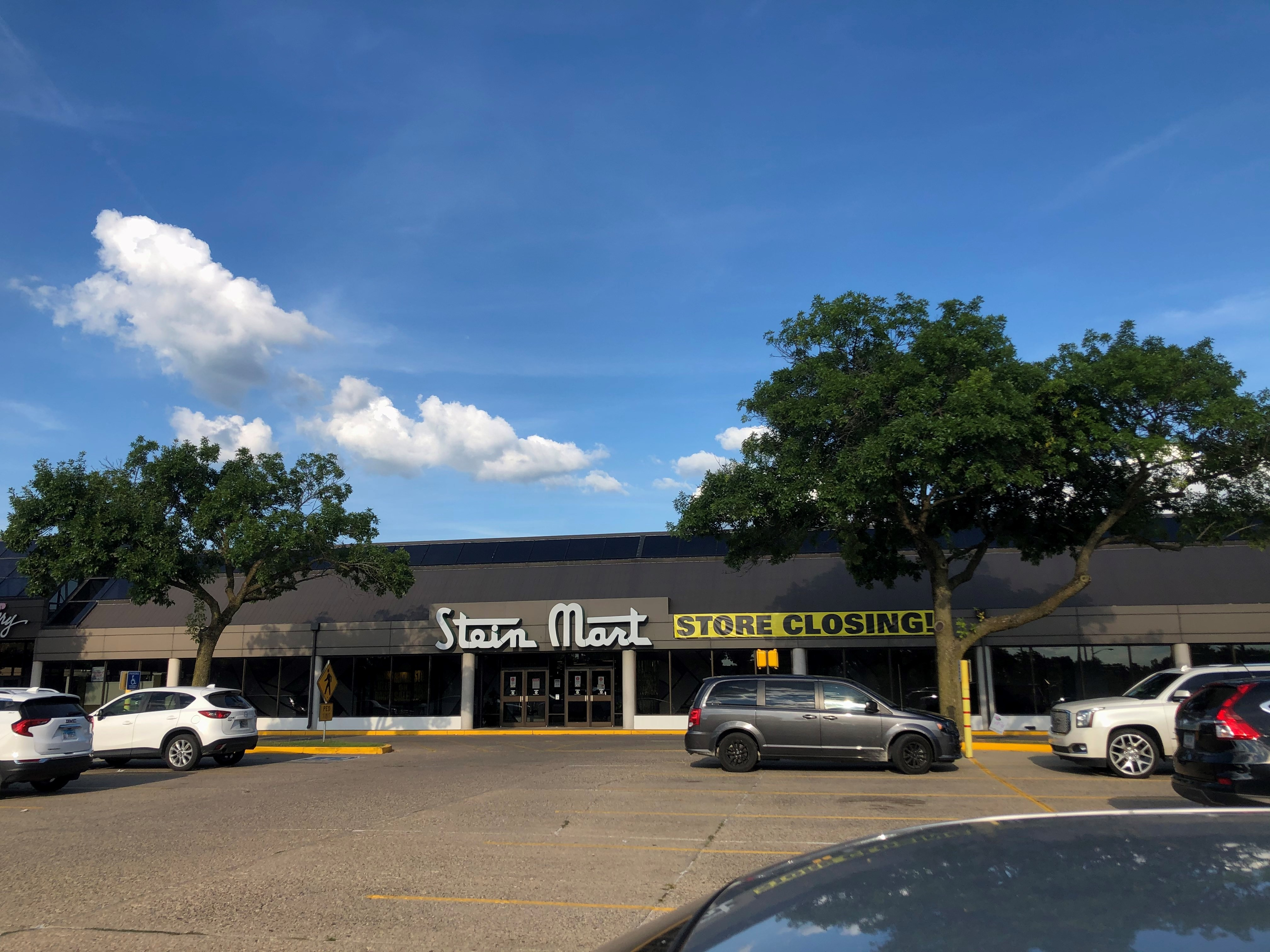
Stein Mart during liquidation

Stein Mart closed October 26, 2020, following the company's bankruptcy and liquidation.

It was announced in June 2021 that the former Stein Mart space will be split into two parts, with an Ace Hardware occupying on section, and the other half converted to more specialty store fronts.
