= Fort Wayne Citilink =

Public transit operator in Fort Wayne, Indiana, U.S.

Citilink

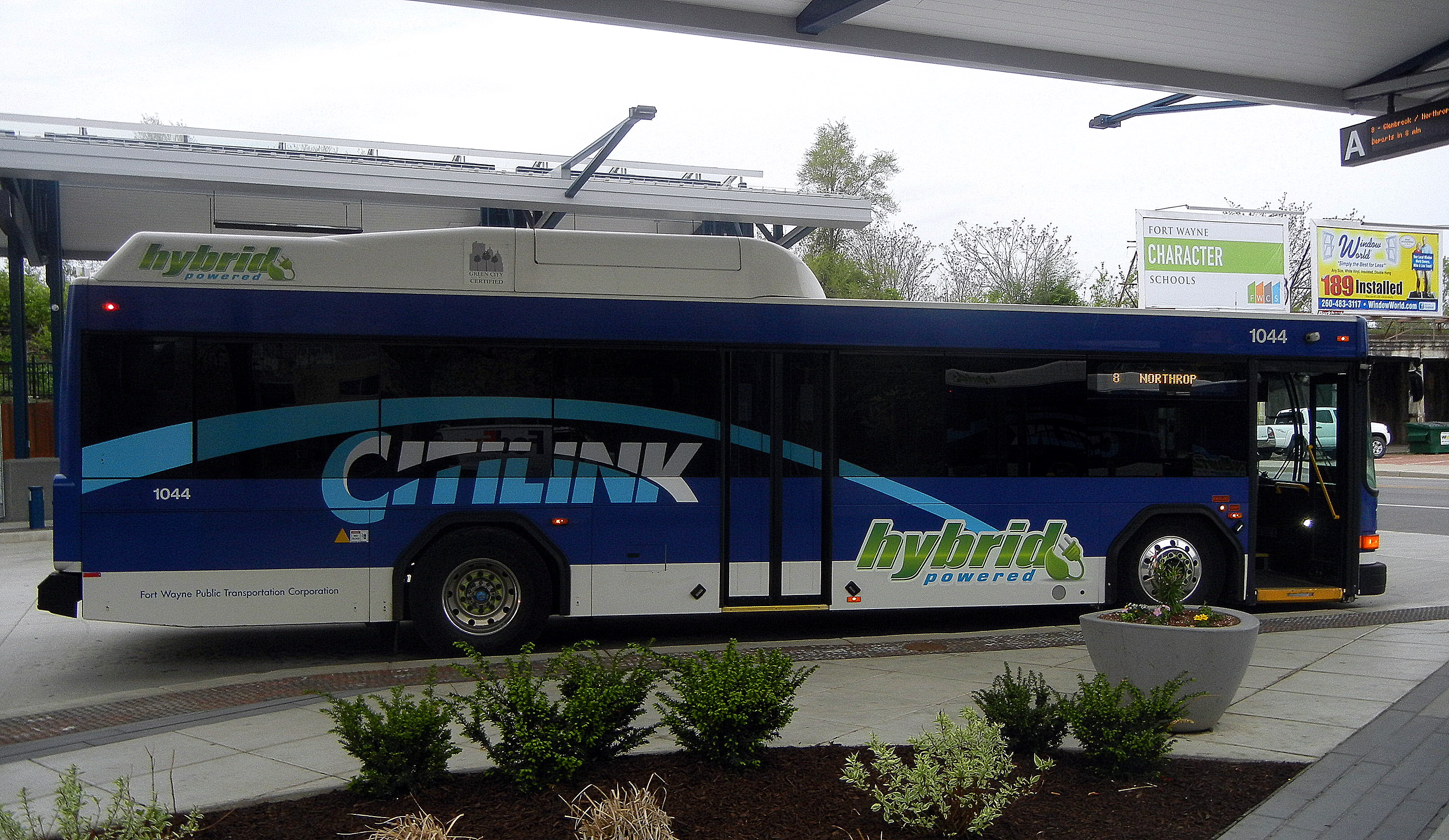
- Parent: Fort Wayne Public Transportation Corporation (FWPTC)
- Founded: 1968
- Headquarters: 801 Leesburg Road
- Locale: Fort Wayne and New Haven, Indiana
- Service type: transit bus, paratransit
- Routes: 12
- Hubs: 2
- Stations: 2
- Fleet: 51
- Annual ridership: 2,011,992
- Fuel type: Diesel
- Chief executive: John Metzinger (General Manager)
- Website: fwcitilink.com

The Fort Wayne Public Transportation Corporation (FWPTC), branded as Citilink, is the public transportation operator for the metro area of Fort Wayne and Allen County, Indiana. Transportation is provided Monday through Saturday on twelve fixed route lines plus two deviation routes. Citilink does not operate on Sundays and six holidays.

== History ==
Citizens Street Railroad Company introduces horse car service on Calhoun Street in 1872. The Centlivre Brewery started a horse car service on Spy Run serving the brewery in 1887. Fort Wayne Electric Railway company buys the lines and provides service with electric streetcars - adding service on Columbia Street - known as the Lakeside route in 1894. By the 1890s, service was operated by the Fort Wayne Traction Company.

Interurban service came to Fort Wayne in 1901 with service southwest to Huntington which consolidated with other interurban railway companies. This was what is today referred to as light rail. Individual cars, powered by electricity were operated by a motorman, with or without a conductor. Not only was intra-city transportation offered, but interurban as well. A number of systems were founded and investors merged them, so that by 1911 when it was reorganized as Fort Wayne Northern Indiana Traction Company, it reached Logansport, Bluffton and Wabash as well. In 1920, the company was purchased by Indiana Service Corporataion, who would go on to transfer the interurban operations to Indiana Railroad in 1930.

Fort Wayne was the center of the American light rail system, and boasted the only full cloverleaf in the world at "Transfer Corner", the intersection of Calhoun and Main. Despite the low cost - 25-mile trip to Bluffton cost 50 cents and took 52 minutes - ridership of the interurban system plummeted after a 1910 crash near Bluffton killed forty, and under pressure from auto ownership, never again reached 1910 levels.

The traction company required power generation to operate. In 1907, Griswald reported "The new power station of the Fort Wayne and Wabash Valley Traction Company was completed at a cost of $800,000." The building still exists as home for Science Central. As homeowners needed power for lighting at night, when there were no cars running, they sold the electricity to homeowners.

The interurban service of Indiana Railroad was discontinued in 1942 with the last streetcar being replaced with electric trolley buses in 1947. In 1948 Indiana Service Corporation sold the service to a private company called Fort Wayne Transit. By 1960 the last trolley bus was replaced with motor buses. By 1967 ridership of Fort Wayne Transit bus system was lagging and no longer profitable, as was the case for most bus companies at that time. The federal government established the Urban Mass Transportation Administration and offered grants to help cities support public transportation. The City of Fort Wayne established the Fort Wayne Public Transit Corporation as a public utility and purchased the assets of the private Fort Wayne Transit company in 1968. Citilink is one of the service marks used by the Fort Wayne PTC.

=== Hanna-Creighton Transit Center ===
Hanna-Creighton Transit Center is located at Hanna and Creighton in Southeast Fort Wayne. It was built in 2005 with the Pontiac Library, Fort Wayne Urban League and CANI Headstart. The amenities at this transit center there are two bus huts for three buses − 5, 6 and 7. Easy access to Pontiac Library, CANI Headstart and Fort Wayne Urban League from this transit center. It has a circular drive for buses to pick up and drop off and a waiting area in the Fort Wayne Urban League.

=== New Citilink Central Station ===
Citilink initiated efforts to develop an improved Downtown Transit Station in 2002. A site selection process identified a parking lot on Barr Street between Washington & Jefferson as optimum. After years of effort and preliminary design, inability to acquire sufficient property proved to be an insurmountable barrier. Other options were explored, and the decision was made to use property owned by Citilink at Baker & Calhoun, which had served as the south transit terminal several years ago. The facility was redesigned and received federal and local approvals. A construction contract for US$4.4 million has been awarded to Hamilton Hunter Builders. This was completed in September 2012.

The project plans call for a 2,700 square feet (250 m^{2}) building equipped with indoor restrooms, an information center and a drivers lounge. The property will also contain bus bays covered with large canopies to protect waiting passengers from rain and snow. Passengers and neighbors will be able to purchase bus passes, speak with customer service staff, pick up maps and schedules, wait in comfort inside or out, use the restroom, receive electronic messages regarding on-time status of buses and other notifications, enjoy the community park area, listen to musicians, eat lunch from one of the food vendors or vending machines, etc.

One of the benefits of the Baker Street site is the proximity to Fort Wayne's former Amtrak station. While passenger rail has not available in Fort Wayne as of 1990, should it return this placement would allow for an easy transfer. Discussions are underway to encourage Greyhound Lines/intercity bus service to operate out of the new facility and several parking spaces will be dedicated for passenger drop off/pick up for taxi, Countilink, social service, kiss and ride, etc. Bike racks and other amenities are incorporated into the design as well as pedestrian friendly features.

Design features were selected to complement surrounding architecture; red brick to match surrounding buildings, canopies reminiscent of Barr Street Market and the train station, two story building frontage, pouring patterns in sidewalk, decorative lighting, etc. With ridership at nearly two million passenger trips per year, Citilink will bring over 5,000 passengers/day to the station.

== CampusLink ==
Debuted in 2009, CampusLink is a free shuttle service for students, faculty, and the general public to travel between the Indiana University–Purdue University Fort Wayne campus and Ivy Tech Community College's Coliseum and North campuses, as well as shopping and residential areas. It is a free shuttle service Monday through Friday 7:30 am – 8:30 pm.

In Summer of 2012: The Citilink say the service will stay for two more years, the funding for this service will be share by IPFW and Ivy Tech until Spring of 2014. The Grant was ending in Spring of 2012. In 2015, the campusLink route was modified to serve primarily Ivy Tech Coliseum & North campus. IPFW funding was not renewed.

== Ridership ==
Ridership in 2011 was 2,011,992. In 2015, Citilink annual one way passenger trip ridership was 1,969,599.

== See also ==
- List of bus transit systems in the United States
- Marion Transit System
