= Cherryland =

Cherryland may refer to any of the following topics:

- Door County Cherryland Airport in Wisconsin, U.S.
- Cherryland, California, U.S.
- Traverse City, Michigan, U.S.
  - Cherryland Center in Traverse City, Michigan, U.S.
- Višnjica, Belgrade, Serbia
