= Haute City Center =

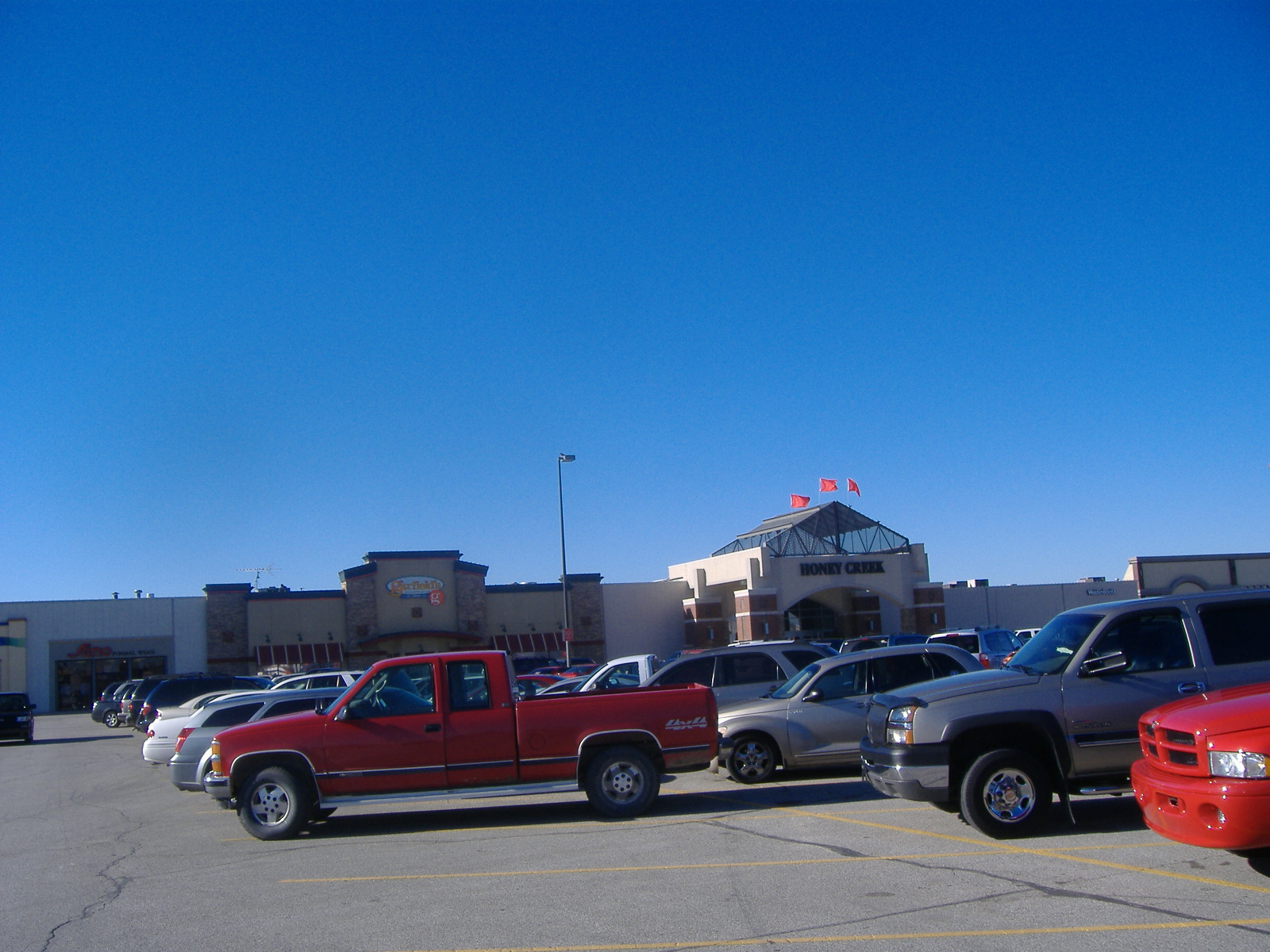
- Haute City Center
- Location: Terre Haute, Indiana, United States
- Coordinates: 39°25′38″N 87°25′03″W
- Opened: 1968
- Developer: Guthrie May
- Manager: JLL; Spinoso Real Estate Group
- Owner: Out of the Box Ventures
- Num. of stores: 85+
- Num. of anchor tenants: 4 (2 open, 2 vacant)
- Floor area: 680,890 square feet (63,257 m^{2})
- Floors: 1 (2 in former Macy's)
- Website: hautecitycenter.com

Haute City Center, formerly Honey Creek Mall, is a shopping center in Terre Haute, Indiana, with 680,890 sq ft (63,257 m^{2}) of gross leasing area. The mall has been owned by Out of the Box Ventures, a subsidiary of Lionheart Capital since 2019. The mall opened in 1968 as Honey Creek Square. The complex was expanded in 1973 and 1981, and was renovated in 1992 and 2007. The center was renamed to Honey Creek Mall at the time of the 1992 renovation. In 1999, a management contract for the mall was awarded to Trammell Crow Faison Regional Mall Services, a unit of Trammell Crow Co. of Dallas. The mall was then purchased by CBL & Associates Properties in 2004.

The mall's anchor stores are JCPenney and Vendors Village. There are 2 vacant anchor stores that were once Macy's and Sears. Vendors Village opened in the former Carson's space in November 2018.

The southern anchor building was originally Root Dry Goods, which was converted to L. S. Ayres in 1998 and Macy's in 2006. Carson's opened as Meis a store which re-located from downtown Terre Haute, and was later Elder-Beerman.

In 1983, the city of Terre Haute annexed the land on which the mall was situated.

On January 3, 2018, Macy's announced that they would close their store at the mall. This store closed in March 2018. In April 2018, Carson's parent company Bon-Ton filed for bankruptcy and closed all of its stores. In October 2018, Sears Holdings filed for bankruptcy and announced the closure of 142 stores including the unit at Honey Creek Mall which left JCPenney as the only traditional anchor.

The mall was renamed Haute City Center on December 16, 2019.

== See also ==
- List of shopping malls in the United States
