= Merchandise Mart (disambiguation) =

Merchandise Mart is a building in Chicago, Illinois.

Merchandise Mart may also refer to:

- Merchandise Mart station, a station on the Chicago Transit Authority's 'L' system
- Merchandise Mart Annex, also known as 350 West Mart Center in Chicago
- New York Merchandise Mart, a building in New York City
- AmericasMart, also known as the Atlanta Merchandise Mart
- K's Merchandise Mart, a catalog showroom department store based in Decatur, Illinois
