= Piqua Center =

- Location: Piqua, Ohio, United States
- Coordinates: 40°08′54″N 84°13′21″W
- Address: 987 East Ash Street
- Opened: 1988
- Developer: The Mall Company
- Owner: Bruns Construction Enterprises, Caspian Group
- Num. of anchor tenants: 4
- Floor area: 504,691 square feet (46,887.3 m^{2})
- Floors: 1 (5 in the Comfort Inn)

Piqua Center (formerly the Miami Valley Centre Mall) is an enclosed shopping mall in Piqua, Ohio, United States, opened in 1988. The mall's anchor store is Dunham's Sports. There are 3 vacant anchor stores that were once Sears, Elder-Beerman and JCPenney. The mall also has a Comfort Inn.

== History ==
One of the original anchors was J. C. Penney, which moved from a store downtown that had been operational since 1922. The other anchors were Elder-Beerman and Hills (later Ames).

In 1999, Sears moved to the mall from an existing store at nearby (now defunct) Piqua East Mall (formerly Piqua Mall). In reaction to this move, Elder-Beerman attempted to sue to keep Sears from opening there. The Sears store opened in October of that year. Later, a Little Professor bookstore opened in the mall. Previously, the mall did not have a bookstore.

Ames closed its store at the mall in 2000. Four years later, the space became Steve & Barry's. Other stores that opened in 2004 included Quiznos and CJ Banks. In 2008, the theater complex in the mall was replaced by a 504,691-square-foot (46,887.3 m^{2}) Cinemark complex on an outparcel. At the end of the same year, Steve & Barry's closed. In June 2014, it was reported that Dunham's Sports would be moving into the vacated Steve & Barry's by year's end.

Elder-Beerman closed on August 26, 2018, due to the bankruptcy of parent company The Bon-Ton.

After a November 8, 2018 announcement that Sears would be closing as part of a plan to close 40 locations, the store closed in February 2019.

On June 4, 2020, JCPenney announced that it would close by October 2020 as part of a plan to close 154 stores nationwide. After JCPenney closed, Dunham's Sports became the only remaining anchor store.

In March 2023, Kohan Retail Investment Group sold the Miami Valley Center Mall to a partnership between Ohio-based Bruns Construction Enterprises and Minnesota-based Caspian Group, which renamed it the Piqua Center. It was reported in early 2024 that the mall would be redeveloped to a mixed-use center, with 245,000 sq ft (22,800 m^{2}) for business incubator spaces, including warehousing and e-commerce; 192,000 sq ft (17,800 m^{2}) for retail and boutiques; and 86,000 sq ft (8,000 m^{2}) for entertainment and dining. RCS Construction and Glassco have signed leases in the warehousing area. The owners have leveled-up the sloping floor of the former in-line theater complex with 100,000 tons (91,000 metric tons) of gravel; this space houses Hero Day Action Park, one of a small chain of indoor inflatable arcades/playgrounds, which includes a mezzanine level and a snack bar. Smile Back Training Center, a mixed martial arts gym is at the mall. The mall already contains an American Freight furniture and mattress store, which it will retain, and there is planned to be a Do It Best hardware store and Mexican restaurant Las Marias. The food court is to be renovated, with a glass-walled bar in the center of the space; additionally, activity-driven businesses, e.g. a redemption arcade, axe throwing or pickleball are planned to be located in the food court area. The owners have contemplated further uses for the property after 2024, including an outdoor marketplace and apartments that could be built on unused areas of the parking lots.

In July 2025, the mall announced that "The Social", a food hall with six dining options and a bar, was scheduled to open in the fall of 2025. An arcade and event space are planned for future development.
