= Grand Traverse Mall =

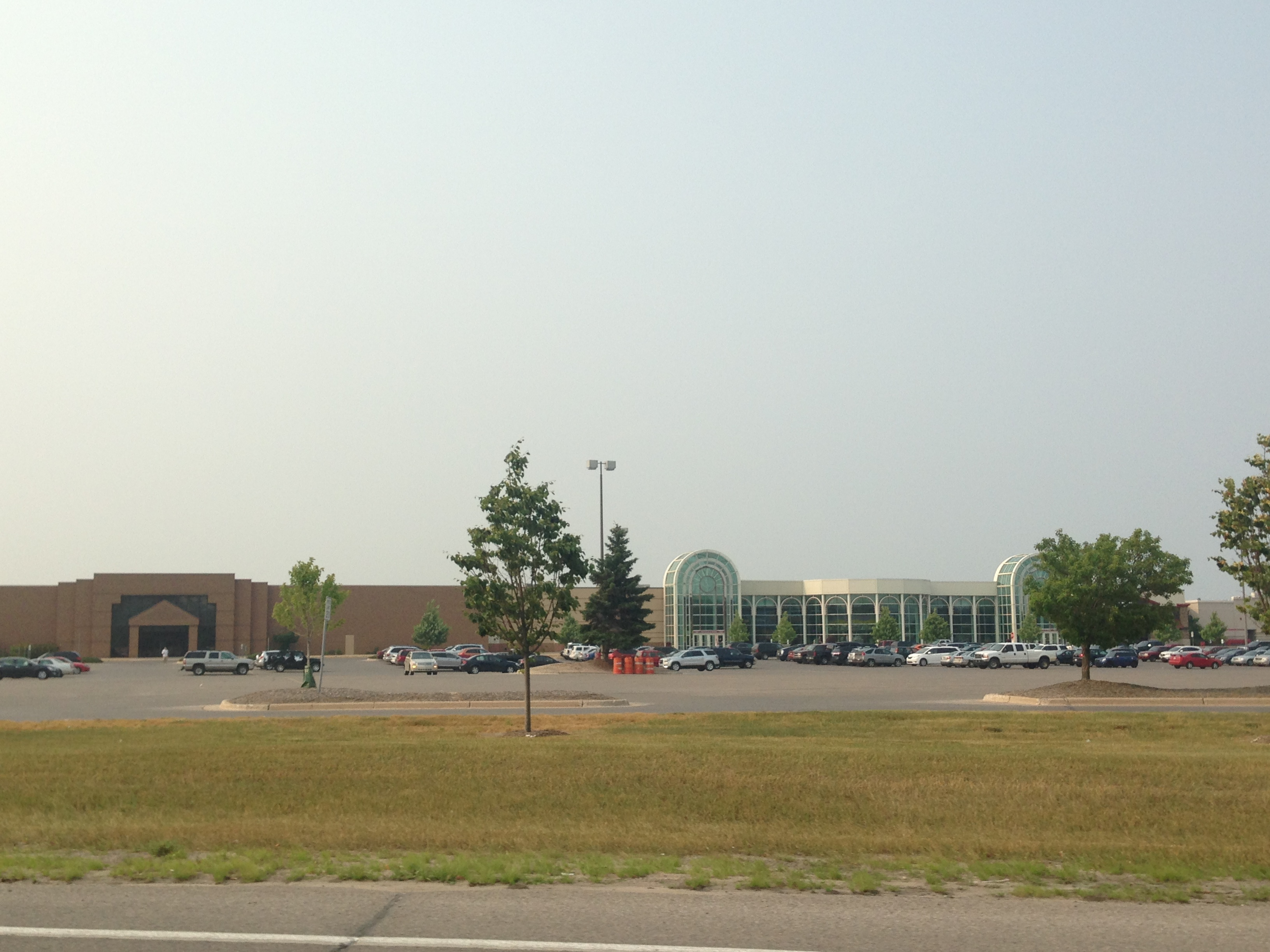
- South side of Grand Traverse Mall from South Airport Road
- Location: Garfield Township, Grand Traverse County, Michigan (Traverse City address)
- Coordinates: 44.725°N 85.64°W
- Address: 3200 South Airport Road West
- Opened: March 1992; 34 years ago
- Developer: General Growth Properties
- Manager: Mason Asset Management
- Owner: Namdar Realty Group
- Num. of stores: 70
- Num. of anchor tenants: 5 (4 open, 1 under construction)
- Floor area: 598,442 square feet (55,597.1 m^{2}) (GLA)
- Floors: 1
- Public transit: BATA

Grand Traverse Mall is an enclosed shopping mall serving Traverse City, Michigan, located in Garfield Township. Opened in 1992, the mall features four anchor stores: Dunham's Sports, JCPenney, Ollie's Bargain Outlet, and Target. It is owned and managed by Mason Asset Management and Namdar Realty Group. The previous owner and manager was Brookfield Properties, and the mall was developed by General Growth Properties.

== History ==
The mall opened in phases: JCPenney and Target opened in October 1991, followed by the mall itself in March 1992 and Hudson's in July. It featured 110 stores and a nine-screen Kerasotes Theatres complex, making it the largest mall north of Saginaw, Michigan. As with all other Hudson's stores in Michigan, the Grand Traverse Mall location converted to Marshall Field's in 2001 and Macy's in 2006.

Before its opening, it was involved in a lawsuit started by an existing mall in town (Cherryland Mall, now Cherryland Center) over concerns that mall construction would pollute a nearby creek, and that it would add too much retail space to the region. This lawsuit was settled out of court. Another lawsuit, regarding conflict of interest among township officials who sold land to the mall developers, was ruled in favor of the developers. General Growth Properties, which developed the mall, transferred ownership to Rouse Properties in 2012.

In October 2014, a body was found at the mall, causing it to be closed for a day while the body was investigated. The body was eventually determined to be a night-shift custodian, 64-year-old Ricky Alan Billings. He was found to have died of a heart attack some time after the closing of the mall. Gap and Old Navy both closed at nearby Horizon Outlets (now Buffalo Ridge Shopping Center), both moving into new spaces at Grand Traverse Mall. The space occupied by Old Navy was previously an f.y.e. store and the space occupied by Gap was previously an Abercrombie & Fitch and Toys R Us Express. The Gap closed in 2021.

The mall's movie theater complex closed in 2015 when a newer theater was built by owner Carmike Cinemas. Mall officials announced in 2016 that the theater space would be demolished for a Dick's Sporting Goods, originally to open in Fall 2016. Dick's canceled its plans to open the store in December 2016. The space instead became Dunham's Sports. The store opened on October 27, 2017.

An H&M clothing store, added to the mall in 2017, closed in 2021. It was replaced by Grand Traverse Bay Gymnastics in 2021. The mall also gained Shoe Dept. Encore in 2019. TJ Maxx relocated out of the mall in mid-2024.

In January 2025, Macy's announced that its store at Grand Traverse Mall would close in the first quarter of 2025. The store closed on March 23, 2025.

On March 18, 2026, Ollie's Bargain Outlet opened in the former TJ Maxx space.

In 2026, the former Macy’s department store was converted into a multi-tenant retail space that will house five new tenants. Redevelopment of the former Macy’s started in 2025. As of 2026, the space is under construction in an active build-out phase with new tenants expected to open soon. In the former Macy’s parking lot, Chipotle is building a new restaurant.

== Gallery ==
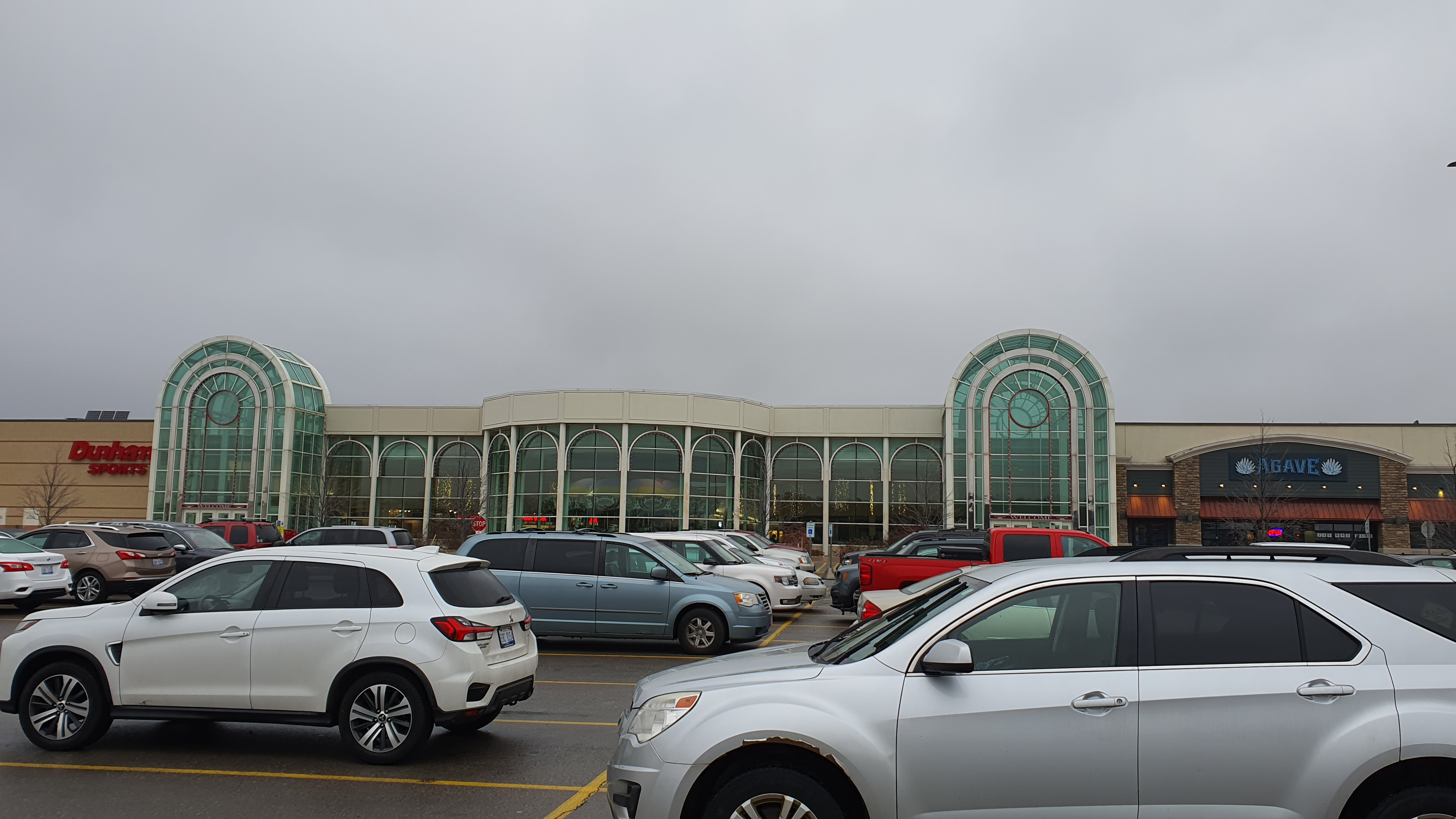
Exterior of the mall

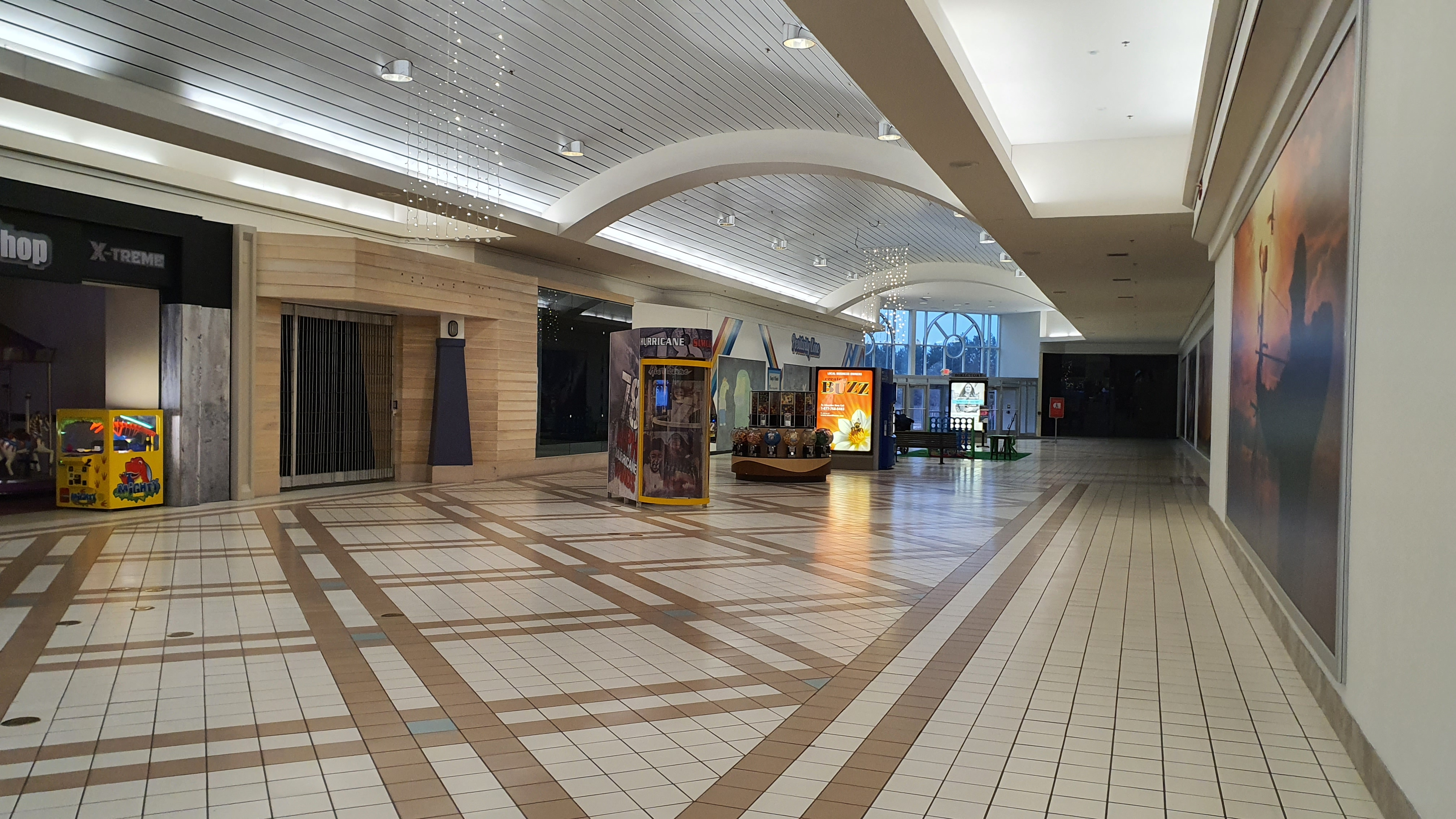
A concourse within the mall

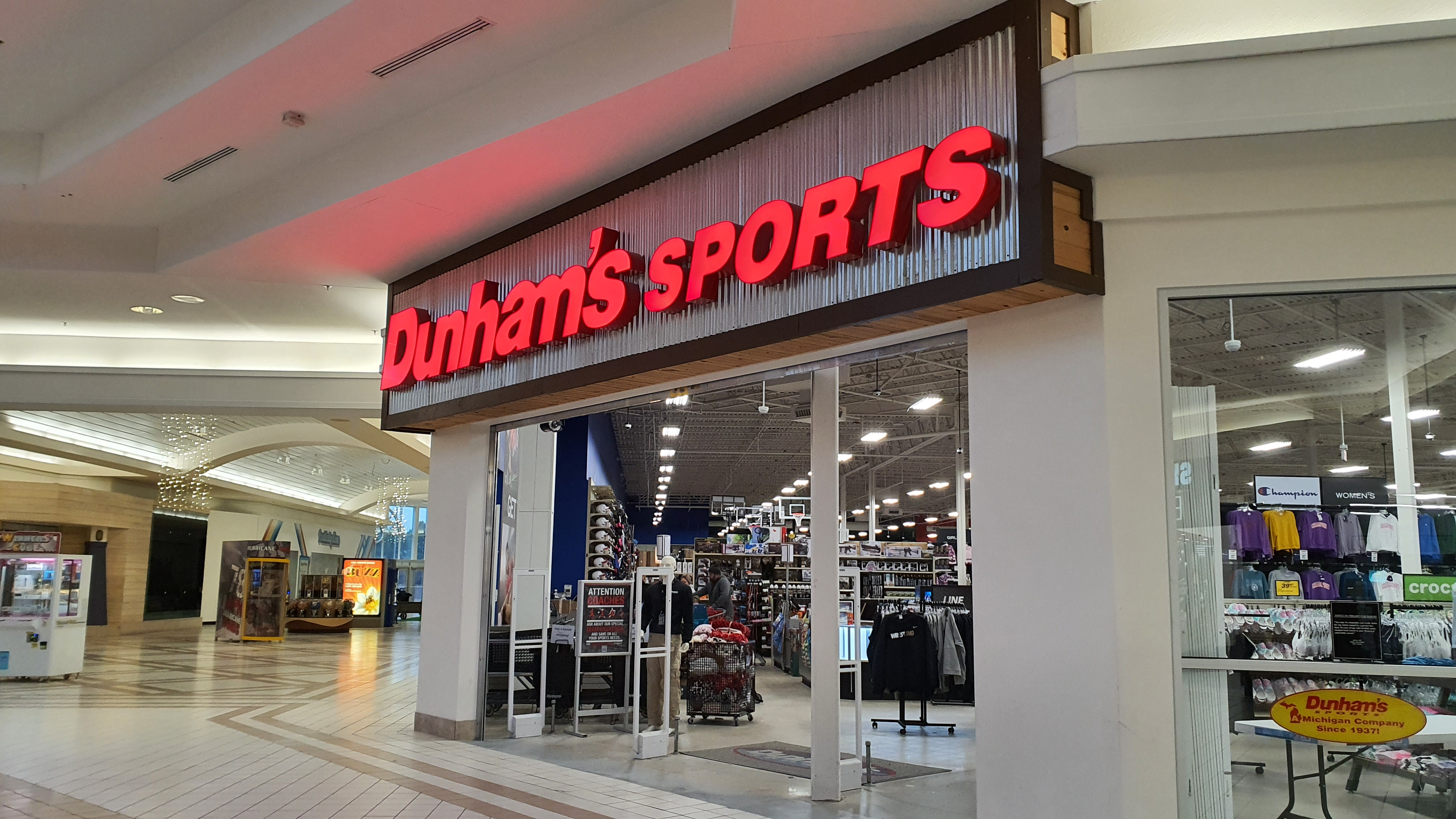
Dunham's Sports interior entrance

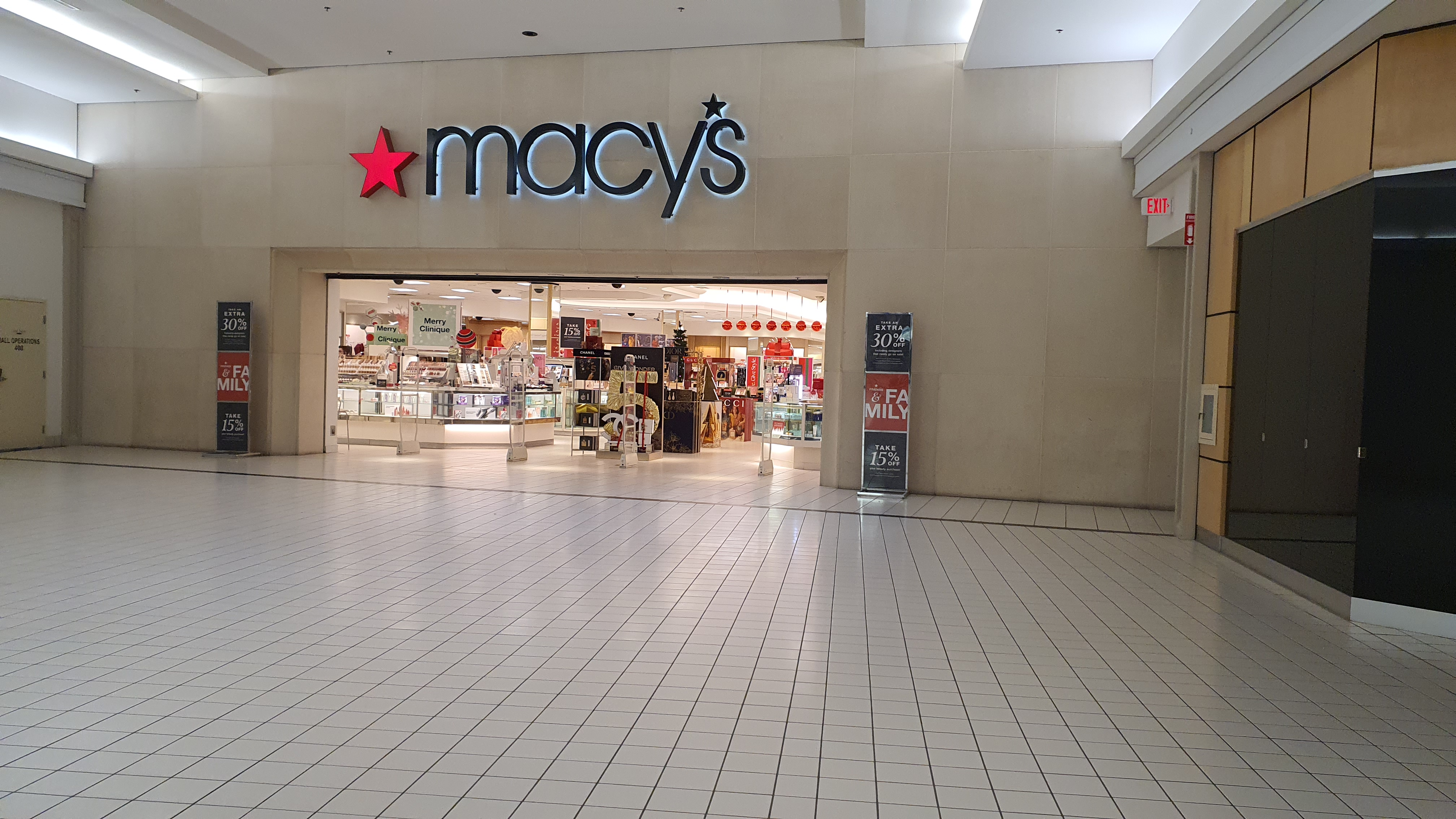
Macy's interior entrance

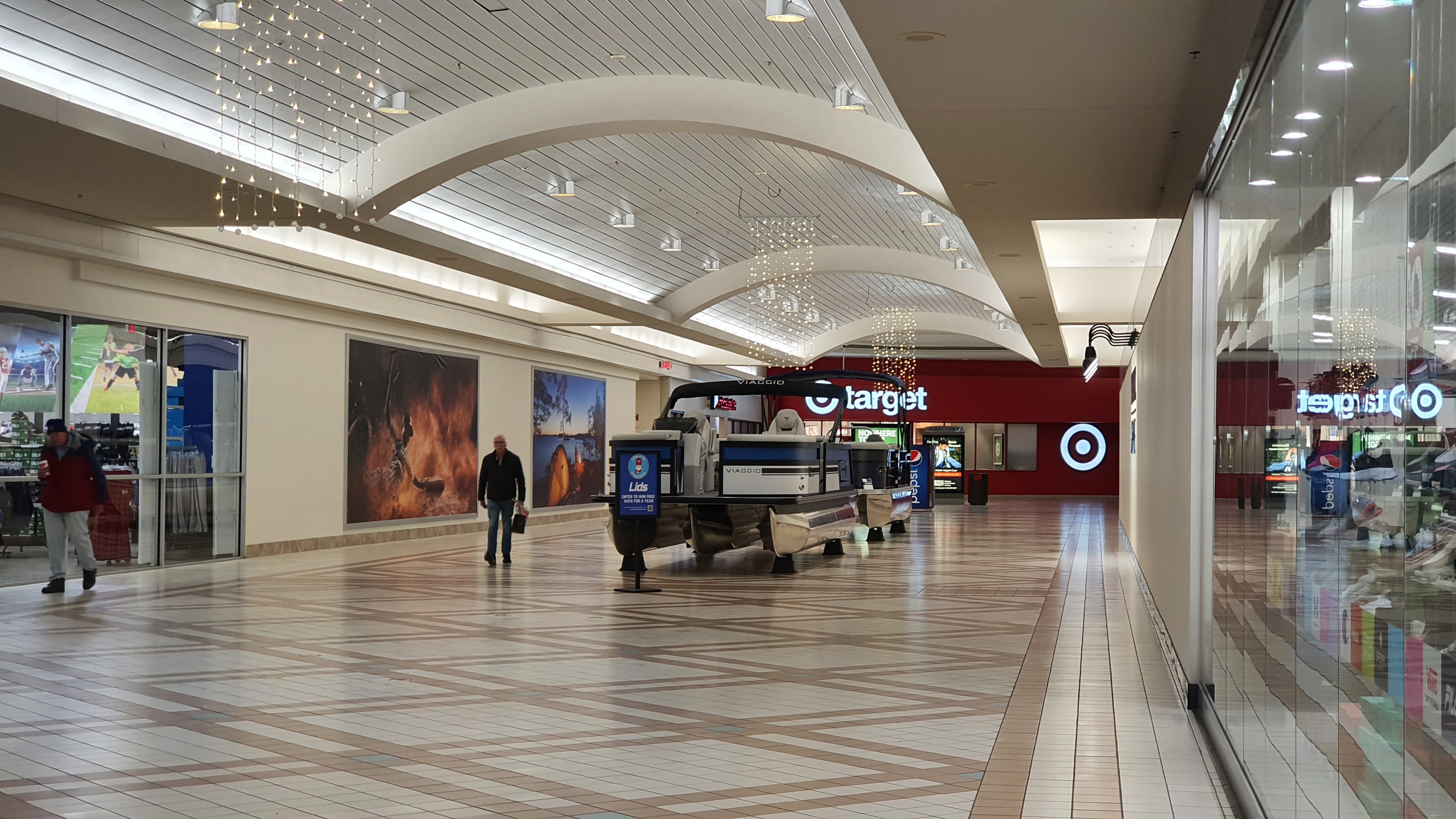
Target interior entrance

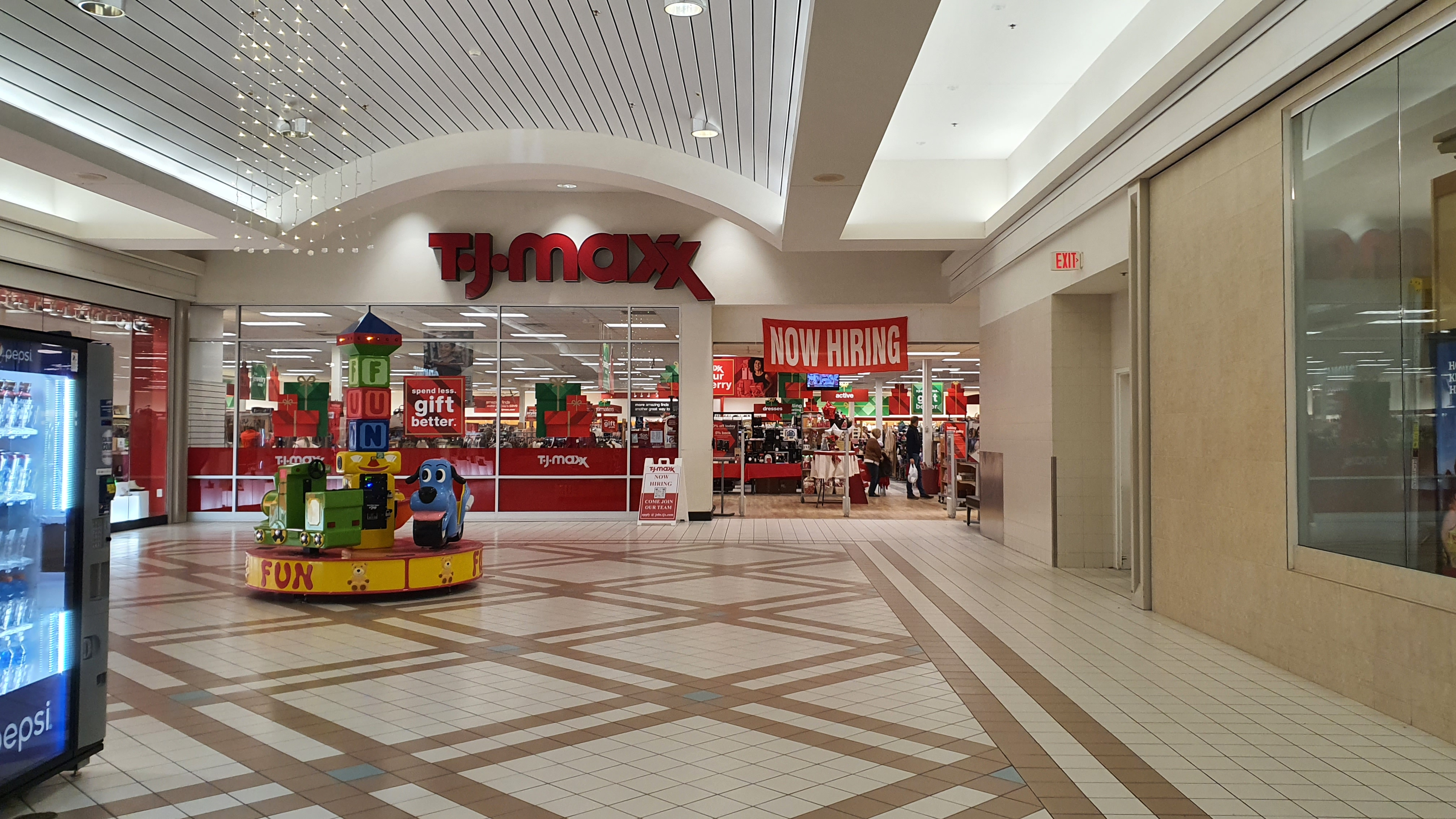
TJ Maxx interior entrance

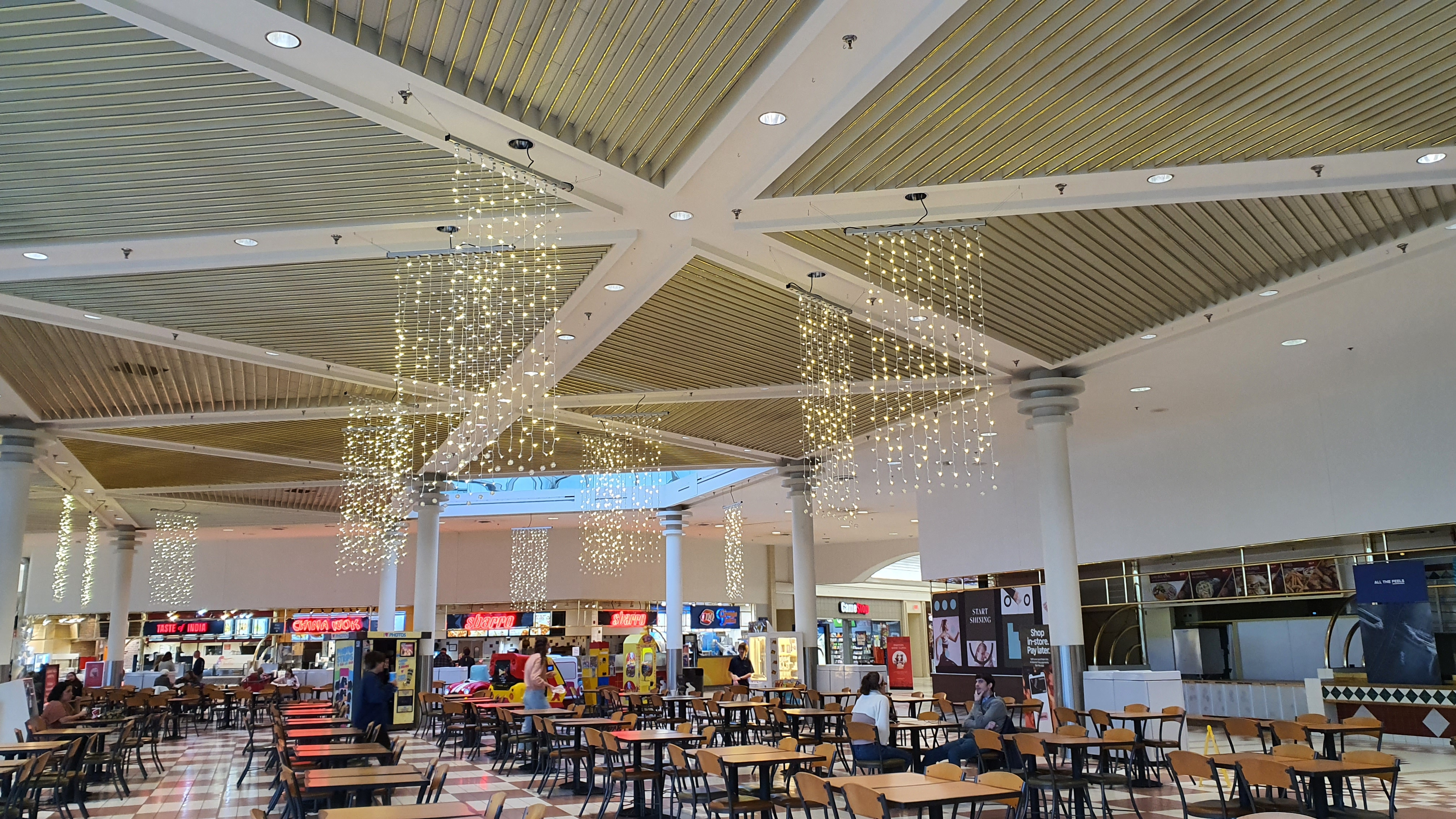
Grand Traverse Mall food court

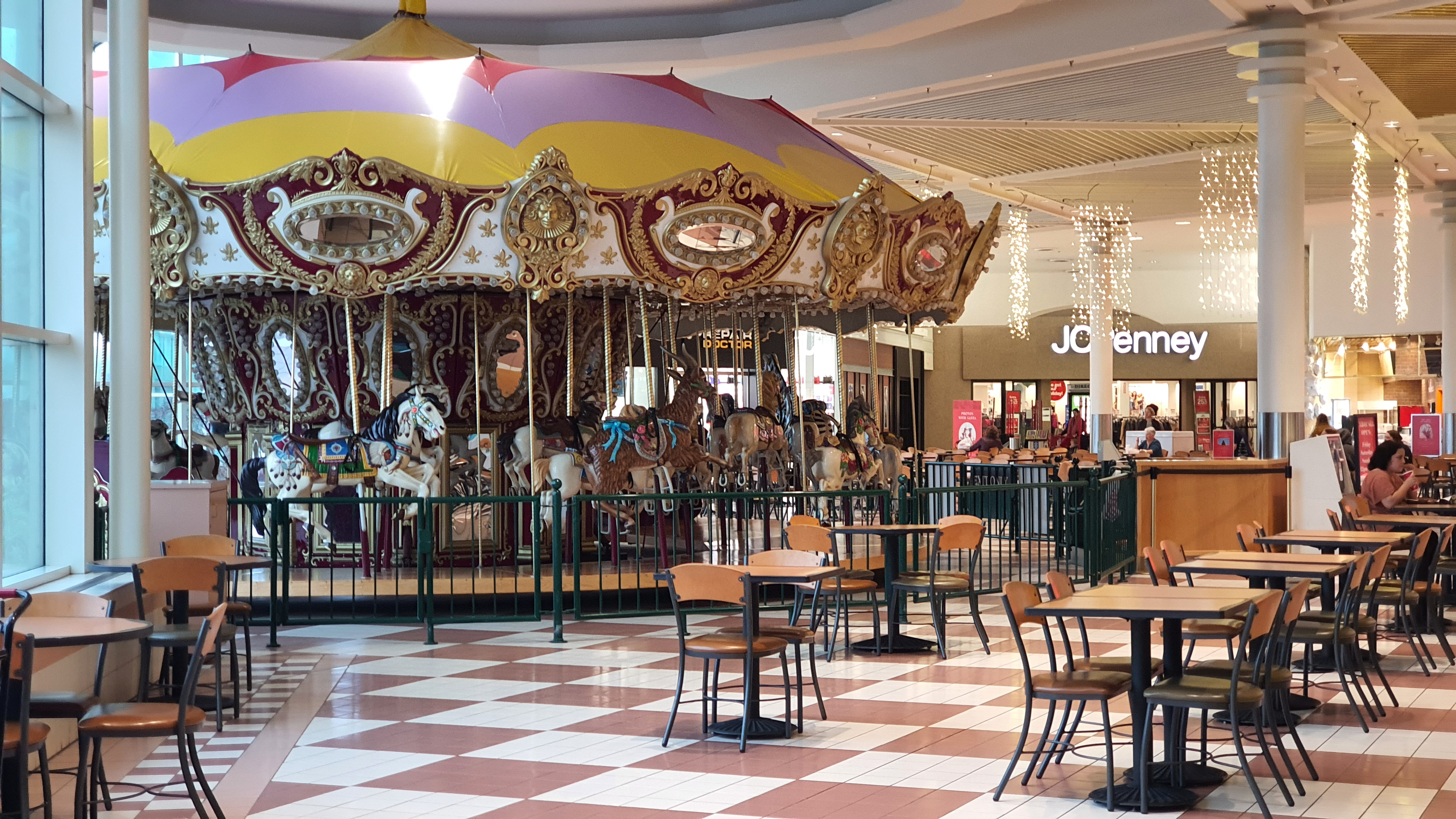
Carousel
