= Cherry Capital Airport =

Airport in Michigan, United States

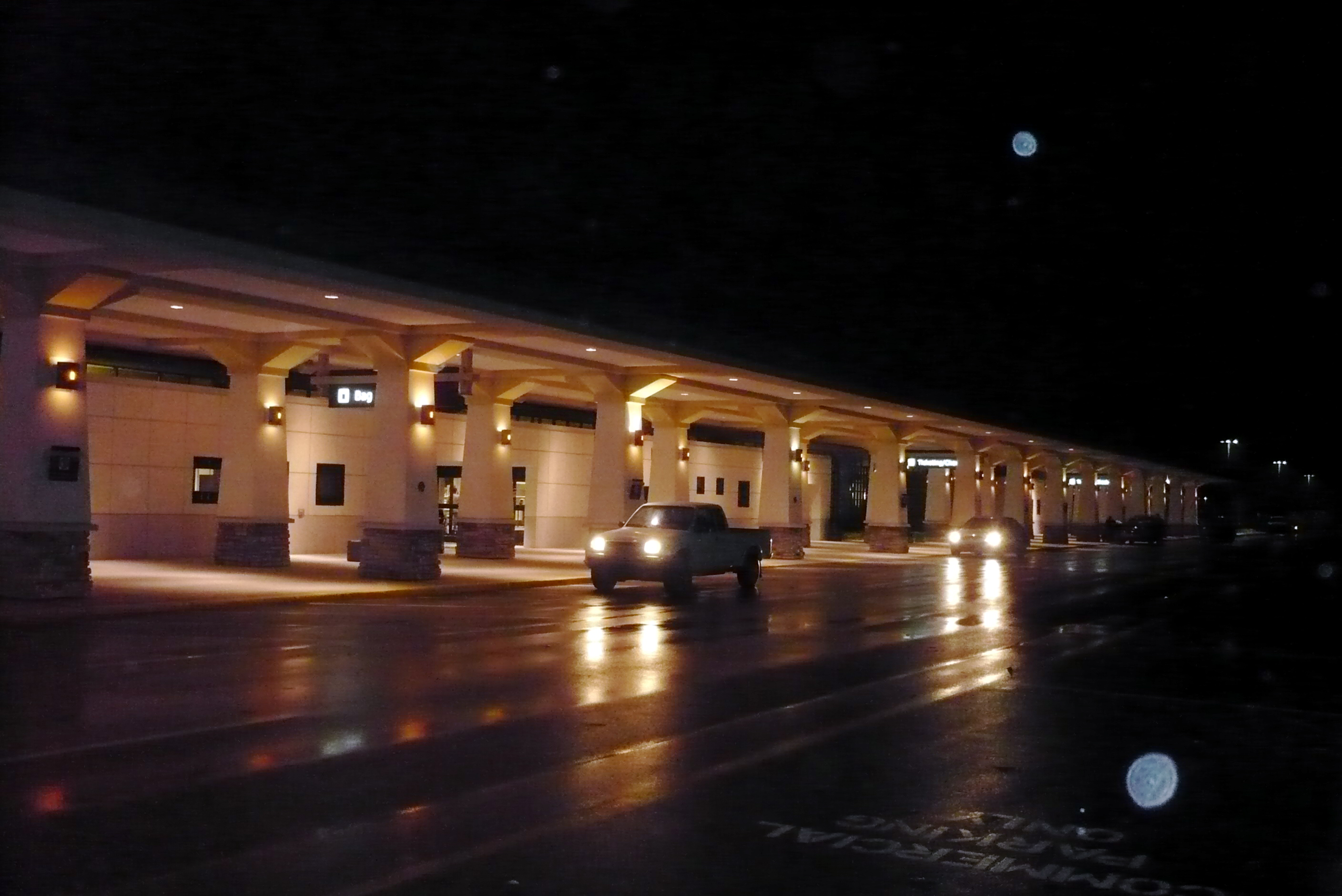
- Cherry Capital Airport terminal
- IATA: TVC; ICAO: KTVC; FAA LID: TVC

Summary
- Airport type: Public
- Owner: Northwest Regional Airport Authority
- Serves: Traverse City, Michigan
- Time zone: UTC−05:00 (-5)
- Elevation AMSL: 624 ft (190 m)
- Coordinates: 44°44′30″N 085°34′56″W
- Website: www.tvcairport.com

Maps
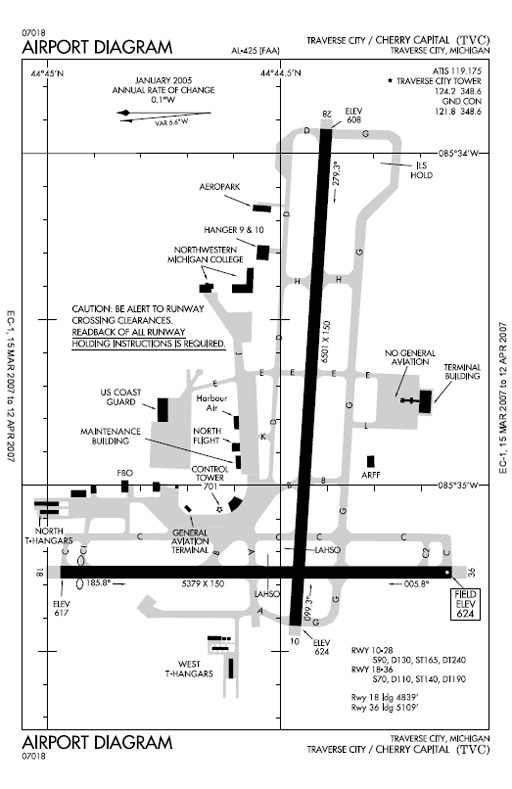
- FAA airport diagram
- Interactive map of Cherry Capital Airport

Runways
| Direction | Length | | Surface |
| Direction | ft | m | Surface |
|---|---|---|---|
| 10/28 | 7,016 | 2,138 | Asphalt |
| 18/36 | 5,378 | 1,639 | Asphalt |

Statistics (2025)
- Total passengers: 935,816
- Aircraft operations: 86,926
- Sources: Michigan DOT

Cherry Capital Airport (IATA: TVC, ICAO: KTVC, FAA LID: TVC) is a commercial and general aviation airport located in Traverse City, Michigan, United States. The airport is located two nautical miles (2.3 mi; 3.7 km) southeast of the central business district of Traverse City. The airport is categorized by the Federal Aviation Administration (FAA) as a non-hub primary commercial service facility.

Cherry Capital Airport is the third-busiest airport in Michigan, after those of Detroit and Grand Rapids. It is the largest and busiest airport in Northern Michigan, with 700,699 total passengers in 2023. The airport is owned and operated by the Northwest Regional Airport Authority, which was created in 2022. Previously, the airport was jointly owned and operated by Grand Traverse and Leelanau counties.

The airport is home to U.S. Coast Guard Air Station Traverse City, which has been operational since 1946.

== History ==
Cherry Capital Airport was opened in 1936 as Traverse City Airport, replacing Ransom Field. The airport was moved onto the Coast Guard Air Station, which at the time was a naval air station that had opened in 1946. The airport opened with four runways, all but one of which have been replaced. Remnants of the former runways exist to this day, with some being left abandoned and privately owned.

In October 2004, Cherry Capital opened a new terminal on the south side of the east–west runway, demolishing the old one on the north side. This project also reconfigured the runways, marking the removal of the third diagonal runway. This development has seen an increase in various carriers offering seasonal service and destinations.

The airport experiences severe snowfall in the winter and has put many resources into snow and ice control. The airport was the ninth to implement the advanced security measures suggested after the September 11, 2001, attacks.

In 2013 and 2017, the airport extended the east–west runway to accommodate more flights to more locations, possibly to upgrade to an international airport for Air Canada Express flights.

In October 2017, a Costco store opened next to the airport entrance on a property leased to the warehouse chain for 60 years.

The airport saw upgrades to its parking lot and TSA checkpoint in 2022. This allowed for an additional 424 parking spots and a third TSA checkpoint line that can accommodate modern screening technology. The airport also added a hybrid USO location to assist soldiers traveling through.

Also in 2022, the Northwest Regional Airport Authority was established to operate the airport, after years of operation by Grand Traverse and Leelanau counties.

The airport received $14 million in 2020 as part of the federal CARES act to help it maintain operations and complete upgrades during the COVID-19 pandemic.

The airport set passenger records in 2021 and 2022 despite a drop in the number of flights passing through, making it the No. 3 airport in Michigan.

The airport was host to campaign events held by gubernatorial candidate Tudor Dixon during the 2022 midterm elections.

In February 2023, Cherry Capital Airport was selected as a recipient of a $5 million grant under the Airport Terminals Program, a component of the Infrastructure Investment and Jobs Act of 2021, to replace its passenger jetways to modernize the boarding process.

In 2025, Cherry Capital Airport experienced a 19% growth in passenger numbers, recording 935,816 total passengers that year. In response, in April 2026, Cherry Capital Airport broke ground on a $120 million, multi year expansion of the existing terminal. Dubbed “Concourse B”, the expansion will add four new gates to the terminal, located approximately 600 feet to the east of the current concourse. The new concourse is expected to open sometime in 2028.

== Facilities and aircraft ==
The air traffic control tower at Cherry Capital Airport, completed in 2013, stands 165 feet (50 m) tall.

The airport has one concourse with six gates. Cherry Capital Airport covers an area of 1,026 acres (415 ha) at an elevation of 624 feet (190 m) above mean sea level. It has two asphalt paved runways: 10/28 is 7,016 by 150 feet (2,138 by 46 m) and 18/36 is 5,378 by 150 feet (1,639 by 46 m).

For the 12-month period ending December 31, 2021, the airport had 101,106 aircraft operations, an average of 277 per day: 75% general aviation, 11% scheduled commercial, 8% air taxi, and 6% military. At that time, there were 125 aircraft based at this airport: 98 single-engine and 15 multi-engine airplanes, 5 helicopters, and 7 jets.

In February 2009, Forbes magazine ranked Cherry Capital Airport second in their list of the top ten "rip-off" airports in the United States, citing an average cost per mile to travelers departing TVC of 41 cents.

The Coast Guard Air Station hangar on the grounds of Cherry Capital Airport.

The airport has one fixed-base operator, AvFlight.

=== Ground transportation ===
The Bay Area Transportation Authority (BATA) serves the airport terminal and links to downtown Traverse City and other locations in the surrounding area.

== Airlines and destinations ==
=== Passenger ===
| Airlines | Destinations |
|---|---|
| Allegiant Air | Seasonal: Orlando/Sanford, Phoenix/Mesa, Punta Gorda (FL), St. Petersburg/Clearwater |
| American Airlines | Seasonal: Dallas/Fort Worth |
| American Eagle | Chicago–O'Hare; Seasonal: Boston, Charlotte, Dallas/Fort Worth, New York–LaGuardia, Philadelphia, Washington–National |
| Delta Air Lines | Detroit |
| Delta Connection | Detroit; Seasonal: Boston, Minneapolis/St. Paul, New York–LaGuardia |
| JetBlue | Seasonal: Boston |
| United Airlines | Chicago–O'Hare; Seasonal: Denver, Los Angeles (begins June 19, 2027), San Francisco (begins June 19, 2027) |
| United Express | Chicago–O'Hare; Seasonal: Houston–Intercontinental, Newark |

Destinations map
Destinations from Cherry Capital Airport
Red = Year-round destination
Green = Seasonal destination
Blue = Future destination
Pink = Destination being terminated

== Statistics ==
=== Top domestic destinations ===
Top destinations from TVC (September 2025 – August 2026)
| Rank | Airport | Passengers | Carriers |
|---|---|---|---|
| 1 | Chicago–O'Hare, Illinois | 196,520 | American, United |
| 2 | Detroit, Michigan | 89,490 | Delta |
| 3 | Denver, Colorado | 27,210 | United |
| 4 | Dallas/Fort Worth, Texas | 19,290 | American |
| 5 | Charlotte, North Carolina | 16,610 | American |
| 6 | Boston, Massachusetts | 16,150 | American, Delta, JetBlue |
| 7 | Minneapolis/St. Paul, Minnesota | 16,120 | Delta, Sun Country |
| 8 | St. Petersburg/Clearwater, Florida | 14,750 | Allegiant |
| 9 | Orlando–Sanford, Florida | 14,390 | Allegiant |
| 10 | Punta Gorda, Florida | 10,280 | Allegiant |

=== Airline market share ===
Largest airlines at TVC (September 2025 – August 2026)
| Rank | Airline | Passengers | Share |
|---|---|---|---|
| 1 | Skywest | 219,000 | 23.71% |
| 2 | United | 141,000 | 15.29% |
| 3 | Republic | 104,000 | 11.26% |
| 4 | Allegiant | 93,710 | 10.17% |
| 5 | Delta | 87,200 | 9.46% |
| | Others | 278,000 | 30.12% |

== Accidents and incidents ==
- Pinnacle Airlines Flight 4712 was a Bombardier CRJ200 from Minneapolis-St. Paul, which overran the runway while landing at TVC during a snowstorm on April 12, 2007. In its Report to Congress, the National Transportation Safety Board wrote that "the aircraft received substantial damage, but the 52 people on board were not injured. The Board determined that the probable cause of this accident was the pilots' decision to land at TVC without performing a landing distance assessment, which was required by company policy. This poor decision-making likely reflected the effects of fatigue produced by a long, demanding duty day, and, for the captain, the duties associated with performing check airman functions. Contributing to the accident were the Federal Aviation Administration pilot flight and duty time regulations that permitted the pilots' long, demanding duty day and the TVC operations supervisor's use of ambiguous and unspecific radio phraseology in providing runway braking information. Four safety recommendations were issued to the FAA addressing timely post-accident drug testing, training on landing distance assessment performance, ground operations personnel communications, and criteria for runway closures in snow and ice conditions. The NTSB adopted the report on June 10, 2008."

== See also ==
- List of airports in Michigan
