= Stein Mart =

American discount department store chain from 1908 to 2020

Coordinates: 30.31813°N 81.65839°W

Stein Mart Online Inc.

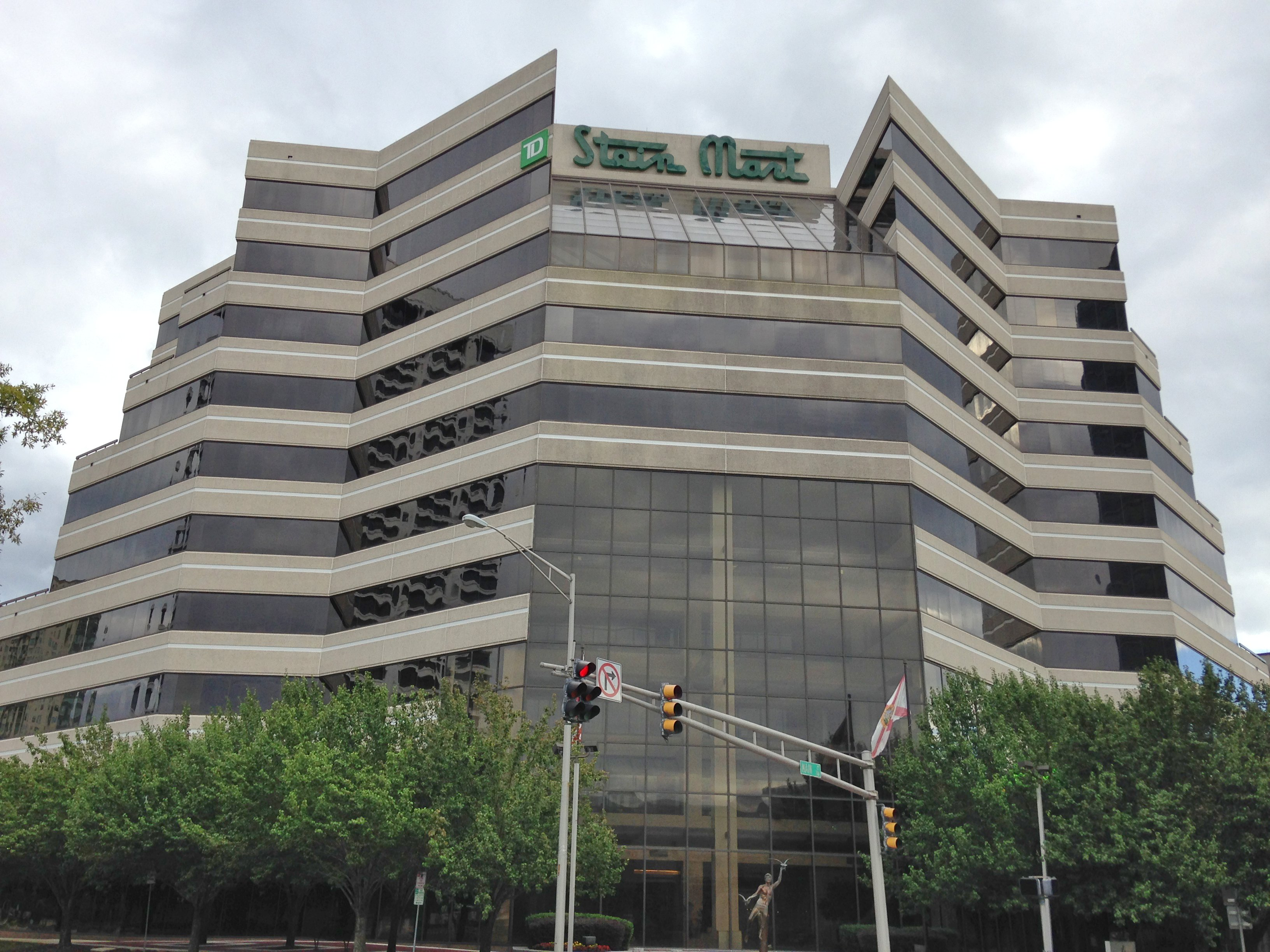
- Industry: Retail (Department stores)
- Founded: November 12, 1964; 61 years ago Greenville, Mississippi, U.S.
- Founder: Jake Stein
- Defunct: 2020; 6 years ago (retail stores only)
- Fate: Chapter 11 bankruptcy protection in 2020, in response to the COVID-19 pandemic and relaunched as Stein Mart Online Inc
- Headquarters: 1200 Riverplace Blvd. Jacksonville, Florida, U.S.
- Number of locations: 283 (March 2019)
- Key people: Jay Stein (Chairman); David Hunt Hawkins (CEO); Gregory W. Kleffner (EVP, Finance and CFO); MaryAnne Morin (President)
- Products: Boutique, apparel, footwear, linens, and home decor
- Revenue: ▲US$1.36 billion (2016)
- Operating income: ▼US$3.57 million (2016)
- Net income: ▼US$401,000 (2016)
- Total assets: ▲US$527.85 million (2016)
- Total equity: ▼US$70.26 million (2016)
- Owner: Omni Retail Enterprises
- Number of employees: 11,000 (2017)
- Website: www.steinmart.com

Stein Mart is an American discount men's and women's online retailer & former department store chain based in Jacksonville, Florida. Stein Mart had locations primarily in the Southeast, Texas, and California. Stein Mart stores sold recent trends in clothing for both men and women. Additionally, home decor, accessories, and shoes were all available at discounted prices.

In August 2020, the company announced that it had filed for Chapter 11 bankruptcy due to the COVID-19 pandemic, and that it planned to close all of its 279 stores. Stein Mart continues to operate as an online retailer, which is not related to the former company.

On March 2, 2023, Retail Ecommerce Ventures, Stein Mart's current parent, announced that it was mulling a possible bankruptcy filing. Stein Mart returned in 2026 after the brand was bought by Omni Retail Enterprises.

== History ==
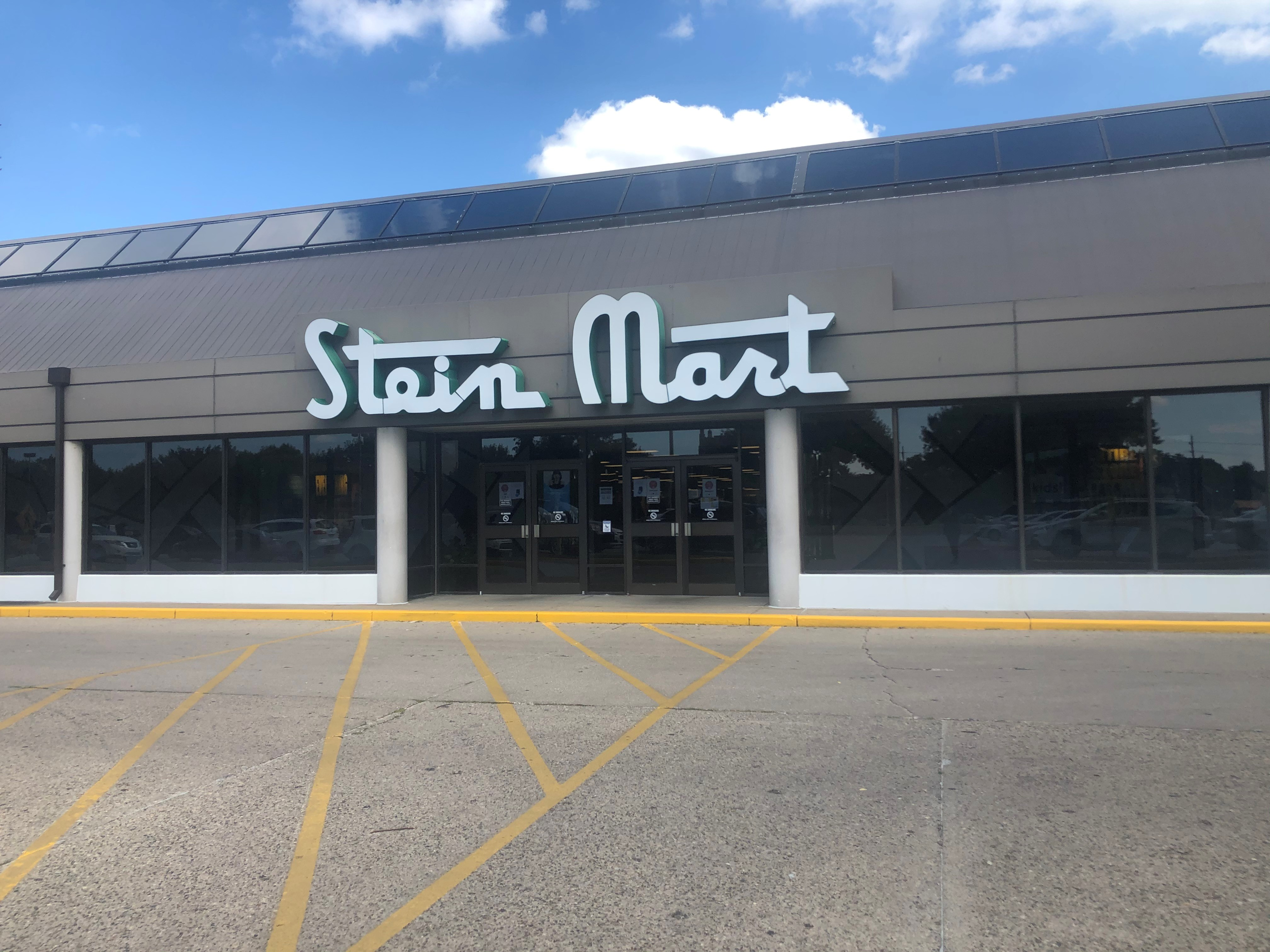
Stein Mart Store #87 at the Meadows Shopping Center, Terre Haute, Indiana

The predecessor to Stein Mart, Sam Stein's, was a full-line department store founded in 1908 by Samuel Stein, a Belarusian-Jewish immigrant who opened his first store on Walnut Street in Greenville, Mississippi; he had arrived there by steamboat from New York City three years before. In 1925, he moved the store to Washington Avenue, and in 1928 moved down the street to larger premises, which would later be expanded further in the 1930s. Sam's son, Jake Stein, took over the company upon his father Sam's death in 1933. The original department store business would remain open until at least 1980.

Keeping with the trend among department stores in the early 1960s, Stein's devised their own self-service discount store concept. A stretch of buildings facing Washington Street, between Walnut and Poplar, were acquired by Stein's in late 1963, and an adjoining 50,000 square foot space was secured to expand the property in 1964. Demolition and renovations on the property began on June 1, 1964, and the first Stein Mart store held its grand opening at the 200 block of Washington Avenue on November 12, 1964. The original Stein Mart store would be razed at an unknown date, later becoming a small park later known as Stein Mart Square; now the site of a federal courthouse expected to open in 2027.

By the late 1970s, Stein Mart had become a leading retailer of clothing for families in the Mississippi Delta. The chain targeted customers who shopped department stores on a regular basis, inducing them to purchase goods by offering discounts of 25 to 60 percent off department store prices. A second location was opened at the Summer Center in Memphis, Tennessee on September 8, 1977, with opening-day merchandising consisting entirely of overstock from Saks Fifth Avenue and Bonwit Teller. Sales were reportedly so high above projections that an adjacent 35,000 square foot space was temporarily leased in March 1978 to accommodate the customers and merchandise. After attracting enough interest in Memphis to expand, Stein Mart's second Tennessee location opened in Nashville on September 5, 1979.

The chain would quickly grow well beyond its previous bounds in the 1980s. The chain branched into Kentucky in 1980, with a store in Louisville opening on September 9. Alabama's first Stein Mart opened in September 1982 in Mobile, and Florida's opened in Jacksonville in the fall of 1983, around the same time their corporate headquarters were moved there. The first Oklahoma store opened in a former Safeway in Tulsa on September 4, 1985, with Kansas' opening six days later in Overland Park. Virginia's first store, announced in October 1985, opened exactly a year after Kansas' on September 10, 1986, as an early tenant of the Olde Towne Shopping Center in Richmond. The chain entered Texas and North Carolina in 1988, with the opening of the Crossroads Mall store in San Antonio on March 2, and at The Pavilion on Spring Forest in Raleigh on August 26. South Carolina's first store opened in Greenville on February 28, 1989.

Under Jay Stein's leadership, Stein Mart grew from three stores in 1978 to 40 stores in 1990, and then to 123 stores by the end of 1996. In determining the prime locations for new Stein Mart stores, management targeted cities with populations of 125,000 or more and relied on demographic research regarding income, education, and occupation to help predict whether a community might support a discounter of designer merchandise. By the 2000s, the company had expanded as far west as California and as far north as Michigan.

In 2003, Stein Mart introduced the "Real Shopper" campaign with support from Orlando-based advertising agency, Fry Hammond Barr. This multimedia advertising campaign features real Stein Mart shoppers chosen via casting calls held throughout the country. Each season six to eight female shoppers are chosen to appear in the campaign and are featured in Stein Mart's Sisterhood book online.

In 2013, the company reported a profit of $25.6 million (~$33.9 million in 2024) with operation of 260 stores in 29 states.

In October 2017, in response to the downward trend of the company's stock price, the company announced plans to improve its financials by cutting 10% of their corporate staff, trimming inventory by 15%, slashing $22 million (~$27.6 million in 2024) from the prior year's capital expenses, and suspending the 4th quarter stock dividend.

In January 2018, Stein Mart announced that it would explore strategic alternatives for the company. In February 2020, Stein Mart entered into a deal to make the company private; its common stock would no longer be listed on any public stock market. The transaction is subject to approval by Stein Mart shareholders and was "expected to close in the first half of calendar year 2020."

== Bankruptcy ==
In August 2020, Stein Mart filed for Chapter 11 bankruptcy protection due to the company being largely affected by the COVID-19 pandemic, and announced that it would permanently shutter all 279 of its remaining stores by the end of October 2020. During the bankruptcy process, it also announced that all of its assets were for sale, and it was looking for a buyer to purchase those assets.

During the fall of 2020, an agreement had been reached with the private equity firm Retail Ecommerce Ventures to acquire the Stein Mart operations. In March 2023, Retail Ecommerce Ventures announced that it would be exploring options in effort to save themselves, including a potential Chapter 11 bankruptcy filing, which would mark Stein Mart's second bankruptcy in 3 years. They have also hired restructuring lawyers in effort to stave off bankruptcy.

== Brick-and-mortar operations ==
Stein Mart sold clothes for women and men as well as home décor, accessories, and shoes. Each store had about 30 employees.

Stein Mart expanded their home department in 2010, adding houseware and décor for the house. The "Boutique" portion of the store offered women special occasion clothing. The "Attitudes" section of the store carried clothing for women.

For decades Stein Mart leased its shoe department to other retailers, such as DSW Shoe Warehouse. In 2010, Stein Mart started working with Perfumania in 2010 to stock an assortment of fragrances.

In October 2010, due to popular demand by Stein Mart shoppers, the retailer began offering limited online shopping with Ship from Store for shorter delivery times.
