= Cherryland Center =

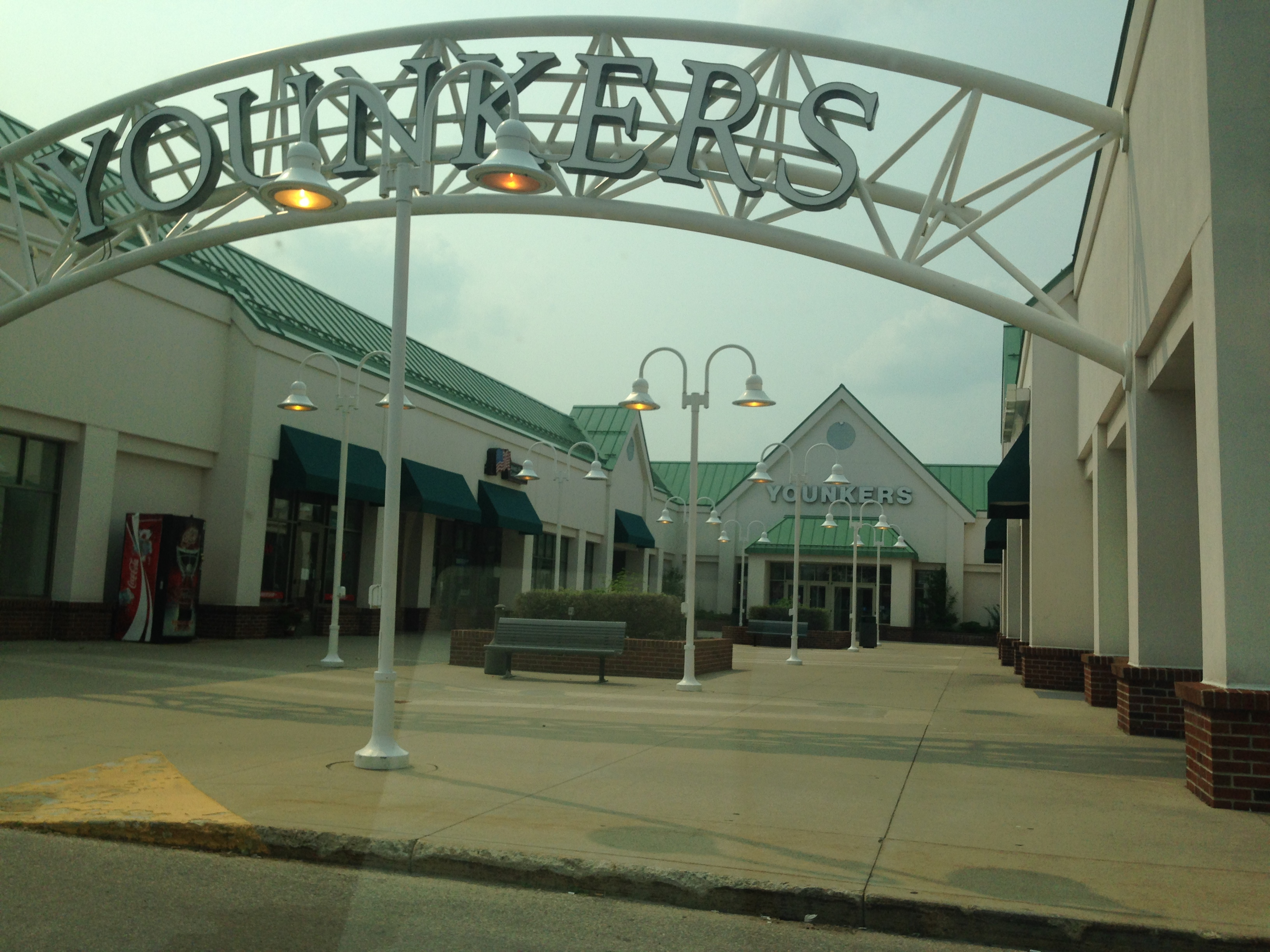
- Entrance to the outdoor promenade
- Location: Traverse City, Michigan
- Coordinates: 44.735°N 85.598°W
- Address: 1150 W. South Airport Rd.
- Opened: 1976; 50 years ago
- Previous names: Cherryland Mall
- Developer: Schostak Brothers
- Owner: McKinley, Inc.
- Num. of stores: 30+
- Num. of anchor tenants: 4 (2 open, 1 under construction, 1 vacant)
- Floor area: 167,505 square feet
- Floors: 1
- Public transit: BATA

Cherryland Center, formerly known as Cherryland Mall, is a shopping center located in Garfield Township near Traverse City in the U.S. state of Michigan. Opened in 1976, the site served as the only enclosed shopping mall in Northwest Michigan until 1992, when the nearby Grand Traverse Mall opened. In 1999, the property was redeveloped as an outdoor shopping center. A number of anchor tenants closing in the 2010s led to the property being deemed a "dead mall", despite retaining a high occupancy rate.

== History ==
In April 1976, the first tenants for Cherryland Mall were confirmed: a Kmart discount store, a Kroger supermarket, and a branch of Michigan National Bank. Kmart opened in November 1976, followed by Kroger in December. The same month, H. C. Prange Co. (now Younkers) and Sears had been confirmed as the other anchors. The Sears store replaced a catalog merchant located in downtown Traverse City. By late 1977, the rest of the mall was opened. Peripheral development the same year included two smaller strip malls and a Zantigo fast food restaurant.

In 1998, plans were announced to demolish the interior mall portion while leaving all four anchors intact. Under these plans, the Sears and Younkers stores would also be expanded. As part of this renovation, Sears expanded its store into the western third of the mall in 1999. When renovation was complete, the center was converted to an outdoor mall. The mall was foreclosed on by Wells Fargo in 2010; also, Tom's Food Market, which had taken over the supermarket space in 1986, closed. In June 2011, the space became Big Lots.

On June 6, 2017, Sears Holdings announced that Kmart would be closing as part of a plan to close 72 stores nationwide. The store closed in September 2017.

On April 18, 2018, it was announced that Younkers would also be closing as parent company, The Bon-Ton, was going out of business. The store closed in August 2018.

On May 31, 2018, Sears Holdings announced that Sears would be closing as well in September 2018, as part of another plan to close 72 stores nationwide. The closures of both Younkers and Sears left Big Lots as the only anchor. In 2020, a new Wendy's opened in an outlot of the Cherryland Center.

On June 8, 2022, TC Curling Club announced they had closed on a $7 million deal to acquire the old Kmart building. In the fall of 2022, TC Curling Club changed its name to TC Curling Center, which will be the second anchor store, along with Big Lots. In June 2022, Biggby Coffee began construction on a drive-thru only location in the Cherryland Center parking lot. In July 2022, it was announced that Arkansas-based chain 7 Brew Coffee was planning their first Michigan locations, both in Garfield Township. 7 Brew purchased their property at the Cherryland Center in November 2022. 7 Brew Coffee will replace the vacant Hometown Pharmacy location in between Big Lots and the new Biggby Coffee.

In August 2022, TC Curling Center opened to members for board meetings and tours of the new facility. It opened for full use in January 2023. In December 2022, it was announced go-kart company K1 Speed would be transforming the empty Sears location. The owner of the new facility plans to use the front portion for the racing facility with hopes to bring a Sky Zone trampoline park to the back portion of the building. Biggby Coffee opened on December 6, 2022.

In January 2023, it was announced Starbucks was going into an outlot of the Cherryland Center, along with additional retail space Construction began in late 2023.

In August 2023, it was announced the Traverse Symphony Orchestra would be opening a community music school in the remaining former KMart space. The facility will offer a 4,800-square-foot rehearsal hall and recital venue, teaching studios, office and conference rooms, green rooms, lobby, and box office.

K1 Speed and Starbucks opened in September 2024 at the Cherryland Center. In October 2024, Traverse Symphony Orchestra opened as Traverse City Philharmonic.
