= Illinois Star Centre =

Defunct shopping mall in Marion, Illinois

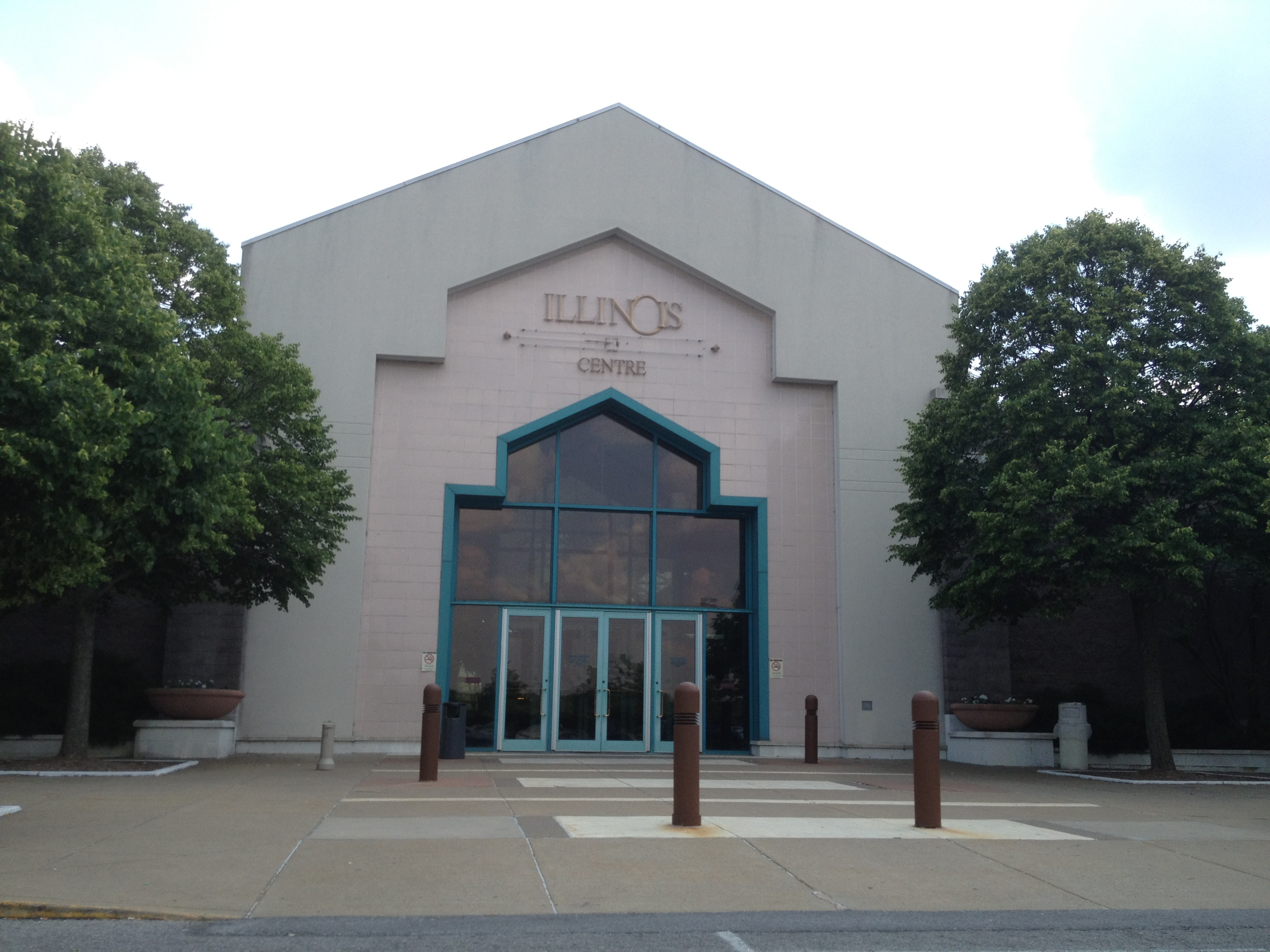
- Entrance to Illinois Centre Mall, May 2012
- Location: Marion, Illinois, United States
- Coordinates: 37.74850°N 88.97652°W
- Address: 3000 W. DeYoung St.
- Opened: 1991
- Closed: 2018
- Developer: Edward J. DeBartolo Corporation
- Owner: Roc Enterprises, LLC
- Num. of stores: 29
- Num. of anchor tenants: 3 (2 open, 1 vacant)
- Floor area: 600,000 sq ft (56,000 m^{2})
- Floors: 1
- Public transit: RMTD

Illinois Star Centre, formerly Illinois Centre Mall, was a shopping mall in Marion, Illinois, United States. Opened in 1991, it used to feature more than 60 stores. Its anchor stores include Dillard's and Target, with Target being the busiest. Previously there was a Sears anchor store, however it was closed in April 2018. Many of the mall's tenant stores have closed, with not a single vendor remaining in the food court.

== History ==
At the time the Illinois Centre Mall was being built, nearby Carbondale, Illinois already had a shopping mall, the University Mall. Because of its proximity, retail analysts predicted that competition between the two cities' retail sectors would "get pretty cut-throat". Edward J. DeBartolo Corporation developed the mall, whose initial anchor stores were Dillard's, Target, Phar-Mor and Sears, which relocated from University Mall. Illinois Centre Mall opened in 1990, resulting in the closure of the Sears at University Mall. University Mall sued Illinois Centre Mall's developers over the use of a state financing program to relocate the store, although the suit was later dismissed.

Sears and Phar-Mor opened for business in July 1991, followed by Dillard's and the mall itself in September, and Target in October. Phar-Mor closed in 1993. It later became a Blue Cross Blue Shield Association office and then a radio-controlled car racing center in 2004. DeBartolo sold the mall to local developers in 1996. Despite attracting other businesses to the area, the mall struggled with occupancy for most of its history, although new owners boosted it to 60% occupancy by 2000.

Red Lobster opened in the surrounding area on July 6, 1992. An eight-screen Kerasotes movie theater then opened next to the mall on December 1, 1993. It would be later sold to AMC Theatres.

In March 2002, an O'Charley's restaurant officially opened in the parking lot. The Home Depot opened west of Sears later that year on November 6, 2002.

On September 20, 2006, Walmart Supercenter opened outside the mall east of Dillard's.

Sabre ISC acquired the mall in 2011 via purchase of delinquent tax certificates and renamed it Illinois Star Centre. In March 2015, the Southern Illinoisan reported that three of the mall's owners were imprisoned on various counts, and that leasing agents were unresponsive on inquiries about the mall, which has become increasingly vacant and lacking in maintenance. Also complicating the mall's future is the fact that the parking lot and anchor stores are owned by different companies than the mall itself. The taxes were then purchased from the county trustee by Roc Enterprises, LLC. On May 4, 2017 the mall's ownership team declared bankruptcy after previously offering the property at auction but failing to attract a buyer.

On January 4, 2018, it was announced that Sears would be closing as part of a plan to close 103 stores nationwide. The store closed in April 2018. On January 13, 2018 it was announced that Joe's Records would be closing its mall location by January 31, 2018 in order to move to a more visible location at 1301 Enterprise Way in Marion. The Star Centre GameStop closed in April 2018.

On November 16, 2018, it was reported that the Illinois Centre Mall would cease operations after 30 days. However, anchor stores Target and Dillard's remained open.

In 2020, the mall was purchased by Marion Center Project LLC, with plans to redevelop the mall.

In 2025, the Marion City Council approved $150 million in STAR bonds for a project called Oasis Outdoors, which included redeveloping the Illinois Star Centre Mall.
