= Kokomo City-Line Trolley =

Bus service in Indiana, United States

City-Line Trolley
- Kokomo City-Line Trolley Station
- Parent: City Line Public Transportation
- Founded: 2010
- Headquarters: 209 South Union Street
- Locale: Kokomo, Indiana
- Service area: Kokomo and Indian Heights, Indiana neighborhood
- Service type: Bus
- Routes: 5
- Stops: nearly 300
- Hubs: Downtown Transit Center, 219 E Sycamore
- Stations: 1
- Fleet: 4
- Daily ridership: 1,381 a day in 2025
- Website: City Line Trolley

Kokomo City-Line Trolley, also simply known as "The trolley", is a free fixed transportation route serving the city of Kokomo, Indiana, in Howard County.

== History ==
The city of Kokomo rolled out the buses in late 2010 which was the first bus system Kokomo had seen since the late 1960s. It started with just two smaller sized buses, and just two routes, the Red Line, and the Blue Line. The two routes crisscrossed town north and south (Red Line), and east and west (Blue Line), and were both free. From 2010 to 2013 that is how it remained with only 118 bus stops. In mid-2013 the city rolled out two more buses and three more routes, with the Green Line, Orange Line, and Yellow Line being added to the two lines before. The previous Red Line was also altered in its route in 2013. The two new buses were much larger than the previous buses, and has an electronic reader on the front stating the line the bus runs. Ridership continued to be free for the riders, the buses were also all equipped with free wifi during this upgrade as well, and continued to run from 6:30 am to 6 pm. After the 2013 expansion the ridership increased in 2014 to around 2,000 riders daily.

== Routes ==
There are now five routes running through Kokomo. The Red Line goes south from the Downtown transit point and goes down Apperson Way making its way to Indian Heights where it circles the neighborhood on Council Ring Boulevard. The red line goes by Garden Square apartments, Terrace Towers, Maple Creast plaza on Washington Street, Marsh, Howard County BMV, and Indian Heights neighborhood. Then there is the Blue Line which goes from the Walmart area in the east to the K-Mart area in the west stopping at the transit center among other things in between. Its main attractions are Walmart, Planet Fitness, Meijers, Sam's Club, Hobby Lobby, the Markland Mall, Kroger, and K-Mart among other things along the way. Then there is the Green Line, and the Yellow Line which is run by the same bus and has a very similar path, the difference is the Yellow Line travels more central north picking up trailer courts, and apartment buildings, and then the Green Line travels more north and then east picking up for Ivy Tech College, Save-A-Lot, and Dollar General area up on Morgan Street. Then, finally, there is the Orange Line. Like the Red Line it also runs south, except south via Webster street, and ends up going west on some parts. Picks up for Kokomo High School, and doctor offices along Dixon Road. Some routes have transfer points with each other as well as the Downtown transfer point. The Orange, and Red lines transfer in front of Krogers at the Maple Creast plaza, and then the Blue and Red lines transfer on the corner of Apperson Way, and Markland Avenue at the national guard armory for the red line, then just a couple blocks down the Blue Line stops at Jay Street and Markland Avenue by the Marathon there.

=== Route List ===
- Red Line
- Orange Line
- Green Line
- Yellow Line
- Blue Line

== Buses ==
Both bus types are in two different forms of a trolley. The original two buses are wooden decked out on the inside, and has wooden benches all facing classroom style. The newer buses have some seats up against the wall, new standing places along the seats, and an easier cord to pull to tell the driver when to stop. Both buses have bike racks, and wheelchair ramps equipped on them. The newer buses are said to be in San Francisco trolley style.

== Downtown Transit Center ==
The downtown transit center, located at 219 East Sycamore Street, was opened on December 3, 2018. Previously, the transfer center was located at 209 South Union Street.

== Fixed route ridership ==
The ridership statistics shown here are of fixed route services only and do not include demand response services.

== See also ==
- List of bus transit systems in the United States
- Marion Transit System
