= Marion Transit System =

Provider of mass transportation in Grant County, Indiana

- Headquarters: 520 E. 6th St.
- Locale: Marion, Indiana
- Service area: Grant County, Indiana
- Service type: Bus service, paratransit
- Routes: 5
- Stations: Bus Terminal, 202 S. Adams St.
- Annual ridership: 257,760 (2019)
- Website: Marion Transit System

Marion Transit System (MTS) is the primary provider of mass transportation in Marion, Indiana, with five routes serving the region. As of 2019, the system provided 257,760 rides over 14,708 annual vehicle revenue hours with 5 buses and 1 paratransit vehicle.

Public transit in Marion began with horsecars in 1889, with the Marion Street Railway Co. In 1893, the horsecars were replaced with streetcars, which in turn were replaced by buses in 1947. In 2021, a mural was painted on a building across from the bus terminal, depicting an interurban that formerly provided transit service in the city. From 2020 through 2022, bus schedules were limited due to the COVID-19 pandemic and later staffing shortages.

== Service ==
Marion Transit System operates five weekday bus routes on a pulse system with all routes serving the downtown bus terminal on the hour. Hours of operation for the system are Monday through Friday from 7:00 A.M. to 5:00 P.M. There is no service on Saturdays and Sundays. Buses are fare-free.

=== Routes ===
- Central Marion / Ivy Tech
- General Motors / Northeast
- IWU / North Marion
- Southeast / West Point
- West Marion / VA Hospital

== Fixed route ridership ==
The ridership statistics shown here are of fixed route services only and do not include demand response services.

== See also ==
- List of bus transit systems in the United States
- Kokomo City-Line Trolley
