= K's Merchandise Mart =

Former catalog showroom retail chain

K's Merchandise
- Type: Corporation (privately held)
- Industry: Retail
- Founded: 1957; 69 years ago Decatur, Illinois, U.S.
- Founder: Kay and Raymond "Ray" Eldridge Sr.
- Defunct: January 2007; 19 years ago
- Fate: Liquidated
- Headquarters: Decatur, Illinois, U.S.
- Number of locations: 17 stores (at closing)
- Area served: Illinois, Indiana, Iowa, Missouri, Kentucky
- Key people: Bill Weinstein (last president)
- Services: Catalog merchant
- Owner: family owned (until 2000s); Gordon Brothers Group
- Divisions: Bargains Only

K's Merchandise Mart, Inc. (usually known as simply K's Merchandise) was a catalog showroom department store based in Decatur, Illinois. It offered furniture, jewelry, and general merchandise, including electronics, at 17 locations in 5 Midwestern states at the time of its closing.

K's was founded in 1957 by Raymond "Ray" Eldridge Sr. and his son Kay. However, by the 2000s, competition from big box stores had eroded K's sales for years, though it had 17 locations in Illinois, Indiana, Iowa, Missouri, and Kentucky. Boston's Gordon Brothers Group took over the company from the original family, appointing Bill Weinstein as president. After an attempt at turning around the stores' operations, K's announced on October 3, 2006, that it would liquidate and close to pay off its creditors in full.

K's Merchandise also operated four chain stores by the name of Bargains Only, with locations in Mt Zion, Champaign, Springfield and Peoria, Illinois. These stores closely resembled a TJ Maxx style offering, with clothing, household goods and furniture. They closed in front of their parent stores, with the final store closing in October 2006 in MT. Zion Illinois.
