= Bay Area Transportation Authority =

Transit agency

Overview
- Locale: Grand Traverse County; Leelanau County, Michigan, U.S.
- Transit type: Bus
- Annual ridership: 532,000 (2018)
- Website: bata.net

Operation
- Began operation: 1985

Bay Area Transit Authority (BATA; /beɪ.tə/ BAY-tə) a public transit agency that serves Grand Traverse and Leelanau counties in the US state of Michigan.

== History ==
BATA was formed February 1, 1985, out of the former Leelanau County transit combined with the Dial-A-Ride service in Traverse City, Michigan. Over the years BATA has changed routes and branding their reputation to riders with technology improvements on buses. BATA launched their Bayline service on June 25, 2018. This is the first high-frequency, east-west connection for the region, with buses every 20 minutes, 7 am – 10 pm, and it is fare-free.

== Services ==
- City & village links (door to door service)
- City loops
- Village loops
- Bayline
- Indian Trails (Hall St. transfer station)
- Benzie Bus (Hall St. transfer station)
- KAT Bus(Route 14 Turtle Creek Casino bus stop)
- WEX Express(Route 1,5 and 12 Grand Traverse Mall Stop)

== Routes ==
City loops
Route	Inbound	Outbound
1	Downtown Transfer Station	GT Mall Entrance
2	Downtown Transfer Station	LaFranier Transfer Station
5	LaFranier Transfer Station	Oak Terrace/Garfield Rd/NMC
7	Meijer/GT Mall/GT Crossing	Goodwill Inn/LaFranier Transfer
Bayline	Meijer/Downtown TC	Woodland Creek / Hotel District

Village loops
Route	Inbound	Outbound
10	Downtown Transfer Station/Traverse City	Suttons Bay
11	Downtown Transfer Station/Traverse City	Maple City & Glen Arbor
12	Downtown Transfer Station/Traverse City	Chums Corner/Interlochen
13	Downtown Transfer Station/Traverse City	Kingsley
14	Downtown Transfer Station/Traverse City	Cherry Capital Airport/Williamsburg
