= Dunham's Sports =

American sporting goods retailing corporation

- Formerly: Dunham's Bait & Tackle (1937–1953)
- Type: Private
- Industry: Retail
- Founded: 1937 (89 years ago) in West Bloomfield, Michigan
- Founder: Ron Dunham
- Headquarters: Troy, Michigan, U.S.
- Number of locations: >260 stores (2026)
- Area served: Midwest, Mid-Atlantic, Southeast, Southwest and Western United States
- Key people: Jeffrey G Lynn (CEO) David Lynn (President)
- Products: sports equipment, Apparel, footwear, exercise equipment, firearms, ammunition, camping equipment, boats
- Revenue: US $1B
- Owner: Dunham's Athleisure Corporation
- Number of employees: 6,000 (2026)
- Website: Official website

Dunham's Sports is an American sporting goods retail chain owned by Dunham's Athleisure Corporation, with stores located in the Mid-Atlantic, Midwestern, Souteastern, Southwest and Western United States. The chain specializes in athletic equipment, apparel, footwear, outdoor sports including camping, boating, hunting and fishing. Dunham's is known for carrying a large assortment of name brand products at low prices. The chain has over 260 locations in 26 states, including Alabama, Arkansas, Georgia, Illinois, Indiana, Iowa, Kansas, Kentucky, Maryland, Michigan, Minnesota, Missouri, Montana, Nebraska, New Mexico, North Carolina, North Dakota, Ohio, Oklahoma, Pennsylvania, South Dakota, Tennessee, Virginia, West Virginia, Wisconsin and Wyoming.

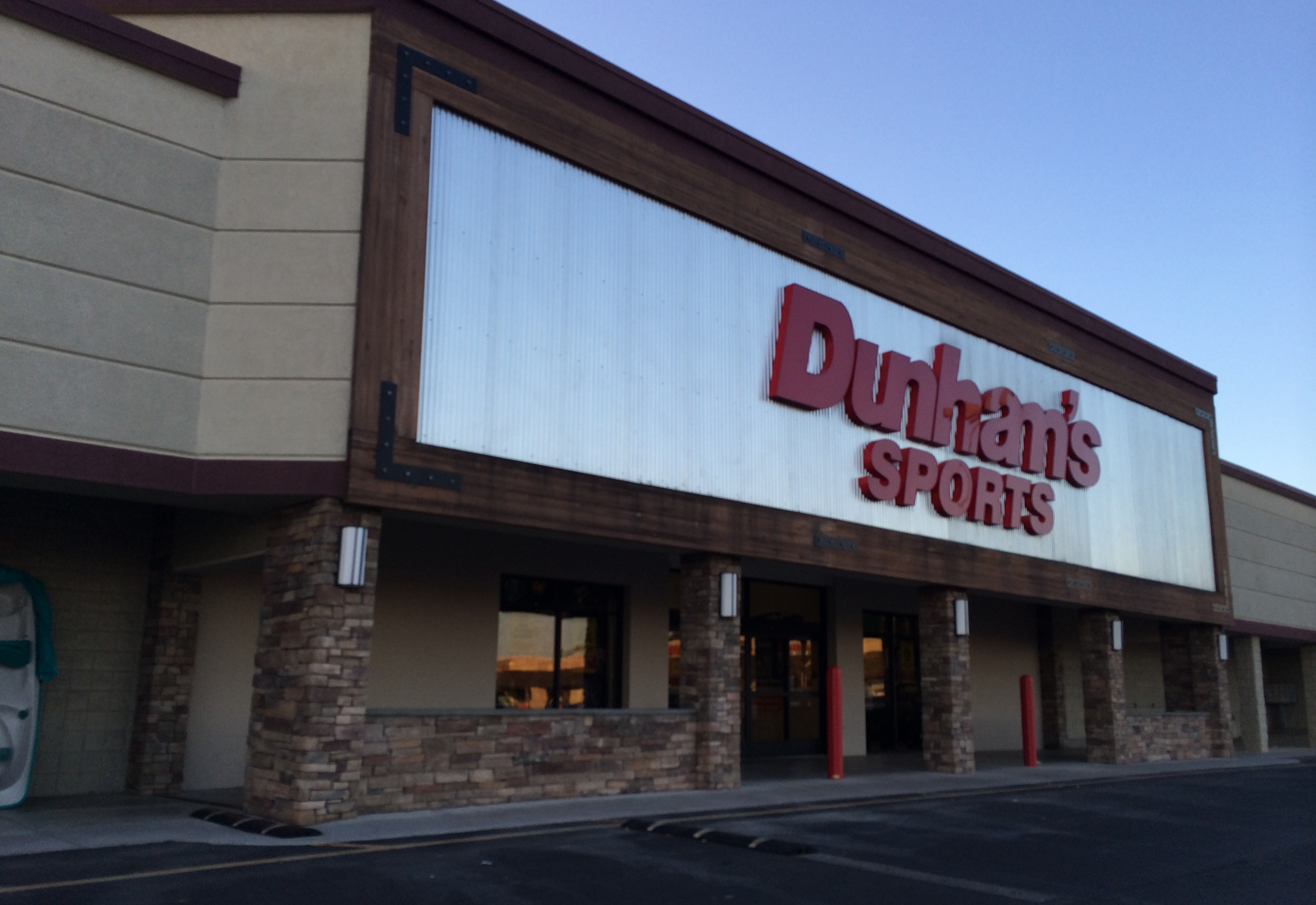
Dunham's store in Athens, Tennessee

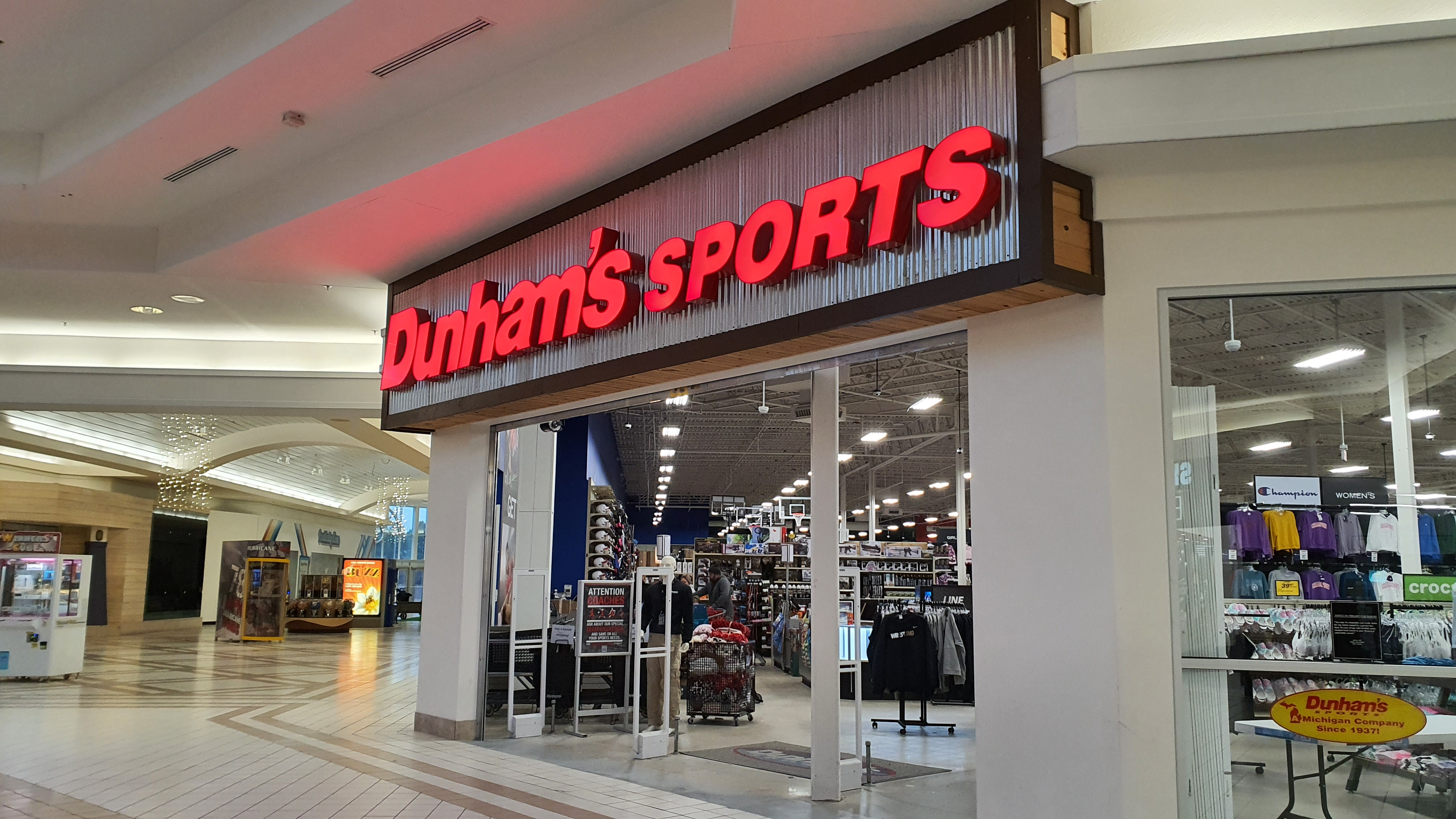
Dunham's location at the Grand Traverse Mall in Traverse City, Michigan

== History ==
The first store opened in West Bloomfield Township, Michigan in 1937 as Dunham's Bait & Tackle. It was operated by Ron Dunham on Northwestern Highway west of Telegraph Road. The original store gained exposure through advertisements in Newsweek and fishing shows hosted on radio. The original store burnt down in 1946 but was promptly rebuilt.

Robert L Schmalzried bought the store in 1953 and relocated it to the corner of Northwestern Highway and Orchard Lake Road. American Can Company acquired the chain in 1985. At the time of the acquisition, the chain had eight stores: five in Metro Detroit, one in Grand Rapids, Michigan, one in Anderson, Indiana, and one in Muncie, Indiana. After merging with Primerica, the company sold off Dunham's in 1989. By 1991, the company had 49 stores and was headquartered in Waterford Township, Michigan. Dunham's Sports is currently headquartered in Troy, Michigan.
