= Meis (department store) =

American department store

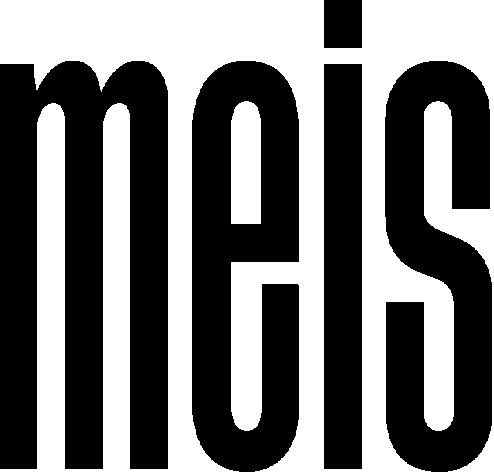
- Company type: Private
- Industry: Retail
- Founded: 1928; 97 years ago in Terre Haute, Indiana
- Founders: Lucien Meis and Salo Levite
- Defunct: 1989; 36 years ago
- Fate: Acquired by Elder-Beerman
- Successor: Elder-Beerman
- Headquarters: Terre Haute, Indiana, United States
- Area served: Indiana, Illinois and Kentucky
- Products: Clothing

Meis, also known as Meis of Illiana, was a department store based in Terre Haute, Indiana, United States. Existing from 1928 to 1989, the chain operated 11 stores at its peak. In 1989, the chain sold most of its locations to Elder-Beerman.

== History ==
Lucien Meis and Salo Levite founded the Meis department store in downtown Terre Haute, Indiana, in 1928. This store remained open until the early 1980s. Meis also operated other stores in Terre Haute at Honey Creek Mall, Plaza North, and The Meadows. The chain also operated a jeans store called The Bottom Half. Both of these businesses were sold to Brown Shoe Company (now Caleres) in 1972.

Stores also operated in Anderson, Kokomo, Marion, and Elkhart, Indiana; Carbondale, Danville, and Mattoon, Illinois; and Paducah, Kentucky.

Brown Group sold the Meis chain, then consisting of ten stores, to Elder-Beerman in 1989.

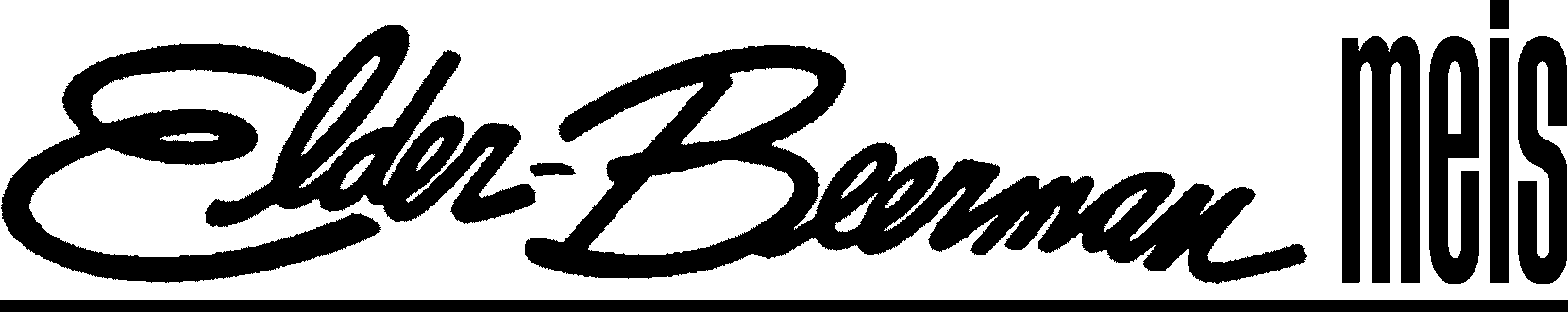
Elder Beerman-Meis transition logo
