= Elder-Beerman =

Defunct American chain of department stores

- Formerly: Boston Dry Goods (1883-1896); Elder & Johnson Company (1896-1962)
- Type: Subsidiary
- Industry: Retail
- Founded: 1883 (143 years ago) as Boston Dry Goods in Dayton, Ohio
- Founders: Arthur Beerman; Thomas Elder; William Hunter Jr. Russell Johnston
- Defunct: August 29, 2018 (8 years ago) (original company)
- Fate: Chapter 7 Bankruptcy Liquidation
- Headquarters: Dayton, Ohio, United States
- Number of locations: 69 (at peak); 31 (at closing)
- Products: Clothing, footwear, bedding, furniture, jewelry, beauty products, and housewares.
- Parent: The Bon-Ton (2003–2018); CSC Generation (2018-2021; BrandX.com (2021-Present)
- Website: elder-beerman.com

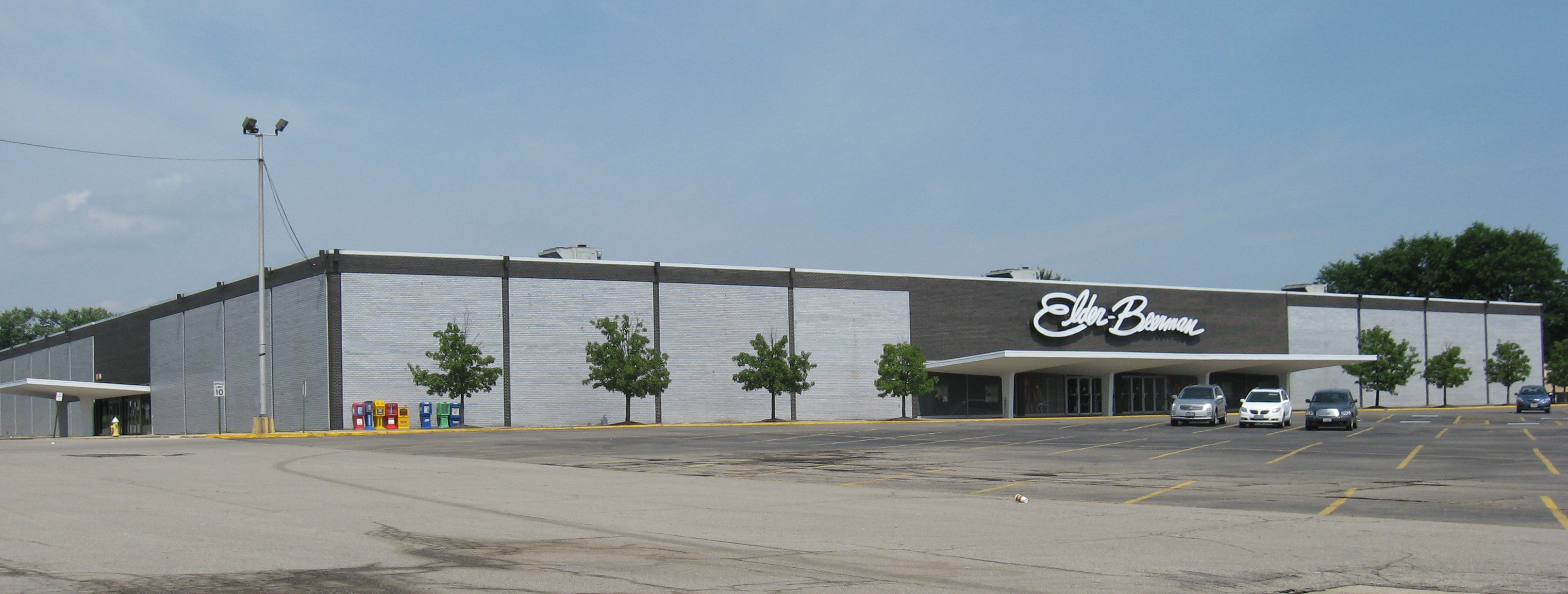
Elder-Beerman store in Centerville, Ohio, as shown in 2006 prior to closure. Demolished in 2011 for a Kroger Marketplace.

Elder-Beerman was an American chain of department stores founded in 1883 and whose last stores closed in 2018. The chain, based primarily in the Midwestern United States, was composed of 31 stores in eight states at the time of its liquidation in 2018, and peaked around 2003 with 68 stores and $670 million in annual sales.

== History ==
In 1883, Elder-Beerman history began when the Boston Dry Goods Store was opened on East Third Street in downtown Dayton, Ohio by Thomas Elder, William Hunter, Jr. and Russell Johnston, selling textiles, clothing and groceries. In 1896, the store moved to a new 11-story skyscraper, the Reibold Building, at the corner of Fourth and Main streets; it operated there as the Elder & Johnston Company department store for over 60 years. For most of its later history, its headquarters was located at 3155 El-Bee Road, Moraine, Ohio and from 1976 to 2015 it operated a flagship 6-floor location in Downtown Dayton, located at Courthouse Plaza, 40 N. Ludlow St., Dayton.

=== Beerman and Gutmann ===
In 1930, after a short career with Elder & Johnston, Arthur Beerman, founder of the Elder-Beerman Stores Corp., branched out on his own and by 1945, Beerman Stores was incorporated. In 1950, he opened "Beermans for Bargains" junior department stores in the McCook Shopping Center in north Dayton and in the Northtown Shopping Center just north of Dayton in Harrison Township, Montgomery County.

In 1953, Beerman formed a partnership with Max Gutmann and together they established the Bee Gee Shoe Corporation, which later operated stores branded as El-Bee Shoe Outlets and Shoebilee! for many years. They also operated Margo's specialty clothing stores.

Former Elder-Beerman logo used until 2006

In 1956, Beerman purchased the Home Store, a department store in downtown Dayton. Throughout the 1950s, Beerman and Gutmann expanded Beerman Stores throughout Dayton's suburbs; in 1961, Gutmann became executive vice president and general manager of the chain.

In 1962, Beerman Stores merged with the Elder & Johnston Company to form Elder-Beerman; at this time, the Elder & Johnston Company's Reibold Building location was closed in favor of the Home Store location. In the 1960s and 1970s, the Elder-Beerman Stores Corp. expanded throughout western Ohio and surrounding states, including standalone furniture stores, competing with its Dayton-based rival, Rike's (now Macy's).

=== After Beerman ===
After Beerman's death in 1970, Gutmann was promoted to chairman and chief executive officer. In 1976, the downtown Dayton store was relocated to a new building on Courthouse Square, which had five stories, including the basement. In 1978, Elder-Beerman expanded into the Cincinnati area, purchasing Mabley & Carew's four stores, one in downtown Cincinnati and three in its suburbs.

In 1985, Herb Glaser was named president and CEO of the department store division. With Herb Glaser as president, Gutmann and Glaser developed the Elder-Beerman franchise through the 1980s and early 1990s. When the company was forced to file for Chapter 11 reorganization in 1995, Max Gutmann and Herb Glaser returned from retirement to turn the company around. During the bankruptcy, Frederick J. Mershad asked to replace Gutmann as chairman and chief executive officer. As a result of the bankruptcy, Elder-Beerman closed all of their Margo's LaMode stores in early 1996.

Elder-Beerman acquired three chains throughout its history: Cincinnati-based Mabley & Carew in 1978; Terre Haute, Indiana-based Meis in 1989; and Wheeling, West Virginia-based Stone & Thomas in 1998.

=== 1999 and 2003 prototypes ===
In late 1999, Elder-Beerman opened prototype stores in Jasper, Indiana; Warsaw, Indiana; and Frankfort, Kentucky. These stores included service centers, open-stock cosmetic and shoe departments, and courtesy telephones. Four years later, the chain opened smaller-scale prototypes in DeKalb, Illinois and Muscatine, Iowa, the latter being their first Iowa location. These stores represented a new marketing strategy of operating smaller-format stores in mid-sized markets.

=== The Bon-Ton and liquidation ===
Elder-Beerman was acquired by The Bon-Ton in 2003. At that point, Elder-Beerman was the ninth largest independent department store chain, and had exited bankruptcy and was in discussions to go private when Bon-Ton stepped in, offering more cash for outstanding stock. Elder-Beerman's brand was kept active on its 68 stores in eight states after the merger, and Elder-Beerman CEO Bud Bergren would become CEO of Bon-Ton in 2004.

In 2012, The Bon-Ton began re-branding several Elder-Beerman stores to some of its other nameplates. Several in Michigan and Indiana were converted to Carson's or Younkers. This re-branding reduced the number of Elder-Beerman stores to 37, primarily in Ohio.

In March 2017, Elder-Beerman opened in-store "Close to Home" shops selling locally made and themed products, an initiative being rolled out throughout Bon-Ton's nameplates, in its Dayton Mall, The Mall at Fairfield Commons, Huber Heights and Kettering stores in the Dayton area. In April 2017, a "Close to Home" shop was opened at the Eclipse Center store in Beloit, Wisconsin.

On April 17, 2018, The Bon-Ton Stores, Inc., as a part of its own Chapter 11 bankruptcy, was purchased by a joint venture composed of the holders of the company's 8.0% Second Lien Secured Notes due 2021 and Great American Group, LLC and Tiger Capital Group, LLC., with the intention of liquidating The Bon-Ton and its subsidiaries, including Elder-Beerman, which had operated for 135 years.

In the Dayton area, the Elder-Beerman stores in Kettering and in the Miami Valley Centre Mall in Piqua closed on August 26, 2018. All remaining Elder-Beerman stores in the chain, as well as all other Bon-Ton-owned department stores, closed on August 29, 2018.

=== CSC Generation ===
On August 31, 2018, Elder-Beerman's website, along with all other Bon-Ton-owned retail websites, were updated with "stay tuned" messages, indicating that the company's respective brands would come back in some form; the liquidator stated that the company's intellectual property was being sold.

In the following week, it was reported on September 6 that CSC Generation agreed to purchase Bon-Ton's customer database as well as its trademarks and websites. While the retailer would become a smaller, more agile e-commerce business that focused on its website, there were plans to reopen some physical stores in Colorado, Illinois, Indiana, Pennsylvania and Wisconsin.

CSC Generation relaunched websites for all of its newly purchased department store brands on September 14. In addition to apparel and home goods, the websites also sold televisions and major kitchen appliances. The websites also offered a lease-to-own program where consumers would pay a portion of the merchandise cost monthly rather than paying the entire price upfront. There were no indications at that time that any former Elder-Beerman locations would be reopened.

Attempts to relaunch physical stores for any of the former Bon Ton's brands proved to be unsuccessful. In November 2018, CSC Generation opened a Carson's store in Evergreen Park, Illinois, along with unrealized plans to open additional locations. The lone store closed two years later in October 2020. CSC Generation was unable to open a single Elder-Beerman branded store during their short period of ownership.

=== BrandX ===
BrandX quietly acquired the Elder-Beerman name and the other Bon Ton intellectual property from CSC Generation for an undisclosed price in early 2021. In May 2022, BrandX announced plans to reopen the various websites and possibly open physical stores at a later date. As of January 2025, the Elder-Beerman website remains inactive with few changes since January 2022.
