= List of shopping malls in Pennsylvania =

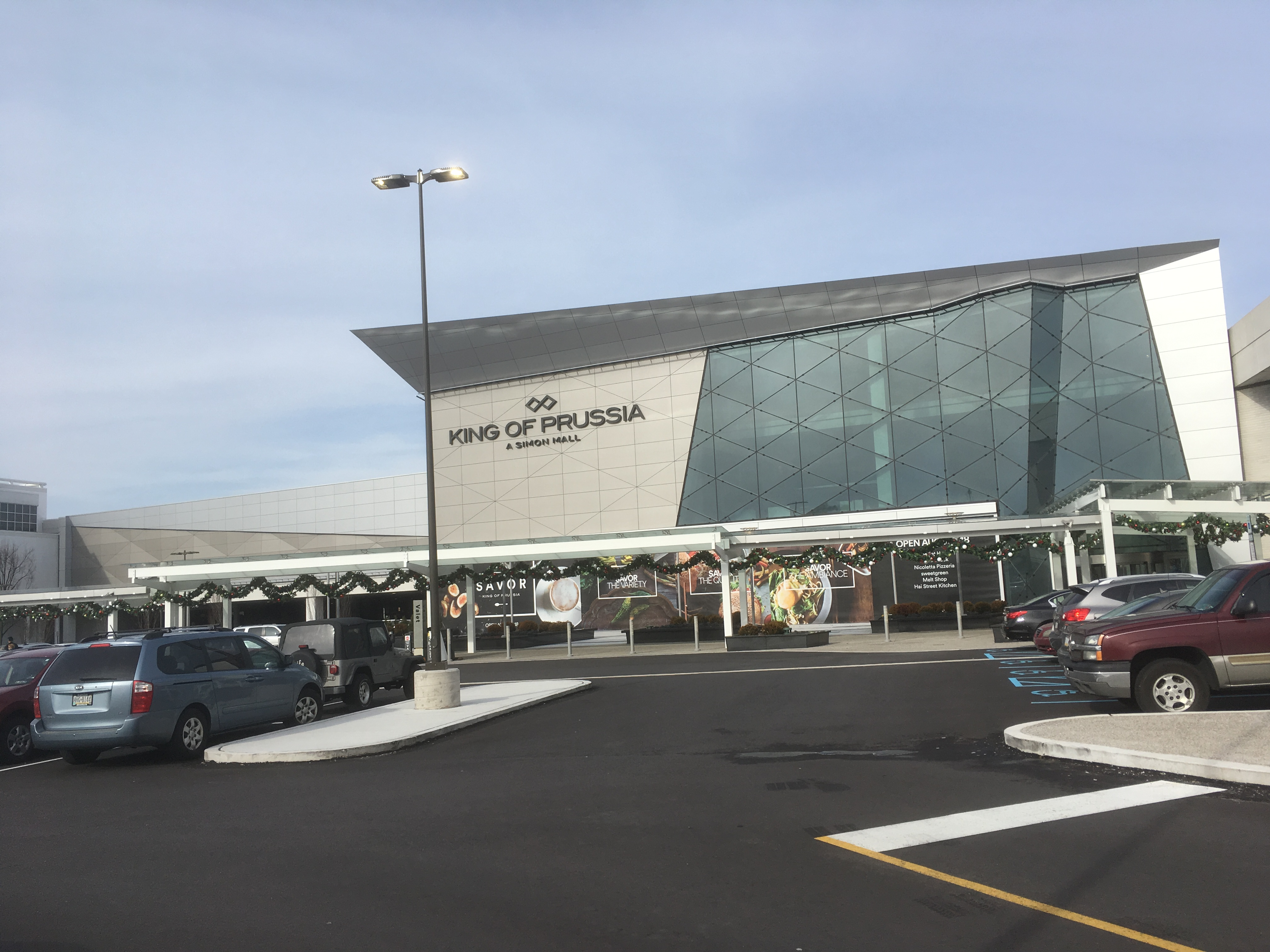
King of Prussia Mall in King of Prussia, the largest shopping mall in Pennsylvania with 425 stores and third-largest shopping mall in the United States

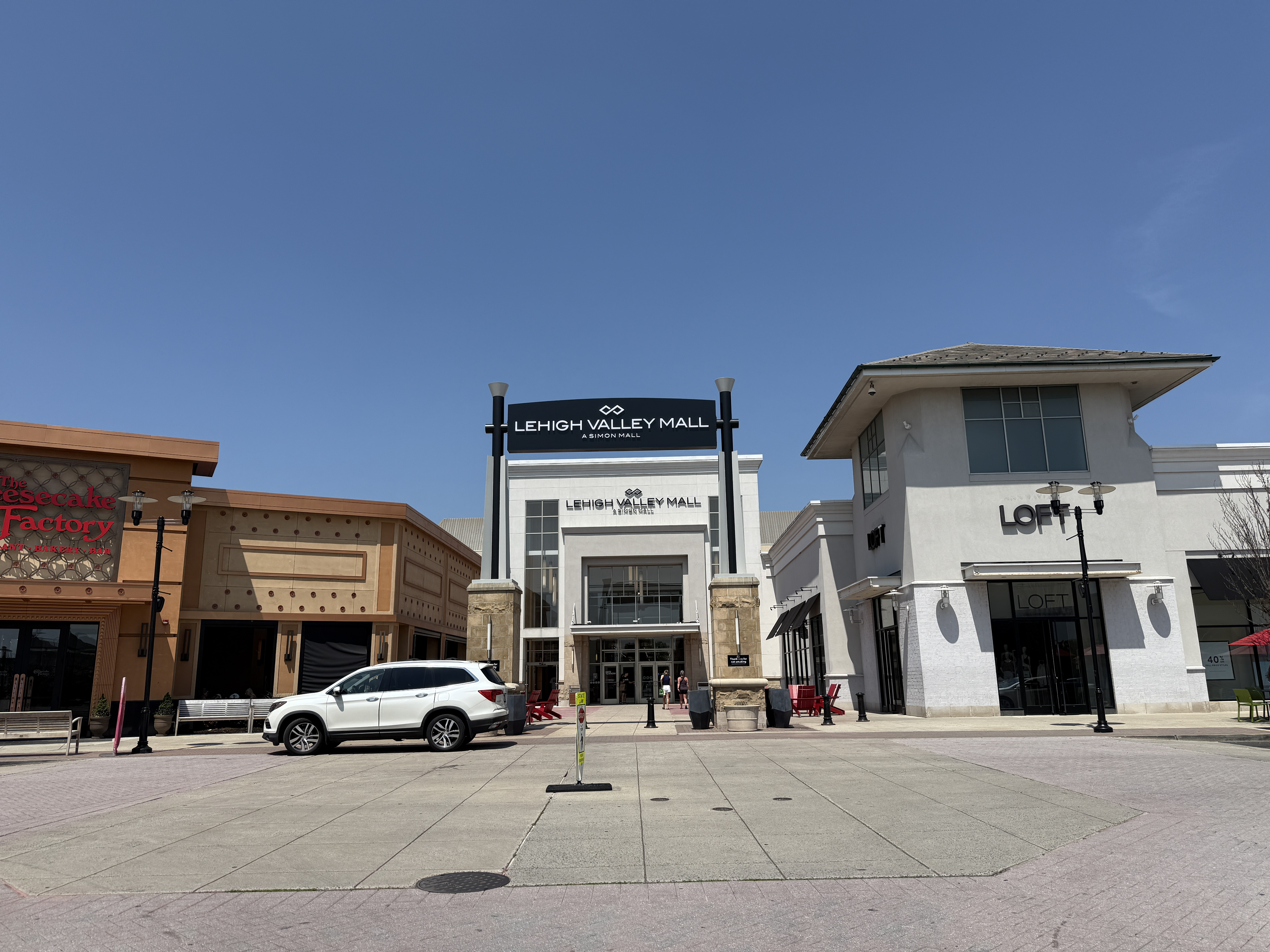
Lehigh Valley Mall in Whitehall Township

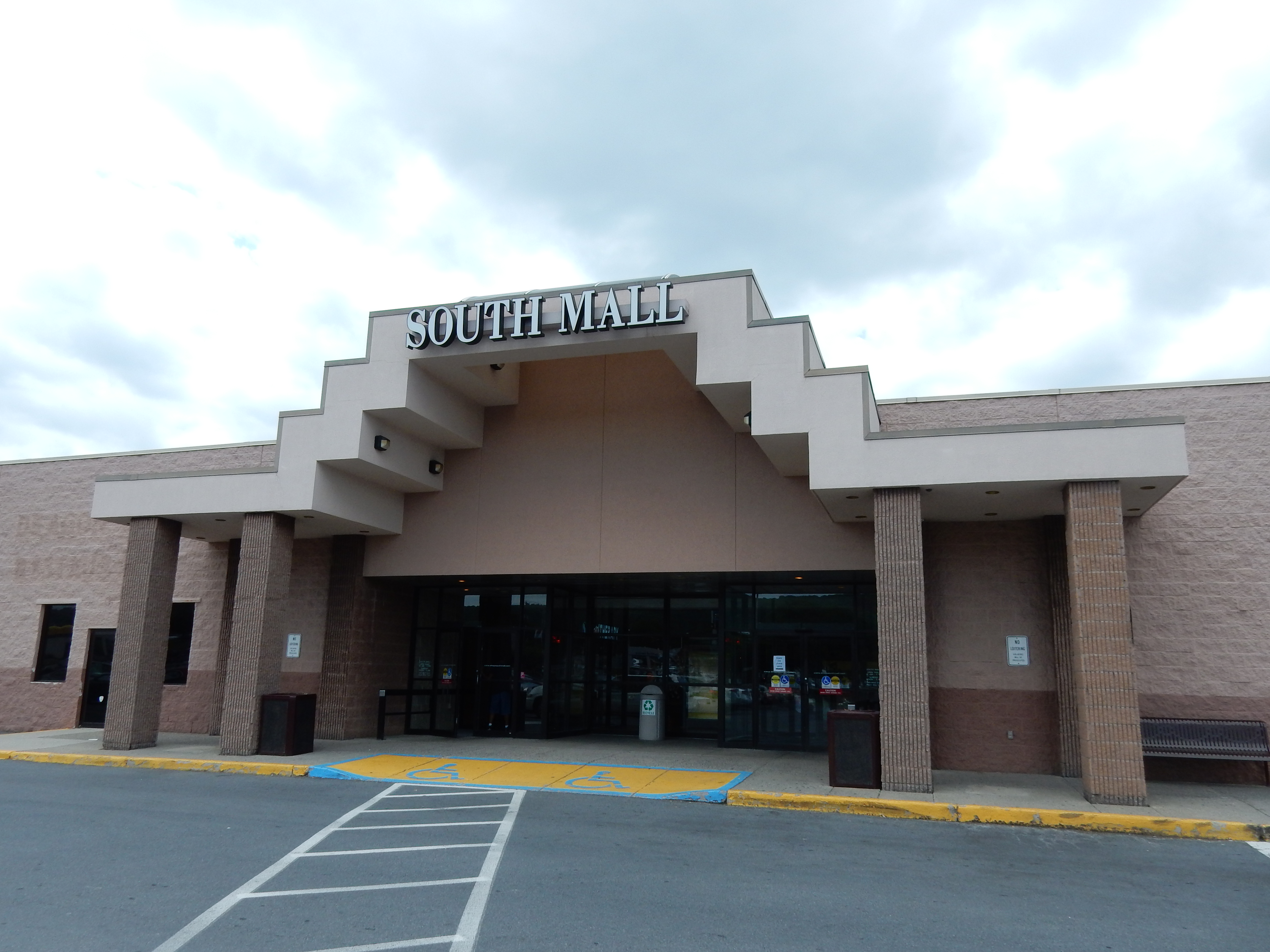
South Mall's main entrance in Salisbury Township

This is a list of shopping malls in Pennsylvania:

Name	Location	Gross Leasable Area sq ft (m^{2})	Number of Stores
Beaver Valley Mall	Monaca	1,153,000 sq ft (107,100 m^{2})	37
Berkshire Mall	Wyomissing	910,000 sq ft (84,500 m^{2})	63
Capital City Mall	Camp Hill	608,911 sq ft (56,600 m^{2})	99
Carbon Plaza Mall	Lehighton	210,000 sq ft (19,500 m^{2})	20
Cascade Galleria (formerly Towne Mall)	New Castle	228,703 sq ft (21,200 m^{2})	13
Church Hill Mall	Hazleton	150,000 sq ft (13,900 m^{2})	17
Clarion Mall	Clarion	213,783 sq ft (19,900 m^{2})	12
Clearfield Square (formerly Clearfield Mall)	Clearfield	163,679 sq ft (15,200 m^{2})	15
Clearview Mall	Butler	760,000 sq ft (70,600 m^{2})	19
Colonial Park Mall	Harrisburg	743,497 sq ft (69,100 m^{2})	22
Cranberry Mall	Cranberry Township	405,591 sq ft (37,700 m^{2})	19
Cressona Mall	Pottsville	282,211 sq ft (26,200 m^{2})	23
Downtown Mall	Meadville	170,000 sq ft (15,800 m^{2})	30
DuBois Mall	DuBois	439,793 sq ft (40,900 m^{2})	53
Fashion District Philadelphia (formerly Gallery at Market East)	Philadelphia	1,080,002 sq ft (100,300 m^{2})	68 (230+ at peak)
Fairlane Village Mall	Pottsville	405,000 sq ft (37,600 m^{2})	12
Franklin Mall (formerly Philadelphia Mills and Franklin Mills)	Philadelphia	1,600,000 sq ft (148,600 m^{2})	64
Franklin Village Mall	Kittanning	167,505 sq ft (15,600 m^{2})	17
Indiana Mall	Indiana	456,084 sq ft (42,400 m^{2})	36
Johnstown Galleria	Johnstown	894,646 sq ft (83,100 m^{2})	70
King of Prussia Mall	King of Prussia	2,900,000 sq ft (269,400 m^{2})	425
Laurel Mall	Hazleton	610,000 sq ft (56,700 m^{2})	60
Lebanon Valley Mall	Lebanon	396,810 sq ft (36,900 m^{2})	43
Lehigh Valley Mall	Fullerton	1,170,000 sq ft (108,700 m^{2})	153
Logan Valley Mall	Altoona	778,385 sq ft (72,300 m^{2})	35
Millcreek Mall	Millcreek Township	2,200,000 sq ft (204,400 m^{2})	174
Monroeville Mall	Monroeville	1,418,700 sq ft (131,800 m^{2})	74
Montgomery Mall	Montgomeryville	1,154,000 sq ft (107,200 m^{2})	47
Nittany Mall	State College	532,160 sq ft (49,400 m^{2})	26
Oxford Valley Mall	Middletown Township	1,334,000 sq ft (123,900 m^{2})	114
Palmer Park Mall	Easton	457,734 sq ft (42,500 m^{2})	45
Park City Center	Lancaster	1,443,000 sq ft (134,100 m^{2})	170
Pittsburgh Mills	Tarentum	2,100,000 sq ft (195,100 m^{2})	15
Plymouth Meeting Mall	Plymouth Meeting	952,200 sq ft (88,500 m^{2})	72
The Point at Carlisle Plaza (formerly Carlisle Plaza Mall)	Carlisle	299,859 sq ft (27,900m^{2})	
Promenade Saucon Valley	Center Valley	475,000 sq ft (44,100 m^{2})	70
Roosevelt Mall	Philadelphia	562,269 sq ft (52,200 m^{2})	47
Ross Park Mall	Pittsburgh	1,212,000 sq ft (112,600 m^{2})	155
South Hills Village	Bethel Park; Upper St. Clair	1,137,000 sq ft (105,600 m^{2})	137
South Mall	Salisbury Township	405,199 sq ft (37,600 m^{2})	42
Springfield Mall	Springfield	589,000 sq ft (54,700 m^{2})	70
Strawberry Square	Harrisburg		30
Stroud Mall	Stroudsburg	419,059 sq ft (38,900 m^{2})	41
Suburban Square	Ardmore		57
Susquehanna Valley Mall	Selinsgrove	744,900 sq ft (69,200 m^{2})	53
The Block Northway (formerly Northway Mall)	Pittsburgh	467,848 sq ft (43,500 m^{2})	29
The Mall at Robinson	Robinson Township	872,000 sq ft (81,000 m^{2})	100
The Marketplace at Steamtown (formerly Mall at Steamtown)	Scranton	563,774 sq ft (52,400 m^{2})	34
The Westgate (formerly Westgate Mall)	Bethlehem	270,000 sq ft (25,100 m^{2})	
The Shops at Liberty Place	Philadelphia	143,000 sq ft (13,300 m^{2})	33
Uniontown Mall	Uniontown	698,012 sq ft (64,800 m^{2})	22
Viewmont Mall	Scranton; Dickson City	747,194 sq ft (69,400 m^{2})	78
Washington Crown Center (formerly Franklin Mall)	Washington	676,136 sq ft (62,800 m^{2})	55
Wayne Heights Mall	Waynesboro	117,951 sq ft (11,000 m^{2})	
Westmoreland Mall	Greensburg	1,283,597 sq ft (119,300 m^{2})	134
Whitehall Plaza (formerly Whitehall Mall)	Whitehall	592,498 sq ft (55,000 m^{2})	
Willow Grove Park Mall	Willow Grove	1,203,423 sq ft (111,800 m^{2})	116
Wyoming Valley Mall	Wilkes-Barre Township	912,027 sq ft (84,700 m^{2})	52
York Galleria	York	764,514 sq ft (71,000 m^{2})	49

== Outlet malls ==
- Cranberry Mall – Cranberry Twp.
- Gettysburg Village Outlets – Gettysburg
- Grove City Premium Outlets – Grove City
- The Outlets at Wind Creek Bethlehem – Bethlehem
- Philadelphia Mills – Philadelphia
- Philadelphia Premium Outlets – Limerick
- Pocono Premium Outlets (formerly The Crossings Premium Outlets) – Tannersville
- The Shop @Rockvale – Lancaster
- Tanger Factory Outlets – Hershey
- Tanger Factory Outlets – Lancaster
- Tanger Factory Outlets – Washington
- VF Outlet Village – Reading

== Former malls ==
Original	Replacement	Location	Years in Operation	Fate
Allegheny Center Mall	Nova Place	Pittsburgh	1966 - 2017	Converted to professional/office plaza
Bradford Mall		Bradford		Converted to power center
Bucks County Mall	Bucks Crossing	Feasterville	1967 - 1996	Converted to strip mall
Butler Mall	Butler Commons	Butler		Converted to strip mall
Columbia Mall	Columbia Colonnade	Bloomsburg	1988 - 2022	Interior closed to public; under redevelopment to shopping center
Camp Hill Mall	Camp Hill Shopping Center	Camp Hill	1986 - 2003	Converted to strip mall
Cedarbrook Mall	Cedarbrook Plaza	Wyncote		Converted to strip mall
Century III Mall		West Mifflin	1979 - 2019	Under demolition; future plans unknown
Chambersburg Mall		Chambersburg	1982 - 2023	Closed to public; future plans unknown
Cheltenham Square Mall	Greenleaf at Cheltenham	Cheltenham Twp.	1981 - 2015	Converted to strip mall
Coventry Mall; Norco Mall	The Shoppes at Coventry	Pottstown	1967 - 2023	Converted to strip mall/self storage/fitness center
Delco Plaza Mall	Delco Plaza	York		Converted to strip mall
East Hills Shopping Center		Pittsburgh	1960 - 2001	Demolished
East Towne Mall	East Towne Centre	Lancaster		Converted to power center
Eastland Mall		North Versailles	August 15, 1963 - February 15, 2005	Demolished and later replaced by a warehouse
Erie Central Mall	Northgate Commons	Erie	1961 - 1994	Converted to medical center
Exton Square Mall	Exton Town Centre (proposed)	Exton	March 15, 1973 – June 30, 2026	Interior closed to public; redevelopment remains stalled
Fairgrounds Square Mall		Reading	Oct 1980 - April 30, 2018	Interior demolished; site awaiting future redevelopment
Granite Run Mall	Promenade at Granite Run	Media	1974 - July 1, 2015	Redeveloped for mixed use
Greengate Mall	Greengate Centre	Greensburg	1965 - 2001	Redeveloped as a power center
Harborcreek Mall		Erie	1974 - 1997	Demolished
Harrisburg Mall; Harrisburg East Mall	Swatara Exchange	Harrisburg	1969 - 2024	Demolished; mixed use redevelopment proposed
Highlands Mall		Natrona Heights	1977 - 2006	Replaced by a Walmart Supercenter
Home Furnishings Factory Outlet		Morgantown	1985 - 2011	Partially used for vehicle storage
Kennywood Mall	Kennywood Shops	West Mifflin		Converted to strip mall
Laurel Mall (Laurel Plaza)		Connelsville		Used as an flea market with Rural King anchor. Redevelopment plans exist
Lebanon Plaza Mall	Lebanon Plaza	Lebanon		Converted to power center
Leo Mall		Philadelphia		Replaced by The Home Depot
Lycoming Mall	The District at Lycoming Valley	Pennsdale	1978 - 2023	Interior closed to public; mixed use redevelopment proposed
MacDade Mall		Holmes	1969 - 2014	Converted to strip mall
Manufacturers Outlet Mall		Morgantown	1985 - 2011	Former Outlet Mall in Morgantown, Pennsylvania.
Merchants Square Mall; Allentown Outlet Mall	Merchants Commerce Center	Allentown	19?? - 2023	Under demolition; plans exist for future warehouse on site.
Meadville Mall	Vernon Place	Meadville	1976 - 2008	Demolished
MJ Mall	Carlisle Commons Shopping Center	Carlisle		Redeveloped as a power center
Neshaminy Mall		Bensalem	1968 - 2026	To be redeveloped into a mixed-use center
North Hanover Mall		Hanover	1967 - 2025	Condemned
North Hills Village		Pittsburgh	1976 - 2005	Converted to strip mall
North Mall	The CrossRoads	York		Converted to strip mall
Parkway Center Mall		Pittsburgh	November 4, 1982 - 2013	Demolished
Regency Mall		Indiana	1969 - 2010	Converted to strip mall
Richland Mall	Richland Plaza	Quakertown	1976 - 1997	Converted to power center
Richland Mall	Richland Town Center	Johnstown	1974 - 1998	Redeveloped as a power center
Schuylkill Mall		Frackville	October 9, 1980 - January 15, 2018	Demolished and later replaced by a warehouse
Shenango Valley Mall	Hickory Fields	Hermitage	March 13, 1968 - May 31, 2024	Demolished, to be replaced by power center
Shop-A-Rama	Levittown Town Center	Levittown		Redeveloped as a power center
Station Mall	Station Medical Center	Altoona	1977 - 2010	Converted to medical center
The Shoppes at Trexler		Trexlertown	1973 - 2002	Converted to strip mall
Valley Forge Mall	Shoppes at Valley Forge	Phoenixville	1975 - 2003	Converted to strip mall
Valley Green Mall		Etters		
Village Mall		Horsham		Converted to strip mall
Village Square Mall		Bethel Park		Converted to power center
Washington Crown Center	Franklin Crossroads Park	Washington	1969 - 2026	Converted to power center
Washington Mall		Washington	1968 - 2014	Under demolition, to be replaced by Costco
Warren Mall		Warren	1979 - 2018	Redeveloped into shopping center
West Manchester Mall	West Manchester Town Center	York	1981 - 2014	Converted to power center
West Side Mall		Edwardsville	1960 - 2005	Redeveloped as a strip mall
Woodhaven Mall		Bensalem	1972 - 1994	Converted to strip mall
York Mall		York		Converted to power center
