= Oakridge Mall (disambiguation) =

Oakridge Mall is a shopping center in San Jose, California, United States.

Oakridge Mall may also refer to:

- Oakridge Centre, a shopping center in Vancouver, British Columbia, Canada
- Main Street Oak Ridge, a shopping center on the former site of Oak Ridge Mall, Oak Ridge, Tennessee, United States
