= Valley Mall (Hagerstown) =

Coordinates: 39°37′14″N 77°46′28.2″W

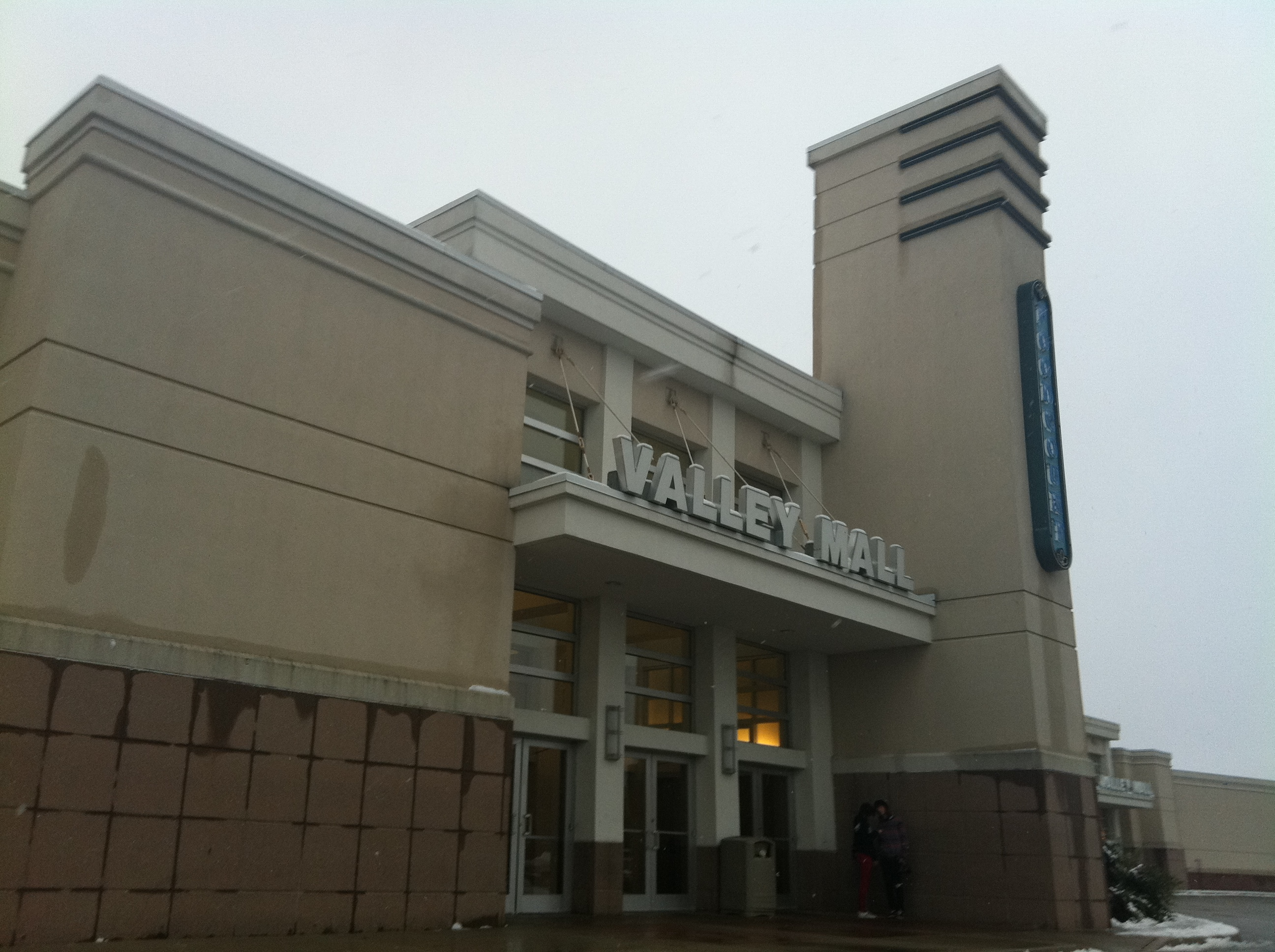
- Entrance to Valley Mall, October 2011
- Location: Halfway, Maryland
- Opened: August 15, 1974; 52 years ago
- Renovated: 1995, 2012
- Developer: Shopco Development Company
- Manager: PREIT
- Owner: PREIT
- Num. of stores: 100+
- Num. of anchor tenants: 6
- Floor area: 917,060 square feet (85,000 m^{2})
- Floors: 1 (2 in JCPenney)
- Parking: 5000
- Public transit: WCT bus: 111, 112, 113, 113A, 441
- Website: shopthevalleymall.com

Valley Mall is a super-regional shopping mall serving Hagerstown, Western Maryland and nearby communities in West Virginia and Pennsylvania. Valley Mall is the only indoor mall in the Hagerstown Metropolitan Area since the closure of Martinsburg Mall, the other. Anchor stores include Belk, Dick's Sporting Goods, JCPenney, Onelife Fitness, Meritus Urgent Care, and Tilt Studio.

== History ==
=== 1974–2006: Founding, opening, new wing, and second floor ===
Valley Mall was developed by Shopco Development Company of New York City, on 81 acres (330,000 m^{2}) of land owned by Western Maryland Railway. The mall took two years to construct and it officially opened its doors on August 15, 1974. It was considered to be the second mall to open in Western Maryland and the Tri-State Area (the first being its then-sister mall Frederick Towne Mall in Frederick, Maryland, which opened in 1972). The mall opened with 49 stores (with a planned 94 stores for that October). Anchors were JCPenney, Montgomery Ward, Eyerly's (later The Bon-Ton), Peoples Drug, and Carmike Cinemas 3. Montgomery Wards opened on April 17, 1974. Eyerly's opened on July 31 the same year at 10 a.m. EDT. Both moved from downtown Hagerstown to Valley Mall. In November 1975, a partial second floor opened with mostly small crafts stores.

On November 30, 1995, the mall completed a $4 million renovation which included landscaping, better lighting, benches, live plants and redone entrances. The second floor (and its accompanied elevator) was removed and replaced with a fountain. On November 11, 1995, McCrory's was announced to close. On November 19, 1997, Crown American bought Valley Mall. On April 28, 1998, the mall was announced to expand 116,000 square feet (10,800 m^{2}) with a new wing to include a 120,000-square-foot (11,000 m^{2}) Hecht's department store, a 16-screen Regal Cinemas multiplex, and additional small stores. This was completed the next year. In 2003, Sears moved from Long Meadow shopping center in northern Hagerstown to replace Montgomery Ward, which closed in March 2001. In 2006, Hecht's became Macy's as part of the retirement of the Hecht's nameplate.

=== 2012–Present: Further expansion and anchor changes ===
In 2012, the mall underwent a 2,300-square-foot (210 m^{2}) expansion with two restaurants alongside exterior renovations on the north side of the mall. This continued in 2013 with the addition of Red Robin. In January 2016, Macy's was announced to close alongside 35 other stores. On June 22, 2017, it was announced that Sears would be closing in September of that year as part of a plan to close 20 stores nationwide. On July 22, 2017, it was announced that Bon-Ton would be closing in February 2018 as its lease expires, which left JCPenney as the only anchor left.

On October 17, 2018, Belk opened up in the former space of Bon-Ton as the second anchor store in Valley Mall since the closure of Bon-Ton. On December 13, 2017, it was announced that the former Macy's would be replaced by Tilt Studio and Onelife Fitness. Tilt opened on September 14, 2018. Onelife Fitness opened on January 24, 2019. Dick's Sporting Goods opened in the former Sears in 2020. On January 22, 2023, Old Navy relocated from the mall to the nearby shopping center behind the mall. Meritus Urgent Care also opened at the mall on July 1, 2024.

== Gallery ==
Sears

Macy's

Regal Cinemas

JCPenney

The Bon-Ton

Former pylon

Garfields

== See also ==
- Hagerstown Outlets
- Chambersburg Mall
- Country Club Mall
