= Highlands Mall =

Shopping mall in Pennsylvania, United States

Coordinates: 40.64619°N 79.71220°W

Highlands Mall is a former shopping mall in Harrison Township, Pennsylvania that operates today as an open-air shopping center. It opened in 1977 and closed in 2006, reopening after its redevelopment in 2008.

== History ==
=== Beginnings ===
Highlands Mall came to fruition after Crown American had decided to expand its shopping center along Freeport Road in the Harrison Township village of Natrona Heights. The center, which opened in 1972, up to that point, had housed only two tenants, which were actually one and the same. Johnstown-based Gee Bee Department Stores, operated a discount department store in one half of the building, and a grocery store in the other half. Because this location was one of the regional chain's more profitable stores, the concept of the mall came in tandem with a proposed expansion of Gee Bee.

For this time period, there was no indoor shopping mall serving the Alle-Kiski Valley region. The closest malls up to this point in time were the Butler Mall in Butler, Pennsylvania; Monroeville Mall in Monroeville, Pennsylvania; Greengate Mall in Greensburg, Pennsylvania; Northway Mall in Ross Township; and Eastland Mall in North Versailles.

Gee Bee served as the mall's anchor tenant, with the mall being constructed on the north end of the shopping center, which housed the department store half of Gee Bee. The mall opened in the fall of 1977 with the following tenants: a new Gee Bee furniture store, Pearle Vision, First Federal of Pittsburgh, J&S Pizza, General Nutrition Center, National Record Mart, Waldenbooks, and Hallmark. The mall also featured a game room with coin-operated video games and pinball machines, pay toilets, a courtyard wishing well fountain, and a snack stand featuring hot pretzels.

=== Decline ===
The earliest signs of decline of Highlands Mall came with the decline of business for Gee Bee. The retailer closed its grocery business around 1985-1986 and the supermarket half of the store was replaced when Penn-Traffic opened a Bi-Lo Supermarket in this location. Because the supermarket was separately owned, a former common entrance between both the co-owned supermarket and department store was sealed.

At around this same time, Gee Bee had sold its mall furniture store business to Freight Liquidators, but as the transition in business was relatively seamless, it went unnoticed.

Towards the conclusion of the 1980s, Heights Plaza, the mall's competitor which had been operating since the 1950s, underwent a major facelift in an attempt to attract new tenants, and as an incentive, offered those already in the Highlands Mall a cheaper rate. The first tenants to pack up were National Record Mart and Radio Shack, two of the mall's more popular stores.

In 1990, Gee Bee, citing a decline from more powerful national competitors, declared Chapter 11 bankruptcy protection. The retailer successfully emerged from bankruptcy, and in May 1992, was sold to Value City. Value City operated at the Highlands Mall location until 2001, when it finally closed, citing a lack of business justifying it to stay open.

With no anchor tenant for the first time in over 30 years, other businesses at the mall continued to close, leaving the mall a shadow of its former self. Some smaller tenants rented former store space for offices, but the mall now offered very little in the way of choices for retail shoppers. Because of few cars outside the mall, it was assumed during the mall's last few years that it had been closed for some time.

=== Demolition ===
Michael Joseph Development purchased the mall property in early 2005. They announced later that year that the mall would be demolished and redeveloped, though it would still retain its original name. The new Highlands Mall features stores such as Wal-Mart, Roomful Express Furniture (the succeeding company of Freight Liquidators) and some smaller arcade style stores. Demolition began on Wednesday, February 22, 2006, and Roomful Express, the first store at the newly redeveloped site, opened in January 2008. Roomful Express closed in 2010.

As of June 2019, Freedom Square Diner, Dunham's Sports, Wines and Spirits, GameStop, The Gold Buyers of Pittsburgh, Sally Beauty, GNC, and Walmart are occupying the mall. Residing in front of the mall are a Tractor Supply, Taco Bell, O'Reilly Auto Parts, First Commonwealth Bank, and a Goodwill.

== Sources ==
- Highlands Mall still open for business - The Tribune Review
- Highlands Mall to be razed in February - The Tribune Review
- Wal-Mart plans supercenter at Highlands site - The Tribune Review
- Highlands Mall passes into history - The Tribune Review
- Shopping center rings up revitalization - The Tribune Review
