= Logan Valley Mall =

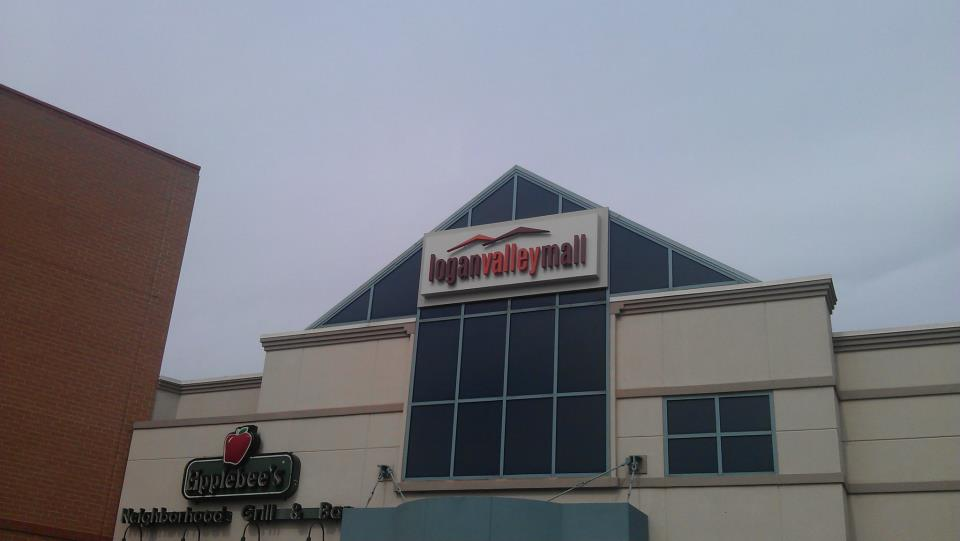
- The main entrance of the Logan Valley Mall
- Location: Altoona, Pennsylvania, United States
- Coordinates: 40.46767°N 78.41145°W
- Address: 5580 Goods Lane
- Opened: 1965
- Developer: Crown Construction
- Owner: Namdar Realty Group
- Architect: Hunter, Campbell & Rea (now Hayes Large)
- Num. of stores: 35
- Num. of anchor tenants: 4 (3 vacant, 1 open)
- Floor area: 778,385 square feet (72,000 m^{2})
- Floors: 2
- Parking: Garage and Lots
- Public transit: AMTRAN bus: 1, 4, 5, 8, 9, 11, 12; ATA bus: Clearfield to Altoona Shopping; CamTran+ bus: 36
- Website: shoploganvalleymall.com

The Logan Valley Mall is a regional shopping mall that is located in Altoona, Pennsylvania, United States. It is currently anchored by JCPenney and features 35 stores and services on two levels.

== History ==
=== 20th century ===
The Logan Valley Mall opened in November 1965 as an open-air shopping center with Sears, Weis Markets and a few small shops. JCPenney was built in 1966, and the mall was enclosed for a grand opening on June 8, 1967. In May 1976, a four-screen movie theater opened in the mall. In 1979, another expansion was completed by Crown American with the construction of Hess's department store. By the mid-1990's, the mall had offered more than one hundred stores and services.

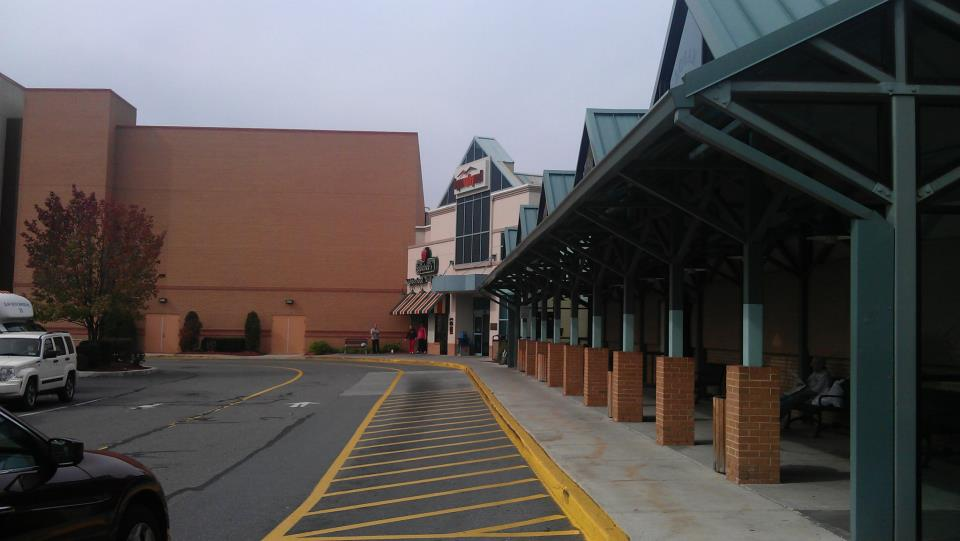
The Amtran Bus station and Mall Main Entrance

During the early morning hours of December 16, 1994, a fire of unknown origin broke out in the G.C. Murphy store and quickly spread through most of the original section of the mall, which did not have fire sprinklers. Fifteen stores and nine kiosks were destroyed and dozens more were damaged.

A three-phase plan was immediately laid out to reconstruct the mall. The first phase, beginning in 1995, started with a new store, Kaufmann's, which was added to the far end of the mall to replace the then-vacant Hess's. The already-built, undamaged, two-story portion of the mall was renovated to include changeovers, such as the re-branding of Wall To Wall Sound & Video to The Wall and temporary relocation of restaurants such as Wong's Wok. Another phase one project was the construction of a new, two-story section to replace the portion damaged by the fire. This was completed in May 1996. Phase two consisted of opening a new three-story parking garage and a new eight-screen Carmike Cinema. Phase three was completed in 1997 and included the opening of a new larger JCPenney store closer to Sears and a new food court on the renovated second floor of the old Penney's store.

=== 21st century ===
PREIT acquired the mall in 2003 as part of its acquisition of the malls owned by Crown American. The May Department Stores Company, which owned Kaufmann's, was sold to Federated Department Stores in 2005. Federated proceeded to convert various May properties to Macy's, including the Logan Valley Mall store. In 2017, the Carmike Cinema was re-branded AMC Classic following AMC's acquisition of the Carmike chain. Also in 2017, the mall was sold to Mason Asset Management and Namdar Realty Group.

On December 28, 2018, it was announced that the mall's Sears store would be closing as part of a plan to close eighty stores nationwide. The store closed on March 3, 2019.

On July 7, 2021, it was announced that the AMC CLASSIC Logan Valley 8 had closed permanently, due to the economic impact of the COVID-19 pandemic.

On January 9, 2025, it was announced that Macy's would be closing as part of a plan to close 66 stores nationwide. The store closed on March 23, 2025, leaving JCPenney as the only anchor.

In August of 2025, the Altoona Mirror reported that the Logan Valley Mall's value was recently assessed at $15 million, less than a quarter from what it was assessed for in 2018. This decline was attributed to a lack of attendance & patronage at the mall, which was worsened through its decaying infrastructure: a ceiling leaking water in the food court, a parking deck closed due to concrete falling on cars, and broken escalators making it difficult to get between the first & second floors. It was reported that several stores were trying to escape their lease as soon as May of 2026, with several store owners citing the poor condition of the mall as detrimental to attracting customers.

In June 2026, a power outage caused by a faulty transformer forced 10 of the mall's remaining stores to close for weeks. Store managers also complained to the media of mold issues, gnat and mice infestations, and contaminated water.

== See also ==
- List of shopping malls in Pennsylvania
