= Palmer Park Mall =

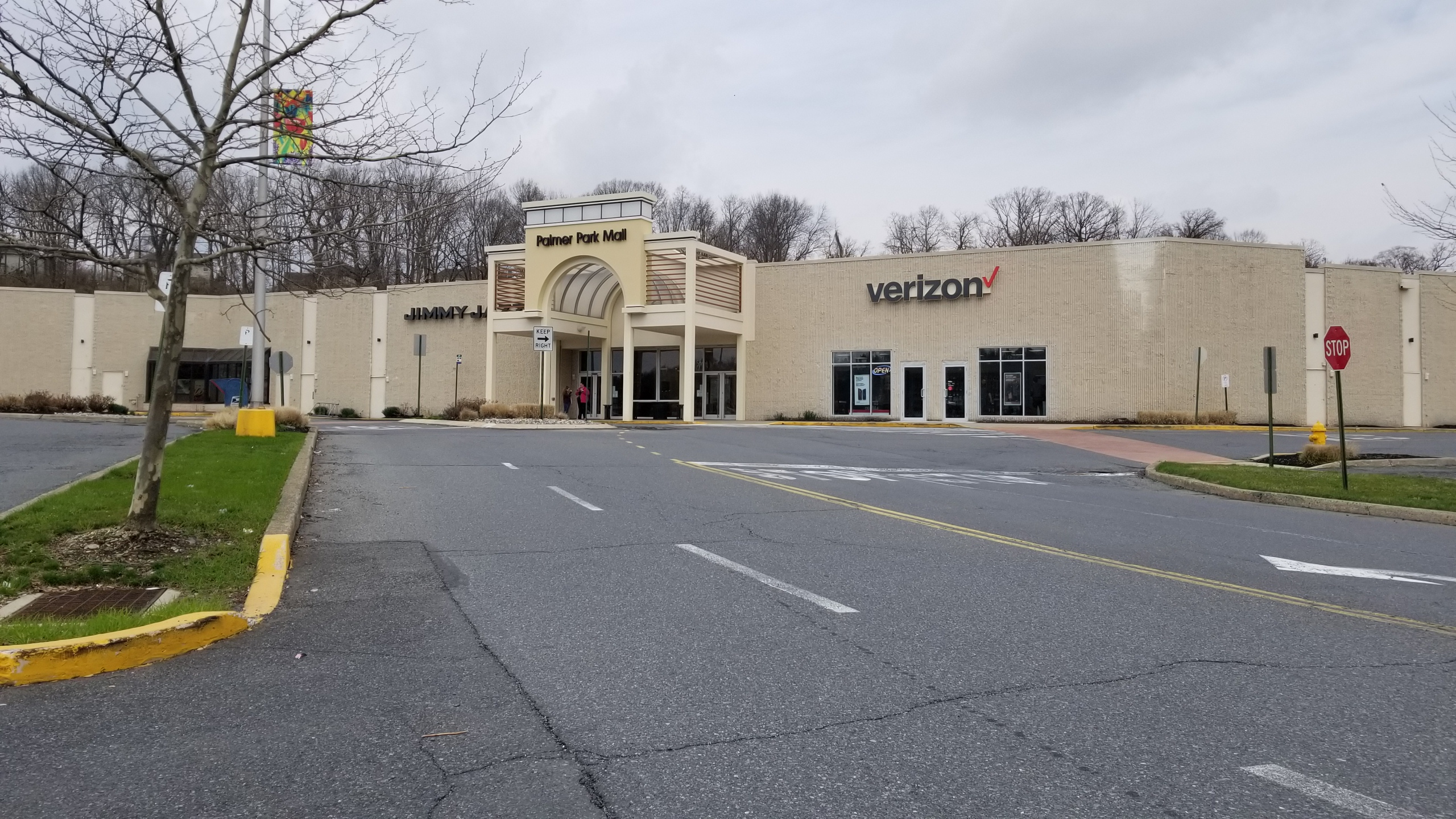
- Entrance to Palmer Park Mall in Easton, Pennsylvania in April 2019
- Location: Palmer Township, Pennsylvania, U.S.
- Coordinates: 40.6968°N 75.2581°W
- Address: 123 Palmer Park Mall; Easton, Pennsylvania, U.S.
- Opened: August 16, 1973
- Developer: Hess's
- Owner: Cityview Commercial LLC
- Num. of stores: 55
- Num. of anchor tenants: 2
- Floor area: 457,734 square feet (42,524.9 m^{2})
- Floors: 1
- Parking: Parking lot
- Public transit: LANta bus: 106
- Website: shoppalmerparkmall.com

Palmer Park Mall is an indoor one-story shopping mall of 457,734 square feet (42,524.9 m^{2}) located in the Lehigh Valley region of eastern Pennsylvania. The mall is located at the intersection of PA Route 248 (Nazareth Road) and Park Avenue in Palmer Township, Pennsylvania.

The mall has over 50 stores and is anchored by a 122,125 square foot (11,346 m^{2}) Decor Home Furniture and a 192,110 square foot (17,848 m^{2}) Boscov's. The Decor Home Furniture was previously occupied by The Bon-Ton. The shopping mall is owned by Cityview Commercial LLC.

Palmer Park Mall primarily serves as the main shopping mall for residents of the Easton area, including the townships of Bethlehem Township, Forks, Palmer, and Williams, and the boroughs of Glendon, West Easton, and Wilson.

The mall also serves as a designated metro transit center for several LANta bus routes, where riders can transfer to different routes.

== History ==
=== 20th century ===
Palmer Park Mall was first announced in October 1971 by the Hess's department store company, who claimed that they intended build a 300,000 square foot (27,871 m^{2}) mall at the site of John Raub's farm in Palmer Township, with 35-40 stores and parking for 2,000 cars. Hess's opened their department store at the site of the mall in July 1972, before the rest of the mall was constructed. Palmer Park Mall had its grand opening on August 16–18, 1973, at which point Hess's was the sole anchor.

In early 1976, less than three years after the mall's opening, Hess's announced a 15,000 square foot (1,394 m^{2}) expansion to their department store that was completed by the end of spring that same year. This brought the department store up to 122,125 square feet (11,346 m^{2}). The mall itself was expanded to 349,000 square feet (32,423 m^{2}) in 1982 to accommodate a second anchor: an 80,000 square foot (7,432 m^{2}) Clover department store, the discount division of Strawbridge & Clothier.

The mall experienced a decline in business during the 1990s, which was caused in part by the mall's aging design along with the nearby opening of the much larger and much newer Phillipsburg Mall in 1989. In 1994, the debt-ridden Hess's department store chain was sold; 19 of the remaining Hess's stores, including the location at Palmer Park Mall were sold to The Bon-Ton Stores, Inc, which rebranded the stores under its name the following year. The mall was dealt yet another blow when the Clover department store closed their doors in 1996.

The fortunes of the mall changed for the better in October 1998 with the opening of Boscov's, which took over the space of the old Clover location. The retail space was also expanded by over 100,000 square feet to accommodate Boscov's, bringing the total retail space of the mall up to its current level. The mall also received a $10 million renovation in 1999 to update the mall's aging decor, followed by an investment of over $1 million by Bon-Ton to update their department store.

=== 21st century ===
In 2003, the mall became wholly owned by PREIT after it acquired mall developer Crown American. Prior to this acquisition, the mall was owned 50% by PREIT and 50% by Crown American.

In January 2015, PREIT announced that it was planning on selling Palmer Park Mall along with four other properties. In its final quarterly report before the sale of the mall, PREIT reported that the Palmer Park Mall did $311 in sales per square foot. PREIT was seeking to achieve a portfolio average of $500 in sales per square foot by the end of 2016, prompting the sale of Palmer Park and other properties. On February 23, 2016, Cityview Commercial LLC purchased the mall from PREIT for $18 million, with plans to improve the mall.

After filing for Chapter 11 Bankruptcy Protection in February 2018, The Bon-Ton Stores, Inc. went out of business that same year; all stores closed by the end of August, including the location at the Palmer Park Mall. The mall management has speculated that the former Bon-Ton anchor could be partially demolished and retrofitted to accommodate multiple tenants as the mall searches for a productive future use for the space.

The decision to demolish the former Bon-Ton anchor was reversed when in 2022, Decor Home Furniture opened a furniture store in the anchor space.

== Anchors ==
- Boscov's (1998–) (192,110 sq ft (17,848 m^{2}))
- Decor Home Furniture (2022-)(122,125 sq ft (11,345.8 m^{2}))

=== Former anchors ===
- Hess's (1972–1994, replaced by The Bon-Ton)
- Clover (1982–1996, replaced by Boscov's)
- The Bon-Ton (1994–2018, replaced by Decor Home Furniture)
