= Chambersburg Mall =

Defunct mall in Pennsylvania, U.S.

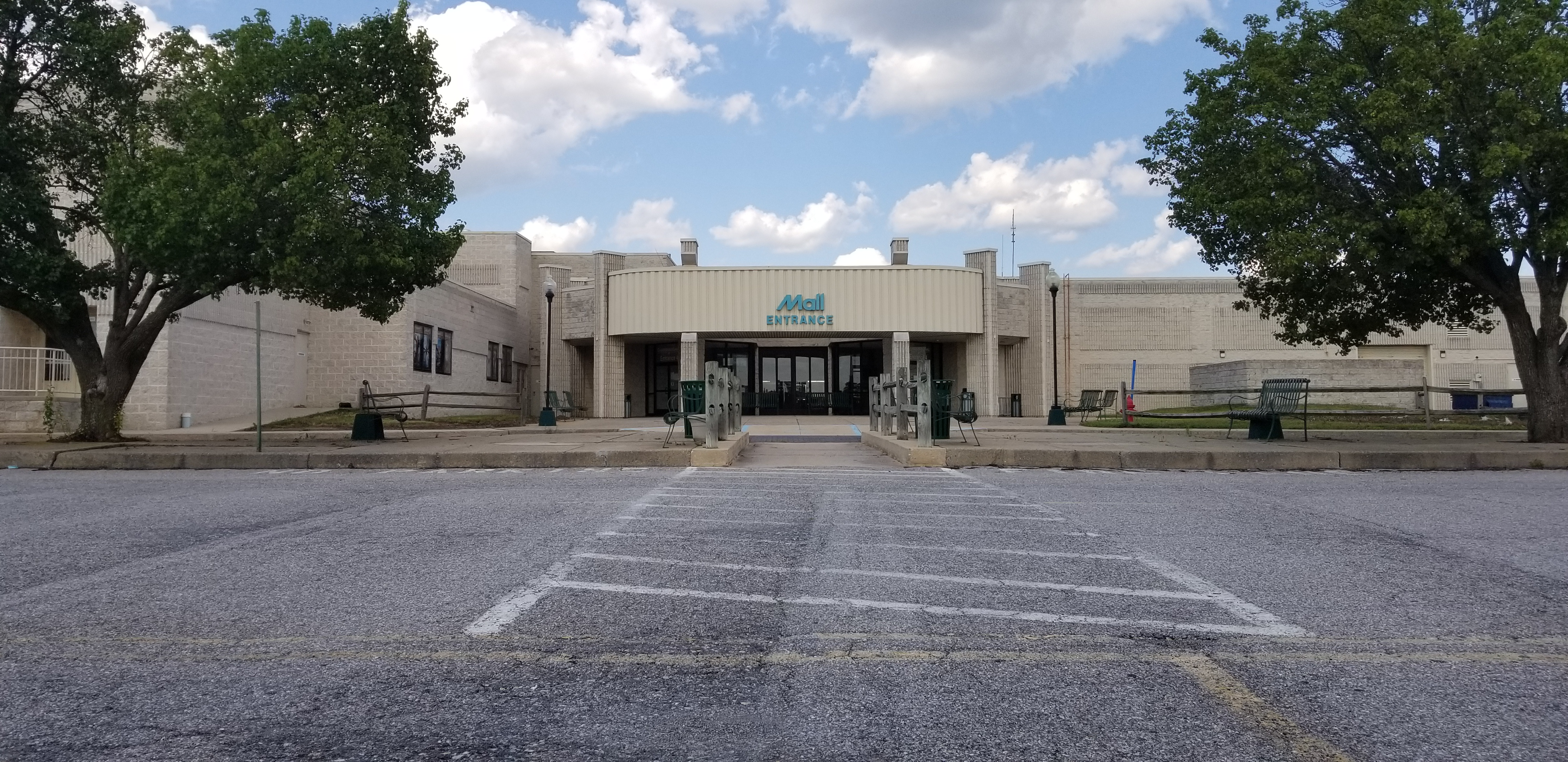
- Entrance to Chambersburg Mall
- Location: Chambersburg, Pennsylvania, United States
- Coordinates: 39.955°N 77.575°W
- Address: 3055 Black Gap Road
- Opened: March 4, 1982; 44 years ago
- Closed: June 30, 2023; 3 years ago
- Developer: Crown American
- Manager: Namdar Realty Group
- Owner: Namdar Realty Group
- Num. of stores: 0
- Num. of anchor tenants: 5 (all vacant)
- Floor area: 454,350 square feet (42,000 m^{2})
- Floors: 1
- Website: shopchambersburgmall.com

Chambersburg Mall is an abandoned mall located near Chambersburg, Pennsylvania, in the unincorporated community of Scotland. Located at exit 20 off Interstate 81, the mall had a capacity of at least 64. It is currently owned and managed by Namdar Realty Group. The mall's anchor stores and last remaining store, inaccessible from the mall interior, was Black Rose Antiques & Collectibles. There are 3 other vacant anchor stores that were once JCPenney, Burlington, and The Bon-Ton.

== History ==
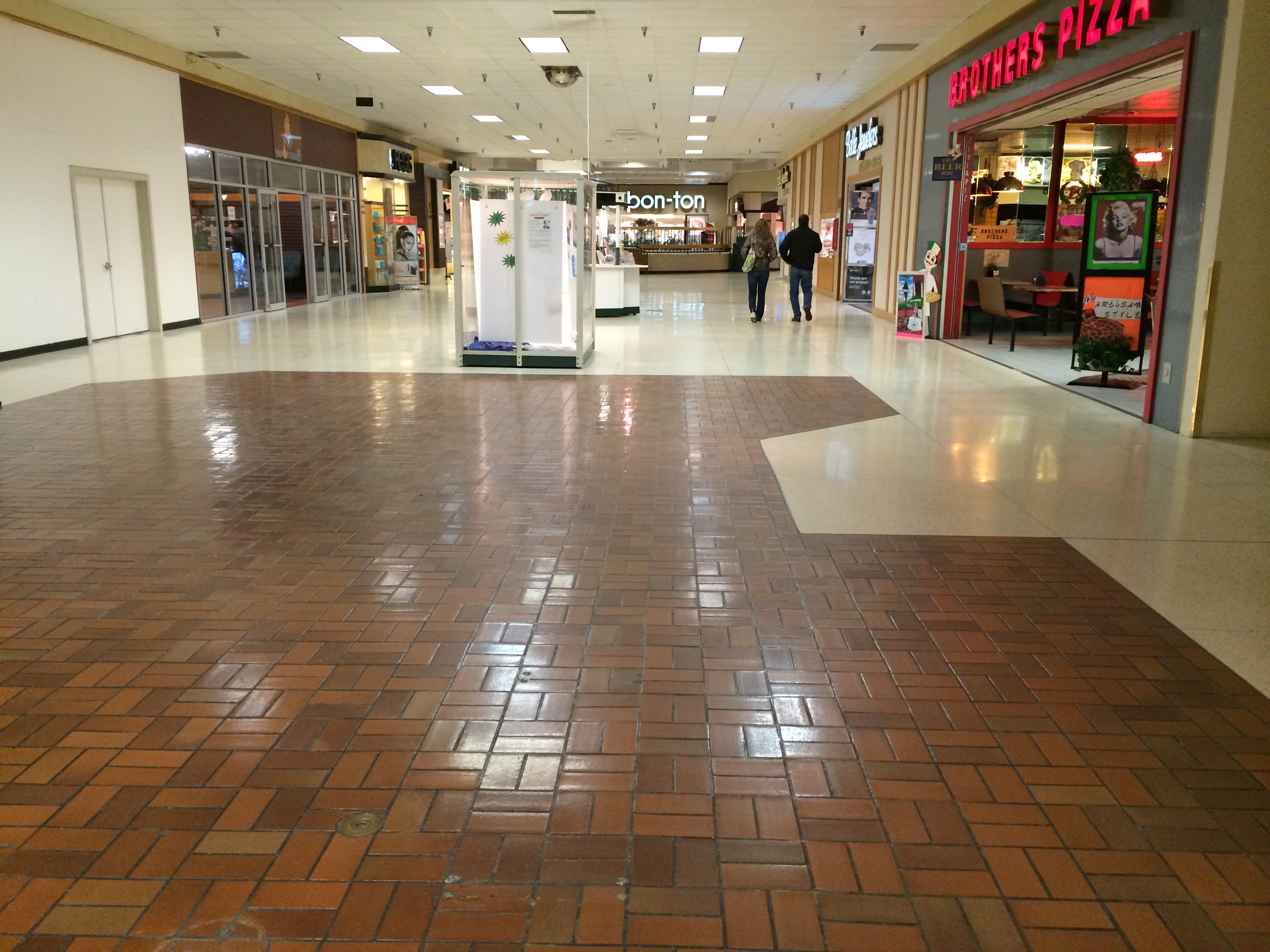
Interior view of Chambersburg Mall, February 2015

Chambersburg Mall opened March 4, 1982 under Crown American mall developers with Hess's and Gee Bee as anchors, plus a Carmike Cinemas. The Bon-Ton was added three years later in 1985. Sears joined the mall in 1990 when it moved from downtown Chambersburg. In the early 1990s, Hess's closed all of its stores and the mall's store was replaced with JCPenney, which moved from a plaza in downtown Chambersburg. Gee Bee became Value City in 1992 but closed in 2008. The store was replaced with Burlington.

Crown American's mall portfolio was acquired by PREIT in 2003. In 2009, U.S. News & World Report named the mall one of the 10 most endangered in the United States, calling it a "sleepy mall a perennial underperformer". As of 2009, the mall had an occupancy rate of 62 percent and sales of $234 per square foot. In May 2012, the mall was put up for sale again. An October 2013 report by the Chambersburg Public Opinion confirmed that an unknown party had put a non-refundable deposit on the mall. In November 2013, the mall was officially sold to Mason Asset Management for $8.8 million. PREIT expected the net proceeds from the sale to be $8.4 million.

Sears closed at the mall in January 2015 and was replaced by Black Rose Antiques & Collectibles (known as Black Rose), an antique mall which also operates in Hanover, Pennsylvania and Allentown, Pennsylvania. JCPenney closed in mid July 2015 and in late August 2018, The Bon-Ton closed as a result of the entire chain filing for bankruptcy. Both the JCPenney and Bon-Ton spaces remain vacant. On January 18, 2019, Burlington closed at the mall leaving Black Rose Antiques & Collectables as the only anchor left.

Chambersburg Mall had as many as 75 stores at its peak in the 1990s and early 2000s. Throughout the 2000s, the number of stores and services dwindled down to approximately 30, including anchor store Black Rose Antiques & Collectibles and an AMC Classic movie theater. This was due to competition from newer shopping centers in the area, as well as other factors, including online shopping. Shortly before the mall's closure, there was only 1 retailer store left in operation: an art gallery which was open occasionally on weekends. This has since closed or moved elsewhere. AMC Theaters closed at the end of the day on April 16, 2023.

On June 8, 2023, Black Rose, the last anchor located at the mall, announced that they would be closing on June 30, 2023, marking an end to Chambersburg Mall. In the days leading to the closure of the mall, the owners of the property had considered re-developing it, but this was ultimately scrapped. The mall was officially closed on June 30, 2023. Since closing, the mall has not been sold for redevelopment due to a reported $20 million price tag, and numerous people have been charged with trespassing for attempting to enter the mall.

== See also ==
- List of shopping malls in Pennsylvania
