= Hagerstown Outlets =

Shopping center in Washington County, Maryland, U.S.

- The former Wolf’s Furniture store temporarily used as a COVID-19 vaccination site in March 2021 at the Hagerstown Outlets
- Location: Hagerstown, Maryland, United States
- Coordinates: 39.6080927°N 77.7331293°W
- Opened: 1998
- Previous names: Prime Outlets-Hagerstown (1998–2010); Hagerstown Premium Outlets (2010–2026)
- Developer: Prime Retail
- Manager: The Shopping Center Group LLC; TSCG Investors LLC
- Num. of stores: 100+ (at peak)
- Num. of anchor tenants: 1
- Floor area: 485,000 square feet (45,100 m^{2})
- Floors: 1
- Public transit: WCT bus: 552
- Website: www.premiumoutlets.com

Hagerstown Outlets (formerly Hagerstown Premium Outlets and Prime Outlets-Hagerstown) is an open-air outlet mall located along Interstate 70, 3 miles (4.8 km) east of the highway's junction with Interstate 81, in Hagerstown, Maryland, United States. It is one of two major shopping malls in Washington County (the other being the indoor Valley Mall).

== History ==
Built by Baltimore-based Prime Retail and was formerly named Prime Outlets-Hagerstown, the outlet center opened in August 1998 with over 50 stores. Subsequent additions in 1999 and 2000 brought the total number of stores to over 100. The center was designed with a village-style layout and walking lanes throughout. The outlet mall caters to residents in Hagerstown, surrounding Washington County, Washington, D.C., and Baltimore metro areas, and neighboring counties in Maryland, West Virginia, Pennsylvania, Virginia.

In late August 2010, the center was acquired by Simon Property Group's Premium Outlet sector along with the majority of the Prime Outlet centers and was renamed Hagerstown Premium Outlets in September 2010. The shopping center went into receivership after Simon (under affiliate Outlet Village of Hagerstown Limited Partnership) defaulted on its $68.4 million mortgage on February 6, 2026. The word 'Premium' was also dropped from the name and signage, becoming Hagerstown Outlets. On August 20, 2026, Kesa LLC, who operates Tim’s Furniture Mart, filed for Chapter 11 bankruptcy.
