= Shenango Valley Mall =

Former shopping mall in Hermitage, Pennsylvania

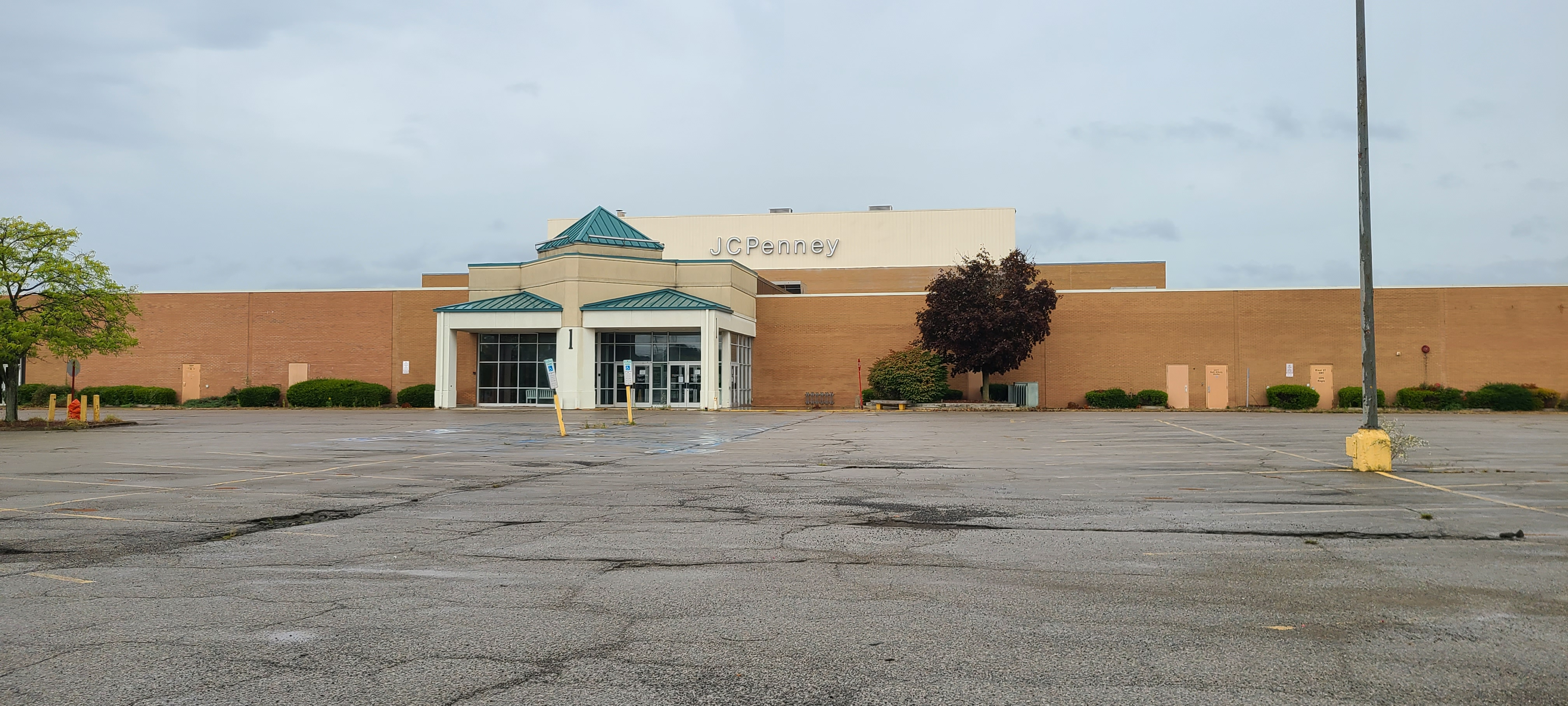
- The mall's southern entrance in September 2024
- Location: Hermitage, Pennsylvania, United States
- Coordinates: 41.2352778°N 80.44611111111111°W
- Address: 3303 East State Street
- Opened: March 13, 1968
- Closed: May 31, 2024
- Demolished: January 6 – February 23, 2025
- Developer: Crown American
- Manager: Penn Commercial
- Owner: Butterfli Holdings LLC
- Num. of anchor tenants: 3 at peak
- Floor area: 507,837 sq ft (47,179.6 m^{2}) (Note: Information varies, but all numbers are above 500,000 sq ft (46,000 m^{2}))
- Floors: 1
- Parking: 2,466 spaces

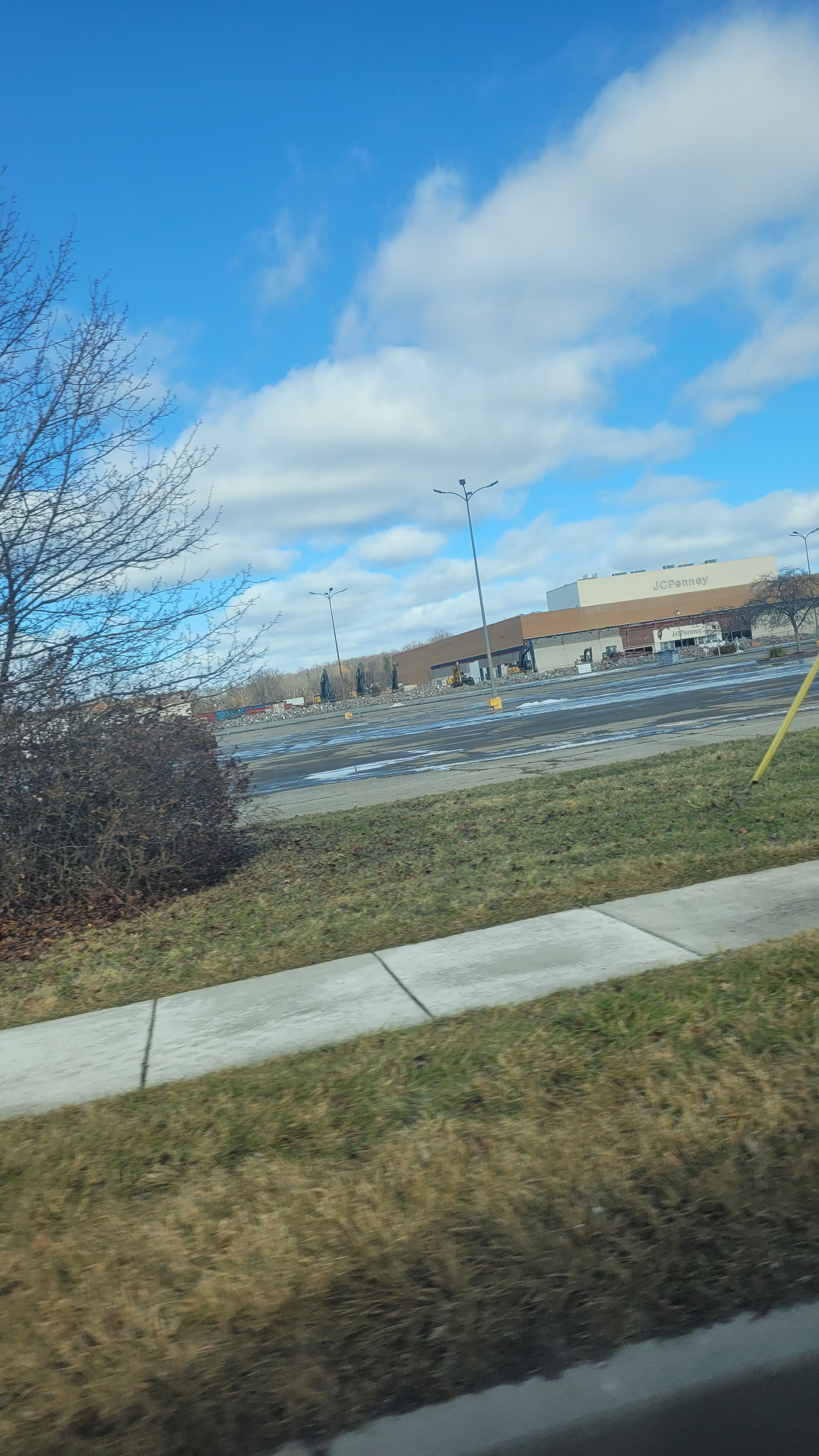
Demolition of the Shenango Valley Mall as of February 1st, 2025.

Shenango Valley Mall was a shopping mall in Hermitage, Pennsylvania, United States. It opened on March 13, 1968, and was closed on May 31, 2024, shortly after the closure of its final anchor store, JCPenney. It was demolished from January to February 2025, and is set to be redeveloped into a mixed-use commercial development named Hickory Fields.

== History ==
The land the Shenango Valley Mall sat on was owned by the McConnell family until its sale in 2022. The Shenango Valley Mall opened on March 13, 1968. JCPenney opened at the mall in January 1969, after being previously located in Sharon, Pennsylvania. The mall was renovated in 1997, costing $3.5 million. It was the mall's first major renovation since opening. Kaufmann's also expanded its store. Crown American sold the mall to PREIT in 2003. The mall was then sold by PREIT, along with five others to The Lightstone Group in 2004. Kaufmann's was re-branded as Macy's in August 2006. Shenango Valley Mall and three other malls entered receivership in January 2009, with Jones Lang LaSalle taking over management. Jones Lang LaSalle offered the mall, along with three others, for sale in May 2009. An attempted sale with two other malls failed in 2010.

Shenango Valley Mall made national news due to the closure of both its Macy's and Sears in March 2017. Sears Auto Center was not part of the closure. Firestone and Sears Auto Center were both damaged in the same month by a storm. In 2017, Hermitage City and School District challenged the mall's tax reassessment that significantly reduced its value due to the loss of two anchors. JSMN Shenango Valley Mall defaulted on the mall's $3.430 million loan in February 2018, with courts assigning Metro Commercial as the malls operator. The mall's lender, Iowa Square Realty LLC, won it at sheriff's sale for $50,000 in July 2018. Sears Auto Center closed in October 2018.

Court hearings occurred in December 2018 over Iowa Square Realty's ownership of the mall due to issues with maintenance, unpaid rent, and taxes. The mall in December was $243,000 in debt due to unpaid rent and taxes. Ownership of the mall was given to GFM-23 (McConnell family) by the court in January 2019 due to Iowa Square Realty not paying a court ordered $25,000 bond. Issues in early 2019 include the parking lot and a leaky roof. The mall's tax assessment issues were resolved in June 2019.

=== JCPenney lawsuits ===
In August 2019, GFM-23 reached an agreement to sell the mall to Akron-based developer LRC Realty, who had previously redeveloped a similar mall, The Block Northway, in Pittsburgh's North Hills. On November 7, 2019, the JCPenney Corporation filed a complaint against GFM-23, citing its 1960s lease and owner agreements with the McConnell family and other parties. This agreement was interpreted by JCPenney as giving them the right to approve any changes to the mall's building. The McConnell family argued that these lease agreements were expired, while JCPenney argued that a lease extension agreement in 2003 extended the original 45-year terms of those in the 1960s. This led to LRC Realty not completing their purchase of the mall.

In February 2022, the McConnell family won a Court of Common Pleas decision against JCPenney regarding the mall's redevelopment. Thereafter, in August 2022, the mall was sold to Cleveland-based Butterfli Holdings LLC, a subsidiary of Flicore LLC, which prompted JCPenney to appeal the case to the Pennsylvania Superior Court and Supreme Court. These appeals were denied on October 13, 2023.

On March 8, 2023, Butterfli Holdings sent an eviction notice to JCPenney which would have resulted in its closure by April 8, 2023. JCPenney still occupied the site in August, prompting Butterfli Holdings to announce its intent to sue JCPenney for refusal to vacate the property. In January 2024, JCPenney announced it would close at the Shenango Valley Mall in May. JCPenney closed on May 5, 2024.

=== Closure, demolition and redevelopment ===
On May 31, 2024, the Shenango Valley Mall permanently closed. Demolition began on January 6, 2025, and redevelopment plans were announced on January 13. Demolition was completed on February 23, 2025. The property is to be renamed to Hickory Fields, and its first phase in the western half of the property will include several establishments including Chili's, LongHorn Steakhouse, Chick-fil-A, and Target.
