= Uniontown Mall =

Shopping mall in South Union Township, Pennsylvania, U.S.

Coordinates: 39.90506°N 79.74692°W

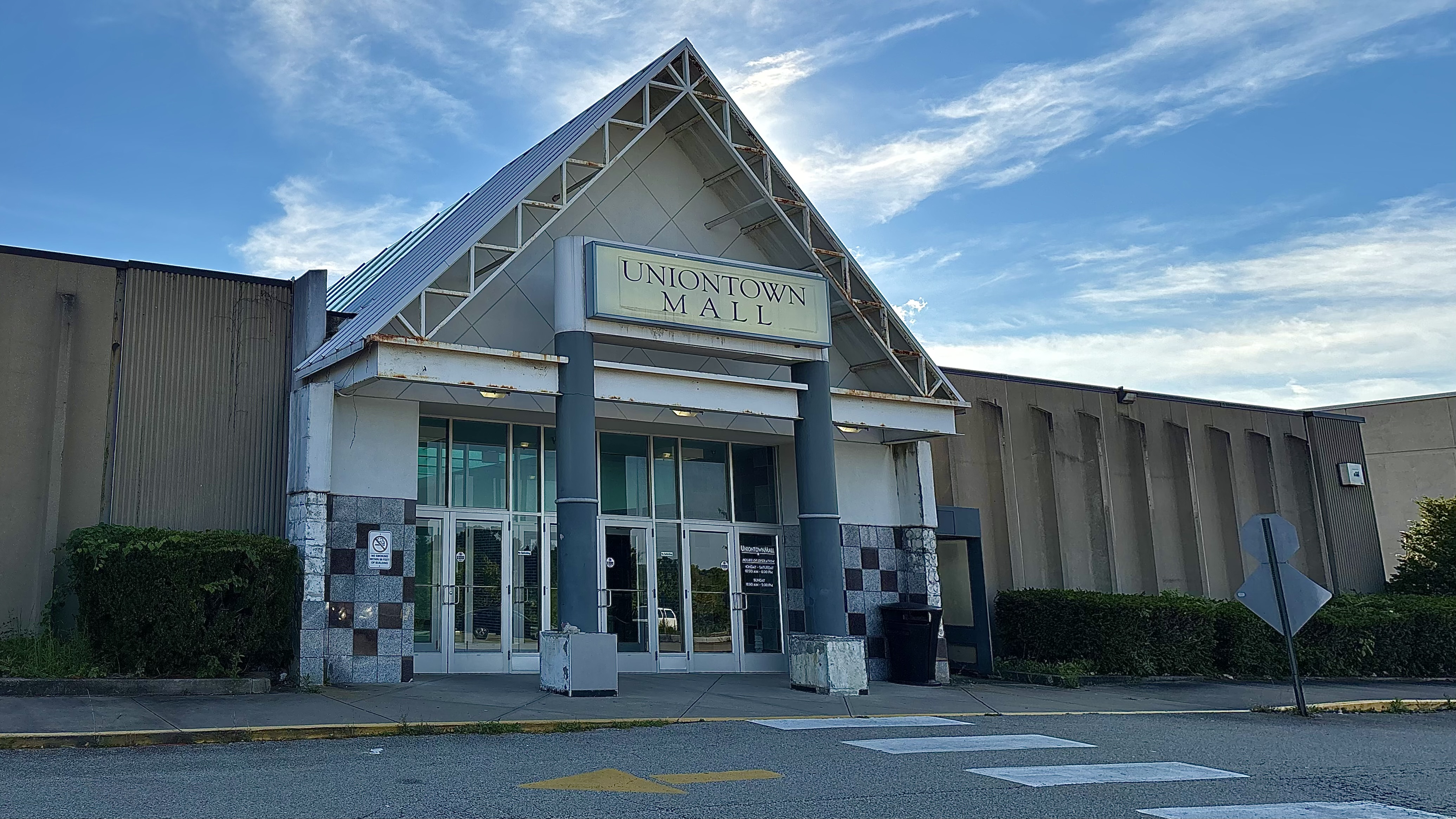
- Entrance to the mall in August 2026
- Location: South Union Township, Pennsylvania, U.S.
- Opened: 1972
- Developer: Crown American
- Manager: Mason Asset Management
- Owner: Namdar Realty Group
- Num. of stores: 40+
- Num. of anchor tenants: 6 (4 open, 2 vacant)
- Floor area: 698,012 square feet (65,000 m^{2})
- Floors: 1
- Public transit: FACT bus: Uniontown A, Shuttle
- Website: www.shopuniontownmall.com

Uniontown Mall is a regional mall in South Union Township, Pennsylvania, just outside the city of Uniontown. The anchor stores are JCPenney, NextWave Industries, Stronghold Training Center, and CrossFit Uniontown. Four vacant anchor stores were once The Bon-Ton, Sears, and Burlington.

== History ==
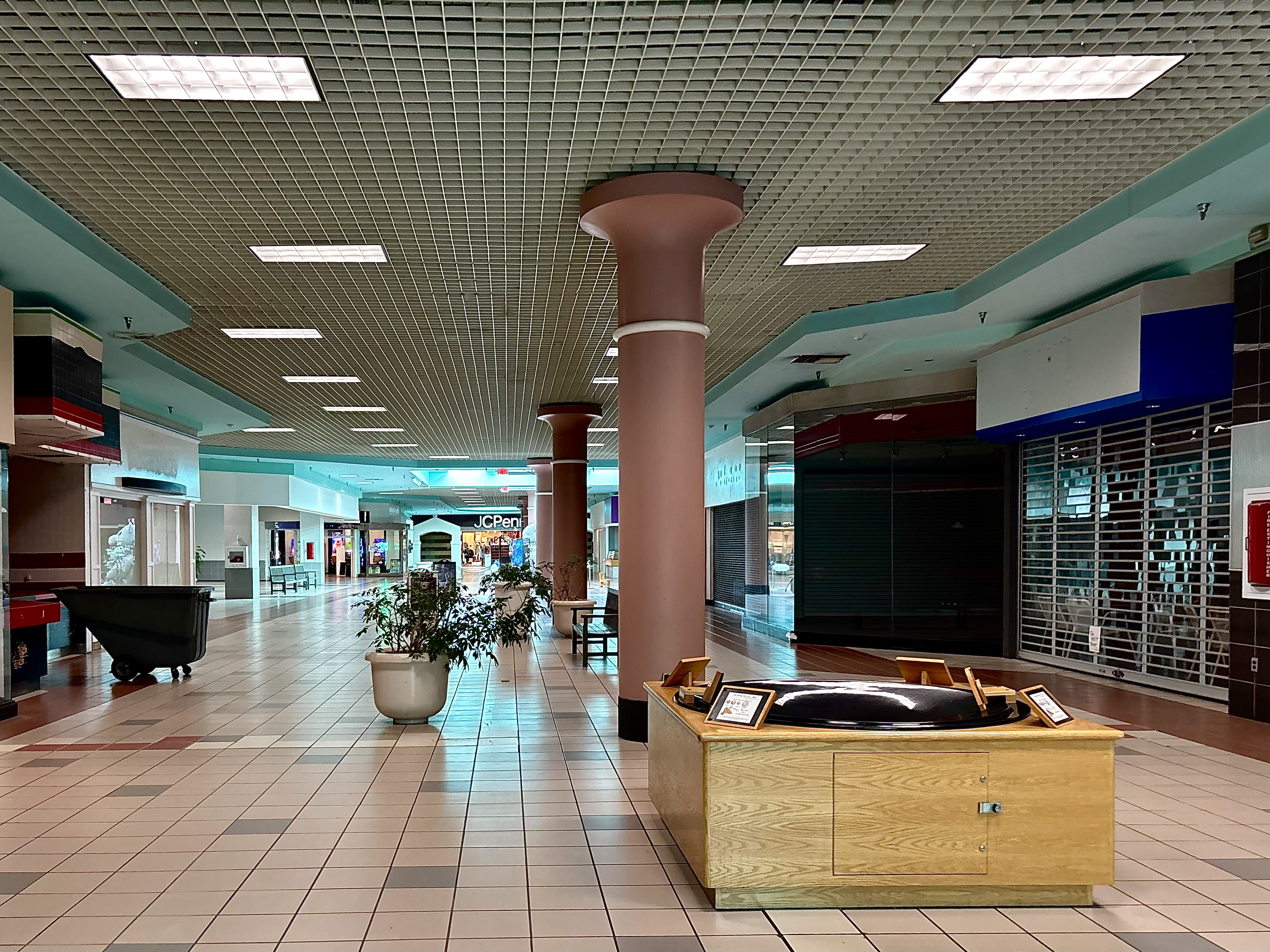
South wing of the Uniontown Mall

The one-story Uniontown Mall was developed by Crown American and opened in 1972. Sears and Gee Bee were the mall's original anchor stores. A Bon-Ton department store opened at the mall in 1975, while JCPenney and Hess's subsequently became additional anchor tenants.

In 1992, the Gee Bee store was replaced by Value City. The former Hess's store closed in 1999 and was subsequently divided for other uses, including space occupied by Timeless Traditions furniture and TeleTech Customer Care. TeleTech provided customer-service and related services for outside companies. By the mid-2000s, the mall's tenants included Value City, Sears, JCPenney, Bon-Ton, TeleTech Customer Care, and other retailers.

In 2003, Uniontown Mall became part of the portfolio of Pennsylvania Real Estate Investment Trust (PREIT) when PREIT acquired Crown American's shopping-mall portfolio. The transaction included Uniontown Mall among the properties transferred to PREIT.

Section of Uniontown Mall’s food court, closed to the public as of 2026

Value City closed its Uniontown Mall location in 2007. The former Value City space was subsequently occupied by Burlington Coat Factory, which opened at the mall in August 2008. The new store employed approximately 65 full- and part-time employees, including some former Value City employees. By 2008, the mall's principal anchor tenants were Burlington Coat Factory, JCPenney, Sears, and Bon-Ton.

In January 2015, PREIT announced plans to sell Uniontown Mall as part of a program to dispose of properties that it considered non-core. The sale was completed in August 2015 for $23 million. Namdar Realty Group, a real-estate investment company based in Great Neck, New York, acquired the mall.

At the time of the 2015 sale, Uniontown Mall contained approximately 699,000 square feet of retail space and was anchored by JCPenney, Sears, Bon-Ton, Burlington Coat Factory, and TeleTech Customer Care.

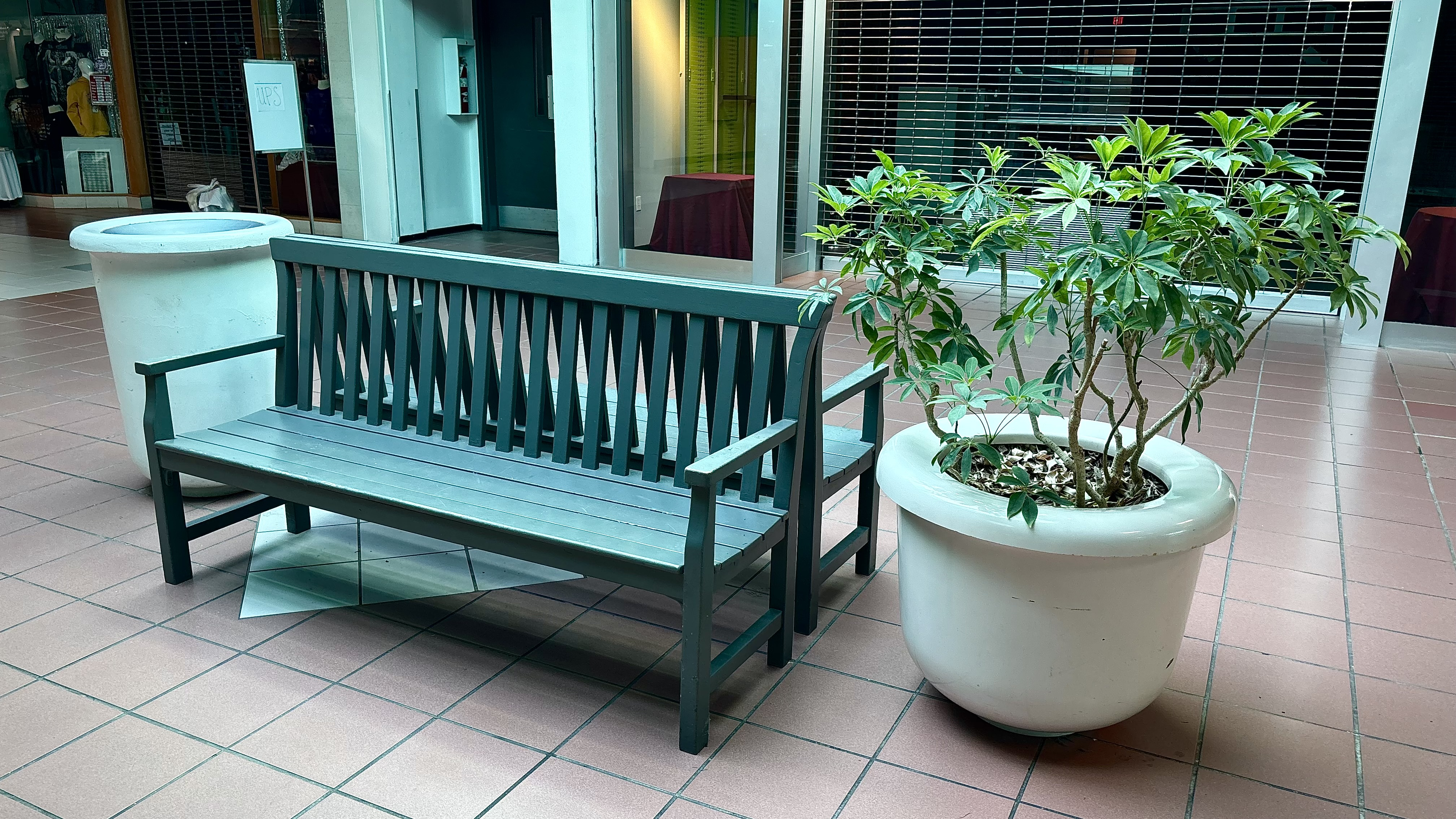
Bench at Uniontown Mall

Sears announced in January 2017 that its Uniontown Mall store would close as part of a nationwide round of store closures. The store closed in March 2017. Sears had been one of the mall's original anchor stores since its opening in 1972.

The Bon-Ton closed its Uniontown Mall store in August 2018 as the company liquidated its stores following its bankruptcy and subsequent liquidation. The closure left JCPenney as the mall's only traditional department-store anchor.

In December 2018, Burlington announced that it would not renew its lease at Uniontown Mall. The store subsequently closed in January 2019. Dunham's Sports also closed its Uniontown Mall location in January 2019.

The mall's movie theater operated under several names, including Carmike Cinemas and AMC Theatres. AMC Classic Uniontown 6 closed permanently in July 2021, leaving its former six-screen theater space vacant.

In August 2025, Claire's announced that its Uniontown Mall store would close as part of the company's bankruptcy proceedings. The closure was part of a nationwide group of store closings announced following the company's second Chapter 11 bankruptcy filing.

In November 2025, South Union Township filed a lawsuit against Namdar Realty Group and Uniontown Mall Realty over alleged safety violations and deteriorating conditions at the mall. The township's complaint alleged several hazards on the property, including deteriorating road surfaces, rodent infestations, and blocked or otherwise obstructed emergency exits.

In 2026, the mall's owners were ordered to address safety problems identified in the township's lawsuit. The court proceedings concerned alleged maintenance and safety deficiencies at the property, while JCPenney remained the mall's principal department-store tenant.
