= Patrick Henry Mall =

Shopping Mall in Newport News, Virginia, US

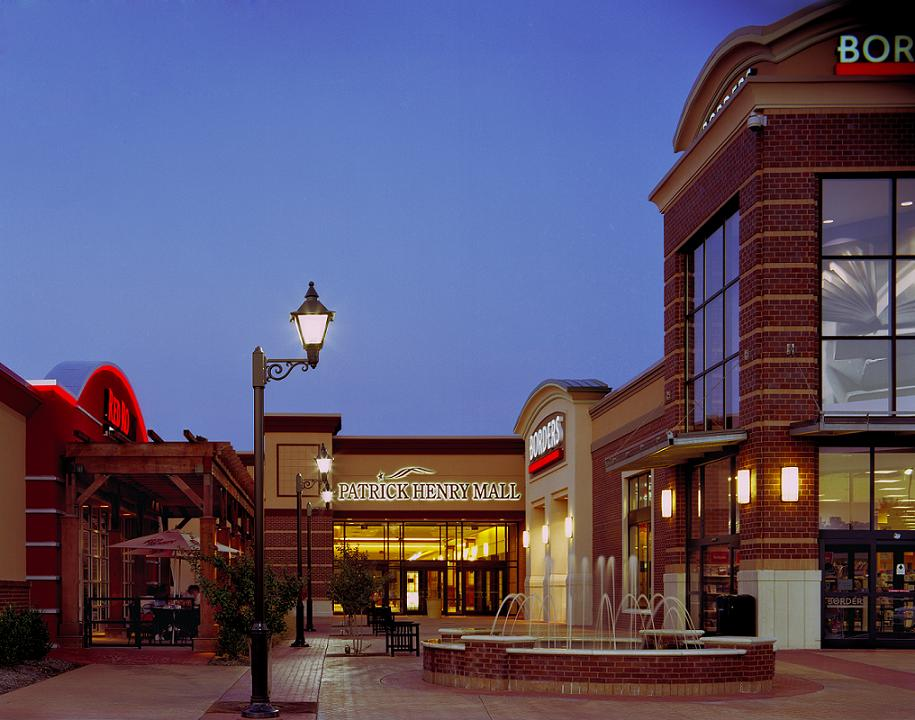
- Red Robin & Former Borders Evening Photo
- Location: Newport News, Virginia, United States
- Coordinates: 37°6′44.5″N 76°29′43.9″W
- Opened: 1987; 39 years ago
- Developer: Crown American
- Owner: PREIT
- Num. of stores: 120+
- Num. of anchor tenants: 4
- Floor area: 717,000 square feet (67,000 m^{2})
- Floors: 1
- Website: shoppatrickhenrymall.com

Patrick Henry Mall is a shopping mall in Newport News, Virginia. It is located on Interstate 64 Westbound and Jefferson Ave (Virginia State Route 143) at exit 255A. The mall is anchored by Dillard's, Dick's Sporting Goods, J. C. Penney and Macy's. In 2017 Patrick Henry lost Old Navy - a major tenant - when it chose to leave and move to Jefferson Commons. On November 30th, 2025, a shooting occurred at the mall, killing one person and a suspect in custody.

== History ==
Patrick Henry Mall, which is named after the adjacent Patrick Henry International Airport, opened as the Peninsula area's third enclosed regional mall in 1987. It was built on a site previously occupied by a large dairy farm run by the Yoders, a local Mennonite family. It was the first mall in the region to feature a food court. Built by Crown American, it was originally anchored by Hess's, Leggett, and Bradlees. The Bradlees store became Uptons in 1988. Hess's sold its store in the mall to Proffitt's in 1995; both it and the Leggett became Dillard's stores in 1998. A 1998 expansion added Hecht's (rebranded Macy's in 2006). Uptons closed in 1999 and became J. C. Penney in 2000.

Dillard's consolidated operations into the former Leggett building in 2004. The former Hess's/Proffitt's/Dillard's Home Store was then torn down for a 2005-2006 expansion which included a Dick's Sporting Goods, Borders Books & Music, plus New York & Company, Red Robin, and new locations for existing retailers American Eagle Outfitters, Bath & Body Works, Victoria's Secret, Express, and Hallmark Cards. Borders closed in early 2011 and became Forever 21 in October 2012. Forever 21 closed in Spring 2025 as a result of the company’s bankruptcy.

In September 2017, Tilt Studio announced that will be opening this location, with J.P. Pepperoni restaurant, mini bowling alley, one-story laser tag, games and others. This opened on December 18, 2017, in the former AMC 7/Old Navy.
