= North Hanover Mall =

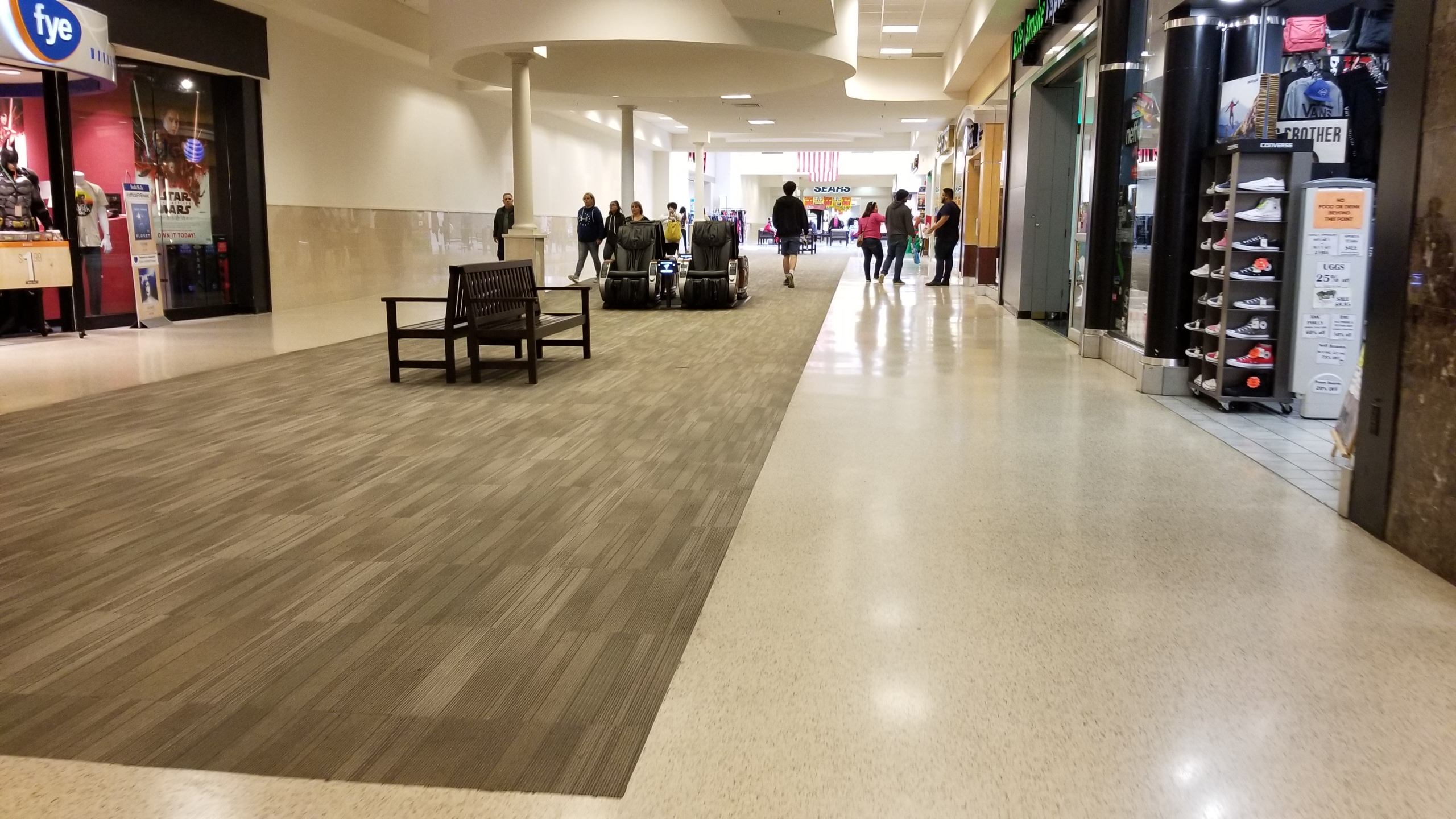
- Interior of North Hanover Mall, April 2018
- Location: Hanover, Pennsylvania, United States
- Coordinates: 39.82093°N 76.99356°W
- Address: 1155 Carlisle Street
- Opened: 1967
- Closed: 2025
- Developer: Crown American
- Manager: Mason Asset Management
- Owner: Namdar Realty Group
- Num. of stores: 30
- Num. of anchor tenants: 3 (1 open, 2 vacant)
- Floor area: 452,000 sq ft (42,000 m^{2})
- Floors: 1 (2 in former JCPenney)
- Public transit: rabbittransit bus: 20N, 22N
- Website: northhanovermall.com

North Hanover Mall was a shopping mall in Hanover, Pennsylvania. It was anchored by Rural King.

== History ==
The mall opened in 1967 as an open-air strip including W.T. Grant, Town & Country (a discount chain then owned by Lane Bryant), Sears, and Food Fair. In 1969 and 1970, it underwent reconstruction to become an enclosed shopping mall, with The Bon-Ton moving from an existing store downtown and JCPenney joining. The Town & Country store became Kmart, which moved out in 1995 to a Superstore nearby that closed in 2004 and became Black Rose Antiques. The Bon-Ton moved out in 2006. After Black Rose Antiques moved out of the mall, construction began in 2007 to demolish the former Black Rose building for a Dick's Sporting Goods, while also demolishing the former Bon-Ton for a two-story Boscov's. Although Boscov's was originally to open in 2008, its opening date was later pushed back to 2009, but in April of that year, the mall's manager confirmed that Boscov's would not be opening in that space. In 2012, JCPenney moved into the space originally planned for Boscov's.

On September 9, 2014, PREIT sold the North Hanover Mall, as well as State College's Nittany Mall, for a combined $32.3 million. It sold the North Hanover Mall as part of a portfolio-improvement initiative it launched in 2012, which involved selling underperforming properties. The 452,000-square-foot North Hanover Mall had sales of $275 per square foot at the end of June and a non-anchor occupancy of 72.8 percent, according to the trust. Sales and occupancy at the mall lagged the trust's portfolio, which had averaged sales of $378 per square foot and non-anchor occupancy of 89.5 percent for the same time period. The buyer of the mall was Mason Asset Management of Great Neck, New York.

On January 4, 2018, it was announced that Sears would be closing as part of a plan to close 103 stores nationwide. The store closed in April 2018. On June 4, 2020, JCPenney announced that this location would be closing on October 18, 2020, as part of a plan to close 154 stores nationwide. A Rural King store opened in the former Sears location in Spring of 2021. Hiring for the new anchor store began in mid-December 2020. On March 28, 2022, a fire broke out on the roof of the former JCPenney building in one of the HVAC units, causing an estimated $1 million in damage to the building as well as the attached mall. The former JCPenney has since been demolished. On February 21, 2025, Burlington closed their doors at this location leaving Rural King as the sole operating anchor.

On November 17, 2025, Hanover Borough officials condemned the North Hanover Mall until repairs have been made due to a wall partially collapsing where the former JCPenney store used to be..
