= Phillipsburg Mall =

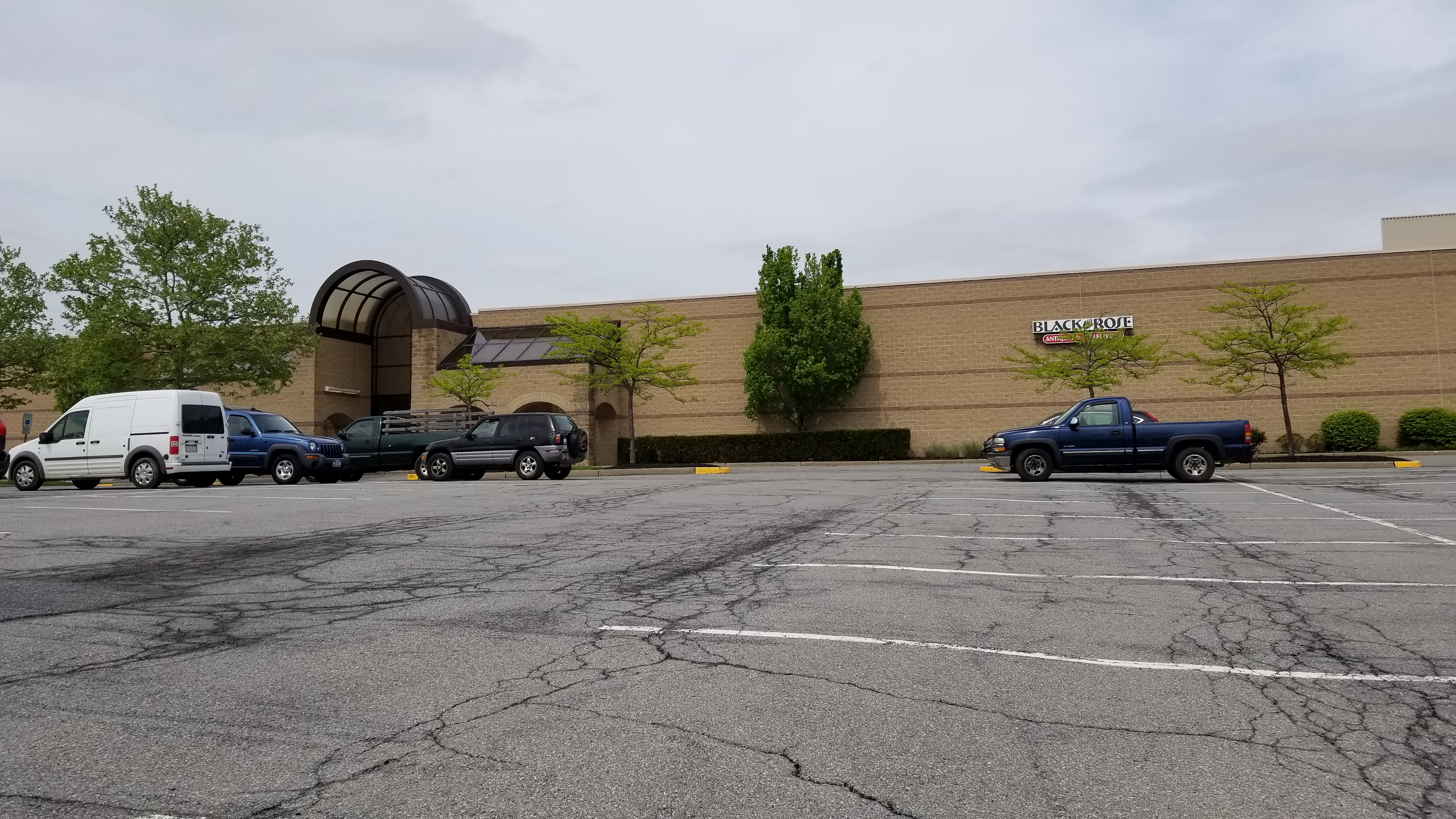
- Exterior view of Phillipsburg Mall, May 2018
- Location: Lopatcong Township and Pohatcong Township, New Jersey, United States
- Coordinates: 40.685°N 75.154°W
- Opened: September 24, 1989
- Closed: March 18, 2020
- Developer: Crown American
- Owner: Mason Asset Management, Namdar Realty Group
- Num. of anchor tenants: 4 (1 open, 3 closed and later demolished)
- Floor area: 578,925 square feet (53,784 m^{2})
- Floors: 1

Phillipsburg Mall was an indoor shopping mall located along U.S. Route 22 in Warren County, New Jersey, United States. Despite its name, the mall was actually located on the border of Lopatcong Township and Pohatcong Township, just east of Phillipsburg.

The mall was located on the eastern edge of the Lehigh Valley, the metropolitan area of Allentown, Pennsylvania. The mall's anchor store was Kohl's. Other anchor stores were The Bon-Ton, Sears, and Black Rose Antiques & Collectibles. Demolition of the remaining mall structures began in February 2024 and was completed by July 2024.

== History ==
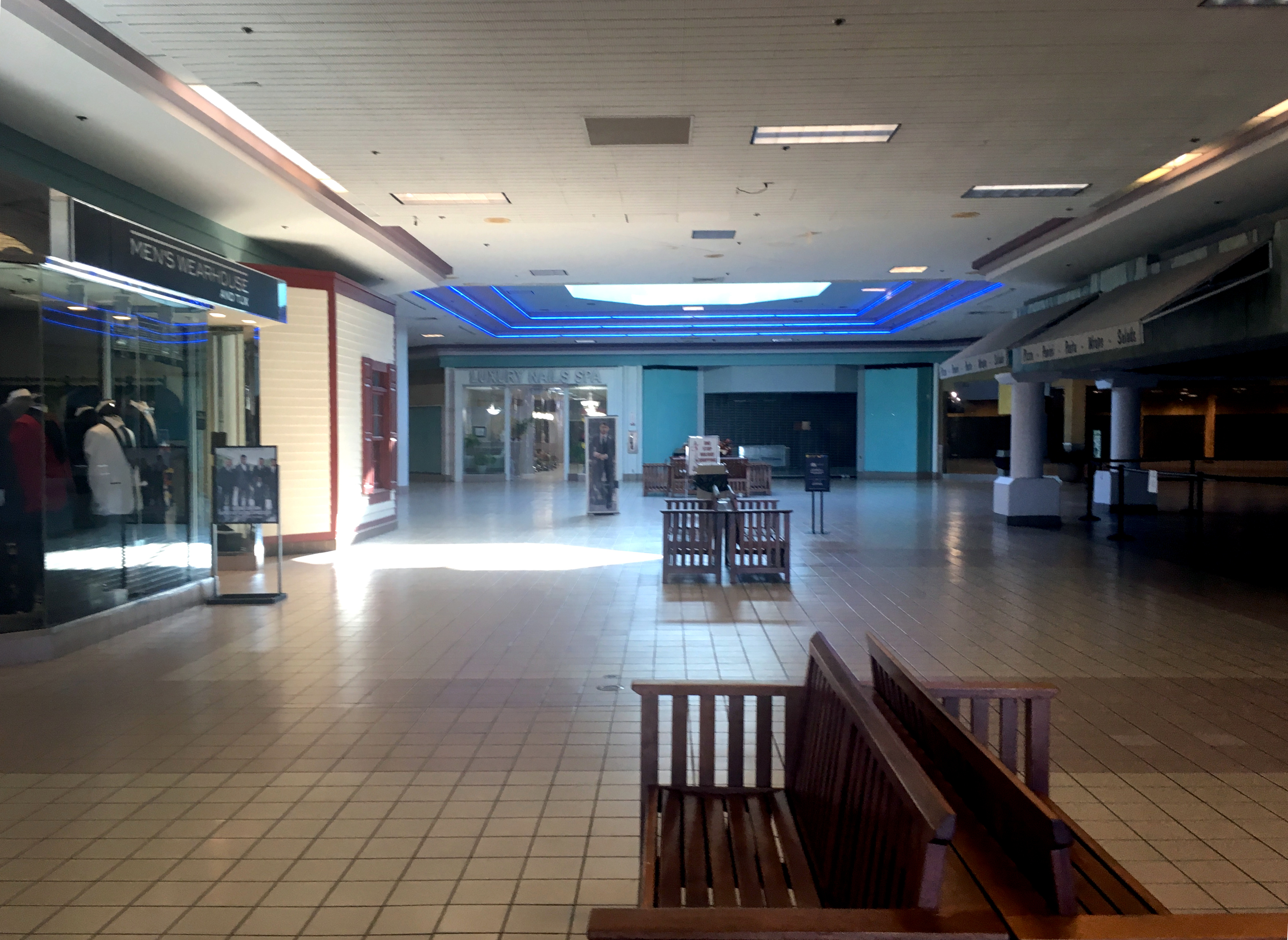
Interior view of Phillipsburg Mall, March 2019

Crown American first announced Phillipsburg Mall in 1985. The original anchor stores chosen were Bradlees, Sears, and Hess's, then a subsidiary of Crown American. As Bradlees was undergoing store closings at the time, Crown American instead chose to make that anchor space a Kmart. The Mall was originally slated for a 1987 opening, but was delayed due to highway and sewage system issues. Upon opening on September 24, 1989, the mall had Kmart, Hess's (the first and only location in New Jersey), and Sears as its anchor stores, as well as 90 smaller stores, with more to come later in the year. Over 7,000 people attended the mall's grand opening. The Hess's store even had to skip its ribbon-cutting ceremony due to the crowd of 2,000–3,000 waiting to shop there. Traffic on U.S Route 22 was backed up to a mile from the mall in both directions on opening day. JCPenney would later open in March 1990. The Hess's store was sold to The Bon-Ton in 1994. Kmart closed its store at Phillipsburg Mall in 2002 as part of bankruptcy proceedings; one year later, the space was sold to Kohl's. The store would open in April 2004.

PREIT, which acquired the Crown American portfolio in 2003, made plans with CREATE Architecture in the mid-2000s to renovate the mall with a more modern look, however, those plans fell through. PREIT sold the mall to Mason Asset Management/Namdar Realty Group for $11.5 million in 2013. On January 15, 2014, it was announced that the JCPenney store would be closing as part of a plan to close 33 locations nationwide. In addition to this anchor, many stores left the mall in 2013 and 2014.

As those stores were closing, other new shops began to open. An antique shop called Black Rose Antiques & Collectibles began to occupy the former JCPenney space. The store opened on January 1, 2017. Meanwhile, a record store called Spin Me Round Records opened near the former JCPenney space. In 2017, a Gold's Gym opened in the space once occupied by Hot Topic and several restaurants.

On November 2, 2017, Sears Holdings announced that Sears would also be closing as part of a plan to close 63 Sears and Kmart stores nationwide. The Phillipsburg Mall location closed on January 28, 2018.

In November, 2017, Bon-Ton, struggling with around $1.1 billion in debt, announced a plan to close over 40 stores in 2018, including its Phillipsburg Mall location. On January 31, 2018, Bon-Ton confirmed that closing sales would begin February 1 and run for 10–12 weeks until the store is closed in April. The store closed on April 29, 2018.

In August 2018, due to a heavy rain storm, an approximately 200 sq ft (19 m^{2}) portion of roof in the former Sears collapsed. Due to the roof collapse, stores that were on the Sears side of the mall moved closer to the Kohls side of the mall and Sears was blocked off. In September 2018, the Old Navy store, that had opened around 2000, had closed and relocated down the street to a Shopping Center.

The former Sears was demolished in August 2019, followed by the former Bon-Ton in October of that year. Demolition on the remaining parts of the mall began in February 2024.

== Closure and redevelopment ==
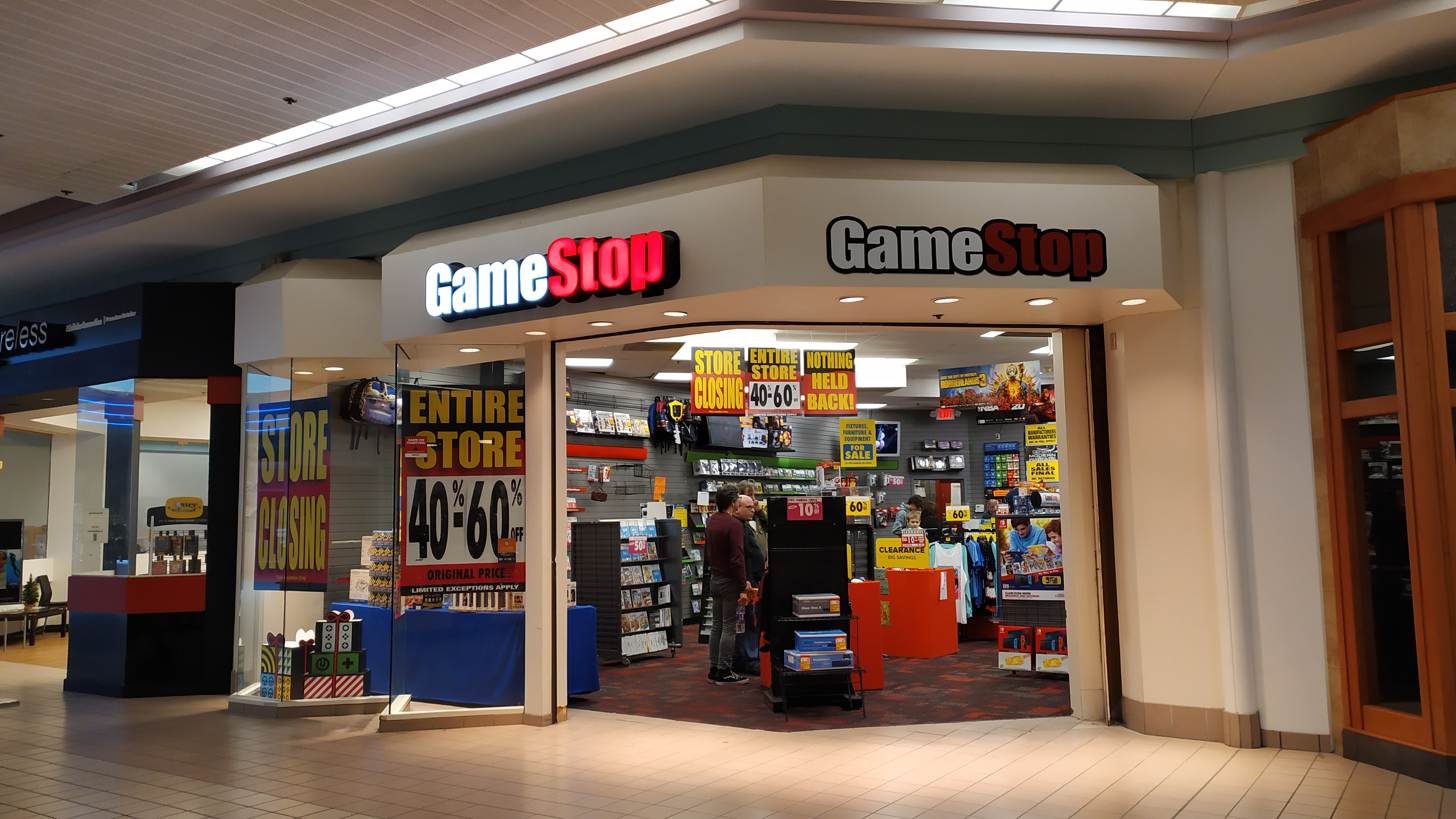
GameStop at Phillipsburg Mall prior to the mall's demolition, January 2020

Mason Asset Management President Elliot Nassim said in March 2019 that the property "...is better suited as something other than a mall." Throughout 2019, many stores in the mall closed, including AT&T, Gold's Gym, H&M, Victoria's Secret, and others. On December 23, 2019, the remaining tenants of Phillipsburg Mall received lease termination notifications, informing them they had 30 days to vacate the mall. As of July 2020, the interior mall was shuttered. On January 28, 2020, Black Rose Antiques announced that it would be closing in March 2020. In March 2020, Kohl's stated that it would not be closing because it is separately owned.

On January 29, 2021, Mason Asset Management announced that demolition of the mall is scheduled to begin "within the next couple of weeks" and will be completed by June 2021 to make way for a proposed 852,000-square-foot (79,200 m^{2}) warehouse. This was delayed to early 2024 in February when demolition began, and was completed by the summer of that year.
