= Jacksonville Mall =

- Location: Jacksonville, North Carolina, United States
- Coordinates: 34.765125°N 77.380542°W
- Address: 375 Jacksonville Mall
- Opened: 1981
- Developer: Alpha National
- Owner: PREIT
- Num. of stores: 60-67
- Num. of anchor tenants: 3 (1 vacant)
- Floor area: 495,000 square feet (46,000 m^{2})
- Website: shopjacksonvillemall.com

Jacksonville Mall is a shopping mall located in Jacksonville, North Carolina. It is anchored by Belk and JCPenney. The mall is located near Camp Lejeune.

== History ==
Crown American Realty Trust purchased Jacksonville Mall from Beckley-Jacksonville LP for $38 million in 1998. The mall was an American Red Cross location after Hurricane Floyd in 1999. Belk received a major renovation and minor expansion in mid-2012. The mall suffered serious roof damage during September 2018's Hurricane Florence, with only a few stores having no damage. Jacksonville Mall had previously not suffered this amount of damage. Most stores reopened by November 2018 for Black Friday, with Barnes & Noble and Belk remaining closed. Barnes & Noble reopened in late January 2019. Belk reopened in late April 2019 after repairing serious hurricane damage. Sears closed in spring 2020.
