= Magnolia Mall =

- Location: Florence, South Carolina, United States
- Coordinates: 34.191664°N 79.833576°W
- Address: 2701 David McLeod Boulevard
- Opened: 1979
- Developer: Equity Properties
- Owner: PREIT
- Num. of stores: 50+
- Num. of anchor tenants: 7
- Floor area: 613,500 ft^{2} (57,000 m^{2})
- Floors: 1
- Website: shopmagnoliamall.com

Magnolia Mall is a shopping mall in Florence, South Carolina, located at Interstate 20 Business (I-20 Bus.) near I-95 and the eastern terminus of I-20. It is owned by PREIT. The mall opened in 1979, and underwent a renovation in 2008. It underwent a further renovation in 2019, adding H&M, Five Below, and Burlington. Other major stores at the mall are Best Buy, Belk, Dick's Sporting Goods, and Tilt Studios. Burlington replaced a Sears which closed in 2017. On June 4, 2020, JCPenney announced that it would close by around October 2020 as part of a plan to close 154 stores nationwide. In October 2021, Tilt Studios opened in the former space occupied by JCPenney.

Roses was an original tenant of the mall, and closed in 2002 to be replaced by Best Buy and the food court.

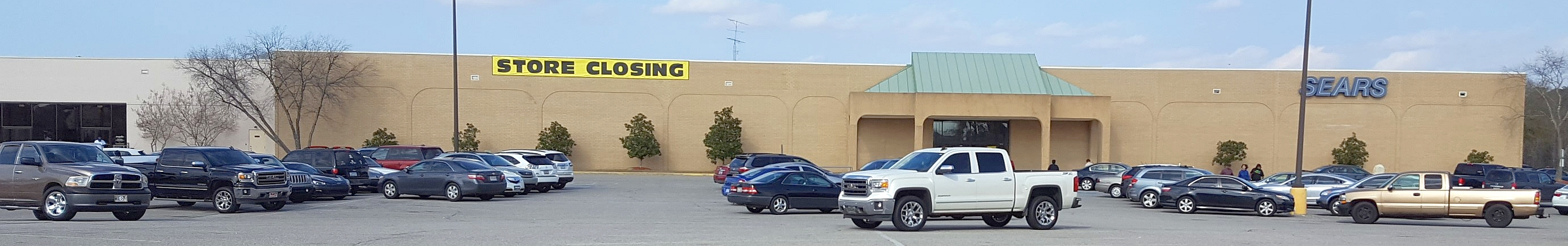
Magnolia Mall, February 2017 following Sears closure
