= West Manchester Town Center =

Coordinates: 39.9700°N 76.7724°W

- Location: West Manchester Township, York County, Pennsylvania
- Address: 415 Town Center Dr, York, PA 17408
- Opened: 1981 (original indoormall) 2014 (current outdoor mall)
- Closed: 2014 (original indoor mall)
- Developer: Crown American
- Owner: Paramount Realty
- Public transit: rabbittransit bus: 1W, 13

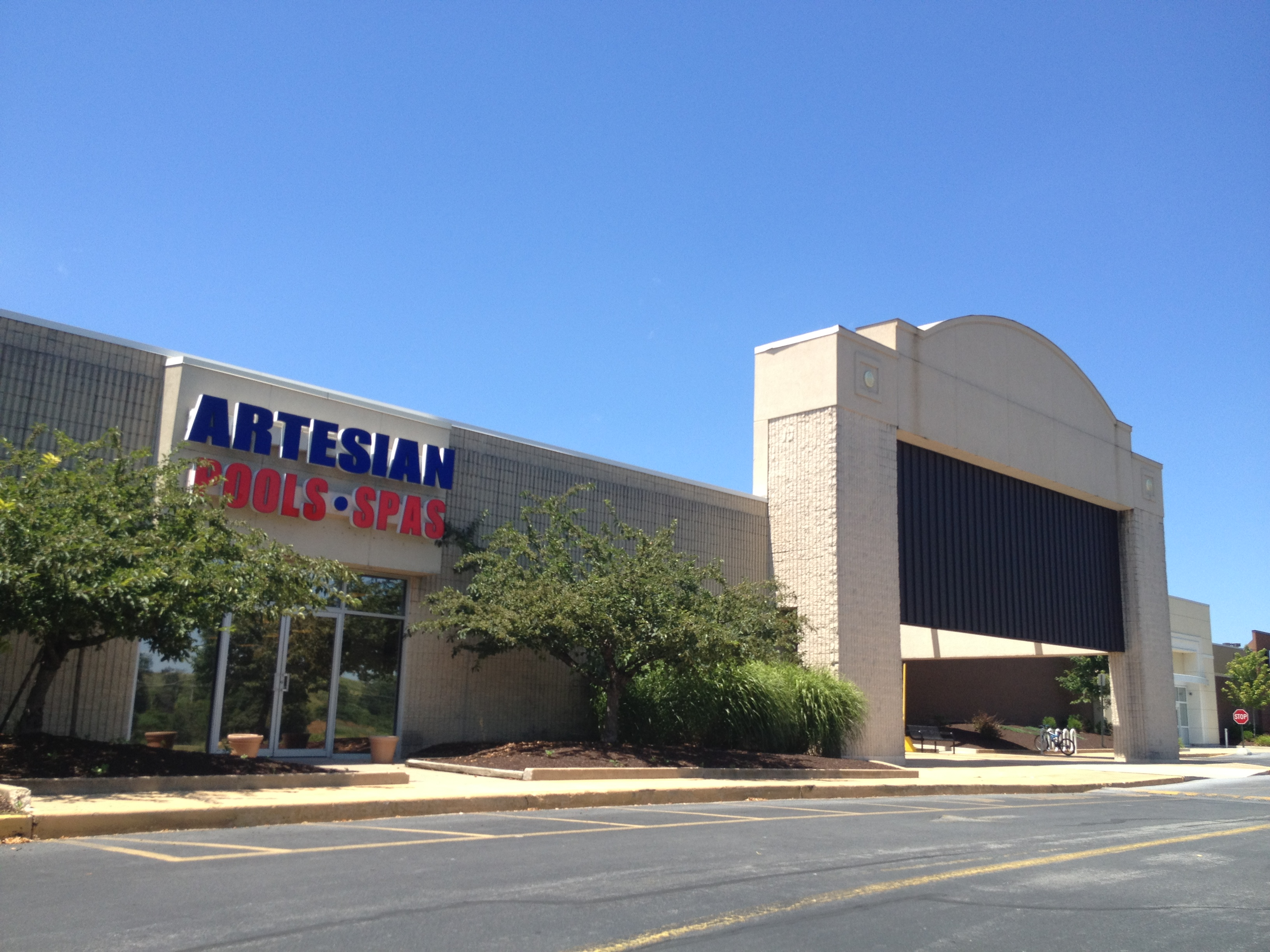
Exterior view of former West Manchester Mall, July 2012

West Manchester Town Center is an open-air shopping center in West Manchester Township, York County, Pennsylvania, west of the city of York. It replaces the former West Manchester Mall, an enclosed, one-story shopping mall.

== History ==
Crown American opened West Manchester Mall in 1981. At the time, it featured Hess's, The Bon-Ton and Gee Bee Department Stores as its anchor stores. The mall also featured popular restaurants such as Chick-fil-A, Orange Julius, and McDonald's. Gee Bee later became Value City in 1992. Hecht's (later Macy's) was added in 1995. Since the opening of the York Galleria mall on the eastern side of York, West Manchester Mall began to decline.

Hess's closed in 1993, with Walmart replacing it the same year. To keep attracting customers, the developers expanded the mall in the late 1990s by adding, Auntie Anne's, Subway, and Regal Cinemas. Wal-Mart expanded from a discount store to a SuperCenter in 2003, displacing a hallway and closing off its mall entrance, which led to a massive decline in customers to that side of the mall. Throughout the 2000s, the mall continued to lose many stores, many of which already had locations at the York Galleria. Value City closed in 2008, and the space became occupied by Kohl's in 2010. In 2011, a small tornado caused damage to the mall by shattering a skylight, blowing debris, and causing power outages. The same year, Bon-Ton announced that its West Manchester store would close in January.

== Redevelopment ==
Many shoppers believed the mostly-empty mall greatly needed to be revamped. In September 2012, the Texas-based M&R Investors purchased the West Manchester Mall for approximately $17.5 million. The group planned a $47 million renovation, which would keep the existing anchor stores and demolish the mall to create a new outdoor shopping center called the West Manchester Town Center, similar to the Hunt Valley Towne Centre in Hunt Valley, Maryland. The project intends to attract national retailers and restaurants to occupy the former mall site. Additional improvements are also being made, including increased visibility from US 30, an additional entrance, and a drive-through street to access the new stores. A demolition permit was filed and West Manchester Mall closed permanently in 2014 to prepare for the redevelopment.

In August 2014, Macy's announced that it would close its West Manchester store. Retailers such as Petco, Burlington Coat Factory, and DSW Shoe Warehouse were confirmed as upcoming tenants in the redevelopment. In May 2022, ATR Corinth Partners sold the town center to Paramount Realty.
