= The Point at Carlisle Plaza =

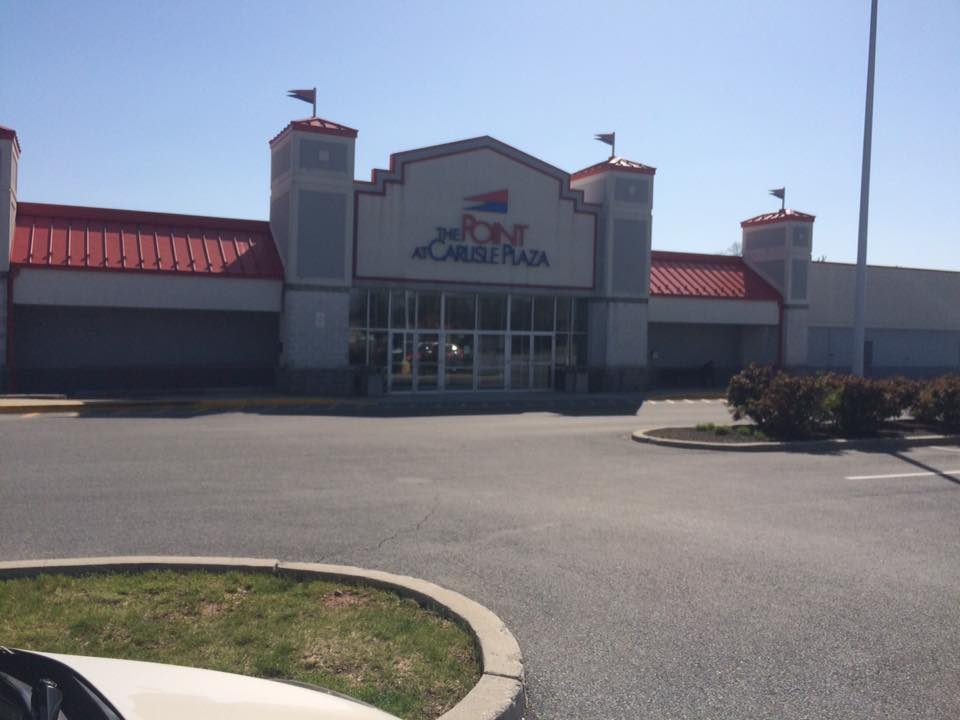
- The mall's main entrance in 2018.
- Location: Carlisle, Pennsylvania, United States
- Coordinates: 40.198056°N 77.172222°W
- Address: 800 East High Street
- Opened: 1964
- Developer: Crown American
- Owner: Point Plaza LLC (Giant)
- Num. of stores: Less than 15
- Num. of anchor tenants: 2
- Floor area: 182,859 square feet (17,000 m^{2})
- Floors: 1

The Point at Carlisle Plaza (formerly Carlisle Plaza and Carlisle Plaza Mall) is a shopping mall located in Carlisle, Pennsylvania. It is anchored by Dunham's Sports and Lowe's.

== History ==
Carlisle Plaza was built as an open-air shopping plaza in 1964, with backing from David Javitch, founder of Giant Food Stores, and his son, Lee, who would soon become president and CEO of Giant. Under the ownership of Crown American Realty Trust (then called Crown Construction Company), plans were announced in 1968 for an expansion of the plaza into an enclosed mall. The enlarged and enclosed mall opened in 1976. Crown American sold the mall to Michael Joseph Development Corporation under the name Carlisle Realty Partners for $5.8 million in November 2002. In August 2003 the mall was renamed from Carlisle Plaza Mall to The Point at Carlisle Plaza. It was reconfigured in the early 2000s with 200,000 sq ft. being removed including two anchor buildings formerly occupied by Albion Point Antiques & Collectibles/Kmart and J. C. Penney. A mural about the history of Carlisle located in the mall had to be relocated before the construction. Lowe's would open on the former space in February 2004, and also owns its store. The malls renovations would cost $4 million.

Cedar (Cedar Carlisle LLC) purchased the mall in August 2005 for $11 million. Dunham's Sports opened at the mall in late September 2005. Giant (Point Plaza LLC) purchased the mall for $7.35 million in October 2012. The Bon-Ton announced in late January 2018 its store would be closing. The former Bon-Ton was used in January 2019 for storage of new Giant shopping carts.
