= Crown American =

American real estate investment firm

- Type: Private
- Industry: Commercial real estate
- Founded: 1950
- Headquarters: Johnstown, Pennsylvania, U.S.
- Key people: Michael A. Barletta, President and CEO
- Products: Hotels, restaurants, office, retail
- Website: crownamericanassociates.com

Crown American is a privately held American company that manages and develops commercial real estate. The corporate headquarters is in downtown Johnstown, Pennsylvania, in a building designed by architect Michael Graves.

== History ==
=== 20th century ===
The company was founded in 1950 as Crown Construction. Frank J. Pasquerilla, who joined less than a year later, became president in 1956 and sole owner in 1961. The company's name was changed to Crown American in 1972 and in 1979, it acquired the Hess's department store chain. In 1993, the company split into two entities. The shopping mall portion of the company became a publicly held real estate investment trust, Crown American Realty Trust, and Crown American Hotels controlled the company's hospitality businesses. At its peak, Crown American operated 30 shopping malls, the Hess's department store chain (with 73 locations), and 20 hotels and motels. In 1999 Frank Pasquerilla had a stroke and died.

=== 21st century ===
In 2003, the shopping mall development and management unit, Crown American Realty Trust, was sold to * PREIT. The hospitality unit, Crown American Hotels, was retained. In 2005, 22 of the company's 26 hotels were acquired by W2001 Eastern Hotel Realty, an affiliate of the Archon Group, which assumed responsibility for their management. Frank's son, Mark E. Pasquerilla, serves as chairman of Crown American Hotels. He joined the company in 1981 and was named president in 1990. He is a graduate of the University of Notre Dame, completed a master of science degree in international relations at the London School of Economics, and studied international affairs at the University of Cologne. Michael Barletta is president and chief executive officer.

Pasquerilla Enterprises LP/Crown American Associates sold its last hotel, the Holiday Inn Express & Suites Johnstown, in May 2024. The Crown American Associates building was sold in December 2025 to 1st Summit Bank, and was the last Pasquerilla Enterprises LP property.

== List of former malls ==
Crown American has owned a total of 30 shopping malls during its history. When they merged with PREIT in 2003, they owned 26 malls, and were partners in one other. Crown American also owned a ground lease for an anchor pad at the Westgate Mall in Bethlehem, Pennsylvania, though they did not own the mall itself.

Mall name	Year opened	Year closed	Location	Owners
Carlisle Plaza Mall (Note: Now known as The Point at Carlisle Plaza)	1964		Carlisle, PA	Crown American 1969–2002; Michael Joseph Development Corp. 2002–2005; Cedar Realty Trust 2005–2012; Giant PA 2012–present
Logan Valley Mall	November 1965		Altoona, PA	Crown American 1965–2003; PREIT 2003–2017; Namdar Realty Group 2017–present
North Hanover Mall	1967		Hanover, PA	Crown American 1967–2003; PREIT 2003–2014; Namdar Realty Group 2014–present
Shenango Valley Mall	1967	May 31, 2024	Hermitage, PA	Crown American 1967–2003; PREIT 2003–2004; Lightstone 2004–2009; JSMN Shenango Valley Mall 2009–2018; Iowa Square Realty LLC 2018–2019; GFM 23 LLC 2019–2022; Butterfli Holdings LLC (FLICORE LLC) 2022–present
Nittany Mall	January 1968		State College, PA	Crown American 1968–2003; PREIT 2003–2014; Namdar Realty Group 2014–present
Viewmont Mall	1968		Scranton, PA	Crown American 1968–2003; PREIT 2003–present
Washington Crown Center	1969		Washington, PA	Crown American 1969–2003; PREIT 2003–2016; Kohan Retail Investment Group 2016–2025; PREP Funds/Industrial Realty Group 2025–present
Middletown Mall (Note: Now known as Middletown Commons)	1969		Fairmont, WV	Crown American 1969–1970; Crown American (50%) / First Union Real Estate Equity (50%) 1970–1995; Crown American 1995–1998; Dietrich Steven Fansler 1998–2018; General Acquisitions LLC 2018–present
Wyoming Valley Mall	1971		Wilkes-Barre, PA	Crown American 1971–1972; Crown American (50%) / First Union Real Estate Equity (50%) 1972–1995; Crown American 1995–2003; PREIT 2003–2019; GS Mortgage Securities Trust 2019–2021; Kohan Retail Investment Group 2021–2023; 4th Dimension Properties 2023–present
Uniontown Mall	1972		Uniontown, PA	Crown American 1972–2003; PREIT 2003–2015; Namdar Realty Group 2015–present
Palmer Park Mall	1973		Easton, PA	Crown American (50%) / PREIT (50%) 1973–2003; PREIT 2003–2016; CityView Commercial LLC 2016–present
Capital City Mall	1974		Camp Hill, PA	Crown American 1974–2003; PREIT 2003–present
Valley Mall	August 1974		Hagerstown, MD	Shopco Malls 1974–1989; ERE Yarmouth 1989–1997; Crown American 1997–2003; PREIT 2003–present
South Mall	1975		Allentown, PA	Hess's Department Stores, Inc. 1975–1979; Crown American 1979–2003; PREIT 2003–2014; Nicholas Park Mall, LLC. 2014–present
Francis Scott Key Mall	1978		Frederick, MD	Crown American 1978–2003; PREIT 2003–present
Lycoming Mall| (Note: Now known as The District at Lycoming Valley)	1978	February 24, 2023	Pennsdale, PA	Crown American 1978–2003; PREIT 2003–2016, Kohan Retail Investment Group 2016–2023, FamVest Partners LLC 2023–present
Valley View Mall	1980		La Crosse, WI	Equitable Life Insurance Society of the United States Unknown–2002; Crown American 2002–2003; PREIT 2003–Unknown; Kohan Retail Investment Group 2023–present
Schuylkill Mall	October 9, 1980	January 15, 2018	Frackville, PA	Crown American 1980–2003; PREIT 2003–2007; Empire Reality Investments 2007–2017; NP New Castle LLC 2017–2018
Crossroads Mall	1981		Beckley, WV	Beckley-Jacksonville Ltd. Partnership Unknown–1998; Crown American 1998–2003; PREIT 2003–2017; Namdar Realty Group 2017–present
Jacksonville Mall	1981		Jacksonville, NC	Beckley-Jacksonville Ltd. Partnership Unknown–1998; Crown American 1998–2003; PREIT 2003–present
West Manchester Mall (Note: Now known as West Manchester Town Center)	1981		York, PA	Crown American 1981–2003; PREIT 2003–2004; Lightstone 2004–2012; M&R Investors 2012–Unknown; ATR Corinth Partners Unknown–2022; Paramount Realty 2022–present
Chambersburg Mall	1982	June 2023	Scotland, PA	Crown American 1982–2003; PREIT 2003–2013; Namdar Realty Group 2013–present
Wiregrass Commons Mall	August 1986		Dothan, AL	Metropolitan Life Insurance Company Unknown–2002; Crown American 2002–2003; PREIT 2003–2016; Farallon Capital Management 2016–2018; Namdar Realty Group 2018–present
Patrick Henry Mall	1987		Newport News, VA	Crown American 1987–2003; PREIT 2003–present
New River Valley Mall (Note: Now known as Uptown Christiansburg)	1988		Christiansburg, VA	Crown American 1988–2003; PREIT 2003–2016; Farallon Capital Management 2016–2019; RockStep Capital 2019–present
Oak Ridge Mall (Note: Now known as Main Street Oak Ridge)	1989 (Note: Originally opened in the 1950's as an open-air shopping center before later being converted to an enclosed mall)	2016	Oak Ridge, TN	Crown American 1989–2003; Crown Investments Trust 2003; Oak Ridge City Center LLC 2003–2016; RealtyLink (TN Oak Ridge Rutgers LLC) 2016–present
Phillipsburg Mall	1989	2020	Phillipsburg, NJ	Crown American 1989–2003; PREIT 2003–2013; Namdar Realty Group 2013–present
Ashland Town Center	1989-10-04		Ashland, KY	Crown American 33% / Glimcher Realty 33% / Edward J. DeBartolo Corporation 33% 1989–Unknown; Glimcher Realty Unknown–2015; Washington Prime Group 2015–2025; CBL Properties 2025–present
Martinsburg Mall (Note: Now known as Foxcroft Towne Center at Martinsburg)	1991		Martinsburg, WV	Crown American 1991–2003; PREIT 2003–2004; Lightstone 2004–2009; Jones Lang LaSalle 2009–2010; Mountain State University 2010–2013; Paramount Developers 2013–present
Bradley Square Mall	1991		Cleveland, TN	Crown American 1991–2003; PREIT 2003–2004; Lightstone 2004–2009; The Shane Morrison Companies 2009–present
Mount Berry Square	1991		Rome, GA	Crown American 1991–2003; PREIT 2003–2004; Lightstone 2004–2009; Jones Lang LaSalle 2009–2012; Hull Property Group 2012–present
