= Main Street Oak Ridge =

Coordinates: 36.0120°N 84.2546°W

- Location: Oak Ridge, Tennessee, United States
- Opened: 1955 outdoor format (original mall), late 1980s enclosed (original mall) 2017 for (current outdoor shopp)
- Closed: 2016 (original mall)
- Manager: TN Oak Ridge Rutgers, LLC, Oak Ridge City Center, LLC (former)
- Owner: TN Oak Ridge Rutgers, LLC
- Num. of anchor tenants: 2
- Floors: 1

Main Street Oak Ridge, formerly known as Oak Ridge City Center and Oak Ridge Mall, is a mixed-use development in Oak Ridge, Tennessee. It was formerly constructed as a large indoor shopping mall.

== History ==
The site currently occupied by Oak Ridge City Center was selected by the U.S. Atomic Energy Commission to establish a permanent shopping center in the years following World War II. In 1951 the AEC selected a company headed by Guilford Glazer to build the new shopping center. A shortage of steel resulting from the Korean War delayed construction, but the Downtown Shopping Center opened in 1955. This shopping area was considered a replacement for the former "townsite" area around Jackson Square.

In the late 1980s Crown American purchased the property and converted it to an indoor mall by enclosing the walkways around the stores and significantly expanding the floor area.

RealtyLink, a South Carolina-based development company, purchased the former Oak Ridge Mall site on June 30, 2016, for $6.3 million. The new owner is TN Oak Ridge Rutgers LLC, a company established by RealtyLink for the development project. Plans by the developer call for replacing the former mall with Main Street Oak Ridge. This will be a 58-acre, $75 million mixed-use development property.

Demolition of the former Oak Ridge Mall began on the morning of Tuesday, July 26, 2016.

With the exception of anchor stores Belk and JCPenney, the former mall has been demolished, as of November 23, 2016. Dick's Sporting Goods opened in 2017 on the new property, which was renamed Main Street Oak Ridge.
