= Glosser Brothers/Gee Bee =

American discount store chain

Gee Bee
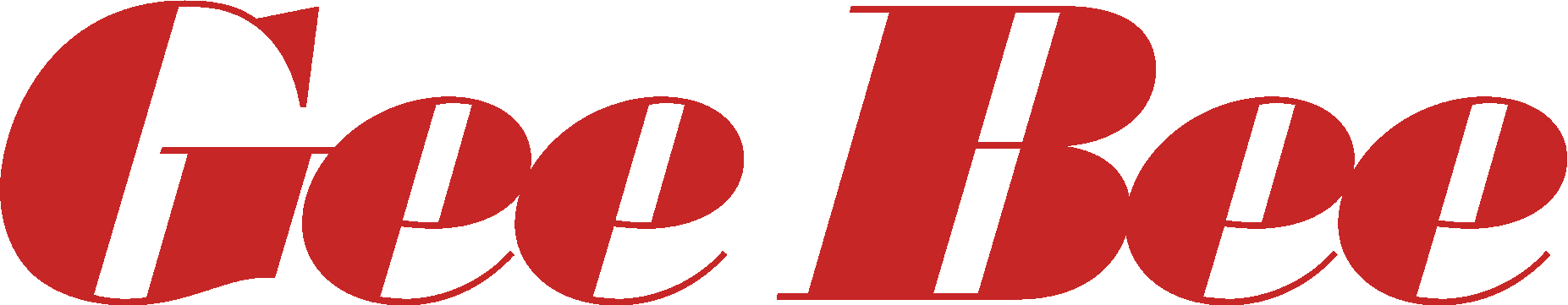
- Formerly: Glosser Brothers
- Type: Discount department store
- Industry: Retail
- Founded: 1906; 120 years ago (as Glosser Brothers)
- Defunct: 1993; 33 years ago
- Fate: Liquidation

Gee Bee Department Stores was a chain of discount department stores, mostly throughout western Pennsylvania. It was established as Glosser Brothers in 1906. The chain went out of business in 1993.

== History ==
The chain began as "Glosser Brothers" in Johnstown, Pennsylvania, United States, in 1906 when the Glosser brothers opened a small one-room shop in the Franklin Building. It branched out into a full-service, upscale department store carrying the company's name by the end of the decade. The Glossers were the ancestors of presidential advisor Stephen Miller, on his maternal side. Its founder, Louis W. Glosser, died in 1927.

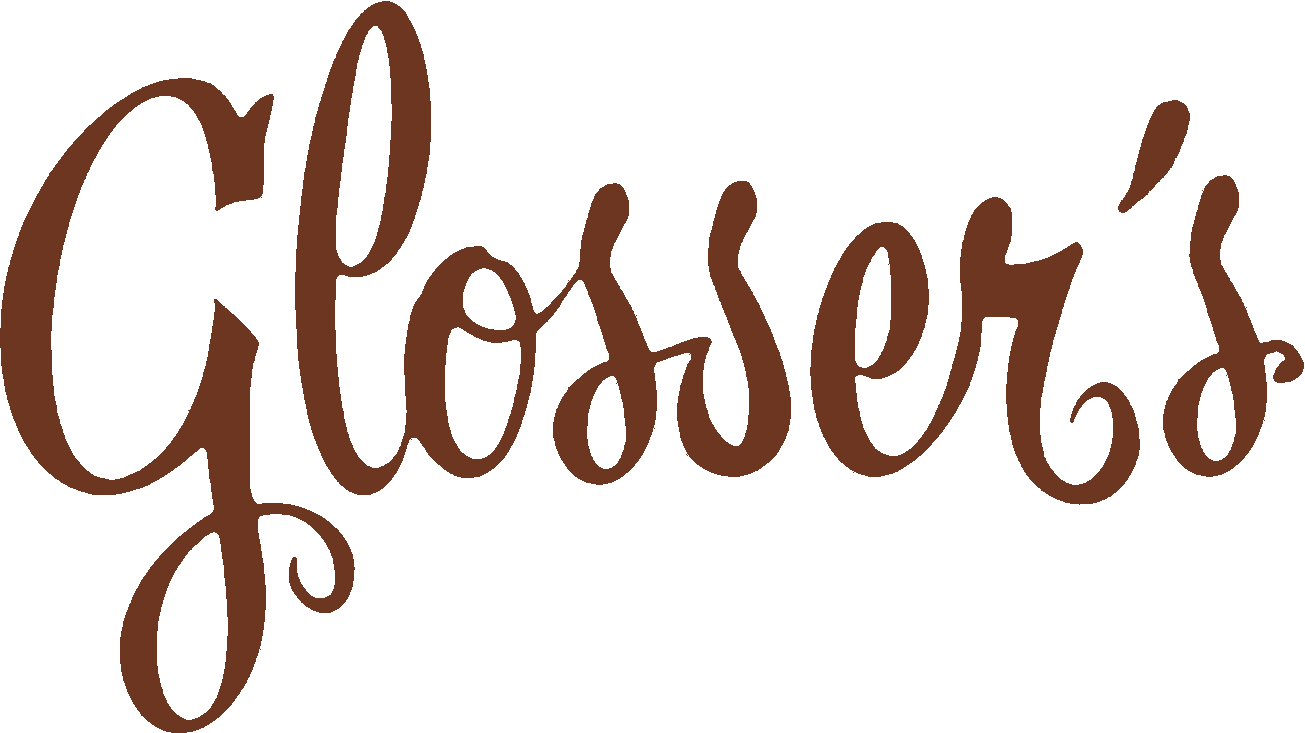
Glosser's logo

Glosser Brothers, or "Glosser's" for short, branched out in the 1960s with the opening of the suburban Gee Bee discount stores. Later in the 1970s, Gee Bee opened Gee Bee, Jr., a scaled-down concept of its full-sized discount stores, with the inventory concentrated on discount clothing and accessories. Some of the chain's larger locations also operated a co-branded supermarket co-located with the department store, but in a very separate location from it.

Most of the stores, including the original, which retained the full Glosser name, remained open into the early 1990s. The chain operated 23 stores in Pennsylvania, Maryland, Virginia, and West Virginia at its peak in the 1980s.

In 1989, the chain, feeling the pressure from the growing number of other discount retailers, was forced to declare bankruptcy, operating as GB Stores, Ltd. under receivership. The grocery division was closed as a result, with that business sold to other grocery retailers. The company successfully exited from bankruptcy in the summer of 1991.

After the Glosser Brothers company emerged from bankruptcy, it was put up for sale. It was purchased by Value City in May 1992, Many Gee Bee Stores were converted to the Value City format. The last Gee Bee Jr. store in Upper Yoder, Pennsylvania, a suburb of Johnstown, closed in 1993. Many of the rebranded Value City stores did not survive the transition, and were later closed by the end of the decade, with Value City itself shuttering in 2008.

The Franklin Building, the chain's corporate home for many years, was redeveloped in the mid-1990s. The Glosser Brothers Department Store, completed in 1905, is listed on the National Register of Historic Places as a contributing property to the Downtown Johnstown Historic District
