= PREIT =

U.S. real estate company

- Type: Private
- ISIN: US7091021078
- Industry: Real estate investment trust
- Founded: 1960; 66 years ago
- Founder: Sylvan M. Cohen
- Headquarters: Philadelphia, Pennsylvania, U.S.
- Key people: Jared Chupaila, CEO; Glenn Rufrano, Executive chairman
- Products: Shopping centers
- Website: preit.com

PREIT Realty (an initialism of its former name, Pennsylvania Real Estate Investment Trust) is a privately held company that owns and develops shopping centers, mostly in the Mid-Atlantic states.

== History ==
The company was founded by Sylvan M. Cohen (1914-2001) in 1960 following the passage of the Real Estate Investment Trust Act, which allowed real estate trusts to access money from public investment. In 1997, the company acquired The Rubin Organization for $260 million, and founder and chief executive officer Ronald Rubin became CEO of PREIT. In 2003, the company acquired six shopping malls from The Rouse Company. The company also acquired Crown American.

In 2012, Joseph Coradino was named chief executive officer of the company.

The company filed for Chapter 11 bankruptcy protection on November 1, 2020, and exited bankruptcy protection on December 11, 2020.

On December 10, 2023, PREIT once again filed for Chapter 11 bankruptcy protection. The company exited its bankruptcy proceedings in April 2024 as a private company under the ownership of its former lenders and appointed Jared Chupaila as CEO.

In Spring 2026, PREIT announced a redesigned website via a LinkedIn post alongside a new logo and rebrand to PREIT Realty.

== Portfolio ==
Notable properties owned by PREIT are as follows:

Mall	Location	Notes
Capital City Mall	Camp Hill, Pennsylvania	
Cherry Hill Mall	Cherry Hill, New Jersey	
Dartmouth Mall	Dartmouth, Massachusetts	
Francis Scott Key Mall	Frederick, Maryland	
Jacksonville Mall	Jacksonville, North Carolina	
Lehigh Valley Mall	Whitehall, Pennsylvania	50% ownership with Simon Property Group. Simon manages the mall.
Magnolia Mall	Florence, South Carolina	
Moorestown Mall	Moorestown, New Jersey	
Patrick Henry Mall	Newport News, Virginia	
Plymouth Meeting Mall	Plymouth Meeting, Pennsylvania	
Springfield Town Center	Springfield, Virginia	
The Mall at Prince George's	Hyattsville, Maryland	
Valley Mall	Hagerstown, Maryland	
Viewmont Mall	Scranton/Dickson City, Pennsylvania	
Woodland Mall	Grand Rapids, Michigan	
