= Pittsburgh Mills =

Dead mall in Frazer Township, Pennsylvania, U.S.

Galleria at Pittsburgh Mills

- Neighborhood 2 concourse (October 2025)
- Location: Tarentum, Pennsylvania, U.S.
- Coordinates: 40°34′16″N 79°47′52″W
- Address: 590 Pittsburgh Mills Circle
- Opened: July 14, 2005; 21 years ago
- Previous names: Frazer Heights Galleria (planning, c. 1981–2002)
- Developer: The Mills Corporation; Zamias Services, Inc.; KanAm Group
- Manager: Mason Asset Management
- Owner: Namdar Realty Group; Comstock Holding Companies
- Num. of stores: 20+
- Num. of anchor tenants: 6 (2 open, 4 vacant)
- Floor area: 905,667 square feet (84,139 m^{2})
- Floors: 1 (2 in former Macy's)
- Public transit: WCTA bus: 14J
- Website: www.pittsburghmills.com
- Building details
- SportStreet Entry 3 (April 2021)

General information
- Status: Operational
- Construction started: April 2003; 23 years ago
- Completed: 2005

The Galleria at Pittsburgh Mills, or simply Pittsburgh Mills, is a super-regional shopping mall northeast of Pittsburgh, Pennsylvania in Frazer Township, Allegheny County, along PA Route 28 near its intersection with the Pennsylvania Turnpike.

Initially intended to be a prominent retail center for the Allegheny Valley with 905,667 ft^{2} (84,139 m^{2}) of retail space on 200 acres (0.8 km^{2}), the grand opening of Pittsburgh Mills was on July 14, 2005. It is the only Mills-branded mall in the United States that was not part of the Simon Property Group acquisition of the Mills Corporation in April 2007. As of 2026, due to mismanagement and high vacancy rates, Pittsburgh Mills has over 20 stores remaining. Namdar Realty Group has no plans for redevelopment, though they are considering to sell the mall to Comstock Holding Companies. Besides Namdar, the mall ultimately failed due to being located in an oversaturated market, which led to low tenant signups; planning for Pittsburgh Mills dates back to the early 1980s as Frazer Heights Galleria, which was stalled for over 20 years for similar problems.

== Overview ==
Pittsburgh Mills was conceived and originally developed by the Mills Corporation, which is now part of Simon Property Group.

As of April 2007, Pittsburgh Mills is the only Mills-branded mall that is neither owned nor managed by Simon in the United States. Pittsburgh Mills was also the last Mills mall developed in the U.S., and the first Landmark Mills property to feature traditional retail rather than outlet stores.

The mall is divided into five themed neighborhoods corresponding to various Pittsburgh landmarks and cultural icons. One lap around the entire mall is about one mile in length, making it a popular spot for mall walkers.

== History ==
=== 1981–2005: Development and opening ===
Entrance 1 and parking lot (April 2021)

In 1981, George D. Zamias announced plans for a $50 million shopping center in Frazer Township, with over 300 acres (120 ha) near PA Route 28 being rezoned for commercial use. The mall was planned to be called Frazer Heights Galleria. Due to a "sluggish economy", Zamias announced in June 1983 that construction of the mall would be delayed until the fall of 1984.

However, the mall was delayed again due to the steel crisis, and it was announced in July 1986 that the project would be abandoned. Damian Zamias stated in October 1987 that the mall was ready to resume development and begin construction, now at a cost of $80 million. This was once again stalled in the summer of 1988, when PennDOT announced that the proposed $35 million Route 28 interchange needed for the mall site was not on its 12-year construction plan. Without a highway, the mall could not even exist in the first place, and vice versa. George Zamias resolved this and announced that the mall would break ground in October 1989, now at a cost of $100 million.

In winter 1991, an anti-mall group known as Citizens for Frazer Township tried to block the project even further. Members argued that the land for the project was a protected wetland, and should not be destroyed for commercial use. They strongly opposed the use of public funds for the project, specifically the $58 million in taxpayer money used for the mall's surrounding infrastructure and the dedicated State Route 28 interchange. The group also fought to preserve the "once peaceful countryside" of Frazer Township, viewing the massive 1.1-million-square-foot (100,000 m^{2}) complex as an "atrocity" of urban sprawl. They accurately predicted that the Alle-Kiski Valley could not financially support a project of that scale, especially given the proximity to the established Monroeville Mall and Ross Park Mall. TribLive stated in a 2024 article that Pittsburgh Mills "should've never been built".

In April 1992, Zamias announced that he plans to create his own municipality, called Frazer Heights Borough. His goal was to "secede" the mall's 300 acres (120 ha)+ from the township to gain control over his own zoning and tax laws, effectively bypassing the local government that was fighting him. However, the courts ultimately denied his request for an injunction to stop the township from repealing ordinances favorable to his project, which the township officials viewed as yet another "hurdle" in a process that had already dragged on for over 10 years. Zamias disagreed and made the following statement:

I think the ruling is totally unrelated to anything that happens in the future. I'm still pursuing the tack of borough and corporation to save my project.

— George D. Zamias, founder of Zamias Services, Inc.

In December 1997, Zamias announced that the mall would be operational in time for Christmas 2000. Later, in February 1999, potential tenants have pledged to lease more than half the space at the planned mall. However, Frazer Heights Galleria was delayed once again when Zamias Services, Inc. of Johnstown filed for Chapter 11 bankruptcy in May 2001. Damian and George Zamias promised that the project would not be canceled. In June 2002, the Arlington, Virginia-based Mills Corporation, alongside KanAm, a German-based firm, announced that it was nearing an agreement with the Zamiases, promising that the mall, now planned as the Galleria at Pittsburgh Mills, would begin construction within one year later. The mall would now cost $285 million, and site work for the project began in April 2003.

In November 2003, a tax-financing deal for Pittsburgh Mills was approved by local and county governments, with a value of $17.9 million over the next 20 years. The deal would divert 75% of the new property tax revenue from the project to pay for infrastructure improvements in the area. Pittsburgh Mills finally opened its doors to the public on July 14, 2005, after more than 20 years being stuck on the drawing board. It was the first Landmark Mills property to feature two full-price department stores—JCPenney and Kaufmann's, along with a Sears Grand store. Unlike other Landmark Mills malls, Pittsburgh Mills offered a mix of outlet and general shopping, rather than being synonymous with outlet stores. As part of Mills' partnership with PBS, their third PBS Kids Backyard would debut at opening.

=== 2006–2026: Problems, decline ===
Unfinished NASCAR SpeedPark entrance (April 2021)

NASCAR SpeedPark was originally planned to open at the mall near Dick's Sporting Goods, but this was canceled in late February 2006 due to financial struggles and the withdrawal of the Mills Corporation, leading to the then-under construction space to remain permanently unfinished. Despite opening to much fanfare in 2005, the mall would never see the success that its owners had hoped. Only a year after opening, Lucky Strike Lanes closed on August 27, 2006, and was eventually replaced with two restaurants—Dingbats and Abate Seafood—as well as a banquet hall. The May Department Stores Company, which owned Kaufmann's, was acquired by Federated Department Stores in September 2006, and the mall's Kaufmann's was converted to Macy's.

Lawsuits by the Securities & Exchange Commission (SEC) and the Mills Corp.'s own founder, Herbert S. Miller, revealed that Pittsburgh Mills was built in an oversaturated market, causing it to suffer from extremely low tenant signups, which forced it into a "soft opening" stage. Due to its financial struggles, Mills sold its shares in the mall to Zamias Services, Inc. on December 30, 2006. On July 30, 2008, Linens 'n Things announced that it would close as part of a nationwide plan to shutter 170 stores, while Zamias announced that a new restaurant, SAWA Japanese Steakhouse, would debut near Entrance 2.

On July 19, 2011, Borders Books and Music announced that it would close the Shoppes at Northway and Pittsburgh Mills locations as part of the liquidation of its U.S. bookstores and after filing for Chapter 11 bankruptcy. Starting in 2014, non-traditional businesses began occupying space in the mall, including real estate offices, armed forces recruiters, pharmacy and medical supply outlets, and fitness clubs. Sears Grand permanently closed its doors on January 19, 2015, due to a failure to directly compete with Walmart and Target, and lack of regional foot traffic.

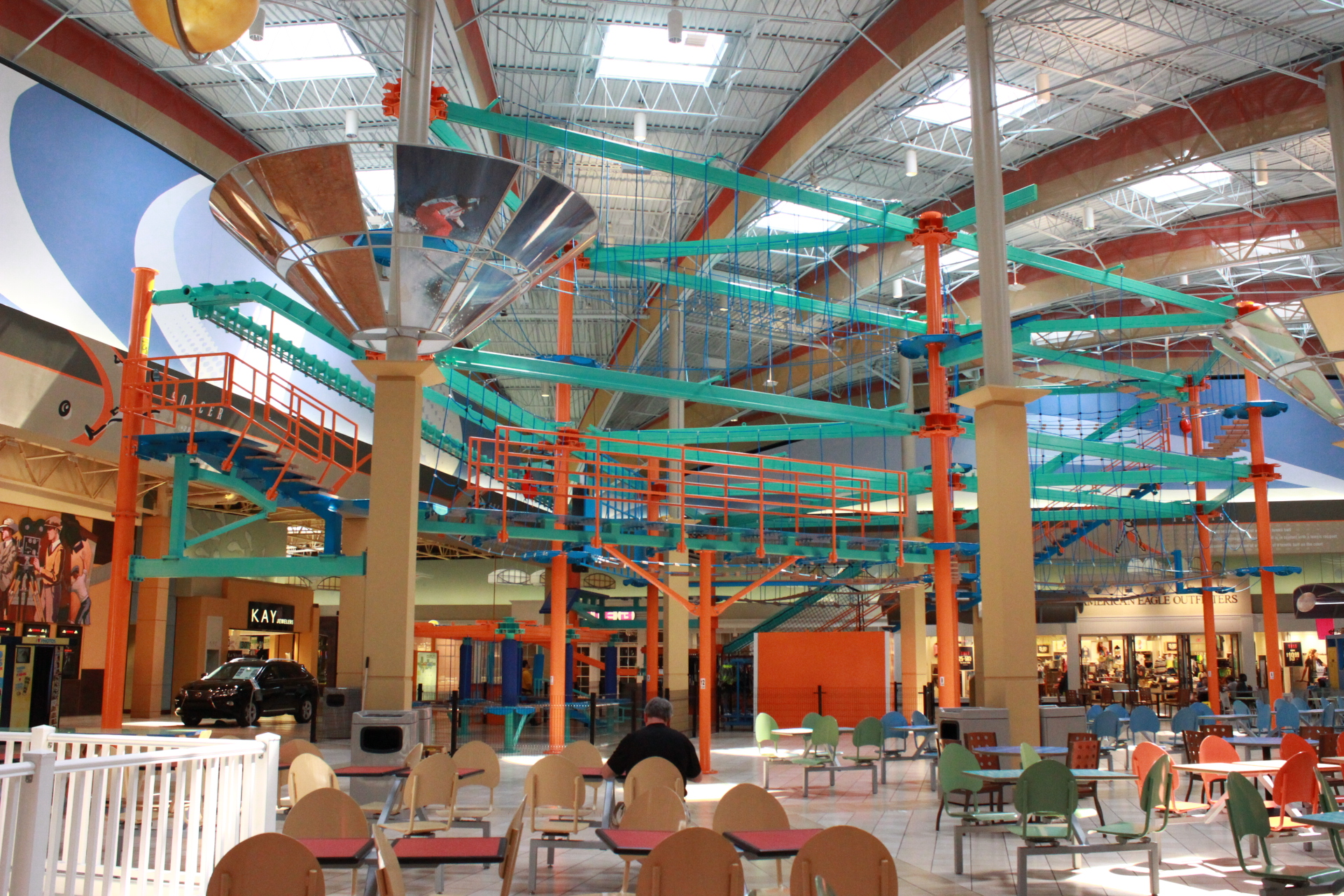
Sky Trail in April 2015, which has been removed as of October 2017

In mid-April 2015, Zamias Services constructed a Sky Trail that occupied a corner of the food court that was previously was the site of a carousel and a staging area for small pageants and school band concerts, in hopes of generating entertainment and business.

One of the largest non-traditional tenants, ITT Technical Institute, closed its location at Pittsburgh Mills in September 2016, following financial struggles and lawsuits of the company. As part of a foreclosure sale in January 2017, the mall was auctioned to the holder of the mortgage on the property, Wells Fargo, for $100, and the Sky Trail was closed and dismantled in October 2017. In 2018, Pittsburgh Mills was acquired by Namdar Realty Group and its partner, Mason Asset Management, for $11 million. Namdar has a reputation for being a "retail slumlord" that skips maintenance and paying taxes. Macy's would not be included in the sale, as it was separately owned.

Pittsburgh Mills closed temporarily on March 17, 2020, due to the COVID-19 pandemic. In May 2020, Cinemark Theaters announced that the 17-screen Pittsburgh Mills movie theater, operating as Cinemark Galleria at Pittsburgh Mills and IMAX, would not reopen after the nationwide economic shutdown caused by the pandemic. On June 4, 2020, JCPenney announced that it would close its Pittsburgh Mills store by around October 2020 as part of a plan to close 154 stores nationwide, leaving Macy's as the last traditional anchor. In January 2021, Goodrich Quality Theaters announced that they would reopen the former Cinemark in spring 2021. In November 2021, online returns liquidator M@C Discount announced a major expansion into Pittsburgh Mills, leasing the massive, former 165,000 sq ft (15,300 m^{2}) Sears Grand space.

Announced in late September 2023, Namdar was $11.5 million delinquent on taxes, which, if not paid by October 2, 2023, would result in a sheriff's sale of most of the property parcels. On September 29, 2023, Namdar paid the back taxes, and the sheriff's sale was canceled. In September 2024, Panera Bread was preparing to relocate from the mall to the nearby Village at Pittsburgh Mills shopping plaza. Macy's was listed for sale in April 2025, with plans to close by the end of Q1 2026. JoAnn Fabrics closed in May 2025 due to the chain filing for bankruptcy. On June 8, 2025, Dick's Sporting Goods closed their store at the mall, planning to relocate to the Waterworks Shopping Plaza. In July 2025, Namdar Realty Group began considerations to sell the mall. Bath & Body Works shuttered on October 3, 2025, leaving Pittsburgh Mills without any national inline tenants.

==== Maintenance issues ====
Former food court (October 2025)

Vacant storefronts in Neighborhood 1, with former JoAnn Fabrics on the right, as viewed in October 2025.

As of January 2026, Namdar Realty Group faces nearly $29 million in total fines for hundreds of code violations resulting from leaving broken infrastructure unaddressed.

Frazer Township officials reported that the roads surrounding Pittsburgh Mills have been described as a "moonscape", featuring potholes up to three feet wide and one foot deep. These craters have caused extensive vehicle damage and hindered emergency responders, leading to criminal "public nuisance" charges in April 2025 by the Allegheny County District Attorney. Lowe's, Walmart, and its membership-only division, Sam's Club, sent Namdar a cease-and-desist letter that forced Pitt Realty, a legal affiliate of Namdar, to repair the property within 30 days. When this request was ignored, Walmart, Sam's Club, and Lowe's sued Namdar over road conditions in June 2025, and the company was fined for nearly $2 million after pleading guilty and facing hundreds of code citations that Namdar has attempted to appeal in late August 2025.

Inside and around the mall, Bill Payne and other inspectors documented 364 specific violations, including:

- Defective doors, with at least 68 found to be rusting or shut.
- Crumbling sidewalks, stairs, and pillars.
- Broken drainage, with areas near anchor stores suffering from improper grading, leading to stagnant water.

Even the floor has been neglected, with overgrown weeds and grass (some knee-high) consistently blanketing the exterior, contributing to the appearance of an abandoned mall. On January 8, 2026, Macy's announced that it would be closing as part of a plan to close 14 stores nationwide by the end of Q1 2026, which would leave the mall with M@C Discount and GQT as its two remaining anchors, further cementing its status as a dead mall. Namdar acquired the former Macy's building in mid-February 2026. As of April 2026, there are about 20 stores left in the mall. The food court—which once housed two full-service restaurants, a Starbucks location, eight counter restaurants, and several push-cart vendors—is completely vacant. Announced on April 12, 2026, the 173,000 sq ft (16,100 m^{2}) Macy's would close on April 26.

By September 17, 2026, Namdar began paving over the public-facing ring and mall access roads, including Pittsburgh Mills Circle, Value Drive, Retail Drive, Fashion Drive, Mills Drive, and Pittsburgh Mills Boulevard. On September 25, 2026, it was announced that the property was in contingency to be sold to an unknown developer. By this point, it was reported that the parking lot would be largely empty throughout the day, and the only business attracting customers was a temporary Spirit Halloween store. One shopper stated that Pittsburgh Mills "feels empty", and also "feels like a ghost town". As of November 2026, the AHN Citizens School of Nursing operates at the mall.

=== 2026–present: Sale and future redevelopment ===
On November 3, 2026, it was officially confirmed that Comstock Holding Companies of Reston, Virginia, a developer associated with data centers, entered into a pending contract agreement to purchase the Galleria at Pittsburgh Mills, the surrounding road infrastructure, and the former Macy's building from Namdar. Comstock Holding stated that redevelopment plans would be unveiled to the Frazer Township Board in the "first half of 2027".

== The Village at Pittsburgh Mills ==
An adjacent, 149,628-square-foot (13,900.9 m^{2}) strip plaza called The Village at Pittsburgh Mills is located near the main Galleria portion of the complex, designed by MCG Architecture. The contractor was Fortney & Weygandt, Inc.

It was purchased on December 16, 2021, by First National Realty Partners of New Jersey. Since then, The Village has been performing better than the main mall, with 93% occupancy as it was anchored by Aldi, OfficeMax, Famous Footwear, Ross Dress for Less, PetSmart, Michaels, and Five Below, alongside dining options such as Applebee's.

== Gallery ==
Macy's entrance (April 2021)

Entrance to Neighborhood 2 (April 2021)

Boarded JCPenney entrance (April 2021)

Former PBS Kids Backyard (October 2025)

GQT Pittsburgh Mills Cinemas entrance (April 2021)

Former Cinemark (March 2020)

== See also ==
- List of largest shopping malls in the United States
- Retail apocalypse
- St. Louis Mills and Marley Station Mall, also neglected by Namdar Realty Group
