= Richland Mall =

Richland Mall can refer to:

- Richland Mall (Ohio), in Mansfield, Ohio
- Richland Mall (South Carolina) in Columbia, South Carolina
- Richland Mall (Texas) in Waco, Texas
- Richland Mall, a defunct mall in Quakertown, Pennsylvania
- Richland Town Center, formerly Richland Mall, in Johnstown, Pennsylvania
- Richlands Mall, in Richlands, Virginia
