= Diamond Run Mall =

Shopping mall in Rutland, Vermont, US

- Location: Rutland, Vermont, U.S.
- Coordinates: 43.5807°N 72.9638°W
- Address: 46 Diamond Run Mall Place
- Opened: August 1995
- Closed: October 2019
- Developer: Zamias Services, Inc.
- Manager: Zamias Services, Inc.
- Num. of stores: 60+
- Num. of anchor tenants: 3
- Floor area: 445,000 square feet (41,300 m^{2})
- Floors: 1

Diamond Run Mall was an enclosed shopping mall serving Rutland, Vermont, United States, the state’s third largest municipality. Opened in 1995, it was the second mall in the community after the Rutland Mall. Despite initial success, the mall was hampered by financial issues through its developer and owner, Zamias Services, Inc. as well as fees and restrictions from the local government. At its peak, the mall featured over 60 stores, with J. C. Penney, Sears, and Kmart as the anchor stores. The mall declined severely in tenancy throughout the Great Recession, and ultimately closed in October 2019.

== History ==
In 1986, Damian Zamias of Zamias Services, Inc. would purchase 92 acres of land at the southern end of Rutland Town. The following year, the town made changes to its municipal plan that would allow the land to be developed into a mall, and Zamias had his first meeting with Rutland Mayor Jeffrey Wennberg.

Zamias first applied for an Act 250 land use permit to build a mall in Rutland, Vermont in 1988. While the permit was approved in 1989, the mall development was held up for many years afterward. Factors in the delay included acquisition of a federal wetlands permit, and a lack of financing stemming from difficulty in finding investors. In addition, Zamias sought a $6.2 million credit from the city of Rutland for making agreements to relocate Kmart from downtown Rutland City to the mall and move Central Vermont Public Service offices into their former location. City of Rutland officials later compromised on the credit and agreed to pay Zamias $4 million on the condition that Zamias also pay impact fees to the city over the next 15 years. After securing a $38 million construction loan, Zamias finally began construction in April 1994.

By September 1994, Zamias had confirmed that the mall would consist of over 445,000 square feet (41,300 m^{2}) of retail space. In addition to Kmart, the other anchor stores would be J. C. Penney and Sears, and the mall would feature more than 60 stores. Zamias Services held a contest for locals to offer a name for the mall, and chose the name Diamond Run Mall in November 1994. Representatives thought that the name was fitting, given the prevalence of skiing in the area.

Diamond Run Mall held a ribbon-cutting ceremony and opened its first twelve stores on August 23, 1995. Alongside J. C. Penney, Sears, and Kmart, the inline stores opened on that day were Barbara Moss clothing store, Gap, County Seat, Claire's, Regis and MasterCuts hair salons, GNC, Olympia Sports, and Sbarro. The mall's interior decor was themed after the summertime, with various paintings of butterflies, birds, kites, and flowers suspended from the ceiling. By the official grand opening in October, other stores that had opened included Payless ShoeSource, Yankee Candle, Disney Store, Eddie Bauer, National Record Mart, and RadioShack. The mall's opening had an impact on Rutland Mall, an existing shopping center on the other side of Rutland. Many of its inline stores had moved to Diamond Run, including National Record Mart, Regis, GNC, Lauriat Books, and Hallmark Cards.

By December 1997, Diamond Run Mall had still not been fully leased, and the city of Rutland had sued Zamias for $100,000 over not paying the first installment of its impact fees. The city of Rutland reassessed the mall's value in October 1998, and noted that Zamias' payments of property taxes had been on time after the initial taxes from 1995 had been delinquent. Despite this, the lawsuit over the unpaid impact fees remained open at the time. Then-mayor John Cassarino negotiated a payment plan toward the impact fees by January 2003, and noted that the funds had been used by the city of Rutland for sidewalk and streetlight improvement in the city.

=== 21st century ===
An ice rink called Rutland Regional Field was built behind the mall in 2004. Five years after its opening it was purchased by Castleton State College and renamed Spartan Arena. Old Navy opened at the mall in 2005, boosting mall occupancy above 90 percent. Despite this, many mall stores began to close over the next several years as their leases expired. These included Payless ShoeSource and Ritz Camera. In addition, Gap closed due to the presence of Old Navy, which it also owned at the time. However, the mall's occupancy remained above the national average, and several new stores opened including a locally owned restaurant near Old Navy. The original plans for the mall called for a full-service restaurant to have opened off the food court, but mall developers instead used the space for a Rex TV and Appliance store after failing to find a suitable restaurant chain. In addition, a covered walkway was built to connect the ice arena to the mall.

Diamond Run Mall saw a sharp decline in tenancy throughout the 21st century. It was sold in 2007 to Gemini Real Estate, and again in 2014 to BAI Rutland. At the time of the sale, the mall had declined to less than 50% occupancy. Zamias continued to serve as manager under BAI Rutland's ownership, and noted that the decline in tenancy during Gemini's ownership was likely due to the Great Recession. By 2014, mall vacancy continued to increase, with many tenants claiming that rents were too high. This was followed later in the year by an announcement that Sears would close. J. C. Penney closed one year later and was replaced by LaFlamme's Furniture, which also closed in 2017. Kmart closed in April 2018, leaving the mall without an anchor store.

Zamias announced in mid-2019 that the mall would close by year's end and would be torn down for a new shopping center. At the time of this announcement, Zamias still owed over $50,000 in unpaid impact fees. The last businesses moved out or closed in October 2019, and mall assets were auctioned off a month later.

=== Future ===
In 2024, the owner of the mall, Zamias, announced plans to the Rutland Select Board to demolish the mall and build a 170,995 square foot Walmart Supercenter with a potential expansion of the Spartan Arena, a hotel, and extra tenants. The existing Walmart on Plaza Road will close following the opening of the new Supercenter.
