= Lincoln–Lemington–Belmar =

- Neighborhood of Pittsburgh
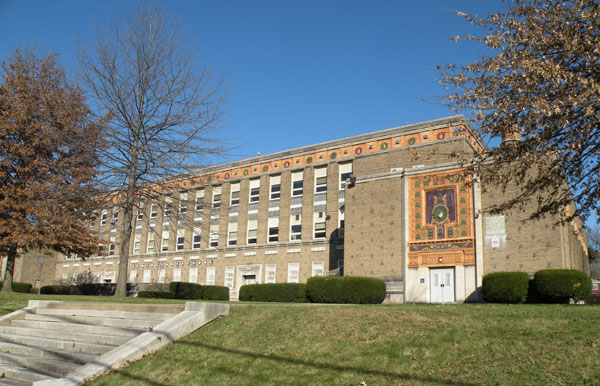
- Lemington Elementary School

- Coordinates: 40.469°N 79.896°W
- Country: United States
- State: Pennsylvania
- County: Allegheny County
- City: Pittsburgh

Area
  - Total: 1.812 sq mi (4.69 km^{2})

Population (2010)
  - Total: 4,883
  - Density: 2,695/sq mi (1,040/km^{2})

Lincoln–Lemington–Belmar is a neighborhood in Pittsburgh, Pennsylvania. It is located in the northeastern section of the city and spans the Allegheny River. Lincoln–Lemington–Belmar houses PBF 15 Engine, and is covered by PBP Zone 5 and the Bureau of EMS Medic 1.

Lincoln and Lemington were former neighborhoods in the northeastern section of the city. Lincoln–Lemington–Belmar is a predominantly black neighborhood that was once a white neighborhood from the early 1920s until the early 1970s. Belmar was a neighborhood atop a steep hill that overlooked the city on Vann Road and Tilden Street.

Lincoln–Lemington–Belmar is generally subdivided at Lemington Ave into two parts, "Upper Lincoln" and "Lower Lincoln".

Lincoln–Lemington–Belmar is one of the steepest neighborhoods in Pittsburgh, with Downtown Pittsburgh (8 miles (13 km) away) visible from many parts of Upper Lincoln.

The Veterans Hospital and the Shuman Juvenile Detention Center are located off Highland Drive in the northern part of the neighborhood. Larimer borders Lincoln–Lemington–Belmar to the west and is connected by the Lincoln Avenue Bridge and the Larimer Avenue Bridge. Homewood borders Lincoln–Lemington–Belmar to the south and is connected by Upland Street, Apple Avenue off Lincoln Avenue, and by Stranahan Avenue from atop Belmar. Penn Hills lies east of Lincoln–Lemington–Belmar, and is reached via Lincoln and Lemington avenues, and also by Brushton Avenue streaming in from Homewood. Highland Park is separated by Washington Boulevard to the west. Part of the neighborhood extends across the Allegheny River. Lincoln–Lemington contains the Waterworks Mall and St. Margaret Hospital, which is part of the UPMC health system.

== Surrounding neighborhoods ==
The section north of the Allegheny River has three borders: Aspinwall to the west, Fox Chapel to the north and O'Hara Township to the east. Its larger counterpart south of the river has five borders, including Penn Hills to the east and the Pittsburgh neighborhoods of Homewood North and Homewood West to the south, Larimer to the southwest and Highland Park to the west.

== City steps ==
The Lincoln–Lemington–Belmar neighborhood has 8 distinct flights of city steps, most of which are open and in a reasonably safe condition. In Lincoln–Lemington–Belmar, the Steps of Pittsburgh connect pedestrians to public transportation and provide a way to travel through the hilly neighborhood.

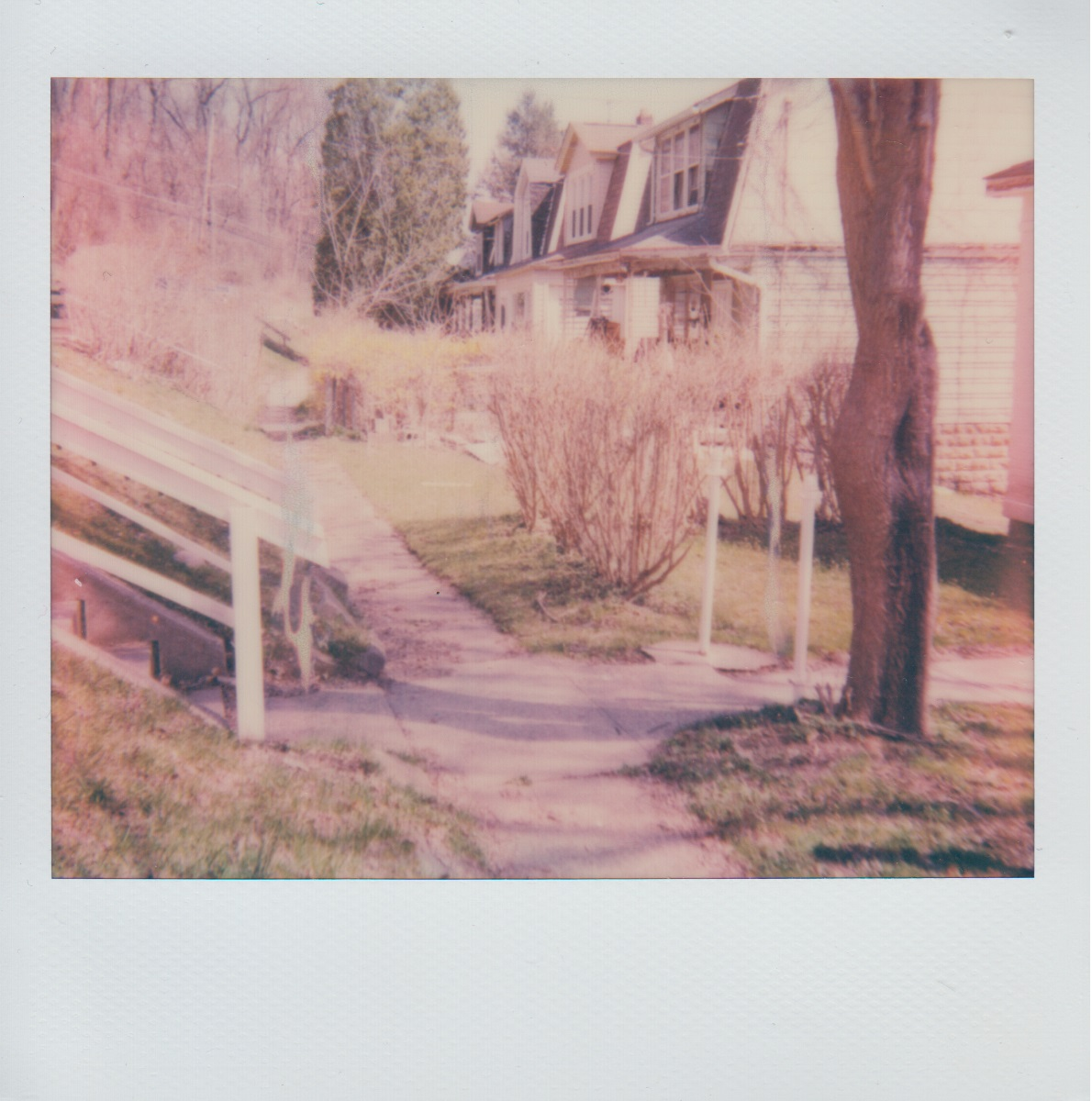
The Broadcrest Drive sidewalk steps in Lincoln–Lemington–Belmar

== See also ==
- List of Pittsburgh neighborhoods
