= McCandless Crossing =

- Phase four as of March 2014
- Location: McCandless, Pennsylvania, United States
- Coordinates: 40.56770°N 80.02424°W
- Opened: 2010 (partial); 2016 (complete)
- Developer: AdVenture Development
- Manager: ECHO Retail; Jones Lang LaSalle
- Num. of stores: 40+
- Num. of anchor tenants: 5
- Floor area: 1,000,000 square feet (93,000 m^{2})
- Floors: 1 (some anchors feature multiple levels)
- Public transit: Port Authority bus: 12, O12
- Website: mccandlesscrossing.com

McCandless Crossing is an open-air lifestyle center in McCandless, Pennsylvania, about 10 miles north of Pittsburgh. The $100 million development was completed in late 2016.

== History ==
The mixed-use project opened partially in 2010 with the completion of the first phase, which includes a Lowe's Home Improvement store and smaller shops. As of 2013, phases two and three were completed including a Hilton Home2 hotel, an LA Fitness, and a day care center.

The fourth phase, which includes a 250,000 square feet (23,000 m^{2}) town center, started development in 2013 with the construction of three anchor stores: Dick's Sporting Goods, Cinemark Theatres, and HomeGoods. The project was expected to partially open in early 2014 with the opening of the three anchor stores, with the completion scheduled for autumn of 2014. The fourth phase includes 53 townhomes, developed by Ryan Homes.

On January 30, 2014, it was announced that the work on McCandless Crossing would extend into 2016 due to harsh winter weather conditions delaying progress.

Dick's Sporting Goods became the first completed business of phase four and opened on April 9, 2014, replacing the previous Shoppes at Northway location. In early 2024, Dick's Sporting Goods moved back to Ross Township, replacing the not defunct Sears anchor store in Ross Park Mall with Dick's House of Sport. The Cinemark movie theater opened in September 2014, with various restaurants and retailers opening in July and August 2014.

In 2016, the development was mostly completed and near capacity as numerous restaurants and retailers moved in. A Fairfield by Marriott hotel opened in 2017, and a 10-bed Allegheny Health Network hospital opened in 2020. A proposed 4-story office tower called McCandless Town Center remains unbuilt.

== Development ==
The project is being developed by AdVenture Development, a development firm based in Selma, North Carolina. The project consists of four phases each occupying a section of the 130-acre site. The first phase opened in 2010 with a Lowe's Home Improvement store, the second in 2011 with an LA Fitness, and the third in 2013 with a Hilton Home2 hotel. The fourth phase was expected to partially open in spring of 2014.

The development has been a part of a local boom in assisted living and senior housing construction, with two developments located in McCandless Crossing.

== Anchor stores ==
- Cinemark Theatres – 41,705 square feet (3,874.5 m^{2})
- HomeGoods – 25,095 square feet (2,331.4 m^{2})
- LA Fitness
- Lowe's Home Improvement
- Old Navy
