= Richmond Town Square =

Defunct mall in Cuyahoga County, Ohio, U.S.

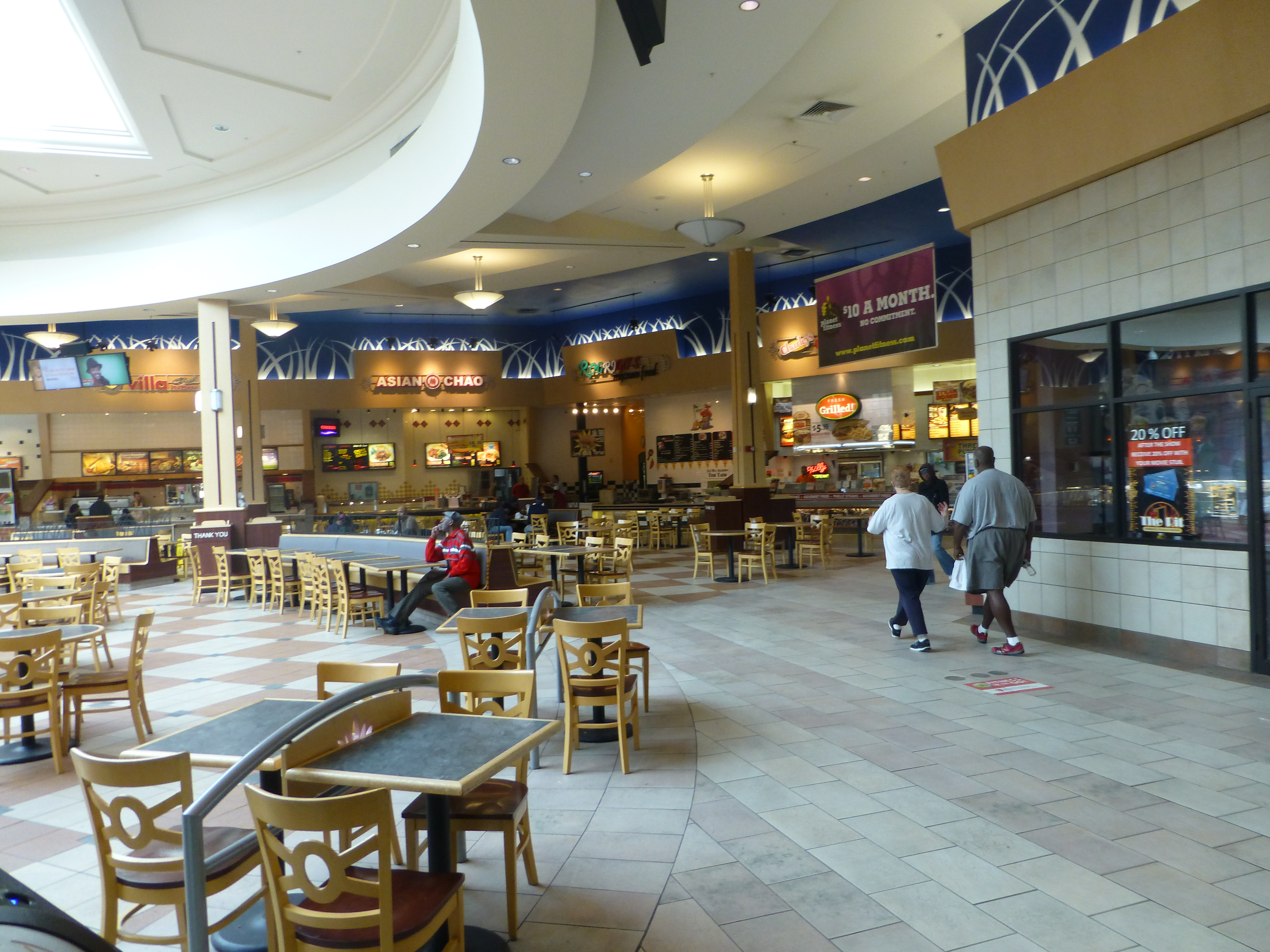
- The mall's food court in February 2013
- Location: Richmond Heights, Ohio
- Coordinates: 41°32′29.4″N 81°29′39.3″W
- Address: 691 Richmond Road
- Opened: September 22, 1966; 60 years ago
- Closed: May 6, 2021; 5 years ago
- Developer: Edward J. DeBartolo Corporation
- Owner: DealPoint Merrill
- Num. of stores: 75+ at peak
- Num. of anchor tenants: 3 at peak
- Floor area: 1,017,000
- Floors: 1 (2 in Anchors)
- Public transit: RTA
- Website: shoprichmondtownsquare.com

Richmond Town Square was a super-regional shopping mall known locally as 'Richmond' or 'Richmond Mall', located in Richmond Heights, Ohio, a suburb of Cleveland, at the intersection of Richmond Road and Wilson Mills Road. It opened on September 22, 1966 as Richmond Mall, and was developed by mall developer Edward J. DeBartolo Sr. Original anchors were Sears and JCPenney, alongside a Loews Theater and Woolworths. The mall included in-line tenants such as Richman Brothers and Winkelman's.

== Mall features ==
The Richmond Town Square Branch of the Cuyahoga County Public Library opened in the mall in 1988. Originally housed in a freestanding boutique kiosk, the branch showed significant circulation growth. The kiosk was forced to close in August 1998 due to a major renovation of the mall, but the branch library reopened in September 1999 in a 1,200-square-foot (110 m^{2}) location by the northeast mall entrance, next to Sears.

== History ==
The Richmond Town Square opened in September 1966 as Richmond Mall. In 1997, Woolworths closed its store at the mall. In 1998, Kaufmann's was added to the mall as an anchor, originally located at the Euclid Square Mall in Euclid, Ohio, the anchor changes included the expansion of the Loews Theater from a 10-screen theater to a 20-screen theater, and the addition a junior-anchor, Barnes & Noble. Also in 1998, DeBartolo Realty Corp. merged with Simon Property Group, and in the same year Simon remodeled the mall, expanded it, and renamed it. This renovation took advantage of new and emerging technologies "in materials, as well as architectural and decorative innovations" The total cost of the renovation was reported as US$100 million.

In 2006, Kaufmann's was rebranded to Macy's as a part of the Federated–May merger. Also in 2006, the Loews Theater was rebranded to Regal Cinemas. In 2010, the Barnes & Noble store at the mall closed as a round of closures by the company. In 2012, Planet Fitness opened a fitness center in the building. On May 28, 2014, it was revealed that Richmond Town Square was one of two malls along with Great Lakes Mall in northeast Ohio that would have its ownership transferred from Simon Property Group to its spin-off Washington Prime Group (which is now known as WP Glimcher). In January 2015, Macy's announced the store at the mall would be closing as part of a plan to close 14 of its stores nationwide. As of mid March 2015, the Macy's store was shuttered, with all exterior signage removed. The mall was sold to the Kohan Retail Investment Group for $7.25 million in November 2016.

On January 4, 2017, Sears announced that its store would be closing in March 2017. On March 17, 2017, JCPenney announced they would close their location on July 31, 2017. On August 31, 2020, Kohan Retail Investment Group announced that the mall would close permanently to allow for redevelopment to take place. The only remaining anchors at the mall are a 20-screen Regal Cinemas theater LifeStorage, of which is in the former Macy's building (former Kaufmann's), and Planet Fitness of which occupies the former Barnes & Noble building, while the two other anchors spaces, Sears, and JCPenney remain vacant and have since their 2017 closures.

== Revitalization ==
On July 2, 2018, DealPoint Merrill announced they would spend $69 million to bring apartments, a hotel, and a park to the north end of the mall where the vacant Sears building and parking lot are located. On May 1, 2019, DealPoint Merrill revealed early site plans for their proposed luxury apartments. The development is named Belle Oaks at Richmond. Richmond Town Square was planned to be demolished in fall 2020. However, the mall remained open throughout the rest of 2020 and until May 6, 2021 when it finally closed for good. In June 2021, an event was held in the parking lot of the former Sears showing locals the plans of Belle Oaks. The mall was planned to be demolished in the fall of 2021. The remaining portion of the mall was sold to DealPoint Merrill in July 2021. Demolition began on September 18, 2023.
