= National Record Mart =

Defunct record store chain

- Founded: 1937 in Pittsburgh, Pennsylvania
- Founder: Hyman, Sam, and Howard Shapiro
- Defunct: Early 2002
- Fate: Bankruptcy
- Headquarters: Pittsburgh, Pennsylvania, USA
- Number of locations: 130+
- Area served: United States
- Products: Albums

National Record Mart, known as NRM for short, was an American music store chain. The first music store chain in the United States, it was founded in 1937 in Pittsburgh, Pennsylvania, and operated more than 130 locations at its peak. Other stores under its ownership included Oasis, Music X, Waves Music, and Vibes. The chain filed for bankruptcy in 2001 and closed the last of its stores in 2002.

== History ==
It was founded in 1937 by Hyman Shapiro and his sons, Sam and Howard, as Jitterbug Records in downtown Pittsburgh, Pennsylvania. The store specialized in used 78 RPM records from jukeboxes. After opening two more stores, the chain became known as National Record Mart by 1941. Hyman's third son, Jason, later became involved in the family business as well. National Record Mart operated 20 Pittsburgh-area stores in the 1960s, at which point the chain began locating in regional shopping malls, including South Hills Village and Northway Mall (now The Shoppes at Northway). The first stores outside Pennsylvania opened in the 1970s, including Roanoke, Virginia, Buffalo, New York, and Chicago, Illinois. Hyman retired in the mid-1970s, with his three sons maintaining the business. In 1978, National Record Mart opened a new chain, Oasis Records & Tapes.

The Shapiro brothers expanded National Record Mart to 76 stores before retiring and selling the chain to a group of investors headed by William A. Teitelbaum. Under his ownership, the chain planned expansion to over 200 stores, increased its ad campaigns, and introduced a shopping mall-based store called Waves Music, which specialized in compact disc sales. Due to heavy debts assumed by Teitelbaum's leveraged buyout of the chain, 20 locations were sold to The Wall, a music chain owned by British company WHSmith, in 1991. National Record Mart went public in 1993, generating $10 million in capital that year and receiving a new line of credit, in addition to purchasing nine locations from Leonard Smith Music. The chain's turnaround earned it a nomination for Retailer of the Year from the National Association of Recording Merchandisers (now known as the Music Business Association). By the middle of the decade, NRM faced increased competition as discount stores such as Kmart and Walmart began selling music at lower prices than specialty record stores, and chain bookstores such as Barnes & Noble began selling music as well. National Record Mart made a failed attempt to purchase the Wherehouse chain, which was under Chapter 11 bankruptcy protection, at the time.

In the mid-1990s, the chain also opened new concept stores, including an alternative music specialty store called Music X, and Vibes Music, which catered to college markets. National Record Mart introduced websites for both itself and Waves Music in 1998. The sites featured the ability to sell used albums, download music, and create custom-made albums. The chain also expanded into Hawaii and California through a purchase of Tempo Music in 1998. During this time, two of the three Shapiro brothers died: Howard in August and Sam in November.

One year later, National Record Mart entered a partnership with the World Wrestling Federation (now WWE) to sell exclusive licensed products. The chain had 175 stores in 30 states in 1999. Despite the addition of the websites, National Record Mart continued to lose sales through 1999 and 2000. National Record Mart filed for Chapter 11 bankruptcy in June 2001 after five record labels pushed for liquidation, claiming $19 million in owed revenue. As a result, creditors attempted to force Teitelbaum to step down as owner and replace him with Michael Catain. National Record Mart closed the last of its stores in 2002.
