= Euclid Square Mall =

Former shopping mall in Euclid, Ohio

Coordinates: 41.594327°N 81.507461°W

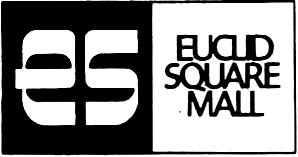

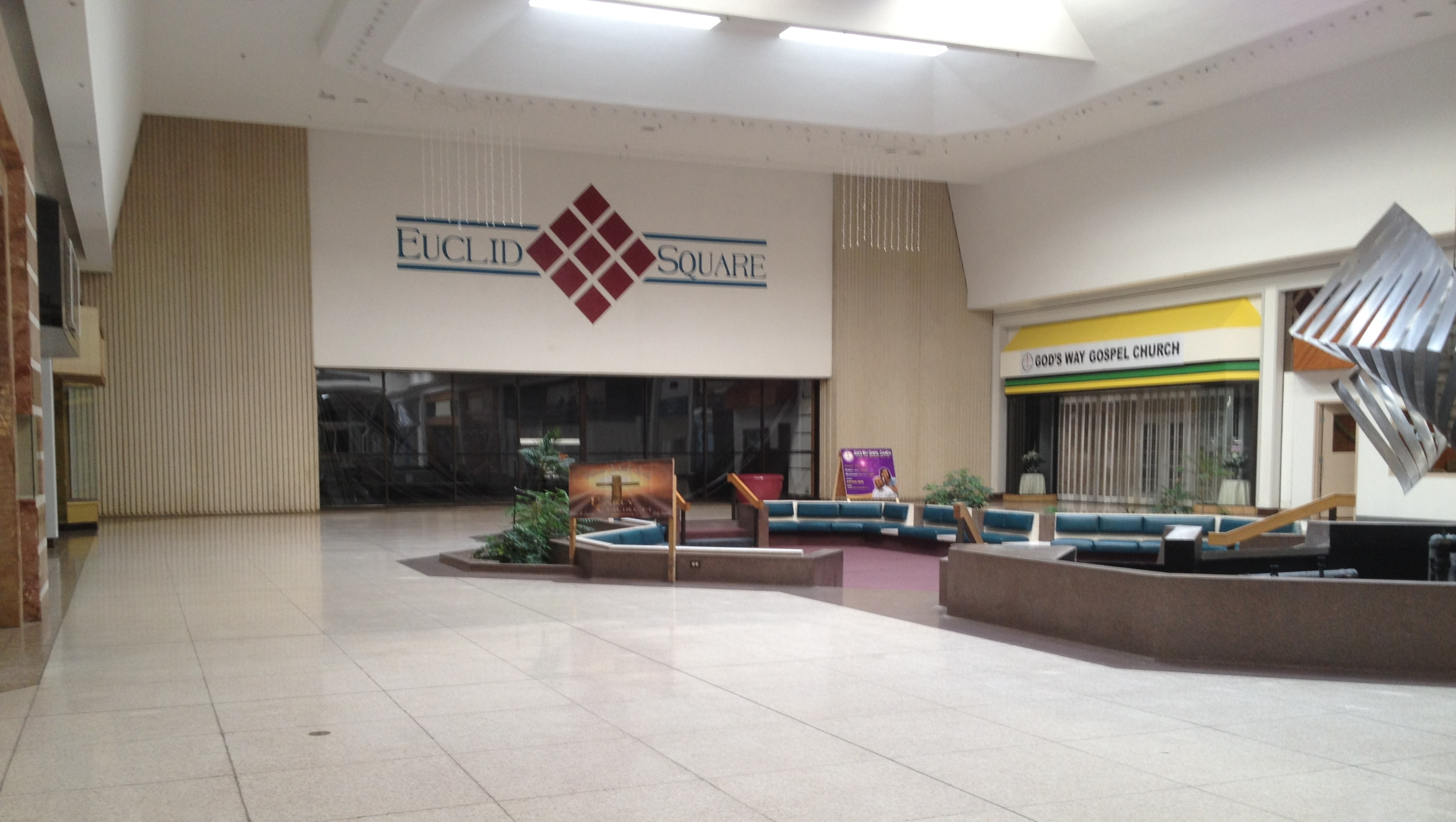
- Interior view of Euclid Square Mall, April 2011
- Location: Euclid, Ohio, United States
- Opened: March 2, 1977
- Closed: July 19, 2016 (last inline retail store closed mid 2000's)
- Developer: Jacobs, Visconsi, Jacobs
- Num. of stores: 72 at peak
- Num. of anchor tenants: 2
- Floor area: 642,528 square feet (59,692.8 m^{2})
- Floors: 1 (2 in former Dillard's and Kaufmann's)

Euclid Square Mall was a shopping mall in Euclid, Ohio, United States. It opened in 1977 as a regional mall with two anchor stores: local chains Higbee's and May Co. It was demolished between 2017 and 2018.

== History ==
Euclid Square Mall was developed by Jacobs, Visconsi & Jacobs; it opened in March 1977 on the site of a former Chase Brass & Copper Co. tubing mill. Originally, the mall comprised more than ninety-two inline tenants, with May Co. and Higbee's as anchor stores. Dillard's acquired Higbee's in 1992. May Co. was consolidated into another division of the parent company, Kaufmann's, a year later. The property at Euclid Square Mall also contains 5 outparcels which included a Toys "R" Us, Dollar Bank, Stop & Shop, Red Lobster a convenience plaza, and another bank. The Dollar Bank parcel was demolished in 2014. The other 4 outparcels are either vacant or functioning as storage facilities by the current owner.

In 1997, expansion plans were announced for a new Kaufmann's to open at Richmond Town Square, another nearby mall. These plans caused rumors that the Kaufmann's at Euclid Square would close, and by 1998, the Kaufmann's at Euclid Square closed. By late 1997, Zamias Enterprises of Pennsylvania acquired Euclid Square Mall from its then-owners, Metropolitan Life Insurance.

Northcenter Entrance

Under Zamias' ownership, several redevelopment plans were considered for the mall, including the possibility of converting it into a power center. Occupancy at the mall began to drop before the mall was sold by Zamias to Raleigh-based Wichard Real Estate, backed up by late investor Haywood Wichard. The Dillard's store was converted to Dillard's Clearance Center by 2002, and the store's upper level was closed.

In early 2004, a collection of outlet vendors known as Outlets USA moved into the former Kaufmann's space. Outlets USA was shuttered in 2006, as the mall's owner thought that the outlet vendors were not "a good blend of merchants and tenants".

A proposal was made in late 2006 to include the largely vacant mall property as part of a reconstruction of an abandoned industrial park located nearby.

By July 2013, the building housed 24 churches.

In September 2013, Dillard's Clearance Center closed when the store's lease ended.

The city of Euclid ordered the mall closed in the autumn of 2016 "due to safety concerns".

In September 2017, Amazon announced plans to build a fulfillment center on the site of the mall, with an expected opening date of 2019. The Amazon fulfillment center officially opened in 2019 on the site of the former mall and mall grounds.
