= Lemington Elementary School =

- U.S. National Register of Historic Places
- City of Pittsburgh Historic Structure
- Pittsburgh Landmark – PHLF
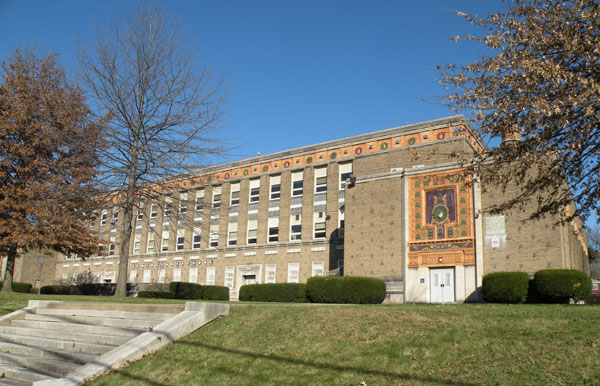

- Location within Pittsburgh Location within Pennsylvania Location within the United States
- Location: 7060 Lemington Ave., Pittsburgh, Pennsylvania
- Coordinates: 40°28′12″N 79°53′47″W
- Area: 2 acres (0.81 ha)
- Built: 1937
- Architect: Steen, Marion M.; Navarro Corp.
- Architectural style: Art Deco
- MPS: Pittsburgh Public Schools TR
- NRHP reference No.: 86002681

Significant dates
- Added to NRHP: September 30, 1986
- Designated CPHS: November 30, 1999
- Designated PHLF: 2001

The Lemington Elementary School in the Lincoln-Lemington-Belmar neighborhood of Pittsburgh, Pennsylvania is a building from 1937. Portions of the exterior are ornamented with terracotta, and feature Mayan-inspired motifs such as an amber sunburst frieze and stylized human faces. It was listed on the National Register of Historic Places in 1986.

The school currently houses Catalyst Academy Charter School, which was founded in 2020 and will serve grades K-8 by 2028.
