= Tiger Ranch Cat Sanctuary =

Coordinates: 40°37′56.79″N 79°47′30.04″W

Tiger Ranch Cat Sanctuary was a 27-acre (110,000 m^{2}) cat sanctuary located in Frazer Township, Pennsylvania and operated by Linda Marie Bruno (aka Lin Marie) for 14 years.

== Raid and arrest ==
On March 13, 2008, the Pennsylvania Society for the Prevention of Cruelty to Animals (PSPCA) raided the property and found 750 cats living in "horrible condition" including sick and dehydrated cats and dead cats in litter boxes, burial pits and freezers. Over 600 cats were removed from the property, along with 9 dogs, 6 horses and 1 goat.

=== District Attorney files charges of cruelty to animals ===
Bruno was initially charged with 14 counts of cruelty to animals. On April 3, 2008, district judge Suzanne Blaschak dismissed 593 charges of animal cruelty against Bruno saying prosecutors failed to provide enough detailed evidence. The district attorney's office refiled the charges against Linda Bruno with more specific information on April 8 2008

=== Initial hearing postponed ===
A hearing scheduled for April 17, 2008 for Bruno was postponed until April 28 and 29, and moved from a West Deer district judge's office to the Allegheny County Courthouse in Pittsburgh, Pennsylvania, because of space and safety considerations. Bruno is charged with 574 counts of animal cruelty.

=== Preliminary hearing begins ===
The first day of the hearing was April 29, 2008, during which the prosecution began presenting their evidence including a video which showed some cats who appeared to be healthy and some that appeared unhealthy. Defense lawyer Ron Valasek stated that he would "address those pictures when he cross-examines PSPCA Humane Agent Rebecca McDonald." Representatives of three shelters have been subpoenaed as defense witnesses and were present. Agents from Animal Friends, the Western Pennsylvania Humane Society and the Somerset Humane Society said that they have inspected Tiger Ranch in the past and have found no reason to file charges.

PSPCA veterinarians uniformly reported catastrophic illnesses in the cats seized at the Tiger Ranch compound. "Most deaths have resulted from the calicivirus, secondary infections such as upper respiratory infections and pneumonia, and emaciation from not receiving proper nutrition," Dr. Becky Morrow said. Dr. Morrow described a dead cat discovered behind freezers containing many perished animals, stating, "During the necropsy, I remember pulling eight round worms from its intestine. It appears as if the cat died of starvation, secondary to an upper respiratory infection and from the roundworms."

Allegheny County District Judge Susan Blaschak concluded, "In the absence of duty, care, food, water and helping the animals get to it … this rises to the level of torturous conduct," and upheld nearly 600 charges for a July 7, 2008, arraignment.

== Guilty plea and sentencing ==
In July 2009, Bruno pleaded guilty to 12 misdemeanor counts of cruelty to animals and two counts of tampering with public records. Prosecutors withdrew more than 500 other charges related to the case.

In January 2010, Allegheny County Judge Jill E. Rangos sentenced Bruno to 27 years on probation and two years on house arrest. She was ordered to pay $212,000 in fines and restitution. She was ordered to have no contact with animals and to continue mental health treatment. She was sentenced to one to six months in jail but was given credit for 37 days served, and did not serve any more time in jail.

=== Violations of sentence ===
In March 2010, Rangos chastised Bruno over allegations she violated the terms of her sentence by not selling her interests in a horse-breeding business and going on lengthy shopping sprees while on house arrest. She also failed to be evaluated by a licensed psychiatrist, dissolve Tiger Ranch, make any restitution payments and had not kept up with house arrest fees, all conditions of her sentence.

In June 2010, Rangos declined a request to jail Bruno for the violations of her probation and house arrest. She was to be allowed out of her home only for work, mental health therapy and "absolute necessities," the judge ordered.

== State reprimand ==
In April 2010, the secretary of the commonwealth issued a public reprimand to Bruno for violating rules governing charitable organizations. She signed a consent agreement March 25 in which she admitted she commingled donations to Tiger Ranch with money for her personal use and benefit. The order bars her from serving as an officer in any charitable organization that solicits contributions. In lieu of a fine, Bruno agreed to dissolve the Tiger Ranch corporation.

== Tiger Ranch supporters oppose charges ==
Bruno's supporters wanted all charges against her dropped. They say she is not a bad person and was doing the best she could to care for so many animals. Meanwhile, Animal Friends says there's a silver lining to the situation because it's bringing attention to the plight of stray and feral cats. They would like to host a summit on the issue to figure out solutions to the problem. The organization did an investigation at Tiger Ranch in 2006 and found it was sanitary.

Disputing the animal cruelty charges, Bruno told Andy Sheehan that she was on a Christian mission to save hundreds of stray and feral cats from certain death. "We take in cats that others reject. We take in cats that others will not take," Bruno added. "I am giving these cats a chance that they otherwise wouldn't have. I am giving them a second and third chance of life."

The case has caused a great deal of concern and has divided opinions among animal rescue and welfare groups within Pennsylvania and across the country. KDKA-TV reported that "as the battle will likely continue inside the court, it will likely rage on outside as well as animal rights groups face off."

=== Last Chance for Animals ===
==== Chris DeRose ====
Chris DeRose of the Los Angeles-based Last Chance for Animals (LCA) said his group investigated the findings of undercover volunteer Deborah Urmann. "In October of 2007, I was asked to do an investigation of Tiger Ranch," DeRose said. "I swear by Tiger Ranch and was unable to do it. I refused based on previous records. Here is one lone woman with a band of volunteers," he said. "I am so impressed with her, yet bothered and hurt by the investigation and the PSPCA and the conclusion they have made. We want the animals returned and the witch hunt stopped."

==== Mike Winikoff ====
However, Mike Winikoff, a former LCA employee who responded to initial allegations against Tiger Ranch and the defendant, sharply dissented from the DeRose's conclusion. Winkioff stated, "I was working for Last Chance for Animals when the initial complaints about Tiger Ranch came in to the office. I concluded that there was evidence of horrible suffering at Tiger Ranch, and requested authorization to conduct a more thorough investigation. My request was approved, but then abruptly withdrawn. I've never fully understood why LCA pulled me off of that investigation. After I left LCA, I continued to look into Tiger Ranch and became more and more convinced that the allegations were valid. As a 20-year veteran of the animal rights movement, including a decade as an undercover investigator, I remain convinced that Tiger Ranch deserved to be closed and investigated for animal cruelty. I believe that our mission as animal advocates is to prevent and alleviate suffering wherever it occurs, even when the suffering is created by those who may be trying to do good things for animals. I do not believe that good intentions absolve us of the consequences of our actions. That applies both to Tiger Ranch and the people who dumped cats there without fully investigating their likely fate."
