= Psycho Bunny =

Men's clothing company based in Montreal

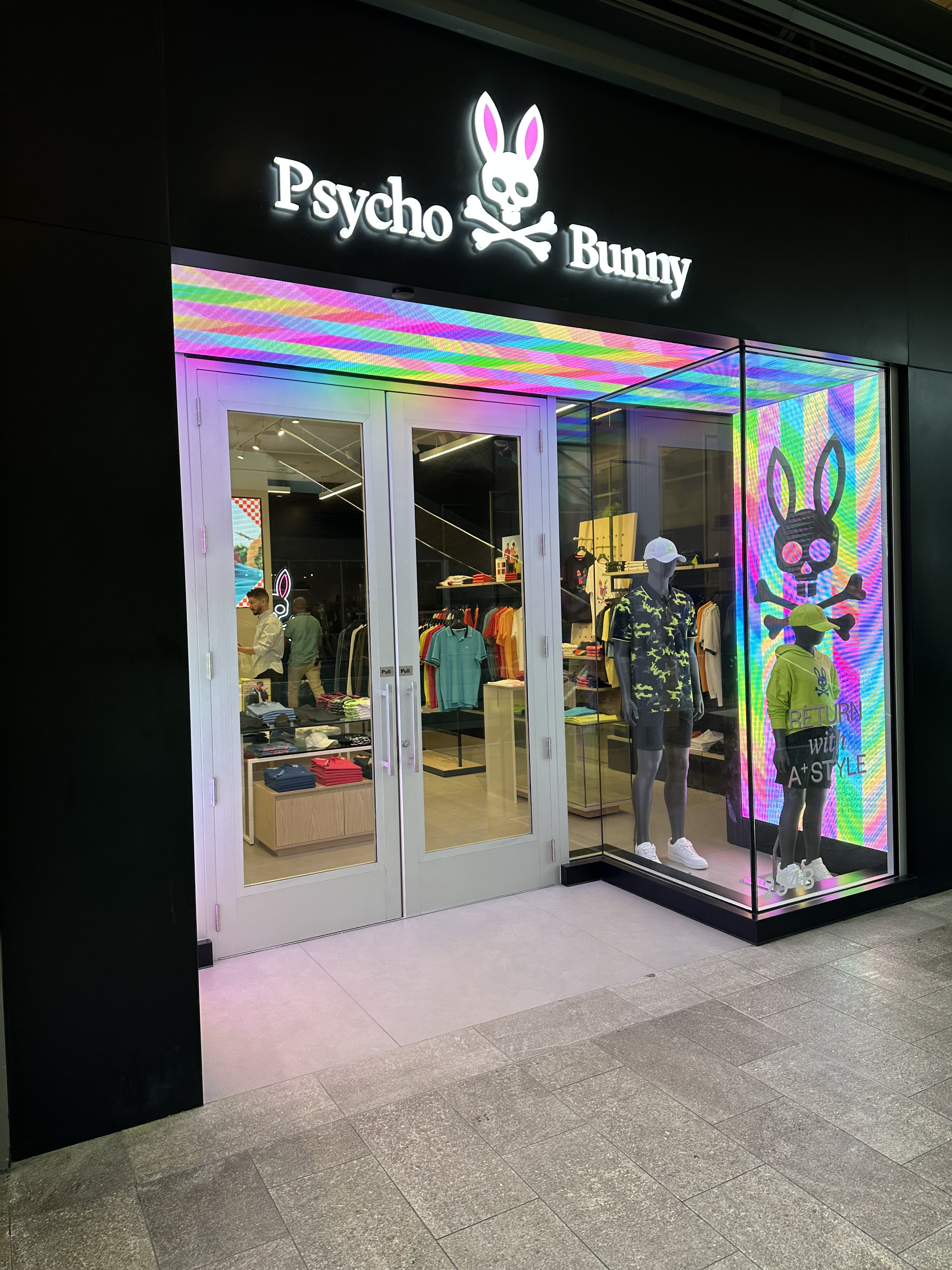
- Type: Private
- Industry: Clothing
- Founded: 2005; 21 years ago
- Founder: Robert Godley; Robert Goldman
- Headquarters: Montreal, Quebec, Canada
- Key people: Anna Martini (CEO)
- Website: psychobunny.com

Psycho Bunny is a privately held men's, women's, and children's clothing company founded in 2005. Its headquarters are in Montreal and it has an office in New York City, where it was founded.

In 2005, Robert Godley founded men's contemporary label Psycho Bunny with friend and business partner Robert Goldman. Handmade from English silk, Psycho Bunny neckwear featured designs like tiny spades and Donnie Darko-style rabbit skulls, the latter inspiring the label's name. Godley once stated: "When I showed that tie to a buyer, she said, look at the psycho bunny! The name stuck". Since the launch of the initial neckwear collection, the brand has expanded into other categories including polo shirts and t-shirts, bottoms, cashmere scarves and socks, and a golf collection.

Alen Brandman, CEO of Thread Collective, took ownership of the company in 2021.

In 2022, Psycho Bunny opened stores in Kenwood Towne Centre, Ross Park Mall, and Easton Town Center. In Fall 2023, Psycho Bunny opened a location in West Edmonton Mall.

== Tennis tournament sponsorships ==
In 2024, Psycho Bunny signed a multi-year contract to be a silver-tier sponsor of the National Bank Open (NBO) tennis tournaments in Montreal and Toronto until 2027. They are the official athletic apparel sponsor for Tennis Canada for the NBO, as well as the Davis Cup and Billie Jean King Cup. They also supply outfits for all volunteers and put up merchandise stands for exclusive clothing at both tournaments.
