= Camp Landing Entertainment District =

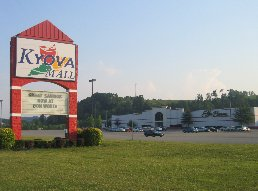
- The mall, when it was known as Kyova Mall
- Location: Cannonsburg, Kentucky, near Ashland, Kentucky, United States
- Coordinates: 38.400806°N 82.714322°W
- Opened: 1988 (as Cedar Knoll Galleria); 2021 (as Camp Landing Entertainment District)
- Closed: 2021 (as Kyova Mall)
- Developer: George D. Zamias
- Owner: Jason Camp
- Num. of anchor tenants: 4
- Floor area: approx. 600,000 square feet (56,000 m^{2})
- Floors: 1

Camp Landing Entertainment District is an enclosed shopping mall located outside the city of Ashland, Kentucky, United States, in Cannonsburg. Opened in 1988 as Cedar Knoll Galleria, the mall struggled to keep tenants for several years, eventually becoming a dead mall. Starting in 2005, the mall was renamed Kyova Mall and redevelopment began on the property. Customer traffic had increased, until further store closings, including two anchor tenants, Sears and Elder-Beerman, and the COVID-19 pandemic forced the mall to close. On July 16, 2021, it was announced that the mall was sold by Eggleston Associates to Jason Camp, Glockner Family, and Boyd County and that a major redevelopment plan would start immediately, renaming the area to Camp Landing Entertainment District. As of 2023, current anchors include the Sandy's Racing & Gaming casino, indoor amusement center Malibu Jack's, The Cinema at Camp Landing, and Rural King, with other major tenants including restaurants Smokin' J's, Backyard Pizza, Tap That Sports, and Burger King.

== History ==
=== 1989–2005: Cedar Knoll Galleria ===
The mall opened in October 1989 as the Cedar Knoll Galleria. It was developed by Zamias Services, Inc., on the site of a former golf course (whose namesake the mall took). Approximately 600,000 square feet (56,000 m^{2}) in size, the mall was originally anchored by Sears, Stone & Thomas, Phar-Mor, and Kmart; plans for the mall included space for a theater in the rear, as well as another anchor store. Stone & Thomas would later convert to Elder-Beerman as the former chain was purchased.

Even though Cedar Knoll Galleria was located near Interstate 64, it was not very convenient for Ashland residents, who preferred Ashland Town Center, located closer to downtown Ashland. As a result, Cedar Knoll languished for many years, struggling to keep spaces leased. Some spaces were never leased, creating noticeable gaps between stores.

Also leading to the mall's demise was the opening of a Walmart Supercenter in 1994 roughly a mile away from the mall, drawing from the mall's customer base. In 2001, the mall's Italian Oven restaurant closed, as it was discovered that the restaurant could not legally serve alcohol. By 2001, the mall's food court would be devoid of restaurants. Kmart's bankruptcy filings in 2002 resulted in the closure of the mall's Kmart location; Phar-Mor would close the same year, also as part of bankruptcy.

=== 2005–2021: Kyova Mall ===
In 2005, Eggleston Associates of Cincinnati, Ohio, purchased the mall from its original developer. Shortly thereafter, a new plan for the mall was developed; Eggleston also renamed the mall Kyova Mall. A new roof was also installed, which included repairs to the central segment of the shopping center, as it was in bad condition. Talks began again for a movie theatre in the slot where one had originally been planned. Steve & Barry's opened in the old Kmart in 2005.

On May 11, 2006, plans were announced to add a new movie theater complex to the mall; within a year, it had been confirmed that Phoenix Theatres would open a location in the former Phar-Mor. as Phoenix had more experience in retrofitting theaters into existing retail big-box stores The 10-screen theater, which opened in May 2007, includes high-back "stadium seating" chairs, making it the second theater in the region to feature stadium seating. Since the opening of the theater, the mall has seen a significant increase in traffic, although only 21% of its smaller shop space is occupied. The Phoenix Theatre was later renamed to KYOVA 10 Theatre.

On May 22, 2007, voters in Boyd County approved alcohol sales in the county by a 67% margin; all but one precinct voted in favor. The law would allow alcohol to be served in restaurants that seat at least 100 people that have food sales as 70% of total revenue. The measure, pushed by the management at the mall in order to boost business and attract new restaurants, went to ballot after 6,000 signatures were signed in support. Steve & Barry's closed in September 2008.

September 2008, Wilma's Dress Shop, featuring bridal and formal wear, opened and Knot Just Pretzels joined the mall food court.

In November 2008, Sophia's opened featuring makeovers, clothing, accessories and Lee Middleton Dolls.

In December 2008, RJ Kahuna's Sports Bar & Grill opened.

In January 2009, Custom Metal Creations opened after coming into the mall as a holiday shop. Chris' Gyros joined the food court leaving one vacancy and Summit Brokerage Services opened. Dollar Tree opened in February 2009. T-Bird's Diner opened in early 2010 in the food court.

The Treasure Chest has been open and been in the mall since April 2009.

In October 2010, the Ashland Table Tennis Club (ATTC) began utilizing the former Radio Shack store space.

In February 2014, it was announced that Sears would be closing, one of the mall's original anchor stores. After a three-month liquidation, the store officially closed in May 2014. Rural King began converting the former Kmart/Steve & Barry's space in April 2015.

In August 2016, Extreme Air, the Tri-State's first indoor trampoline park, opened. Extreme Air left the Kyova Mall to move to the Huntington Mall in Barboursville on August 10, 2019.

Elder-Beerman closed during the company's bankruptcy and vacated the mall by the end of July 2018.

The mall was severely affected by the COVID-19 pandemic, forcing more closures inside as the power was shut off for some portions of the mall. The Kyova branch of the Boyd County Public Library closed during the pandemic, as a new branch near the mall replaced it in September 2021.

=== 2021–present: Camp Landing Entertainment District ===
On July 16, 2021, it was announced that Eggleston Associates had sold the mall to Jason Camp, Glockner Family, and Boyd County that a major redevelopment plan would start immediately. The mall was renamed in the process to Camp Landing Entertainment District. Plans for the space include a convention center, hotel and restaurant, farmers market, residential area, sports complex, distillery, and various niche retail businesses.

Malibu Jack's, an indoor amusement center company based in Lexington, announced a new 135,000 square foot location for the mall, which opened that holiday season in the space that was once occupied by Elder-Beerman. The KYOVA 10 Theatre, now named The Cinema at Camp Landing, reopened in August. The Rural King and Burger King currently located in the area will stay, while the Callihan's American Pub & Grill restaurant closed, replaced by Smokin' J's. Plans to sell the former Sears to Revolutionary Racing LLC, a horse racing company, were approved by the Boyd County government in October 2022. The casino, known as Sandy's Racing & Gaming, opened October 26, 2023. The redevelopment of the mall is expected to exceed initial expectations and provide over 1,000 jobs.
