= Indiana Mall =

Coordinates: 40.607689°N 79.183368°W

- Location: Indiana, PA
- Address: 2334 Oakland Ave; Indiana, PA
- Opened: 1 October 1979
- Developer: Zamias Services, Inc.
- Owner: Kohan Retail Investment Group; Summit Properties USA
- Num. of stores: 30+
- Num. of anchor tenants: 5
- Floor area: 456,084 square feet (42,371.6 m^{2})
- Floors: 1
- Parking: 1,863
- Website: www.indianamallpa.com

The Indiana Mall is a single-level, indoor, regional mall which is located in Indiana, Pennsylvania, United States. Located on the western edge of town near the intersection of Oakland Ave (PA 286) and Indian Springs Road (US 422 Business), this mall's anchor stores are MovieScoop Cinemas, Dunham's Sports, Harbor Freight Tools, Kohl's, JCPenney and Rural King.

== History ==
Old Navy joined the mall in 2006, and closed six years later. The mall's movie theater, formerly owned by Carmike Cinemas, was sold to Golden Star Theaters in 2015. On June 6, 2017, Sears Holdings announced that the Kmart store would be closing as part of a plan to close 72 stores nationwide. It closed in October 2017. Kmart was expanded in 1992. On November 2, 2017, Sears Holdings announced that the Sears store would also be closing as part of a plan to close 63 stores nationwide. The store closed in January 2018. Four months later, The Bon-Ton announced that it would close its location here as part of the storewide liquidations due to bankruptcy. IBEX, a call center in the mall, closed at the end of June 2018. Kohl's joined the mall in 2019, taking over the vacant Sears space.

Indiana Mall was turned over to the bank by Zamias in December 2020. Zamias remained as mall management. Dunham's Sports was also announced to replace the former Bon-Ton and would open in July 2023. Indiana Mall was sold to the Kohan Retail Investment Group in April 2022 for $6.9 million. In 2025, the former Kmart store began to be converted into a Rural King. The store opened on August 7, 2025. With Rural King opening, all the anchor spaces are currently occupied.
