= Richland Town Center =

- Location: Johnstown, Pennsylvania, United States
- Coordinates: 40.27652°N 78.84385°W
- Address: U.S. Route 219 at Elton Road and Theatre Drive
- Opened: 1974 (as Richland Mall); 2004 (as Richland Town Center)
- Closed: 1998 (Richland Mall)
- Previous names: Richland Mall
- Developer: Unimich Development
- Manager: MPG Development
- Owner: MPG Development
- Num. of stores: 30+
- Num. of anchor tenants: 8
- Floor area: 490,000 square feet (46,000 m^{2}) (Richland Mall); 490,000 square feet (46,000 m^{2}) (Richland Town Center)
- Floors: 1
- Parking: 2,000+ spaces
- Public transit: CamTran bus: 9, 11, 17, 21; WCTA bus: 11
- Website: mpgpropertygroup.com/properties/richland.html

Richland Town Center is a power center in Johnstown, Pennsylvania, United States. It is located on U.S. Route 219 at Elton Road and Theatre Drive. The center opened in 2004 on the site of the former Richland Mall. Existing from 1974 to 1998, Richland Mall was an enclosed shopping mall whose anchor stores were Sears, Kmart, and Penn Traffic; Sears later became Hills and then Ames, while Penn Traffic later became Hess's and then The Bon-Ton. Richland Mall was shuttered in 1998 after losing business to The Johnstown Galleria which opened in 1992. Richland Mall was then torn down and redeveloped as a strip mall, which features Walmart, TJ Maxx/HomeGoods, Best Buy, and Ulta as its anchor stores.

== History ==
Unimich Development, a real estate company based in Grand Rapids, Michigan, announced development of Richland Mall in 1974. The site chosen for the mall was on the southeastern side of Johnstown, Pennsylvania, just off U.S. Route 219 and on the former site of a drive-in theater. Plans called for a 650,000-square-foot (60,000 m^{2}), 70-store enclosed shopping mall with three anchor stores: Kmart, Sears, and Johnstown-based Penn Traffic. Of these, Sears would be replacing an existing store in Johnstown. With this selection of stores, Richland Mall became the first shopping center in the United States to have both Kmart and Sears as tenants. The Kmart store would also be the first in the entire chain to feature direct access from the concourse of a shopping mall. Groundbreaking began on May 1, 1973, and the mall officially opened for business on November 4, 1974, although the three anchor stores and a Shop 'n Save supermarket all opened in October. Allentown, Pennsylvania-based department store Hess's bought the Penn Traffic chain in 1982. Crown American, which owned Hess's at the time, announced a $2.5 million dollar renovation of the store, which included the addition of new décor in each department, as well as the addition of furniture.

In 1992, Zamias Services, Inc. developed The Johnstown Galleria, a larger mall just north of Richland Mall, to which Sears relocated that year. The Hess's at Richland Mall was one of several to be sold to York, Pennsylvania-based The Bon-Ton in late 1994. In early 1996, mall owners announced renovation plans that included the addition of an antique carousel, as well as proposals to expand Kmart and add an ice rink. Also by this point, Hills had replaced the vacated Sears. Despite this announcement, Richland Mall saw a severe decrease in tenancy as many other stores including The Bon-Ton also relocated to The Johnstown Galleria, to the point that the mall's owners announced that the entire property would be closed by March 1998 except for Kmart and Hills. The vacant mall was put up for auction in 2000, by which point the Hills chain had been acquired by Ames. The mall became fully vacant in 2003 after both Ames and Kmart closed: the former after filing for bankruptcy, and the latter after failing to renew its lease. The closure of these stores allowed for then-owners Heritage Development to begin demolition of the property for a new shopping center anchored by Walmart.

Richland Town Center opened on the site of the former Richland Mall in stages between late 2004 and early 2005. It is owned and managed by MPG Property Group. In addition to Walmart, major tenants include TJ Maxx and Best Buy.
