= Robert Godley =

British menswear designer (born 1971)

Robert Godley (born 7 July 1971) is a British fashion designer.

== Career ==
Godley spent nearly his entire adult life in fashion, working for David Evans & Co. Silk Printers (London), Mantero Silk Printers and Weavers (Como, Italy), and Drakes of London. Godley designed ties for gentleman's bespoke clothier Turnbull & Asser in London from 1996 to 1997 and Drakes of London from 1997 to 2004 before moving to the United States from London to serve as Creative Director for Polo Ralph Lauren.

In 2005, Godley founded men's contemporary label Psycho Bunny with friend and business partner Robert Goldman. Handmade from English silk, Psycho Bunny neckwear features everything from tiny spades to Donnie Darko-style rabbit skulls, the latter inspiring the label's name. Godley stated: "When I showed that tie to a buyer, she said, 'Look at the psycho bunny! The name stuck." Since the initial launch of the Psycho Bunny neckwear collection, the brand has expanded into multiple categories including polo shirts and t-shirts, bottoms, cashmere scarves and socks, and most recently a golf collection.

== Personal life ==
In 2009, Godley became engaged to actress Jane Krakowski. Their son was born on 13 April 2011 in New York City. The couple separated in 2013. He married Alexis Godley in 2017.

As of 2018, he resides between New York City and Hampton Bays, New York.

Godley is an avid fisherman and owns a 33-foot center console fishing boat he named "Ginger Ninja", a term of endearment he gave his son. He supported Big Brothers Big Sisters of Long Island philanthropically with a limited edition collection of Psycho Bunny t-shirts designed after Ginger Ninja.
