= Zamias Services, Inc. =

Commercial real estate company based in Pennsylvania, U.S.

- Industry: Retail, real estate
- Founded: 1957; 69 years ago
- Founder: George Zamias
- Headquarters: Johnstown, Pennsylvania, United States
- Key people: Perry Russ (president)
- Products: Real estate, shopping malls

Zamias Services, Inc. is a commercial real estate leasing and management company based in Johnstown, Pennsylvania. The company was created by shopping mall developer George D. Zamias and traces its history back to 1957.

== History ==
George D. Zamias worked as a real estate agent for eight years prior to founding the George D. Zamias Real Estate Company in 1961, which began constructing shopping centers the following year. The company was reincorporated as the Zamias Construction Company, Inc. in 1967, and then reincorporated again as George D. Zamias Developer in 1968.

Carolina Circle Mall was purchased out of foreclosure in September 1993 for $16 million from General Electric Capital. Beechmont Mall was purchased in 1997 for $24 million. Zamias sold Euclid Square Mall for $4 million to Haywood E. Wichard in August 2000. Metropolitan Life Insurance sold Zamias 10 malls in 1998. Zamias filed for Chapter 11 bankruptcy in May 2001, due to the loss of a lawsuit filed by American Property Consultants. The company also faced legal issues with Goldman Sachs in 2001, and stopped managing 14 malls it owned with them. Zamias exited bankruptcy in 2004. Diamond Run Mall, built by Zamias in 1995, was sold for $53.2 million to Gemini Real Estate Advisors in September 2007. Gemini kept Zamias as mall management.

The Johnstown Galleria, built by Zamias in 1992, was sold for over $57 million to Gemini Real Estate Advisors in July 2008. Gemini kept Zamias as mall management. America's Realty purchased 50% of Olean Center Mall from Zamias in August 2008. Warren Mall was sold under pressure from Sun America bank, for $720,000 to Kohan Retail Investment Group in April 2011. The mall at the time of sale was considered distressed and not salvageable. Zamias and Bon Aviv Investment LLC in April 2012 purchased five shopping centers for $68 million from Kimco Realty. Zamias with partners repurchased Diamond Run Mall in 2013. The Mall at Steamtown, while under foreclosure in March 2014, was run by Zamias. Boulevard Mall, while under foreclosure in December 2017 was managed by Zamias.

Diamond Run Mall closed for redevelopment in Fall 2019. Zamias was replaced as management of The Johnstown Galleria on February 1, 2020, due to the mall entering receivership. In December 2020, Zamias sold the Olean Center Mall and surrendered the Indiana Mall to an undisclosed bank. As a result of these transactions, Zamias no longer owns any active shopping malls for the first time since George Zamias first began developing malls. It does, however, still own the shuttered Diamond Run Mall with the intent to redevelop it.

== Pittsburgh Mills ==
Originally known as the Frazer Heights Galleria, Zamias started plans to construct Pittsburgh Mills in 1981. The Mills Corporation, Zamias, and KanAm Group built Pittsburgh Mills at a cost of $285 million, and it opened in July 2005. Zamias took over the mall from partner Mills in December 2006, splitting ownership with KanAm. Wells Fargo foreclosed on Pittsburgh Mills in 2015, with Pittsburgh Mills Limited Partnership owing $142.9 million on its loan. The mall's value by March 2016 had fallen to $11 million, down from $190 million in 2006. Wells Fargo purchased the mall at auction for $100 in January 2017.

== List of major properties ==
Major properties owned or managed by Zamias as of 2020 include:

- Diamond Run Mall, Rutland, Vermont
- Indiana Mall, Indiana, Pennsylvania
- Northern Lights Shopping Center, Economy, Pennsylvania

== List of former major properties ==
Major properties previously owned or managed by Zamias include:

- The Johnstown Galleria, Johnstown, Pennsylvania
- Olean Center Mall, Olean, New York
- York Galleria, York, Pennsylvania
- Columbia Colonnade, Bloomsburg, Pennsylvania
- Kyova Tri-State Mall, Ashland, Kentucky
- Pittsburgh Mills, Frazer Township, Pennsylvania
- Warren Mall, Warren, Pennsylvania
- Meadville Mall, Meadville, Pennsylvania
- Clearview Mall, Butler, Pennsylvania
- Cranberry Mall, Oil City, Pennsylvania
- DuBois Mall, DuBois, Pennsylvania
- Clearfield Mall, Clearfield, Pennsylvania
- Carolina Circle Mall, Greensboro, North Carolina
- Rock Hill Galleria, Rock Hill, South Carolina
- Houston County Galleria, Centerville, Georgia
- Port Plaza Mall, Green Bay, Wisconsin (from 1997 to 2001)
