= The Johnstown Galleria =

Coordinates: 40.29966°N 78.83394°W

- Location: Johnstown, Pennsylvania, United States
- Address: 500 Galleria Drive
- Opened: 1992
- Developer: Zamias Services, Inc.
- Manager: Leo Karruli
- Owner: Leo Karruli
- Num. of stores: 70
- Num. of anchor tenants: 4
- Floor area: 894,646 square feet (83,120 m^{2})
- Floors: 2
- Website: The Galleria

The Johnstown Galleria is a two-level shopping mall in Johnstown, Pennsylvania. It is anchored by Boscov's and J. C. Penney.

== History ==
Boscov's opened before the mall on September 19, 1992, and was the chains first store constructed in Central/Western Pennsylvania. The Johnstown Galleria was built by Zamias Services, Inc. and opened on October 22, 1992, with space for a fifth anchor that was never filled. It opened with anchors Bon-Ton, Boscov's, J. C. Penney, and Sears. The Boscov's, former Bon-Ton, and former Sears buildings are independently owned. Zamias sold the mall to Gemini Real Estate Advisors for $57 million in 2008, but remained as management.

Steve & Barry's had a small format store open for a short time at the mall in the late 2000s. Adar Johnstown Limited Liability Corporation purchased the property the mall is located on in 2014. Pax Mall Realty settled a tax dispute with Cambria County over the value of the Boscov's anchor in 2017. Bon-Ton closed at the mall in late April 2018 and was the first anchor to close in the Galleria. Sears closed in summer 2018. The mall's owners in 2018 won a tax reassessment from the Richland School District in court, reducing the mall's value from $6.5 to $3 million. Parking lot and road conditions were reported as poor in March 2019.

Spinoso Real Estate Group took over management from Zamias Services, Inc. on February 1, 2020, due to the mall entering receivership. ADAR Johnstown Limited Liability Co., the owner of the mall's property, owed $14.6 million and stopped mortgage payments in October 2019. The Galleria was scheduled to be sold at a tax sale on September 14, 2020, due to owing $1.1 million in taxes. It was later removed from the sale due to the mall's owner, Adar Johnstown, LLC, setting up a payment plan. The Galleria was to go for sheriff's sale on December 11, 2020, but that was later delayed.

The mall served as a COVID-19 vaccination site in early 2021. The Johnstown Galleria was sold at sheriff's sale to the U.S. Bank National Association for $238,718 on September 10, 2021. The mall minus the separately owned anchor buildings went to auction in August 2022 and sold for $3,150,000 to Leo Karruli.

== See also ==
- Richland Town Center
- List of shopping malls in Pennsylvania
