= Olympia Sports =

Retail company

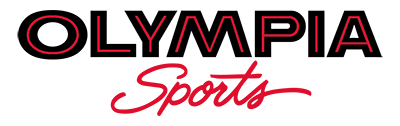

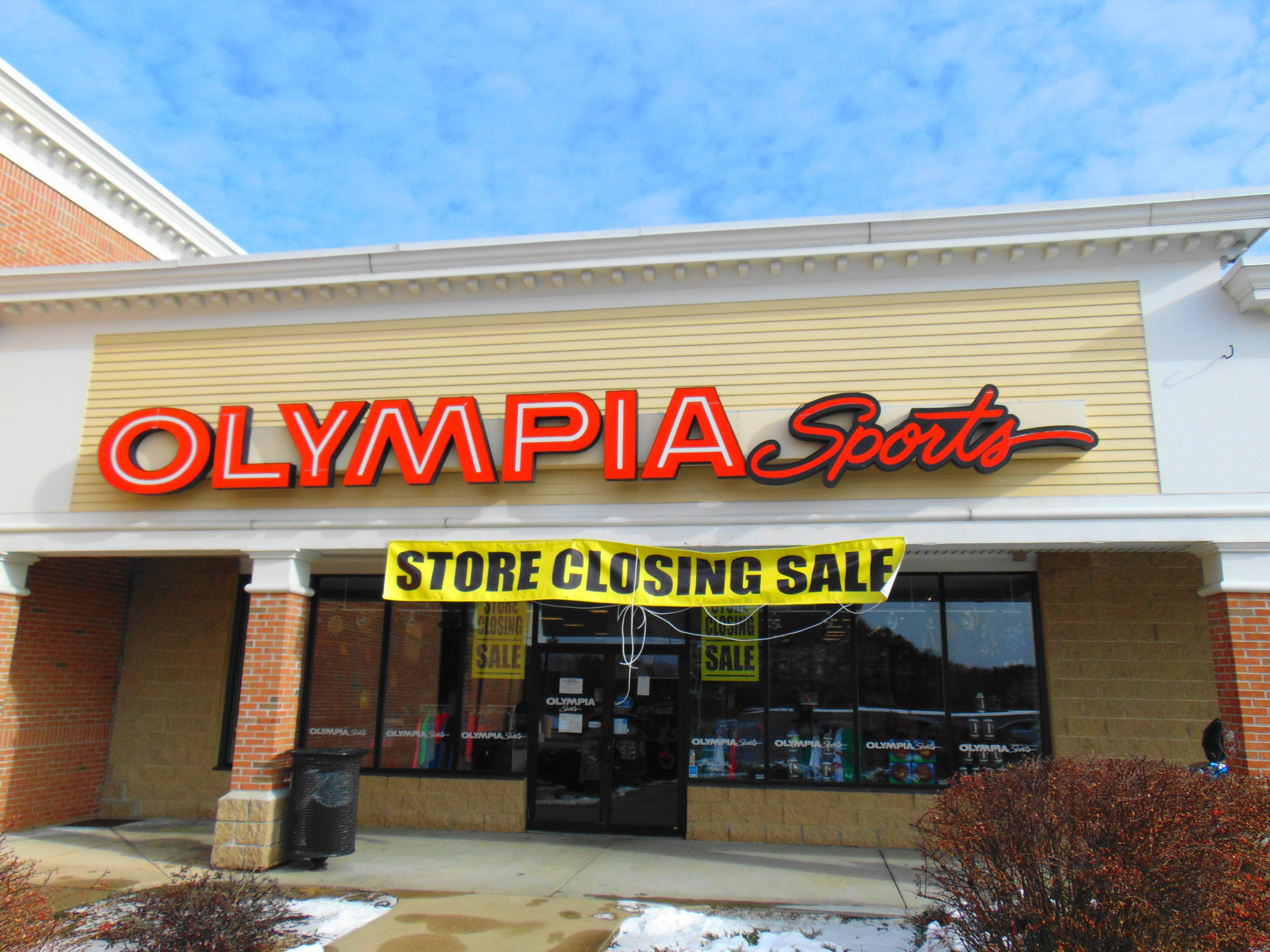
- An Olympia sport store in Webster 2017
- Company type: Private company
- Industry: Retail
- Founded: 1975
- Founder: Ed Manganello
- Defunct: September 2022
- Fate: Bankruptcy and liquidation
- Headquarters: Westbrook, Maine, United States
- Number of locations: 152 (2015)
- Products: Sporting goods
- Website: olympiasports.net

Olympia Sports was an American sporting goods retail company. The company was founded in 1975 in Portland, Maine. Before it went under liquidation, Olympia Sports had 152 locations, mostly across New England, New York, and the Mid-Atlantic. It was headquartered in nearby Westbrook, Maine, and had a flagship store in Boston.

Olympia Sports also housed the Olympia Sports Foundation, a non-profit clothing bank, where unused clothing and vendor materials are donated to individuals in need. The foundation was shut down in 2016 as a cost-saving measure.

== History ==
The company was founded in 1975 in Portland, Maine and grew to 152 stores mostly across New England, New York, and the Mid-Atlantic.

In October 2019, it was announced that Denver, Colorado-based JackRabbit would purchase 75 of the remaining 152 stores, the other 77 stores to be liquidated.

On May 5, 2022 Schottenstein Stores acquired some of the locations and began liquidation sales.

On July 22, 2022, it was announced that all of the remaining Olympia Sports stores would be liquidated and closed by the end of September. In September 2022, Olympia filed for Chapter 11 bankruptcy.

On February 17, 2023, it was announced that all of the remaining Olympia Sports intellectual properties were sold to Albert Fouerti at an auction.
