= The Block Northway =

- Location: Ross Township, Allegheny County, Pennsylvania, United States
- Coordinates: 40.5513°N 80.0213°W
- Opened: 1953; 73 years ago (enclosed August 1962)
- Previous names: Northway Shopping Center (1953–1962); Northway Mall (1962–2005); The Shoppes at Northway (2005–2015)
- Developer: LRC Realty and Pinpoint Retail; The James W. Rouse Co. (enclosed mall)
- Manager: LRC Realty
- Owner: LRC Realty
- Architect: Victor Gruen Associates
- Num. of stores: 30+
- Num. of anchor tenants: 9
- Floor area: 467,848 sq ft (43,464.5 m^{2})
- Floors: 2
- Parking: 1,884 spaces (outdoor and enclosed)
- Public transit: Port Authority bus: 12, O12, P13
- Website: Official website

The Block Northway is a shopping mall in Ross Township, Allegheny County, Pennsylvania, United States. It is located at the corner of McKnight Road and Babcock Boulevard, just north of Ross Park Mall. LRC Realty, an Akron, Ohio-based real estate developer, redeveloped and redesigned the mall into the present-day configuration as a shopping and entertainment mall anchored by Dave & Buster's, Nordstrom Rack, Saks Off 5th, Bassett Furniture, Marshalls, DSW, Ulta Beauty and PetSmart.

== History ==
=== Northway Shopping Center/Northway Mall ===
The Block Northway began as a strip mall called Northway Shopping Center, which opened in 1953. In 1962, The Rouse Company, then led by James W. Rouse, enclosed the existing strip, thus creating the renamed Northway Mall. This renovation made Northway Mall the first enclosed shopping mall in the state of Pennsylvania. The original mall also included an aviary on the upper floor atrium, which was removed in 1994.

=== The Shoppes at Northway ===
In 1995, the mall was renovated by McNeil Real Estate of Dallas, Texas, which owned the center at the time. It was then sold to the Archon Group (also of Dallas), who put the mall up for sale again in 2000. At the time, the mall was at 94% occupancy. When occupancy declined, plans were announced to convert the mall's enclosed upper level to a strip center. Under the plan, the mall was renamed to The Shoppes at Northway, which took place in 2005. This construction eliminated the discount movie theater. In 2007, new tenants were announced for the Shoppes at Northway, including a shoe store and a family play center. For a time in 2007, the mall became the only one in the United States to have two Party City locations operating independently of one another. Value City and Old Navy closed in 2008, while the family play center (the Kid Company, which replaced the food court) existed only briefly.

Borders closed its store at Northway in 2011 in response to the company's liquidation. Dick's Sporting Goods closed its Shoppes at Northway location on April 8, 2014 as a result of the store's relocation to McCandless Crossing.

As of October 2014, much of the upper level was empty, consisting only of Marshall's and Shoe Carnival. The lower level was in a similarly depressed state, with PetSmart, Northway Shoe and Repair, a music performance instruction school and a hair salon. A number of spaces, such as three former Party City locations, Ritz Camera, and Csonka Optical storefronts, remained vacant.

Mamma Lucia's, an Italian restaurant located in the mall since 1974, announced their intentions to close effective December 31, 2014. Repurposed, a second-hand merchandise store, also announced their intention not to renew their lease, which expired in late 2014.

=== The Block Northway ===
LRC Realty, the owner of the mall since December 2012, announced their intention to renovate and redevelop the mall. The mall will stay open during construction, which was expected to last until early 2018. Under the redevelopment, the mall was to be renamed Northway Collection, before becoming The Block Northway. As of December 2017, construction on the major mall areas, such as the north corridor, south atrium, and the 100-space enclosed parking garage, is complete. Dave & Buster's opened on February 18, 2019.
