= Frazer Township, Allegheny County, Pennsylvania =

Township in Pennsylvania, US

Frazer Township
- Township
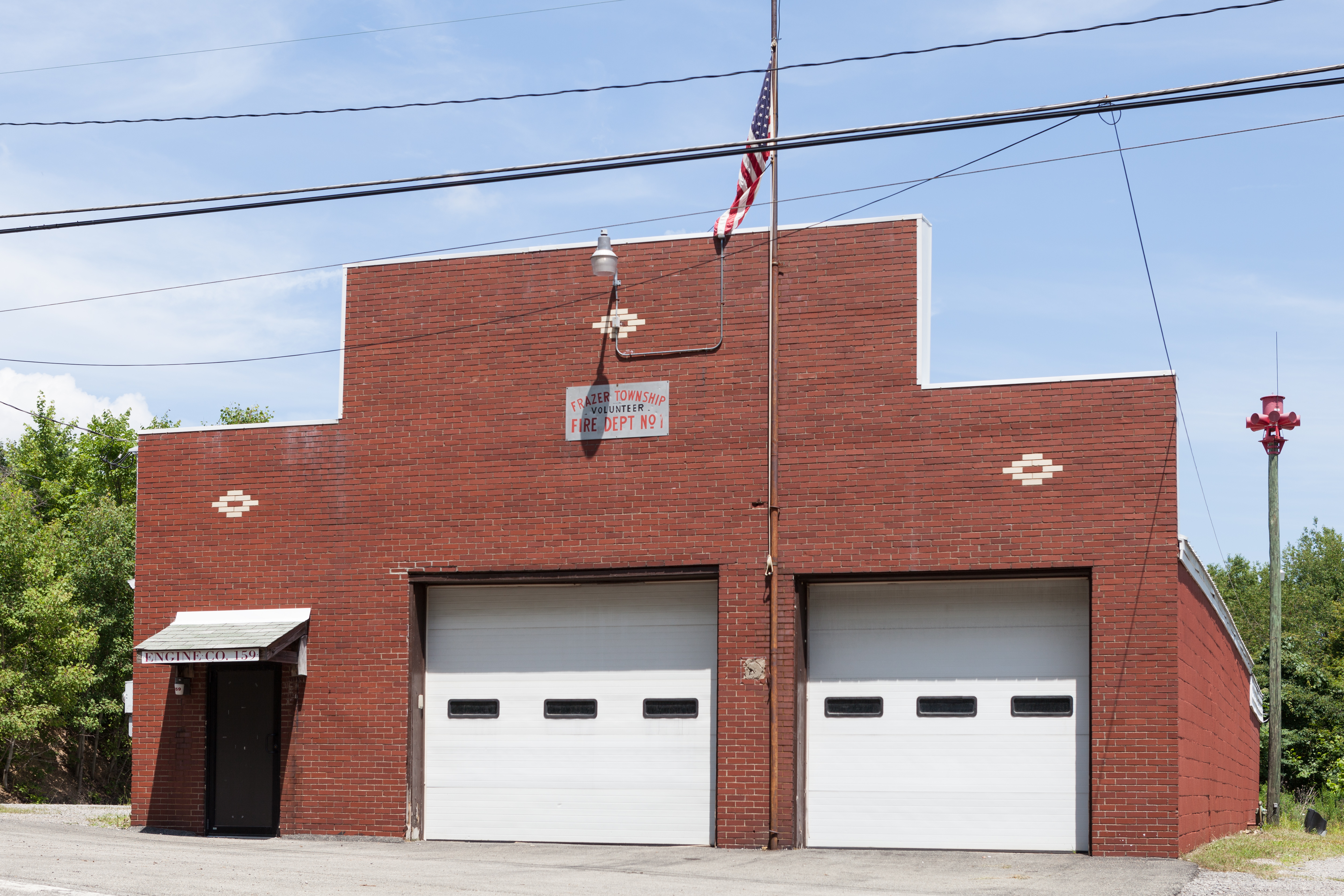
- Frazer Volunteer Fire Department Station 1, 2020 Bakerstown Road
- Interactive map of Frazer Township
- Location within Pennsylvania Location within the United States
- Coordinates: 40°36′25″N 79°47′34″W
- Country: United States
- State: Pennsylvania
- County: Allegheny

Area
  - Total: 9.34 sq mi (24.20 km^{2})
  - Land: 9.34 sq mi (24.20 km^{2})
  - Water: 0 sq mi (0.00 km^{2})

Population (2020)
  - Total: 1,164 ▲
  - Estimate (2022): 1,137
  - Density: 122.5/sq mi (47.31/km^{2})
- Time zone: UTC-5 (EST)
  - Summer (DST): UTC-4 (EDT)
- ZIP code: 15084
- Area code: 724
- FIPS code: 42-003-27608
- Website: https://frazertownship.net/

Frazer Township is a township in Allegheny County, Pennsylvania, United States. The population was 1,164 at the 2020 census. The Galleria at Pittsburgh Mills shopping mall complex and The Village at Pittsburgh Mills a grocery-anchored regional shopping destination is located in the township. The Wagman Observatory which is located in Deer Lakes Park, is also in Frazer.

Organized in 1914, Frazer Township was named for Robert S. Frazer, a state politician.

== Geography ==
According to the United States Census Bureau, the township has a total area of 9.4 square miles (24 km^{2}), all land.

=== Surrounding neighborhoods ===
Frazer Township has seven borders, including Fawn Township from the north to the east, Tarentum and East Deer Township to the southeast, Springdale Township to the south, Harmar Township to the southwest, and Indiana and West Deer Townships to the west.

== Demographics ==
Historical population
Census	Pop.	Note	%±
1970	1,887		—
1980	1,509		−20.0%
1990	1,388		−8.0%
2000	1,286		−7.3%
2010	1,157		−10.0%
2020	1,164		0.6%
2022 (est.)	1,137		−2.3%
U.S. Decennial Census

As of the 2000 census, there were 1,286 people, 527 households, and 383 families living in the township. The population density was 137.2 inhabitants per square mile (53.0/km^{2}). There were 569 housing units at an average density of 60.7 per square mile (23.4/km^{2}). The racial makeup of the township was 99.53% White, 0.08% African American, 0.16% Asian, 0.08% from other races, and 0.16% from two or more races. Hispanic or Latino of any race were 0.08% of the population.

There were 527 households, out of which 23.9% had children under the age of 18 living with them, 63.2% were married couples living together, 6.1% had a female householder with no husband present, and 27.3% were non-families. 23.9% of all households were made up of individuals, and 9.7% had someone living alone who was 65 years of age or older. The average household size was 2.44 and the average family size was 2.88.

In the township the population was spread out, with 19.0% under the age of 18, 6.5% from 18 to 24, 27.0% from 25 to 44, 26.7% from 45 to 64, and 20.9% who were 65 years of age or older. The median age was 44 years. For every 100 females, there were 101.6 males. For every 100 females age 18 and over, there were 98.5 males.

The median income for a household in the township was $40,515, and the median income for a family was $47,763. Males had a median income of $38,500 versus $24,643 for females. The per capita income for the township was $18,937. About 4.6% of families and 6.5% of the population were below the poverty line, including 14.5% of those under age 18 and 3.3% of those age 65 or over.

== Government and politics ==
Presidential election results
Year	Republican	Democratic	Third parties
2020	66% 447	32% 217	0.7% 5
2016	66% 387	31% 185	3% 17
2012	60% 319	39% 211	1% 6

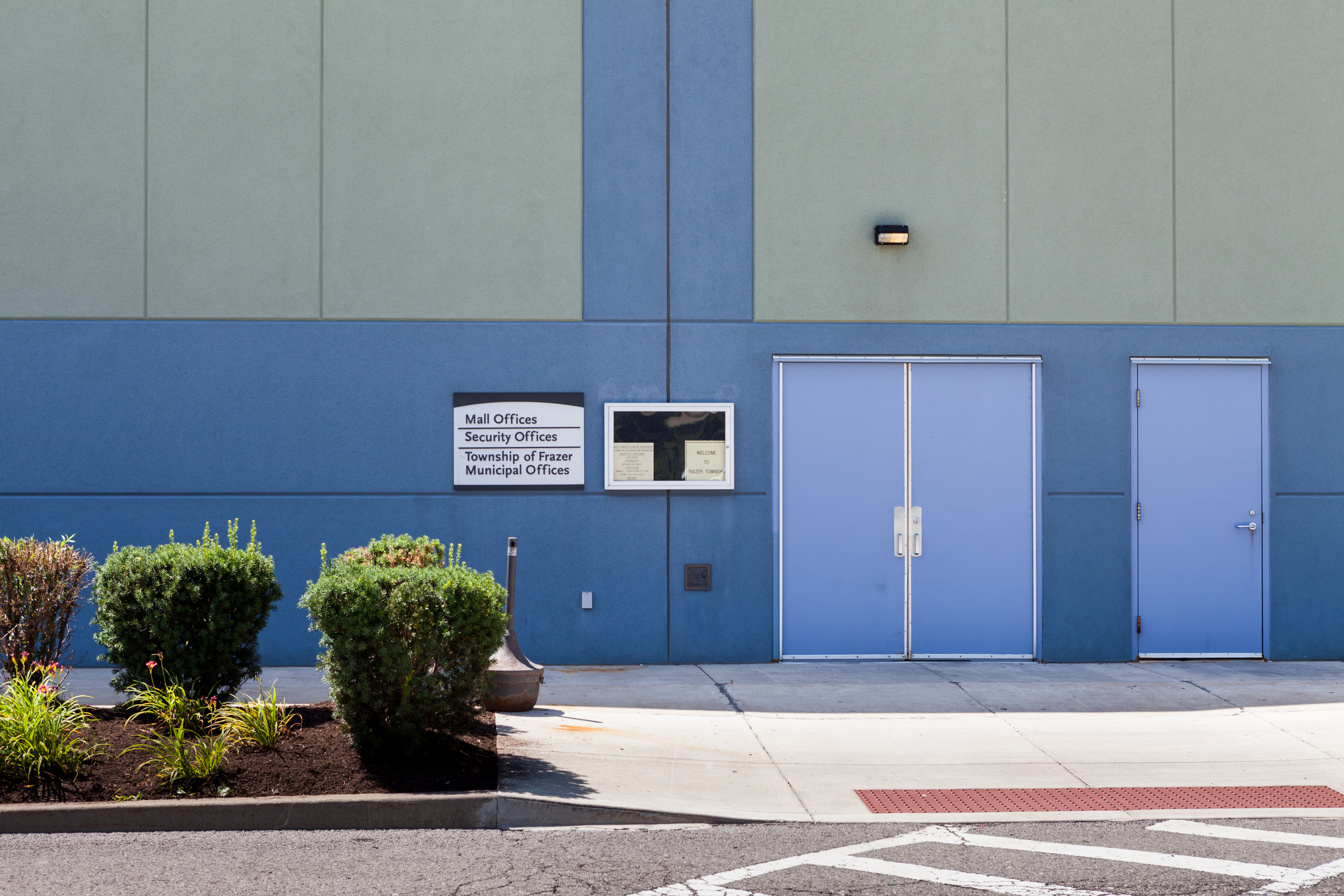
Municipal Offices, Frazer Township, Pennsylvania

== Notable location ==
- Tiger Ranch Cat Sanctuary
