= Richlands Mall =

Shopping mall in Virginia, United States

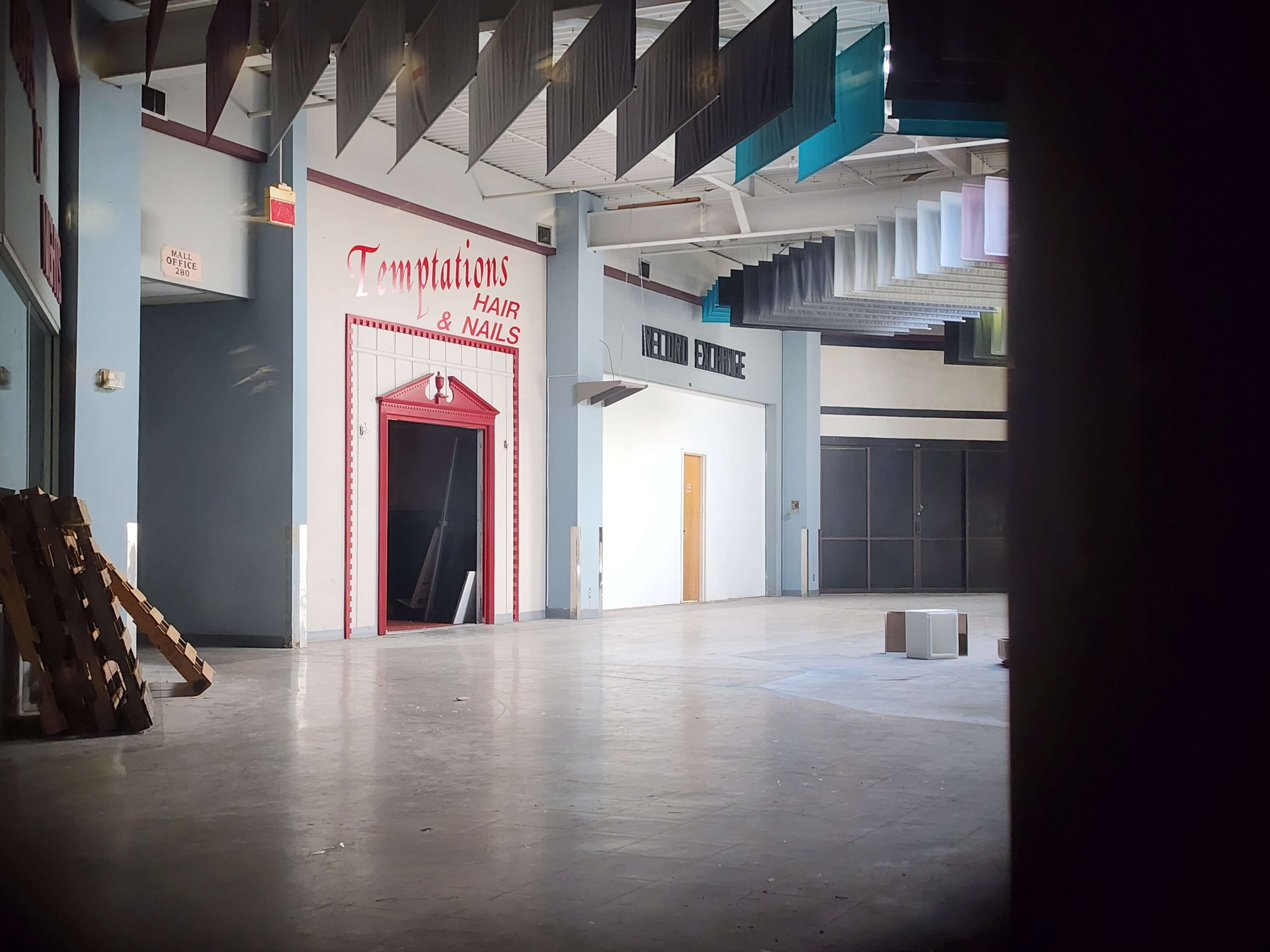
- Closed interior of the Richlands Mall in 2024
- Location: Richlands, Virginia, United States
- Coordinates: 37.0931°N 81.8213°W
- Opened: October 1980
- Developer: GG Industries, inc. and Tazewell Industries
- Owner: Coldwell Banker Commercial BRE
- Num. of anchor tenants: 2
- Floor area: 148,216 sq ft (13,769.7 m^{2})
- Floors: 1
- Website: fletcherbright.com/shopping-centers/va/107

Richlands Mall is a shopping mall located in Tazewell County, Virginia. The mall is anchored by Grant's Supermarket and Roses.

== History ==
Richlands Mall was announced in 1979 by Atlanta-based group GG Industries inc. Operating under a subsidiary known as Tazewell Associates, they would develop the shopping center, which was to be the first air conditioned mall in the region. The mall was to be roughly 162,000 square feet, and feature a supermarket, a drug store, a restaurant, and 35,000 square feet of other interior tenant space. In addition, a garment facility would occupy over 20,000 square feet of space at the mall. It was estimated that the mall would employ about 350 people, and generate $20 million in sales.

The mall was retrofitted from an old textile mill known as the Eastern Isles Manufacturing Plant, which was located on Front Street across from the Clinch Valley community hospital.

The property would be completed, and opened to the public in October 1980. Roses, Kroger and Eckerd Drug anchored the mall, with interior tenants Sidney's, Pic' N Pay, Western Steer Restaurant, Twin Cinema and Baskin Robbins present at opening, among others.

In 1987, both of the Eckerd Drug locations in the area, including the one in Richlands Mall, were rebranded as SupeRx drug stores.

=== 1990s ===
In January 1991, a new restaurant would open at the mall, named 'The Fig Tree.' Their menu consisted of a variety of foods, from Mexican cuisine, to steaks, shrimp and more. The Fig Tree was named because of the twisted fig trees located throughout the mall during the time.

The SupeRx Drug Store inside the mall would become Revco drug in 1994. Then, in September 1998, Revco drug would become CVS Pharmacy, announced by public notice in the newspaper.

=== 2000s ===
It was announced at the beginning of March 2000 that Kroger would close its doors on March 24 of the same year, citing underperformance.
