= Waterworks Shopping Plaza =

- Location: Pittsburgh, Allegheny County, Pennsylvania
- Coordinates: 40.488°N 79.89°W
- Opened: 1982
- Floor area: 914,638 square feet (84,972.7 m^{2})
- Public transit: Port Authority bus: 1, 75, 91

Waterworks Shopping Mall is an outdoor super-regional shopping mall located on Freeport Road in the city limits of Pittsburgh, Pennsylvania, United States. The center opened in 1982, and features a gross leasable area of 914,638 square feet (84,972.7 m^{2}). It is managed by J.J. Gumberg Co. of Pittsburgh, Pennsylvania. Anchor stores include Barnes & Noble, Dunham's Sports, Giant Eagle, Marshalls, Petco, and TJ Maxx; the mall also features several smaller stores and restaurants, as well as a movie theater. Former anchor tenants include Bed Bath & Beyond, Phar-Mor, Sam Goody, Service Merchandise, and Walmart (previously Hills then Ames). Waterworks Shopping Plaza is home to more than 65 stores and services including food court such as Starbucks, Burgatory, Panera Bread, Uncle Sam's Subs, Five Guys Burgers, Aladdin's Eatery, Italian Village Pizza, Ichiban Hibachi & Sushi Bar, Mad Mex, Subway. On October 24, 2022, it was announced that Walmart would be closing on November 11 due to is past and present financial performance.

== Lawsuit ==
In April 2007, a woman and her 16-month-old baby were kidnapped at knife point in the mall. The woman was then forced to drive to Ohio, where she was repeatedly raped. As a result, the woman's family has filed a civil suit against the center's owner. The lawsuit was settled on Nov. 18, 2008.
