= Ross Park Mall =

Coordinates: 40.543°N 80.008°W

- Macy's Concourse Shops
- Location: Ross Township, Allegheny County, Pennsylvania, U.S.
- Opened: August 15, 1986; 40 years ago
- Developer: Melvin Simon & Associates
- Manager: Simon Property Group
- Owner: Simon Property Group
- Num. of stores: 170 (at peak)
- Num. of anchor tenants: 4
- Floor area: 1,236,523 square feet (114,877 m^{2})
- Floors: 2 (3 In Macy’s)
- Parking: Lighted lot
- Public transit: Port Authority bus: 2, 12
- Website: ross-park-mall.com

Ross Park Mall is an enclosed shopping mall located in Ross Township, Pennsylvania, United States, serving the Northern Pittsburgh area. The mall is anchored by Macy's, Nordstrom and Dick's House of Sport. Junior anchors include H&M, L.L. Bean, Crate & Barrel and Zara. The mall is home to some of Pittsburgh's high-end shopping destinations like, Louis Vuitton, Gucci, Tiffany & Co, and Burberry.

== History ==
=== Development ===
The mall opened on August 15, 1986. With original anchor stores JCPenney, Sears, and Kaufmann's, and Horne's. The Kaufmann's moved from their nearby stand-alone location on Mcknight Road. The space that opened as Horne's was originally planned to be Gimbels, but the location was sold back to Simon, who then leased it to Horne's. Following a 1994 acquisition, it became Lazarus, then rebranded to Macy’s in March 2005, just months before parent company Federated purchased rival Kaufmann’s.

=== 2000's and 2010's ===
In 2000, Ross Park Mall underwent $14 million in renovations including the construction of a play area for children near JCPenney as well as new lighting, ceilings, entrances and flooring.

In March 2006, Nordstrom announced plans to build a new store on the original Horne's site, opening in 2008. As well as Cheesecake Factory opening at the same time. Following the announcement, the existing Kaufmann's soon became the current Macy's store. Additional renovations were done in 2008 with the mall expansion. Some luxury retailers were also added to the mall, including Tiffany & Co, Burberry, and Louis Vuitton. In addition, a 65,000-square-foot (6,000 m^{2}) lifestyle expansion completed the 2008 remodel including Pittsburgh’s first L. L. Bean store.

In August 2010, seven new retailers announced they would open stores at the mall including the Apple Store and Crate & Barrel.

During the summer of 2019, JCPenney downsized to the first floor of the building, with offices on a portion of the second floor, while the rest is sealed off & vacant. On January 4, 2018, it was announced that the Sears anchor store would close.

=== 2020's - Present ===
On September 2, 2022 Psycho Bunny announced they would be making their Western-Pennsylvania debut, with a location at Ross Park Mall.On January 20, 2023 a Gucci store opened in the mall, the company's first location in Western Pennsylvania.On January 20, 2024 Hugo Boss announced they would open a store at the mall.The former Sears store reopened as Dick's House of Sport in April 2024.

On the Early morning of February 8, 2026, a fire broke out on the lower level entry way, next to Tory Burch. The fire was caused by sparks coming from rebar that was being cut. These sparks lead to the old cardboard sub-floor, and subsequently caught it on fire. It was extinguished later that morning, with Warby Parker sustaining the most damage.On May 27, 2026, it was announced that JCPenney would close its anchor store on September 20, 2026.On August 20, 2026, it was announced that Zara would be opening at the mall, in a combination of four vacant upper level spaces, and a portion of the upper level of the empty JCPenney.

== Gallery ==
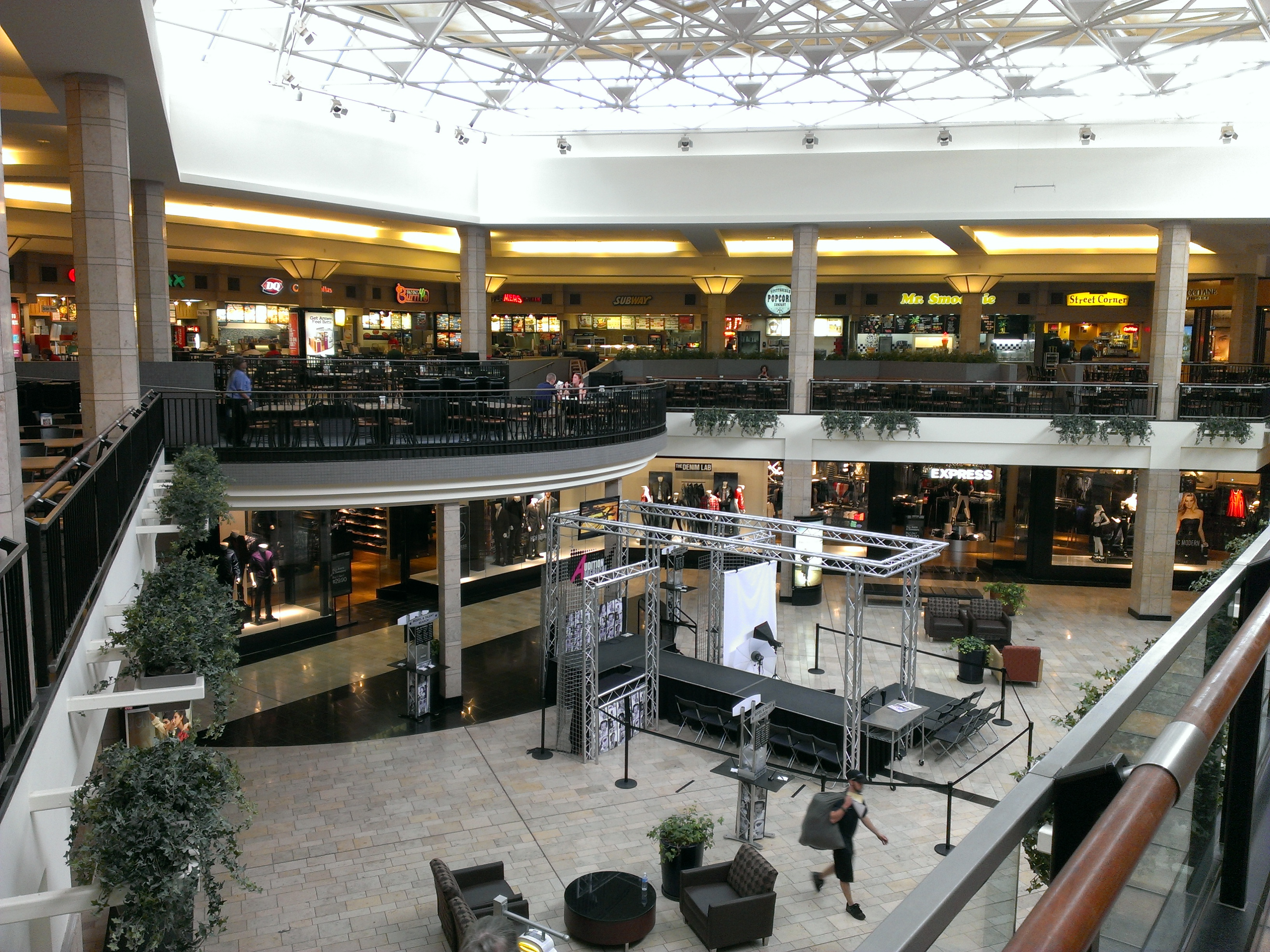
View of the center court, on the lower level, and the food court on the upper level.

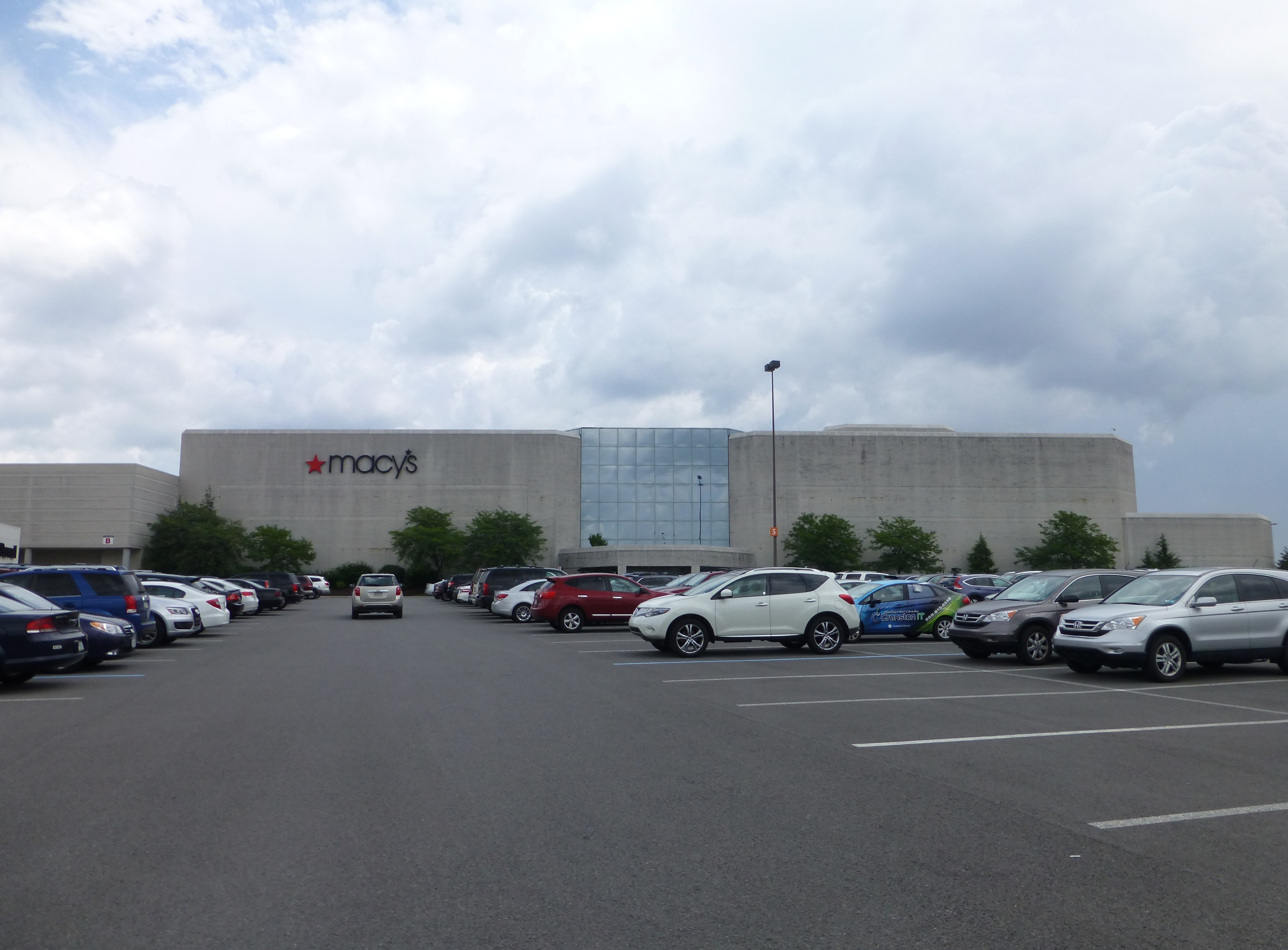
Exterior of Macy's.

Upper level view of Dick's concourse.Cache, Apple Store, Victoria's Secret visible.

L.L. Bean location. Opened in 2008.
