= Kohan Retail Investment Group =

American real estate investment trust

- Type: Private
- Industry: Retail, real estate
- Founder: Mike Kohan (Note: Uses several aliases including Mike Kohen, Mehan Kohansiek, Mehran Kohansieh, Mehran Kohansiek, and Mehrzad I. Kohansieh.)
- Headquarters: Great Neck, New York, United States
- Number of locations: 28 properties
- Products: Shopping malls
- Website: www.kohanretail.com

Kohan Retail Investment Group is a private real estate investment trust based in Great Neck, New York. The company's holdings primarily consist of shopping malls, particularly struggling properties in small-to-midsize markets. As of September 2025, the company owns 28 properties in 19 U.S. states.

Kohan has been referred to as "the last owner a mall sees", investing little in the malls it purchases and allowing mall facilities to deteriorate while selling off outparcels. The company has also attracted attention for delinquent tax and utility payments at many of its properties.

== History ==
Kohan bought Northland Mall from Developers Diversified Realty for $1.8 million in late December 2008. Kohan purchased the Jamestown Mall in 2009 for $3.3 million. Staunton Mall was purchased from bankrupt First Republic Realty for $4.05 million in November 2010. In April 2011, Warren Mall was sold by Zamias for $720,000, and in April 2016 was under the ownership of Cocca Development. Lincoln Mall was purchased during foreclosure for $150,000 in June 2012, with millions owed in fines and taxes from its previous owners. Crystal River Mall was purchased for $2.8 million in 2012, and would be sold to United Realty M.T.A. LLC in August 2016. Tiffin Mall, purchased in 2012, was later sold to Key Hotel and Property Management in 2016 for $2.2 million. Macerich sold Rotterdam Square Mall to Kohan for $8.5 million on January 15, 2014. Lake Square Mall was purchased in March 2014 for $13.28 million, but would be sold to Via Properties in September with Kohan remaining manager. Staunton Mall was sold for $4.5 million in March 2014. The Orchards Mall, purchased in 2014, was sold to Durga LLC in late 2018.

PREIT sold Lycoming Mall to Kohan for $26.35 million in March 2016, who owns it under the name Lycoming Mall Realty Holding. Washington Square Mall was purchased in April 2016 for $2.5 million. Chapel Hill Mall was purchased in July 2016 by Kohan for $8.6 million. Southbridge Mall during its tax sale was purchased by Kohan for $1.5 million in September 2016. Also in September 2016, Kohan purchased Berkshire Mall for $3.5 million. Richmond Town Square was purchased for $7.25 million in November 2016. Kohan purchased six malls in 2018 for $46 million. VF Factory Outlet Mall closed in October 2017. Part of Eastland Center was purchased in 2018 for $3.125 million. Prescott Gateway Mall was sold to Kohan for $8.8 million in February 2018, half of what the previous owners purchased it for. Towne Square Mall and additional properties were purchased for $4 million in May 2018. The Esplanade in June 2018 was purchased by Kohan for $9.25 million. Valle Vista Mall was purchased for $12.5 million in mid-2018. Fort Steuben Mall was purchased for $10.75 million in December 2018.

Parts of Marquette, Michigan's Westwood Mall was sold to two different owners in February 2019, one being Kohan. Berkshire Mall was sold to Durga Property Holdings for $1 million in July 2019. Towne West Square was purchased for $14 million in July 2019. Towne Square Mall was sold for $5.15 million to Towne Square Mall Holdings LLC in December 2019. Village Square Mall was sold to Durga Property Holdings in early 2020. Ashtabula Towne Square and other properties was purchased for $10.2 million in February 2020. Ownership of the Seminole Towne Center was transferred to Kohan in March 2020. Virginia Center Commons was sold to VCC Partners LLC and Shamin VCC LLC in early 2020 for $8.3 million. Kohan later sold another Virginia Center Commons anchor building for $4.1 million to Impact Investments Group LLC in April 2020. Clearview Mall in Butler, PA was taken over by Kohan in June 2020. Findlay Village Mall was sold to Kohan for $4 million in September 2020. Kohan purchased the Burnsville Center's debt at auction for $18 million in October 2020.

The Outlets of Little Rock were purchased for $10 million in January 2021. Central Mall Lawton was sold to Lawton, Oklahoma for $14.6 million in January 2021. Prizm Outlets was purchased by Kohan at auction for $1.525 million in January 2021. Kohan purchased both the Birchwood Mall and Westwood Mall in February 2021, paying $5.6 million for Birchwood. Chapel Hill Mall was sold by Kohan to Industrial Commercial Properties in March 2021. Lansing Mall was purchased for $9.2 million in March 2021. Oak View Mall was purchased for $7.5 million in April 2021. McKinley Mall was sold to Kohan for $8.5 million in July 2021 despite protests from local business and government about the sale price. Wyoming Valley Mall was sold to Kohan for $17 million in August 2021. Kohan purchased the Triangle Town Center for $33.25 million in November 2021. Montgomery Mall while in foreclosure was purchased for $55 million in November 2021.

The Crossroads in Portage, Michigan was purchased by Kohan in January 2022 for $25 million. NorthTown Mall was purchased for $49 million in February 2022. Part of the Burnsville Center was sold to Pacific Square Burnsville LLC for $10.6 million in February 2022. Fort Steuben Mall was sold by Kohan to Brookwood Capital in February 2022. Brass Mill Center and Brass City Commons was sold to Kohan for $44.9 million in April 2022. Indiana Mall was purchased in April 2022 for $6.9 million. Fashion Square Mall was purchased at auction in September 2022 for $10.8 million. In November 2022, PREIT sold Cumberland Mall to Kohan Retail Investment Group for $45 million. The Mall at Robinson was purchased for $46 million from QIC in November 2022. Santa Fe Place was acquired in January 2023. In March 2023, Fairlane Town Center was sold to the Kohan Retail Investment Group. Kohan then bought Lima Mall for $12 million in April 2023. Southern Park Mall was purchased by Kohan for $24.1 million in December 2024. In 2025, Collin Mertz, a manager at Touchdown Gifts located inside Southern Park Mall reported he was hung up on by Kohan employees multiple times after inquiring about Southern Park.

== Controversies ==
=== Poor material conditions ===
Woodville Mall which was purchased by Kohan in 2009, was closed in December 2011 by court order and demolished in March 2014 due to its poor material condition.

Lincoln Mall suffered from serious material condition issues during Kohan's ownership and in August 2013 went into receivership. The municipal government of Matteson, Illinois took over ownership in June 2014 and it closed in January 2015 after running out of money. At the malls closure, over $10 million in fines and taxes was owed to Matteson by Kohan. Lincoln Mall was demolished starting in May 2017.

During a 2013 police drug search, serious issues were discovered in Northland Mall's former Kmart that included mold, roof damage, and other major issues. Ownership also owed $141,081.61 in taxes to Nobles County, Minnesota. The mall had serious material condition issues in April 2014 that Worthington, Minnesota took action on. Worthington won a court decision about the former Kmart in June 2014, and demolition began in February 2015. The mall was sold to 7&41 LLC in May 2015.

Mayberry Mall was almost closed on February 1, 2018, by local government officials due to roof and mold issues. It was sold to WRS Inc. Real Estate Investments in 2019.

Due to the roof's poor condition, Effingham City declared Village Square Mall unsafe in August 2018.

Adrian Mall in March 2020 was almost condemned due to electrical, roof, and structural issues. It was later condemned in June 2020 due to numerous serious issues.

In September 2023, Tulsa Promenade in Tulsa, Oklahoma was closed permanently after Kohan refused to remedy ongoing fire code violations in the property.

=== Delinquent utility payments ===
Due to lack of payment on a $300,000 bill, Rotterdam Square Mall lost power on February 12, 2015. The mall was later sold to ViaPort USA for $9.25 million.

Indian River Mall almost lost power in December 2017 due to unpaid electric bills and bounced checks totaling $428,175. The bill was paid the day electric was to be shutoff.

Due to Kohan not paying Lycoming Mall's PPL electric bill, it lost power in late August 2018.

Chapel Hill Mall almost had power disconnected by Ohio Edison due to unpaid bills in April and December 2019.

In February 2023, the Aroostook Centre Mall in Presque Isle, Maine was closed after Kohan's local employee advised tenants that Kohan had not been paying utility bills and he was unable to get in contact with the corporate office.

In June 2023, Towne West Square in Wichita, Kansas was served a disconnect notice by Evergy Electric Co. due to non-payment of their electric bill. Power was shut off for one day in September of the same year, forcing the mall's tenants to close. Power was shut off again in November. In December 2023, water service was shut off to parts of the mall due to unpaid utility bills owed to the city.

In July 2023, Kohan's efforts to sell the Colonial Park Mall fell through due to an outstanding debt of $320,000 owed to the Lower Paxton Township Authority for unpaid sewer charges, stormwater fees, and others. A sheriff's sale on the delinquent utility charges was averted when Kohan paid 25 minutes before the deadline.

In November 2023, power was shut off at Marshalltown Mall in Marshalltown, Iowa due to Kohan remaining delinquent on their power bill owed to Alliant Energy, forcing their tenants inside the mall to close and many with external entrances to relocate due to fire safety codes. As of August 2024, power has still not been restored, due to both unpaid bills and unresolved fire code violations.

In February 2024, power was shut off at Seminole Towne Center due to Kohan being delinquent on their power bill owed to Florida Power & Light, forcing their tenants to close and causing a loss of parking lot lighting. The power was turned back on three days later.

In March 2024, June 2024, and July 2024, power was shut off at The Westwood Mall in Marquette, Michigan, due to Kohan being repeatedly delinquent on their power bill owed to the Marquette Board of Light and Power.

In May 2024, notice was posted on the Fairlane Town Center in Dearborn, Michigan that Kohan was delinquent on their electric and gas bill due to DTE Energy, but payment was made in time to avoid a shutoff.

In August 2024, Valley View Mall in La Crosse, Wisconsin was closed for four days after Kohan failed to pay the property's electric bill.

On January 28, 2025, a notice appeared on all mall entrances of Town Center at Cobb, a property owned and managed by Kohan, stating the mall will be closed until further notice due to "unforeseen circumstances." It was later reported Georgia Power, the property's electrical service provider, had disconnected service to the property due to their "highly delinquent" bills. A Georgia Power spokesperson said, "We provided advance notice regarding this disconnection to mall management, as well as tenants, by delivering letters in person and placing signage onsite. We also made key community leaders aware."

=== Delinquent tax payments ===
Since its purchase, Berkshire Mall has suffered from serious tax issues with many payments being missed. Kohan has been taken to court several times over these issues and has narrowly avoided Berkshire's seizure. Berkshire has also suffered from a series of power outages.

Kohan owed $627,789 in property taxes on the Washington Square Mall in 2017, and the mall was put up for tax sale. The mall's outstanding taxes were paid off in October 2018 for $1.1 million.

In August 2018, Kohan sued Clay, New York for a reduction in the Great Northern Mall's taxes while owing $1.53 million to county government.

In September 2018, Southbridge Mall was sued by Cerro Gordo County for $177,324 in back taxes. Those taxes were paid off in December 2018, with three of the previous four checks sent to the county bouncing.

Kohan owed around $550,000 on The Orchards Mall in various taxes before its sale in late 2018.

Lycoming County Water and Sewer Authority placed Lycoming Mall on the February 2019 sheriff's sale list due to unpaid bills. Kohan made a partial payment to stop the auction. The mall was placed on the sheriff's sale list again in May 2022; Kohan paid almost $300,000 in unpaid bills and fees to avoid the sheriff's sale.

Chapel Hill Mall in January 2020 was foreclosed on by Summit County, Ohio for owing $753,732.82 in real estate taxes. The mall also had electric and water payment issues the same month.

Kohan in March 2021 owed $320,000 in back taxes on The Esplanade. During Jefferson Parish, Louisiana's investigation, it was discovered that additional taxes from 1992 were not paid on the vacant Macy's anchor building, resulting in Kohan owing another $480,000. Parts of the property later went up for tax sale, were not sold, and the assets transferred to Jefferson Parish. The mall would close in later 2021 due to the effects of Hurricane Ida.

Great Northern Mall was closed for month in January and February 2022 due to repairs for frozen pipes. Kohan also owes almost $5 million in back taxes on the property.

A June 2023 investigation by the Orlando Business Journal reported that Kohan was delinquent on property taxes for four properties: approximately $800,000 on Seminole Towne Center in Sanford, Florida, $355,000 on Central Mall in Port Arthur, Texas, over $1 million on Midland Mall in Midland, Texas, and $560,000 on Colonial Park Mall in Lower Paxton Township, Pennsylvania.

In June 2023, it was reported that Kohan was delinquent on two years of back taxes on Towne West Square.

In August 2024, WLUC-TV reported that Kohan was delinquent on $306,000 of property taxes related to The Westwood Mall.

In May 2024, the Detroit Free Press reported that Kohan was delinquent on $2.1 million in property taxes for Fairlane Town Center.

In March 2025, about 2 months after the Town Center at Cobb had its power shut off for unpaid electrical bills, Kohan settled an outstanding property taxes case to prevent the Mall from being auctioned off by Cobb County, Georgia.

In April 2025, WFMJ-TV reported that Kohan was delinquent on first half taxes for the Southern Park Mall, with approximately $480,000 owed between taxes and an additional 10% penalty for non-payment. Interest is being accrued on the debt. This subsequently increased to approximately $520,000 in back taxes and nearly $50,000 in penalties by May. In June, payment for these owed taxes failed due to "insufficient funds".

=== Foreclosures ===
Kohan lost the Jamestown Mall in late 2011 due to foreclosure, but retained some ownership in late 2012. The mall had previously declared bankruptcy in August 2011.

Tulsa Promenade was placed into receivership in July 2019 due to missed mortgage payments and maintenance issues. Kohan resumed ownership of the mall in September.

=== Other controversies ===
In December 2022, Kohan was sued by the executive director of a nonprofit organization, who alleged that the company refused to honor a promised monetary contribution in exchange for professional services he performed at Seminole Towne Center in Sanford, Florida. In the filing, it was also alleged that Kohan's representatives maliciously defamed him to city officials in retaliation for his demand to be paid for the services rendered. A default judgment was awarded in March 2023 when Kohan's representatives failed to appear in court.

In June 2023, eleven employees at Towne West Square reported that salary checks from Kohan bounced.

In July 2024, Kohan was accused of willfully destroying video evidence concerning an injury which took place at Seminole Towne Center in June 2022.

== List of mall properties ==
Mall properties owned by Kohan Retail Investment Group as of 2026 include:

- Anderson Mall, Anderson, South Carolina
- Animas Valley Mall, Farmington, New Mexico
- Arnot Mall, Big Flats, New York
- Asheville Mall, Asheville, North Carolina
- Birchwood Mall, Fort Gratiot Township, Michigan
- Brass Mill Center, Waterbury, Connecticut
- Chautauqua Mall, Lakewood, New York
- Cumberland Mall, Vineland, New Jersey
- Eastridge Mall, Casper, Wyoming
- Fashion Square Mall, Saginaw, Michigan
- Gadsden Mall, Gadsden, Alabama
- Holiday Village Mall, Havre, Montana
- Indiana Mall, Indiana, Pennsylvania
- Jasper Mall, Jasper, Alabama
- Killeen Mall, Killeen, Texas
- Lansing Mall, Lansing, Michigan
- Lufkin Mall, Lufkin, Texas
- The Mall at Robinson, Robinson Township, Pennsylvania
- The Mall at Sierra Vista, Sierra Vista, Arizona
- Marshalltown Mall, Marshalltown, Iowa
- McKinley Mall, Buffalo, New York
- Morgantown Mall, Morgantown, West Virginia
- New Towne Mall, New Philadelphia, Ohio
- Northwoods Mall, Peoria, Illinois
- Pecanland Mall, Monroe, Louisiana
- River Hills Mall, Mankato, Minnesota
- Rolling Oaks Mall, San Antonio, Texas
- Santa Fe Place, Santa Fe, New Mexico
- Sikes Senter, Wichita Falls, Texas
- Southern Hills Mall, Sioux City, Iowa
- Southern Park Mall, Boardman, Ohio
- SouthPark Mall, Moline, Illinois
- Temple Mall, Temple, Texas
- Valle Vista Mall, Harlingen, Texas
- Valley View Mall, La Crosse, Wisconsin
- Vicksburg Mall, Vicksburg, Mississippi
- Washington Park Mall, Bartlesville, Oklahoma
- Westwood Mall, Jackson, Michigan
- The Westwood Mall, Marquette, Michigan

== List of properties with unclear ownership ==
- Adrian Mall, Adrian, Michigan (Note: No longer listed on the Kohan website as of November 2022.)
- Livingston Mall, Livingston, New Jersey

== List of former mall properties ==
Properties previously owned by Kohan Retail Investment Group as of 2024 include:

- Almeda Mall, Houston, Texas
- Aroostook Centre Mall, Presque Isle, Maine
- Berkshire Mall, Lanesborough, Massachusetts
- Burnsville Center, Burnsville, Minnesota
- Central Mall Lawton, Lawton, Oklahoma
- Central Mall Port Arthur, Port Arthur, Texas
- Central Mall Texarkana, Texarkana, Texas
- The Centre at Salisbury, Salisbury, Maryland
- Chapel Hill Mall, Akron, Ohio
- Crystal River Mall, Crystal River, Florida
- Clearview Mall, Butler, Pennsylvania
- Colonial Park Mall, Lower Paxton Township, Pennsylvania
- Eastland Center, Harper Woods, Michigan
- The Esplanade, Kenner, Louisiana
- Fort Steuben Mall, Steubenville, Ohio
- Findlay Village Mall, Findlay, Ohio
- Graceville Outlet Mall, Graceville, Florida
- Great Northern Mall, Clay, New York
- Indian River Mall, Vero Beach, Florida
- Jamestown Mall, Florissant, Missouri
- Killeen Mall, Killeen, Texas
- Lake Square Mall, Leesburg, Florida
- Lincoln Mall, Matteson, Illinois
- Lycoming Mall, Pennsdale, Pennsylvania
- Lima Mall, American Township, Ohio
- Mayberry Mall, Mount Airy, North Carolina
- Miami Valley Centre Mall, Piqua, Ohio
- Midland Mall, Midland, Michigan
- Montgomery Mall, North Wales, Pennsylvania
- Northland Mall (Minnesota), Worthington, Minnesota
- North Plains Mall, Clovis, New Mexico
- Oak View Mall, Omaha, Nebraska
- Outlets of Little Rock, Little Rock, Arkansas
- Prizm Outlets, Primm, Nevada
- Richmond Town Square, Richmond Heights, Ohio
- Rotterdam Square Mall, Rotterdam, New York
- The Shoppes at Bel Air, Mobile, Alabama
- Savannah Mall, Savannah, Georgia
- Spring Hill Mall, West Dundee, Illinois
- Seminole Towne Center, Sanford, Florida
- Staunton Mall, Staunton, Virginia
- Story City Outlet Mall (VF Factory Outlet Mall), Story City, Iowa
- Southbridge Mall, Mason City, Iowa
- The Crossroads, Portage, Michigan
- The Shoppes at Riverside (formerly South Shore Mall), Aberdeen, Washington
- The Orchards Mall, Benton Harbor, Michigan
- Town Center at Cobb, Kennesaw, Georgia
- Tiffin Mall, Tiffin, Ohio
- Towne Square Mall, Owensboro, Kentucky
- Triangle Town Center, Raleigh, North Carolina
- Towne West Square, Wichita, Kansas
- Tulsa Promenade, Tulsa, Oklahoma
- Village Square Mall, Effingham, Illinois
- Virginia Center Commons, Glen Allen, Virginia
- Warren Mall, Warren, Pennsylvania
- Westland Mall, West Burlington, Iowa
- Washington Crown Center, Washington, Pennsylvania
- West Ridge Mall, Topeka, Kansas
- Wyoming Valley Mall, Wilkes-Barre Township, Pennsylvania
- Washington Square Mall, Indianapolis, Indiana
- Woodville Mall, Northwood, Ohio

== List of hotels ==
Mall properties hotels by Kohan Retail Investment Group as of 2022 include:

- Shoreham Hotel, New York, New York
- The Gallivant Times Square, New York, New York

== See also ==
- Namdar Realty Group, a similar company
