= Central Mall =

Central Mall is the name of several shopping malls:

- Central Mall (Fort Smith, Arkansas)
- Central Mall (Port Arthur, Texas)
- Central Mall (Texarkana, Texas)
- Treasure Island Next Mall, Indore, India, formerly known as Central Mall
- Central Plaza (Oklahoma), formerly Central Mall (Lawton, OK)

== See also ==
- Central (Hypermarket), a chain of malls in India
- Grand Central Mall in Vienna, West Virginia
- Park Central Mall in Phoenix, Arizona
