= Berkshire Mall =

Berkshire Mall can refer to the following:

- Berkshire Mall (Massachusetts)
- Berkshire Mall (Pennsylvania)
