= North Plains Mall =

Coordinates: 34.424°N 103.193°W

- Location: Clovis, New Mexico, United States
- Opened: October 16, 1985; 41 years ago
- Developer: Price Development
- Owner: Sam Mick
- Num. of stores: 23
- Num. of anchor tenants: 7 (6 open, 1 vacant)
- Floor area: 303,188 square feet (28,167.1 m^{2})
- Floors: 1

The North Plains Mall is an enclosed shopping mall in Clovis, New Mexico owned by Kohan Retail Investment Group. It is the only mall within its 95-mile radius and thus has drawn consumers across eastern New Mexico and west Texas. The mall is anchored by JCPenney, Big R, Marshalls, Ulta Beauty, Ross Dress For Less, and Shoe Dept. Encore, with one vacant anchor last occupied by Stage. At the time of the mall's 30th anniversary in 2015, it still had several original inline tenants. Price Development built the mall.

On September 15, 2017, it was announced that Sears would be closing in December 2017.

In May 2020, Dillard's permanently closed alongside 2 other locations at Crossroads Mall (Waterloo, Iowa) & Central Mall (Lawton, OK).

In July 2021, Kohan Retail Investment Group purchased the mall alongside 6 other malls from Brookfield Asset Management.

In February 2023, the North Plains Mall was sold to a Colorado based investor, Sam Mick, an investor for Big R, a farm supply store, alongside of the announcement of the opening of Big R, which had filled up the former Sears space at the mall.

Since the ownership change to Sam Mick, the former Dillard’s space had been subdivided for several tenants, including Shoe Dept. Encore, Ross Dress For Less, Marshalls, and Ulta Beauty.
