= Findlay Mall =

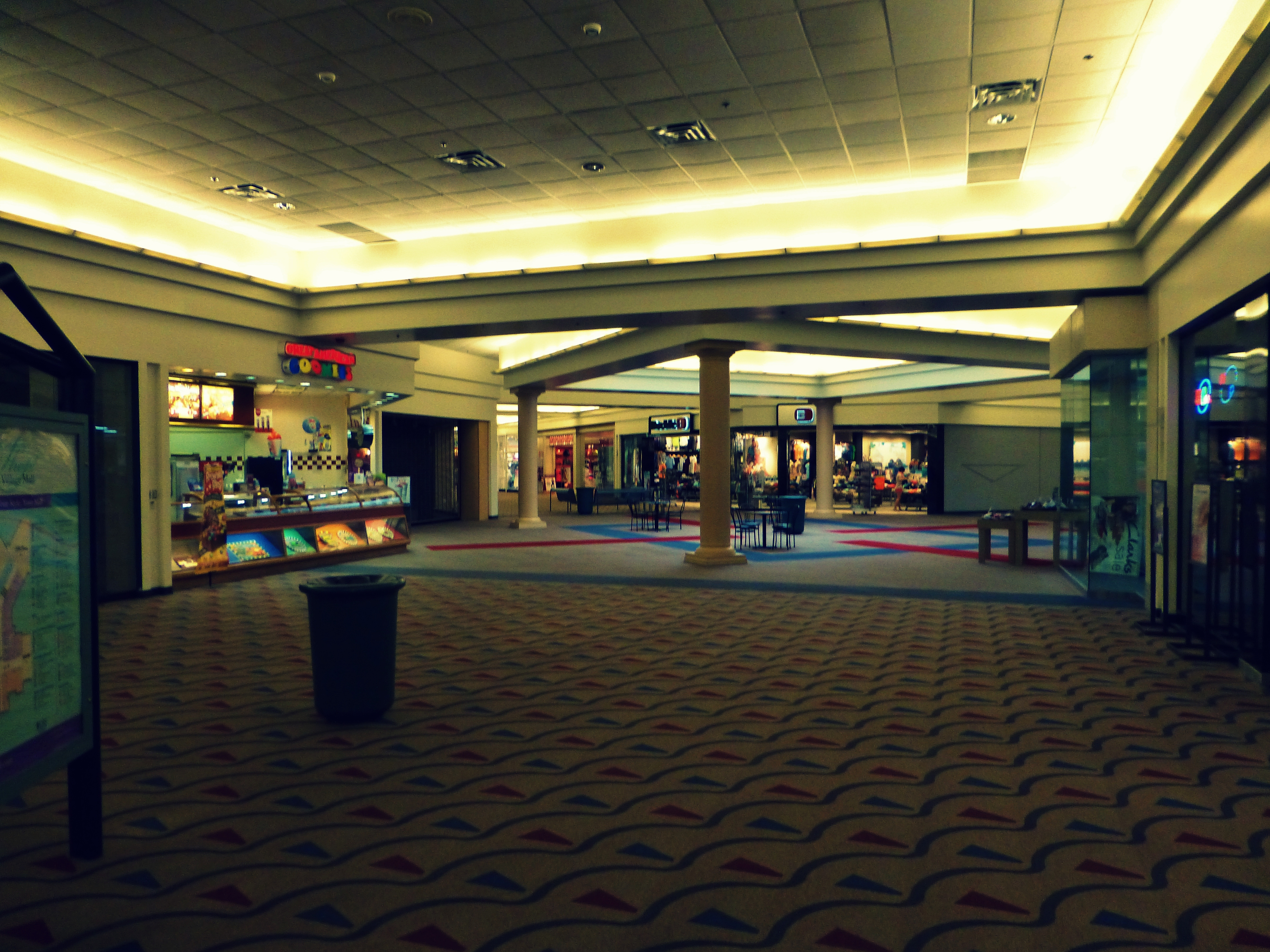
- Interior of Findlay Mall, 2014
- Location: Findlay, Ohio, U.S.
- Coordinates: 41°03′17″N 83°36′50″W
- Address: 1800 Tiffin Avenue, Findlay, OH, 45839
- Opened: 1962; 64 years ago
- Closed: January 31, 2025
- Previous names: Fort Findlay Village Shopping Center; Findlay Village Mall
- Developer: Edward J. DeBartolo Corporation
- Manager: Rocky Companies
- Owner: Rocky Companies
- Num. of stores: 100+ at peak
- Num. of anchor tenants: 3 (6 slots)
- Floor area: 537,319 sq ft (49,918.6 m^{2})
- Floors: 1
- Website: Official website

Findlay Mall (formerly known as Findlay Village Mall and Fort Findlay Village Shopping Center) was an enclosed shopping mall in Findlay, Ohio. Opened in 1962, it features Dunham's Sports, Runnings, and Best Buy as its anchor stores. It is owned by Rocky Companies. The mall closed on January 31, 2025 and demolition began in mid-2025 to prepare for the construction of a Target store.

== History ==
Developed by mall builder Edward J. DeBartolo, Sr., the mall opened in 1962 as Fort Findlay Village Shopping Center, featuring Britt's and JCPenney, followed by Sears. The mall was originally an outdoor mall, however, it was enclosed in 1974. The mall expanded from 334,000 square feet to over 525,000 square feet in 1990, adding a new Kmart and JCPenney store along with Elder-Beerman.

Kmart closed in 2003. A year later, the space was divided between TJ Maxx and Best Buy. A movie theater at the mall closed in 2010. In 2014, Sears announced that its store at the mall would close by April. In October 2016, it was announced Big R (later renamed Stock + Field) would fill the Sears vacancy in 2017. On March 17, 2017, JCPenney announced they would be closing the Findlay store. Elder-Beerman closed in August, 2018. TJ Maxx moved from the mall to a new location formerly occupied by a Staples.

In September 2020, the mall was sold to Kohan Retail Investment Group for $4 million.

On January 14, 2021, it was announced that Stock + Field would be closing as the chain is going out of business. Best Buy and Dunham's Sports would have been the only two remaining anchors. However, it was later announced that Stock+Field had been purchased by R.P.Lumber and the stores would remain open.

The mall closed in January 2025 and demolition on the mall began in mid-2025 to prepare for the construction of a 132,258-square-foot Target store.
