= Lake Square Mall =

- Location: Leesburg, Florida, United States
- Coordinates: 28.824986°N 81.784542°W
- Address: 10401 U.S. Route 441
- Opened: September 24, 1980; 46 years ago
- Developer: General Growth Properties
- Owner: Exclusive Management and Properties, Inc
- Num. of anchor tenants: 4 (2 open, 2 vacant)
- Floor area: 559,000 sq ft (51,900 m^{2})
- Floors: 1
- Public transit: LakeXpress bus: 1
- Website: lakesquaremall.com

Lake Square Mall (briefly known as ViaPort Florida) is the only shopping mall in Lake County, and is located in Leesburg, Florida, United States. Opened on September 24, 1980, it is managed by Exclusive Management and Properties. The mall's anchor stores are Belk and an entertainment center named Via Entertainment.

== History ==
The mall was built in 1980 by General Growth Properties, with Belk, J. C. Penney, and Sears as the anchor stores. An expansion comprising Target was first proposed in 1989, as part of an expansion that added ten new storefronts. Target opened in March 1992.

In 1995, the movie theater complex, owned by AMC Theatres, expanded from six screens to twelve. Also, Belk expanded its store into an adjacent storefront previously occupied by Rite Aid. A year later, the J. C. Penney store was remodeled, and a stage was removed from center court. Simon Property Group and Macerich bought the mall in 1997, just after Books-A-Million was added. PetSmart was added in 2011.

The closure of the Target store was announced in November 2013. That same month, Macerich put the mall up for auction, and by March 2014, sold it to Kohan Retail Investment Group. Target ended up closing on February 1, 2014. In January 2014, it was announced that JCPenney would be closing its store by May 2014, and would officially close on May 3, 2014. On September 3, 2014, Kohan sold the mall at an undisclosed amount to Via Properties of Istanbul, Turkey, who renovated the mall into ViaPort Florida.

In 2017, ViaPort Florida was purchased by Exclusive Management and Properties, Inc. The new owners changed the name back to Lake Square Mall, and they announced their plans to cut down the vacancy rate and renovate the mall's facade.

On August 31, 2019, it was announced that Sears would be closing this location as part of a plan to close 92 stores nationwide. The store closed in mid-December 2019.
