= Fort Steuben Mall =

Defunct mall in Steubenville, Ohio, U.S.

Coordinates: 40°21′57.8″N 80°40′19.4″W

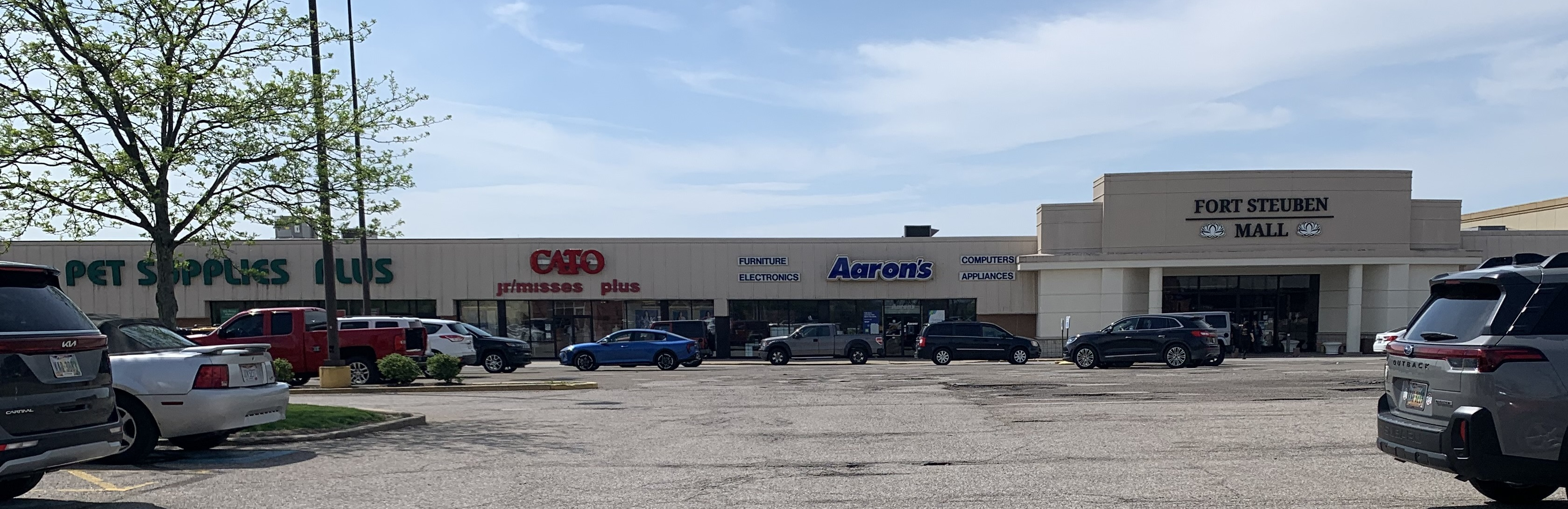
- Northern entrance (April 2026)
- Location: 100 Mall Drive; Steubenville, Ohio
- Opened: 1974; 52 years ago
- Closed: June 30, 2026; 4 months ago
- Developer: Goodman Company
- Owner: Brookwood Capital
- Num. of stores: 38
- Num. of anchor tenants: 4
- Floor area: 823,353 square feet (76,492.0 m^{2})
- Floors: 1 (2 in former Macy's)
- Website: Official website

Fort Steuben Mall was an enclosed shopping mall in Steubenville, Ohio, United States. Opened in 1974, it features JCPenney, Walmart, and 7 Ranges Entertainment as its anchor stores, with one vacant anchor last occupied by Macy's. The mall is managed and owned by Brookwood Capital.

== History ==
The mall opened in 1974 with anchor stores Sears and Kaufmann's. The Kaufmann's store was the first in the chain to be located in a shopping mall. Goodman Company, a real estate company owned by Murray H. Goodman, built the mall. A 1975 expansion added 25 more stores and a third anchor department store, Ashtabula, Ohio-based Carlisle's. An original tenant, Zales Jewelers, won a design competition in that chain upon opening. JCPenney opened an anchor store in 1983 in the former Carlisle's location.

Beginning in 2000, the mall was significantly rebuilt. Sears moved to a new anchor building on the north side, while JCPenney moved into the old Sears location, and the old JCPenney (originally Carlisle's) was demolished for construction of a huge Walmart, which opened in 2002. In 2006, Kaufmann's was renamed Macy's. Sears closed in 2016. Macy's closed in 2017.

The Kohan Retail Investment Group purchased Fort Steuben Mall for $10.75 million in December 2018. They would sell it in 2022 to Brookwood Capital Partners.

In early 2022, Brookwood Capital Partners acquired the shopping mall from the previous owners. Despite attracting new businesses to the mall, Brookwood Capital auctioned it off after only one month.

In 2025, 7 Ranges Entertainment Center opened in the former Sears.

The city of Steubenville condemned the mall on June 30, 2026, declaring that all interior businesses must vacate due to sustained structural damage.
