= The Mall at Sierra Vista =

Shopping mall in Cochise County, Arizona

- Location: Sierra Vista, Arizona, US
- Coordinates: 31°31′45″N 110°15′35″W
- Address: 2200 El Mercado Loop; Sierra Vista, Arizona 85635
- Opened: October 1999; 27 years ago
- Developer: JP Realty
- Manager: Kohan Retail Investment Group; Summit Properties USA
- Owner: Kohan Retail Investment Group; Summit Properties USA
- Num. of stores: 40
- Num. of anchor tenants: 4 (3 open, 1 vacant)
- Floor area: 400,000 sq ft (37,000 m^{2}) (GLA)
- Floors: 1
- Website: http://www.themallatsierravista.com/

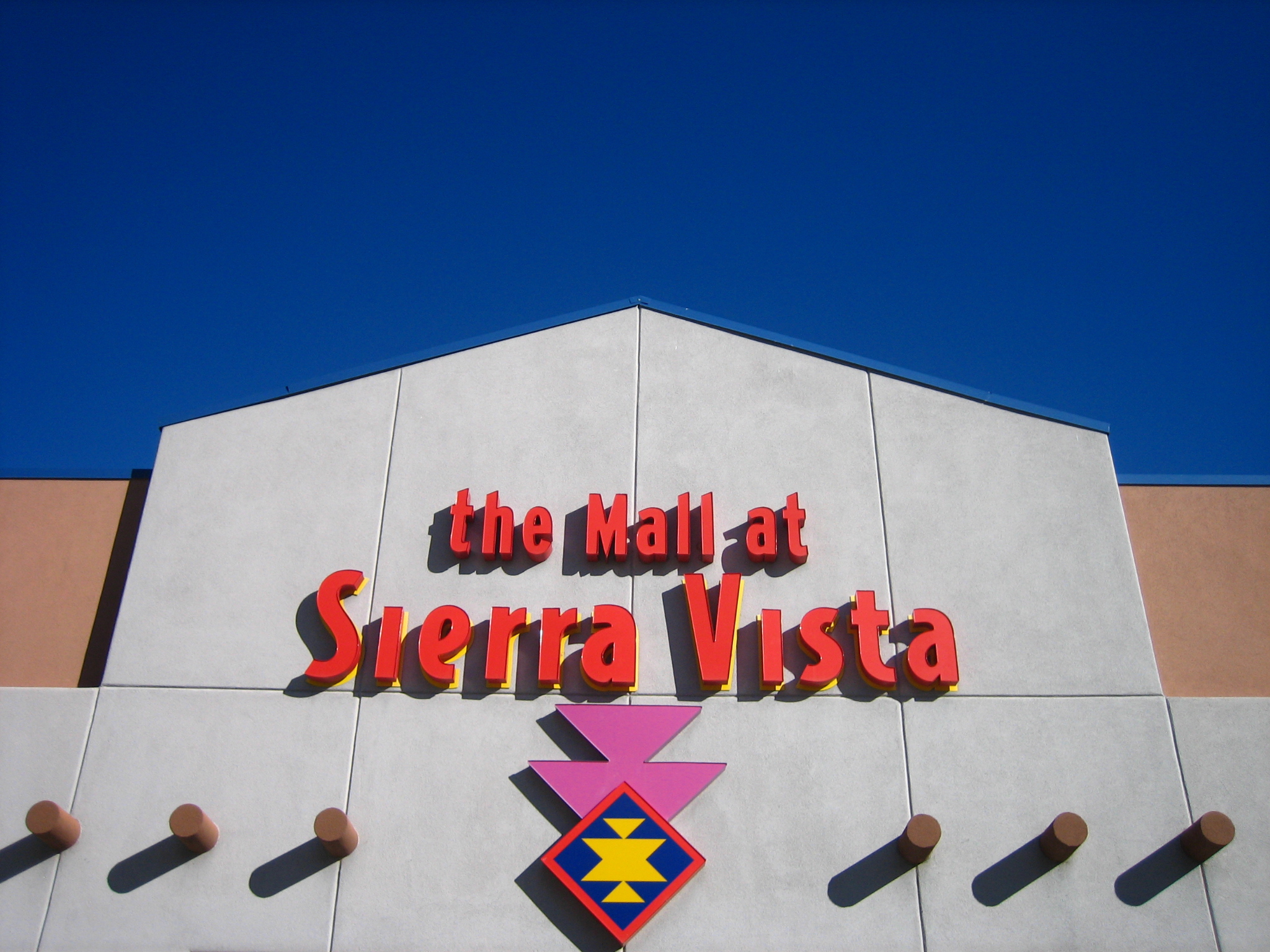
The mall at Sierra Vista

The Mall at Sierra Vista is a regional mall in Sierra Vista, Arizona, United States owned and managed by Kohan Retail Investment Group. It was constructed during the late 1990s. Sierra Vista was one of the fastest-growing communities in Arizona and the major population center for southeastern Arizona. The developers had hoped to market to the growing community, which had no other malls. It was the first major mall to be built in southeastern Arizona, with of retail space.

This regional mall serves a large portion of southeastern Arizona and northern parts of the Mexican state of Sonora. A recent survey indicated that as much as 30% of the mall's shoppers come from Sonora, traveling as far away as Nacozari and Cumpas, 120 miles (190 km) south of the border, just to shop there.

In addition to shopping, the Mall at Sierra Vista hosts the annual Festival of Trees, the Festival of Giving, and an annual Car Show for the Boys and Girls Club. The Mall merits a mention in Ethel Jackson Price's 2003 book, Sierra Vista: a Young City with a Past.

In 2015, Sears Holdings spun off 235 of its properties, including the Sears at The Mall as Sierra Vista, into Seritage Growth Properties. On October 15, 2018, it was announced that Sears would be closing as part of a plan to close 142 stores nationwide. In January 2019, Seritage listed the Sears property for sale due to limited redevelopment opportunities.

In May 2019, the mall was listed for sale; For 2 years, no buyer has been found. Then in July 2021, Kohan Retail Investment Group purchased the mall alongside 6 other malls from Brookfield Asset Management.
