= Towne Square Mall =

- Location: Owensboro, Kentucky, United States
- Coordinates: 37.720572°N 87.1281856°W
- Address: 5000 Frederica Street
- Opened: March 1, 1978
- Closed: September 5, 2023
- Manager: Gulfstream Commercial Services LLC
- Owner: TSM Holdings LLC
- Num. of stores: 52
- Num. of anchor tenants: 3
- Floor area: 437,752 square feet (41,000 m^{2})
- Floors: 1
- Parking: 2,493 spaces
- Public transit: Owensboro Transit System
- Website: archived

Towne Square Mall was a shopping mall located in Owensboro, Kentucky that opened in 1978. The mall featured during its existence several clothing and department stores such as Macy's and Sears, dining areas and a video arcade. The mall operated for 45 years before closing permanently in September 2023. A Planet Fitness location has operated in part of the former mall building continuously since the closure, and Maui's Indoor Theme Park opened on May 8, 2026, taking up a majority of the building's space. The former Sears building is being used by a landscaping company as of May 8, 2026, while the former JCPenney building remains vacant.

== History ==
Towne Square Mall was built by David Hocker and Alan Squitieri for $20 million, with Squitieri later being bought out. It opened on March 1, 1978, and was one of the largest shopping centers in the area. JCPenney moved to the mall from downtown. Heitman Advisory Corporation (Heitman Financial) purchased most of the malls shares in 1987. Hocker and Associates continued as management. TS Partners (Heitman Real Estate Fund III and Southwestern Bell Corporation Master Pension Trust) sold the mall for $29 million to Aronov Realty Management and NationsBank of Texas in 1998. Lakestar Properties purchased the mall for $29 million in April 2007 from Aronov Realty Management. Sears closed in December 2014.

U.S. Bank National Association foreclosed on the mall in July 2015, with the mall owing $27.6 million. Jones Lang LaSalle managed the mall as its receiver. U.S. Bank later purchased the mall at auction for almost $19 million. Kohan Retail Investment Group purchased the mall for $2.9 million in May 2018. Macy's was not part of the sale due to owning its building. Additional property purchases around the mall totaled $1.1 million. Towne Square Mall was again sold in December 2019 to Towne Square Mall Holdings LLC (TSM Holdings LLC) for $5.15 million. Management of the mall was changed to Gulfstream Commercial Services LLC, one of its owners. Macy's closed in spring 2020. JCPenney closed later in 2020.

The former Macy's, not owned by the mall, was sold to Owensboro Indoor Sports LLC for $1.25 million in July 2020. Plans are to convert the building to a sports facility. Due to the COVID-19 pandemic, the plans are delayed as of January 2021.

On August 8, 2023, the remaining open tenants that were located in the interior of the mall were handed eviction notices as the mall announced that it would be closing permanently by September 5, 2023, for future redevelopment plans.

On March 19, 2025, local investment group TS Entertainment, LLC, received approval from the Kentucky Tourism Development Finance Authority to convert a portion of the former Towne Square Mall into a multi-concept, indoor and outdoor entertainment center. On August 25, 2025, it was announced that the indoor entertainment brand Malibu Jack's will partner with TS Entertainment to turn a portion of the former mall into a multi-concept, indoor theme park. On May 8, 2026, the now renamed Maui's Indoor Theme Park opened to the public.
