= Sikes Senter =

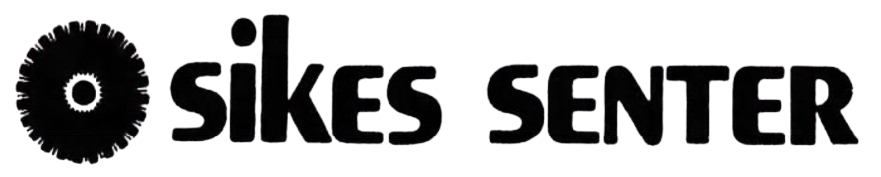
- Location: Wichita Falls, Texas, United States
- Coordinates: 33.869°N 98.53316°W
- Opened: October 30, 1974; 52 years ago
- Developer: Jack Jacobs and Company
- Manager: City of Wichita Falls, Texas
- Owner: City of Wichita Falls, Texas
- Num. of stores: 100+
- Num. of anchor tenants: 4 (all vacant)
- Floor area: 670,000 sq ft (62,000 m^{2})
- Floors: 1

Sikes Senter is a 670,000 sq ft (62,000 m^{2}) shopping mall in Wichita Falls, Texas. It is the only Texas mall within 100 miles (160 km) of Wichita Falls. It was owned and managed by Brookfield Properties Retail Group until 2022, when it was sold to Kohan Retail Investment Group. The mall has no open anchor stores, following the closure of two Dillard's locations in 2022 and JCPenney and At Home in 2024.

== History ==
=== Development and opening ===
Plans were announced to build a 368,475 square feet (34,232.4 m^{2}) air conditioned shopping mall on June 27, 1965. The mall was developed by Louis Sikes and his wife on the former site of the Sikes Farm. Construction on the shopping complex started in July of 1965.

On September 13, 1968, the mall was purchased by Arizona mortgage banker Donald R. Dugan who formed the Sikes Senter Corp. Later that year, Sikes Senter increased its floor area from 368,475 square feet (34,232.4 m^{2}) to 700,000 square feet (65,000 m^{2}).

Sikes Senter was sold on May 1, 1971, to the Chicago-based Hanover Development Corp., later called the Jack Jacobs and Company. Jacobs proposed two additional anchor stores, including JCPenney which signed a lease in 1970. The mall originally planned to open by spring 1973, but its grand opening was later moved to October 30, 1974.

After the site sat vacant for years, the mall opened on October 30, 1974. Mrs. Sikes and Jack Jacobs joined the opening of the shopping mall. Mrs. Sikes cut the ribbon to the 650,000 square feet (60,000 m^{2}) shopping center at 9:30 am. Sikes Senter opened with 38 stores, including Dillard's and JCPenney as anchor tenants. There were four ribbon cutting ceremonies. The JCPenney Automotive Center had their ribbon cutting first at 8:30, and at 9 am Dillard's and JCPenney had their ribbon cutting. A Perkins department store out of Decatur opened for business on July 6, 1975. Lastly the Bealls opened on October 16, 1975.

=== Operations ===
In 1982, Perkins was bought out by Monning's Department Stores out of Fort Worth and rebranded to Monnig's-Perkins. The Monnig's-Perkins store closed on October 24, 1988 and became a second Dillard's on August 11, 1989.

On January 31, 1990, the mall owners at the time, JMB-Federated Realty Associates, announced a proposed wing which would add 10 to 20 new stores and a new 92,700 square feet (8,610 m^{2}) Sears store. Sears opened as an anchor tenant on March 5, 1991, replacing their downtown store which closed on March 2, 1991.

Bealls closed in 2011, becoming The Shoe Department Encore in 2012. Sears closed on December 13, 2015 and became At Home on April 21, 2016. Despite store closures, the mall maintained occupancy higher than the national average.

On May 12, 2022, it was announced that Dillard's would be closing both locations in summer 2022. On June 6, 2024, it was announced the JCPenney would close in fall 2024, leaving At Home as the sole remaining. On July 25, 2024, it was announced that At Home would close later in the year.

=== Redevelopment ===
In 2025, the Wichita Falls Chamber of Commerce confirmed that talks were in place for the city to purchase and demolish the mall, to replace it with an open-air retail area and a new stadium for nearby Midwestern State University. The City of Wichita Falls, Texas purchased the mall on October 15, 2025. Prior to the purchase, citizens where concerned about the city purchasing the mall because the city has bigger issues that are more important than the redevelopment of the Sikes Senter Mall. According to KAUZ-TV, demolition of the mall is expected to begin near the end of 2027, and the project is expected to finish by 2031.
