= Valle Vista Mall =

- Location: Harlingen, Texas, United States
- Coordinates: 26.184547°N 97.718915°W
- Opened: 1983; 43 years ago
- Developer: Melvin Simon & Associates
- Manager: Kohan Retail Investment Group
- Owner: Kohan Retail Investment Group
- Num. of stores: 82
- Num. of anchor tenants: 8 (4 open, 4 vacant)
- Floor area: 651,000 sq ft (60,500 m^{2})
- Floors: 1
- Website: vallevistamall.com

Valle Vista Mall is a regional shopping mall located in Harlingen, Texas, off Interstate 2 (Expressway 83) at the intersection of Dixieland Road and Tyler Avenue. It has 651,000 square feet (60,500 m^{2}) of gross leasable area. It is anchored by Gold's Gym, J. C. Penney, Ollie’s Bargain Outlet, and Urban Air, with four vacant anchors last occupied by Big Lots, Dillard’s Clearance Center, Rack Room Shoes, and Sears.

== History ==
The Valle Vista Mall opened in 1983 and was developed by the Melvin Simon & Associates. The original anchors of the Mall were Joske’s, JCPenney, and Sears.

In 1985, Mervyn's opened.

In May 1985, H. J. Wilson Co. opened.

In 1987, Dillard's acquired the Joske's chain, resulting in the rebranding of the store to Dillard's.

In 1992, H. J. Wilson Co. announced plans to relocate from its original location at the mall to a standalone store.

In March 1993, H. J. Wilson Co. had transitioned to Service Merchandise. The store closed the same month.

In 1998, OfficeMax opened its store.

Also in 1998, Marshalls opened its store and replaced Service Merchandise after being vacant for 5 years.

In 2002, OfficeMax announced it would close its store.

In 2005, Bealls announced it would close its store.

In 2006, Steve & Barry's opened its store and replaced Bealls after being vacant for 1 year.

In 2008, Circuit City opened its store after being vacant for 6 years.

In late 2008, Steve & Barry's announced it would close its store.

On December 21, 2008, it was announced that Mervyn's would be closing as a part of a plan to close 62 stores nationwide.

In January 16, 2009, it was announced that Circuit City would be closing as a part of a plan to close all its stores.

In late 2009, Marshalls announced to relocate from its original location at the mall to a shopping center.

In 2010, Big Lots opened its store and replaced Marshalls after being vacant for 1 year.

In May 2011, Gold's Gym replaced Circuit City after being vacant for 2 years.

In 2014, Simon Property Group spun off the Valle Vista Mall to Washington Prime Group (now known as WPG).

In 2017, Forever 21 closed its location.

In August 2018, Kohan Retail Investment Group had acquired the Valle Vista Mall from Washington Prime Group.

On October 15, 2018, it was announced that Sears would be closing as part of a plan to close 142 stores nationwide.

In 2019, both Urban Air Trampoline Park and an Ollie’s Bargain Outlet replaced the former Forever 21.

In June 2021, Dillard’s (which at the time had downgraded to an Dillard’s Clearance Center) had announced it would close its Valle Vista Mall location.

In February 2023, it was reported that Kohan had put the Valle Vista Mall up for sale.

On February 29, 2024, the mall's owners paid $313,409 in property taxes delinquent since Feb. 1, paying $20,503 in late fees, the Cameron County Tax Assessor-Collectors office said. Last year, Kohan put the mall up for sale, listing it for $12 million. At the same time the report states that the electricity company in Harlingen cut its power after Valle Vista Mall did not pay the bill again.

On January 24, 2025, it was announced that Big Lots would be closing as part of a plan to close 900+ stores nationwide.

In 2026, Rack Room Shoes closed its location.
