= The Esplanade (Kenner, Louisiana) =

Coordinates: 30°00′59″N 90°14′57″W

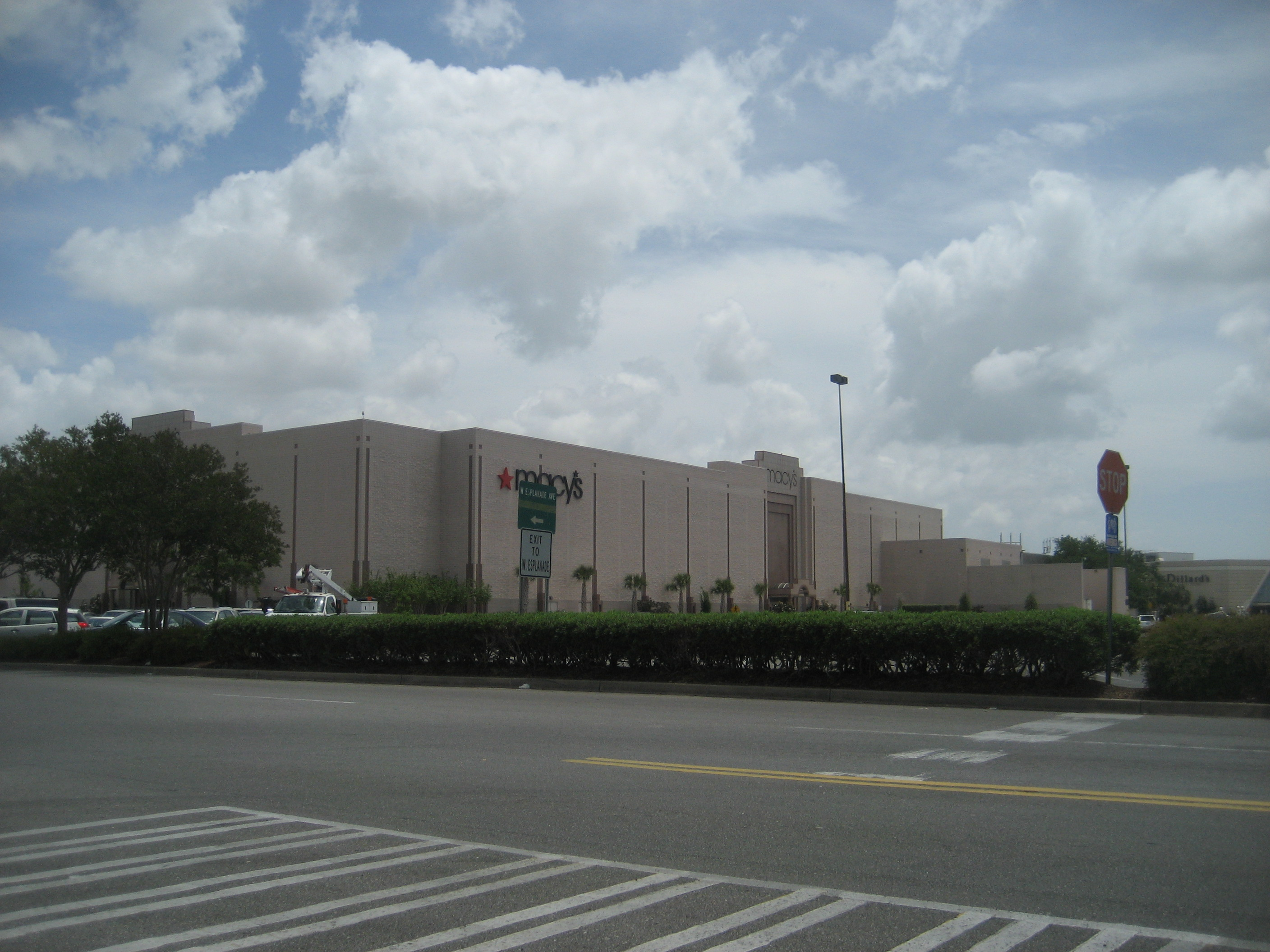
- Location: Kenner, Louisiana, United States
- Opened: October 9, 1985
- Closed: August 27, 2021
- Developer: Cadillac Fairview
- Owner: Kohan Retail Investment Group
- Num. of stores: 28
- Num. of anchor tenants: 4 (2 open, 2 vacant)
- Floor area: 900,000 sq.ft.
- Floors: 2 (1 in Target and Dillard's Clearance center)

The Esplanade, also known as Esplanade Mall, was a suburban shopping mall located in the New Orleans suburb of Kenner, Louisiana, United States. Its anchors are Dillard's Clearance Center, 3.6.5+ by image, Target, and Regal Cinemas' Regal Grand Esplanade & GPX. Its former anchors are D. H. Holmes, Macy's (the first Macy's in Louisiana), and Mervyn's. It opened in September 1985 and was owned by the Simon Property Group, who acquired it when they acquired the Mills Corporation in 2007. Simon was the owner of The Mall From mid-2007 until mid-September 2016, when Pacific Retail Capital Partners took over as a new owner. Pacific Retail Capital Partners was the owner of The Mall from September 2016 until June 2018 when Kohan Retail Investment Group bought it. Kohan Retail Investment Group owned the mall from June 2018 until August 2021, when it was used by the Kenner City Government as a temporary City Hall in the wake of Hurricane Ida.

== History ==
=== 20th century ===
The mall was built and opened on October 9, 1985. The original owners were Cadillac Fairview. The mall's original anchors were D. H. Holmes, Leon Godchaux, and Mervyn's. A Macy's was added in 1986. Dillard's acquired the former D. H. Holmes Anchor in 1989. Dillard's Men took over for Leon Godchaux in 1992.

=== 21st century ===
The Mills Corporation acquired the mall in 2003, and planned to add new retail including two new anchors, Target and Bass Pro Shops, and a new movie theater, but the plan fell through as a result of financial difficulties.

The mall closed in August 2005 after sustaining damage from Hurricane Katrina, reopening by October 2005.

In 2006, Macy's closed its store in the Esplanade, but re-opened in October 2008. Mervyn's closed in 2006 and the former Mervyn's anchor sat vacant until 2010. In July 2010, it was announced that the former Mervyn's anchor would be demolished. Since then, a 138,000 sq ft (12,800 m^{2}) Target has been built in its place. The new store officially opened July 24, 2011.

In late 2011, Dillard's Men's Store closed, and in February 2012, the other Dillard's location was converted into a clearance center. Closing off the second floor of the store and blocking the second floor mall entrance to Dillard's.

In Mar 2016 3.6.5 By Image Opened In The Former Dillard's Men.

Macy's closed again in 2017 as part of a nationwide downsizing.

On October 5, 2020, Cineworld announced it would close all Regal, Cineworld, Picturehouse Cinemas, and Grand Cinemas locations in the US, UK, Ireland temporarily. The mall as of 2021 owes various back taxes totaling $320,000. While investigating the back taxes, it was found by Jefferson Parish, Louisiana that taxes had been missed on the empty Macy's in 1992, totaling an additional $480,000 owed. Parts of the mall went to tax sale but went unsold, and were taken over by Jefferson Parish. The Esplanade closed again due to Hurricane Ida in late 2021 and has permanently closed.

== In popular culture ==
- The interior of the mall was heavily featured in Season 1, Episode 11 of the Fox horror comedy Scream Queens.
