= Anderson Mall =

Coordinates: 34.54°N 82.67°W

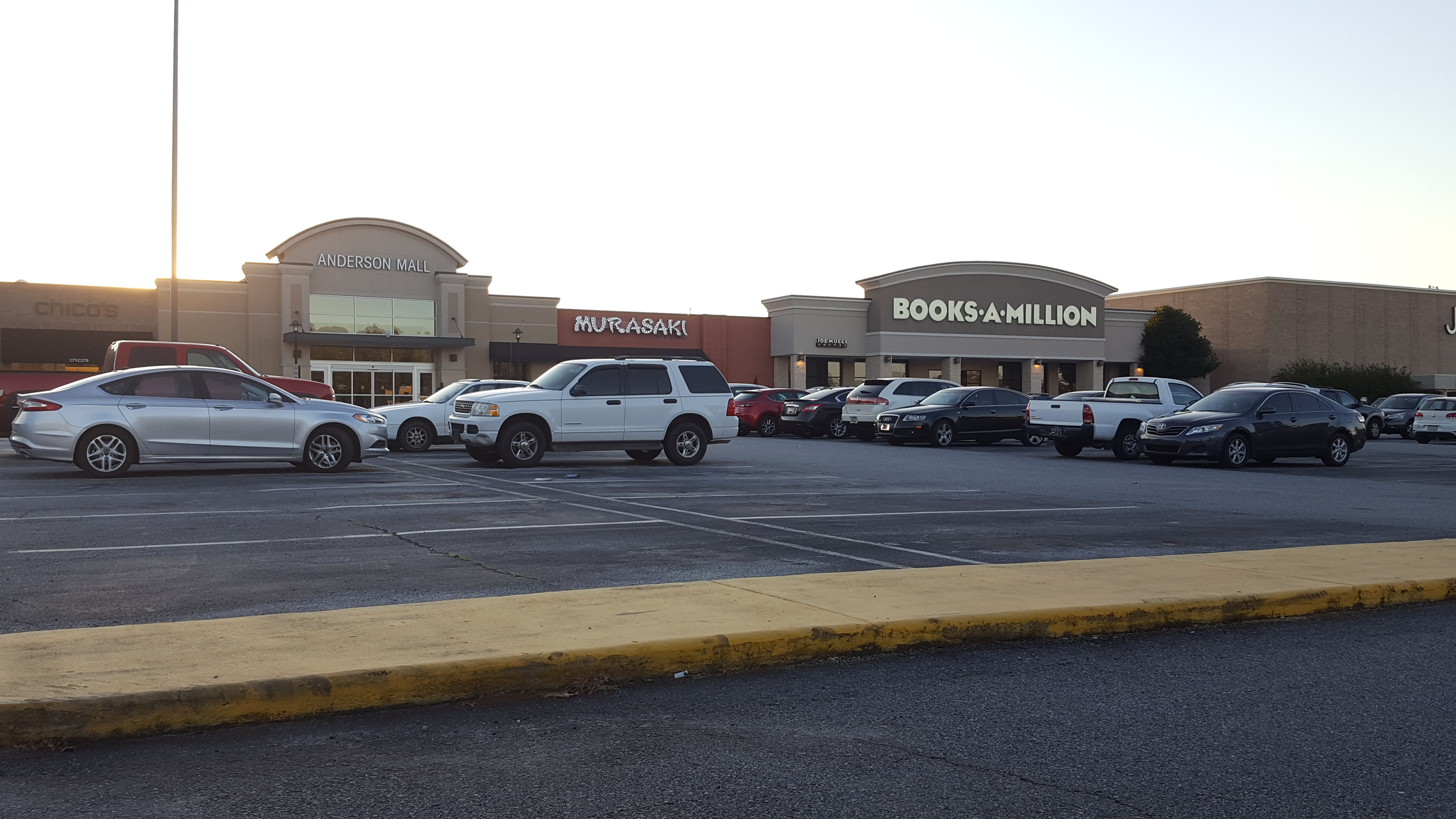
- Exterior view of Anderson Mall, October 2016
- Location: Anderson, South Carolina, United States
- Opened: February 10, 1972
- Developer: Melvin Simon & Associates
- Owner: Kohan Retail Investment Group; Summit Properties USA
- Num. of stores: 50+
- Num. of anchor tenants: 4
- Floor area: 671,000 sq ft (62,300 m^{2})
- Floors: 1
- Website: shopandersonmall.com

Anderson Mall is a regional shopping mall located in Anderson County, South Carolina. The mall, which is anchored by Belk, JCPenney, Dillard's, and Rural King. The mall has 671,000 sq ft (62,300 m^{2}) of gross leasable area. Built by Melvin Simon & Associates (now Simon Property Group), it is owned by Kohan Retail Investment Group and Summit Properties USA.

== History ==
In September, 1970, Meyers Arnold announced it would build a $2 million dollar store at the future Anderson Mall. Opening for the 60,000 square foot anchor store was scheduled for August 1971. The mall was being developed by Melvin Simon & Associates, who had already built malls in several cities across the United States at the time.

Anderson Mall would open its doors officially on February 10, 1972. Anchors for the property were Meyers Arnold, JCPenney and Eckerd Drug. 14 stores were present at opening day, including Murphy's Department Store, three shoe stores, two jewelry stores, a wig shop, and more.

In 1984 both Belk (then known as Gallant Belk) and Sears executives closed their downtown Anderson stores and moved to the newly expanded and renovated mall. This expansion was first announced in 1982. Meyers Arnold was later purchased by Uptons, and after that chain closed, that spot became a Belk Men's & Home store.

In 2007, the Belk Men's & Home store was closed, with the men's store moving into the existing women's and kids store. The Home Store relocated to an adjacent mall space next to the main Belk. These moves were to make way for a new store, Dillard's, which opened in late 2008. The entire mall and numerous other stores were also remodeled around that time.

On May 31, 2018, it was announced that Sears would be closing as part of a plan to close 72 stores nationwide. The store was closed in September 2018.

On June 4, 2020, it was announced that the JCPenney would be closing as part of a plan to close 154 stores nationwide. However, it was removed from the closing list on June 23, 2020.

In December, 2025, it was announced that Rural King would open their second location in South Carolina at the Anderson Mall inside the former Sears. The first Rural King location in South Carolina opened in the WestGate Mall. The store was completed and held its grand opening on June 19, 2026. Rural King occupies the entire former Sears anchor building. With the opening of Rural King, Anderson Mall has all of its anchor spaces occupied.
