= River Hills Mall =

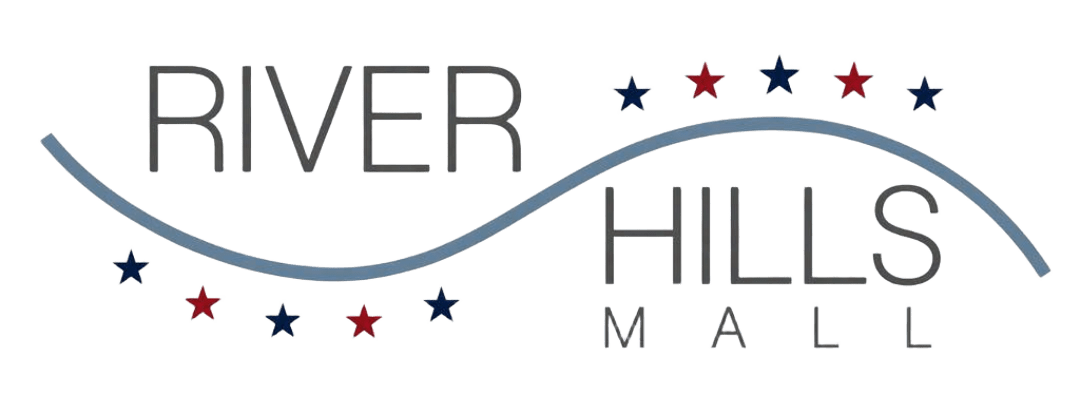
- Location: Mankato, Minnesota, United States
- Coordinates: 44.1729°N 93.9536°W
- Address: 1850 Adams Street
- Opened: 1991; 35 years ago
- Developer: General Growth Properties
- Owner: Summit Properties USA
- Num. of stores: 85+ (at peak)
- Num. of anchor tenants: 7 (5 open, 2 vacant)
- Floor area: 716,224 sq ft (66,539 m^{2})
- Floors: 1
- Parking: 3,443 free spaces (7 parking lots)
- Public transit: MTS
- Website: https://www.riverhillsmall.com

River Hills Mall is an enclosed shopping mall in Mankato, Minnesota featuring retailers such as Target, Scheel's, Barnes & Noble, and JCPenney. The mall has a carousel in the food court, and is surrounded by businesses such as Olive Garden, Chick-Fil-A, PetSmart, and several hotels.

== History ==
=== 1987-1991: Planning and Construction ===
The River Hills Mall was constructed on former farmland by General Growth Properties, with surveying and planning beginning in 1987. The land, owned by Paul Radichel and his family, had been rezoned in 1989 by the Mankato city council after arguments with existing business owners, and the competing Madison East mall.

=== 1991-2008: Grand Opening and Early Years ===
The mall opened under the management of Paul Wilke in 1991 with less than 26 stores, and just 3 anchor stores; Herberger's, Target and JCPenney. Sears became the fourth anchor in 1993, and Scheels constructed a new space in 2006, becoming the fifth anchor, after relocating in 1994 from its previous location at Madison East Center. A health clinic opened at the mall in 2007, and Barnes & Noble moved from an existing nearby location in 2008, taking over the original Scheels space.

=== 2008-Present ===
After reports of financial struggle, Sears closed in early 2017, and the space has since sat vacant. With the announcement of Herberger's parent company, The Bon Ton being bought out by liquidators, Herberger's closed in mid 2018, and the space has since sat vacant. River Hills Mall was sold to the Kohan Retail Investment Group in 2021 for $29.4 million.

PetSmart opened outside the mall on January 5, 2018.

A Chick-Fil-A was constructed on the former Party City lot outside the mall in 2026. An A&W location in the mall with front signage closed April 2026
