= Washington Park Mall =

- Location: Bartlesville, Oklahoma, USA
- Coordinates: 36°42′56″N 95°55′54″W
- Opened: 1984
- Developer: Homart Development Company
- Manager: Michelle Harris
- Owner: Summit Properties USA
- Num. of stores: 30
- Num. of anchor tenants: 3 (2 open, 1vacant)
- Floor area: 432,030 square feet
- Floors: 1
- Website: washingtonparkmall.com

Washington Park Mall is a 432,303 square feet (40,162.3 m^{2}) enclosed shopping mall in Bartlesville, Oklahoma

== History ==
Washington Park Mall is a 432,303 square feet (40,162.3 m^{2}) enclosed shopping mall in Bartlesville, Oklahoma that opened in 1984, developed by the Homart Development Company, the real-estate arm of Sears.

When General Growth Properties, formally Homart, filed for bankruptcy in 2009, the property was one of 30 spun off to investment trust Rouse Properties in 2011. In 2017, Rouse put the property up for sale with an asking price of $13.4 Million. In 2021, the mall was sold to Kohan Retail Investment Group, a property group with a mixed record of improving failing malls. Most of the mall is currently owned and managed by Summit Properties USA, with the exception of the Dillard's anchor store.

By the end of 2017, the mall was half vacant with stores like Buckle, Cavender's, Gap Outlet, GNC, and Maurice's closing or relocating to strip malls within Bartlesville. In March 2023, the mall banned minors under the age of 16 unless accompanied by a parent/guardian, blaming theft and vandalism. In 2025, the mall was being improved, including having its fountain repaired, with the goal to bring in local businesses.

== Anchors ==
- Dillard's Clearance Center 74,086 ft³
- Dunham's Sports

== Former Anchors ==
- JCPenney (closed May 12, 2018)
- Sears (closed January 2019)
- Goody's (closed 2020)
