= Virginia Center Commons =

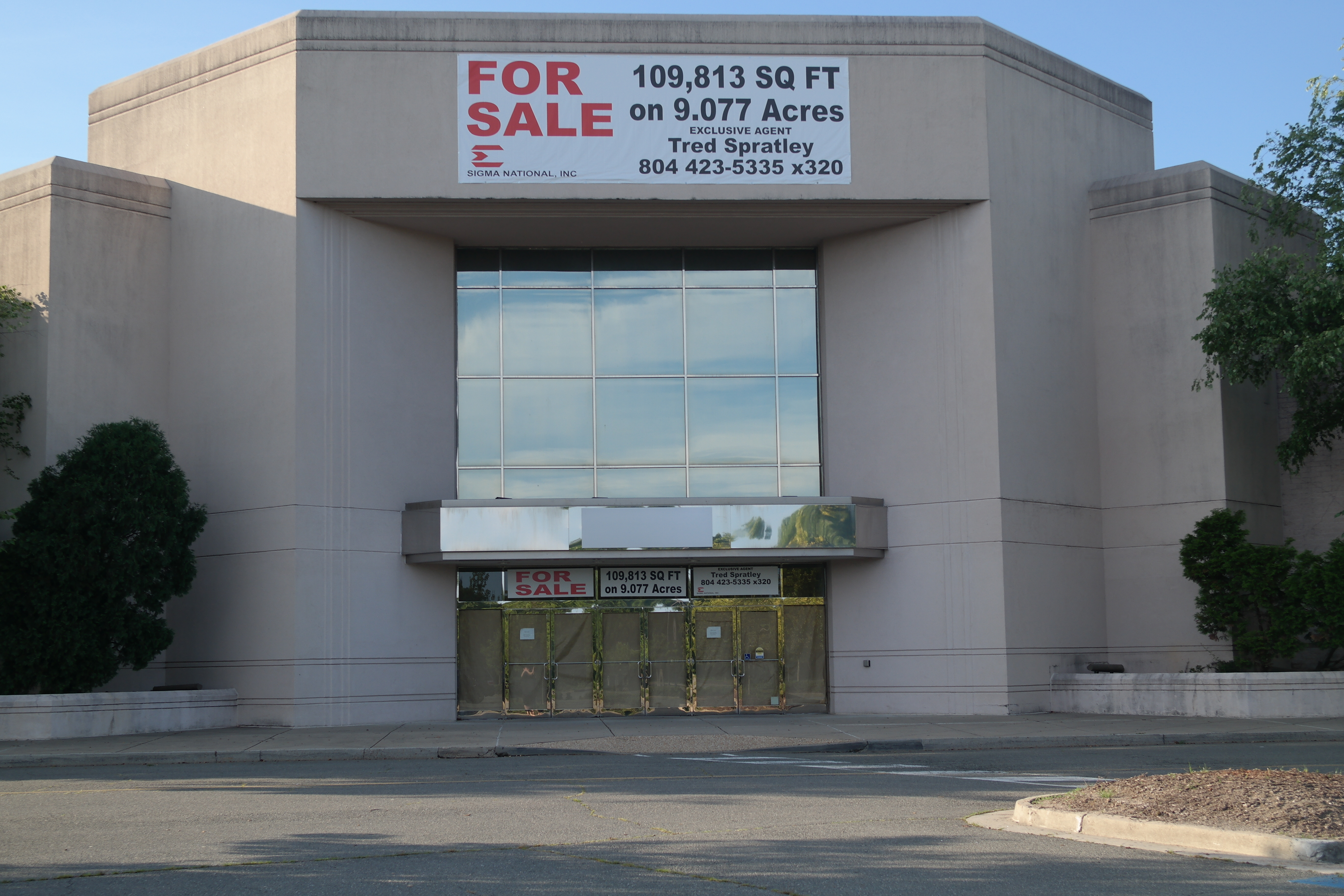
- Former Macy's store at Virginia Center Commons; July 2016
- Location: Glen Allen, Virginia, United States
- Coordinates: 37°40′33.5″N 77°27′15.3″W
- Opened: 1991
- Closed: October 31, 2022
- Developer: Edward J. DeBartolo Corp. and Faison Enterprises
- Owner: VCC Partners LLC; Shamin VCC LLC
- Num. of stores: 60
- Num. of anchor tenants: 5 (all vacant)
- Floor area: 775,000 sq ft (72,000 m^{2})
- Floors: 1
- Website: shopvirginiacentercommons.com

Virginia Center Commons (VCC) was an enclosed shopping mall located in Glen Allen, Virginia, near the state capital of Richmond. Built in 1991, Simon Property Group owned the mall until 2014 when it was split off to Washington Prime Group. In January 2017, the mall was sold again to Kohan Retail Investment Group.

== History ==
When VCC first opened, it siphoned off a significant amount of business from three other area malls: Azalea Mall, Fairfield Commons (formerly Eastgate Mall) and Willow Lawn. In the case of Azalea Mall, which opened in the 1960s as the first enclosed mall in Richmond, it took enough business away to relegate that mall to "dead mall" status and Azalea Mall was subsequently closed and demolished in the 1990s. It took the Sears anchor away from Fairfield Commons and sent it almost to the same point. That mall closed in 2015 for redevelopment into a smaller open-air mall. It also took the JCPenney anchor away from Willow Lawn and led Willow Lawn to eventually reposition itself as more of a community shopping center than a regional shopping destination.

In January 2021, demolition began on the former Macy's and Sears anchors to make room for an indoor sportsplex.

The JCPenney building was also acquired in January 2021, and it, alongside the rest of the mall (excluding the American Family Fitness anchor), is planned to be razed and replaced with a mixed-use development anchored by the mentioned sportsplex and a hotel owned by Shamin Hotels. The mall closed permanently on October 31, 2022, after remaining tenants had their leases terminated by the mall's licensor in preparation for the redevelopment.

== Stores ==
Among the mall's original anchor stores were Proffitt's and Leggett, a division of Belk. These stores both became Dillard's in 1997 and 1998, respectively. In 2011, Dillard's closed the former Proffitt's store, which became a Burlington Coat Factory, and downgraded the former Leggett to an outlet store before closing it later in 2011. The former Leggett is now occupied by American Family Fitness.

As part of a nationwide closing of 36 stores, Macy's closed its former Hecht's store at Virginia Center Commons in spring 2016. On November 8, 2018, it was announced that Sears would be closing their location at Virginia Center Commons in early 2019 as part of a plan to close 40 underperforming stores. Virginia Center Commons was sold for $8.3 million in early 2020 to VCC Partners LLC and Shamin VCC LLC.
