= Animas Valley Mall =

Coordinates: 36.762°N 108.150°W

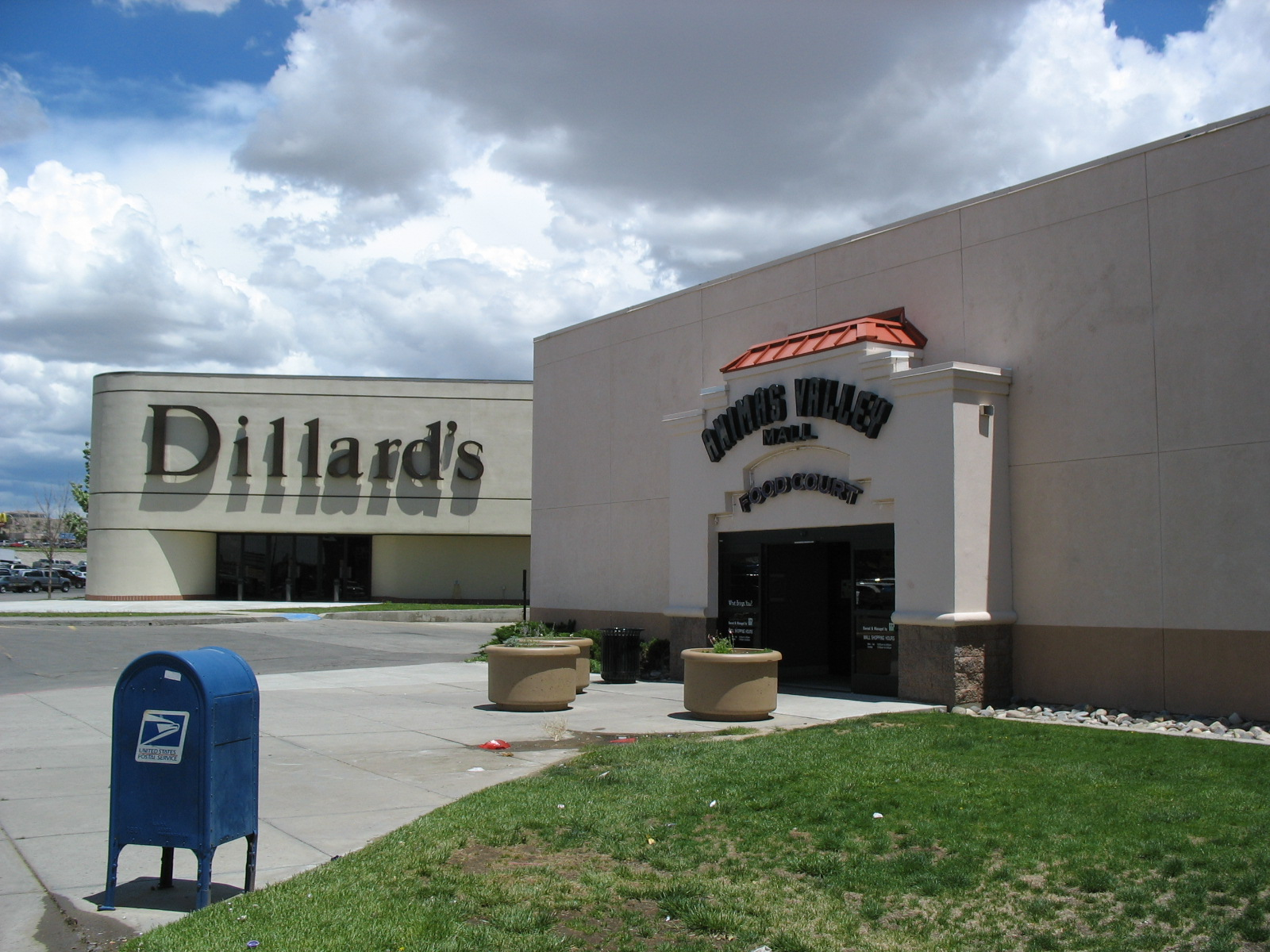
- Location: Farmington, New Mexico, United States
- Opened: 1982; 44 years ago
- Developer: Gottlieb Corp.
- Manager: Summit Properties USA
- Owner: Summit Properties USA
- Architect: Alan B. Fiengold
- Num. of stores: 62
- Num. of anchor tenants: 5 (4 open, 1 vacant)
- Floor area: 490,000 square feet (45,522.5 m^{2})
- Floors: 1
- Website: animasvalleymall.com

Animas Valley Mall is an enclosed regional center shopping mall in Farmington, New Mexico. Its anchors are Dillard's, JCPenney, Ross, and Animas Cinema 10.

The mall is the largest shopping center in the Four Corners region.

== History ==
The mall was first announced in 1980, planned to have five anchors including Sears, Dillard's, Bealls, and H. J. Wilson Co. Built by Gottlieb Corp and designed by Alan B Feingold Architects, the mall opened as scheduled in 1982.

In May 2016, Hibbett Sports opened a location in the mall, as did Ulta Beauty that October.

The mall was owned by General Growth Properties until Rouse Properties was spun off from the company in 2012. Rouse was acquired by Brookfield Properties in 2016.

On November 7, 2019, it was announced that Sears would be closing this location a part of a plan to close 96 stores nationwide. The store closed on February 3, 2020. In 2019, Hobby Lobby filed plans with the city of Farmington to renovate the space formerly occupied by Sears, though no such renovations have taken place as of May 2023.

As of Summer 2023, Brookfield Properties no longer owns the mall and transferred ownership to Kohan Retail Investment Group.
