= Colonial Park Mall =

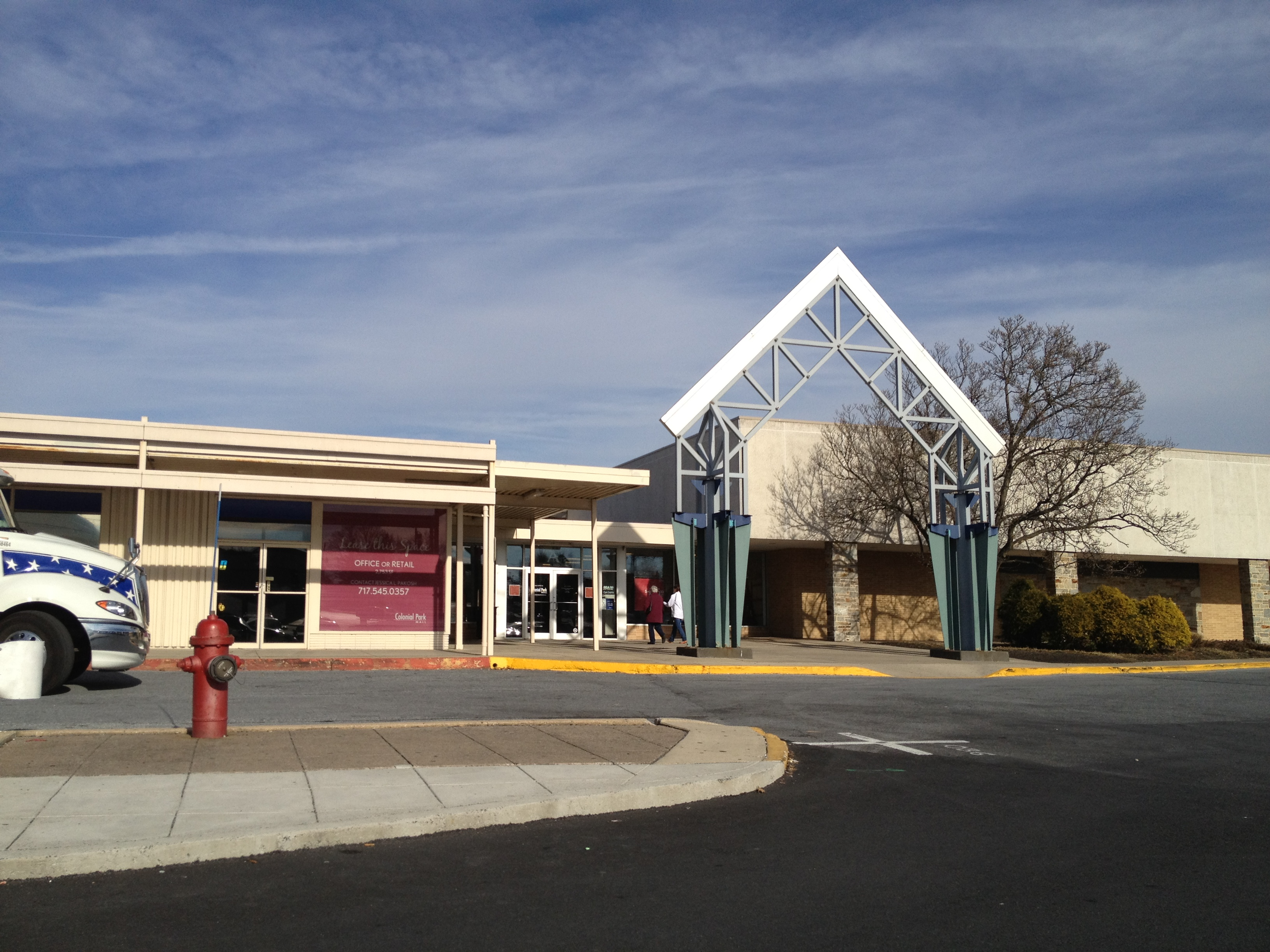
- Entrance to Colonial Park Mall, December 2012
- Location: Lower Paxton Township, Pennsylvania
- Coordinates: 40.302°N 76.819°W
- Address: U.S. Route 22 & Colonial Road
- Opened: November 9, 1960
- Developer: Food Fair
- Owner: Zi Quan Zhang
- Num. of stores: 21
- Num. of anchor tenants: 3 (2 closed)
- Floor area: 743,497 sq ft (69,073.1 m^{2})
- Floors: 1 (2 in Boscov's and the former Bon-Ton plus a basement in Sears)
- Public transit: CAT bus: 12
- Website: colonialparkmall.com

Colonial Park Mall is a shopping mall in Lower Paxton Township, Pennsylvania, about 3 miles (4.8 km) northeast of Harrisburg. Located at the northeast corner of U.S. Route 22 and Colonial Road in the Colonial Park CDP just east of Interstate 83 and south of Interstate 81, it serves the eastern and northern suburbs of the Harrisburg metropolitan area. The mall's anchor store is Boscov's. There are 2 vacant anchor stores that were once The Bon-Ton and Sears.

== History ==
The mall originally opened in 1960 as an open-air center called Colonial Park Plaza and featured Sears and Food Fair as anchor stores. It was enclosed and renamed Colonial Park Mall in 1970. Pomeroy's opened in the Mall on July 25, 1974.In 1987, Boscov's was added. That same year, The Bon-Ton company acquired the Pomeroy's chain from Allied Department Stores and rebranded the stores as The Bon-Ton in 1990.

In 1997, Glimcher Realty Trust acquired the Colonial Park Mall from Catalina Partners LP. Washington Prime Group assumed ownership of the mall in 2014 when it acquired Glimcher Realty Trust. In 2017, Kohan Retail Investment Group bought the Colonial Park Mall from Washington Prime Group for $15 million.

The Bon-Ton store closed in 2018.

In September 2021, it was announced that the Sears anchor store, which was among the chain's last less than forty stores, would close. It closed on November 14, 2021.

The Colonial Park Mall was planned to head to a sheriff's sale on July 20, 2023, due to Kohan Retail Investment Group owing over $250,000 in unpaid sewer and storm water bills to Lower Paxton Township. On April 28, 2023, it was announced that Stonewall Capital LLC, which is based in Maryland, was under contract to purchase the mall from Kohan Retail Investment Group. Stonewall Capital LLC had plans to redevelop the Colonial Park Mall by adding residential areas and redesigning the mall to feature new retail spaces. As part of the planned redevelopment, the Boscov's anchor would remain as they own their space. In July 2023, the planned sale fell through due to the unpaid sewer and storm water bills. A sheriff's sale on the delinquent utility charges was averted when Kohan paid 25 minutes before the deadline. In July 2024, the Colonial Park Mall will be put up for auction. The auction date was delayed. In September, Colonial Park Mall was sold for $8.8 million. In October 2024, it was later revealed that Zi Qian Zhang purchased the mall.

== Anchors ==
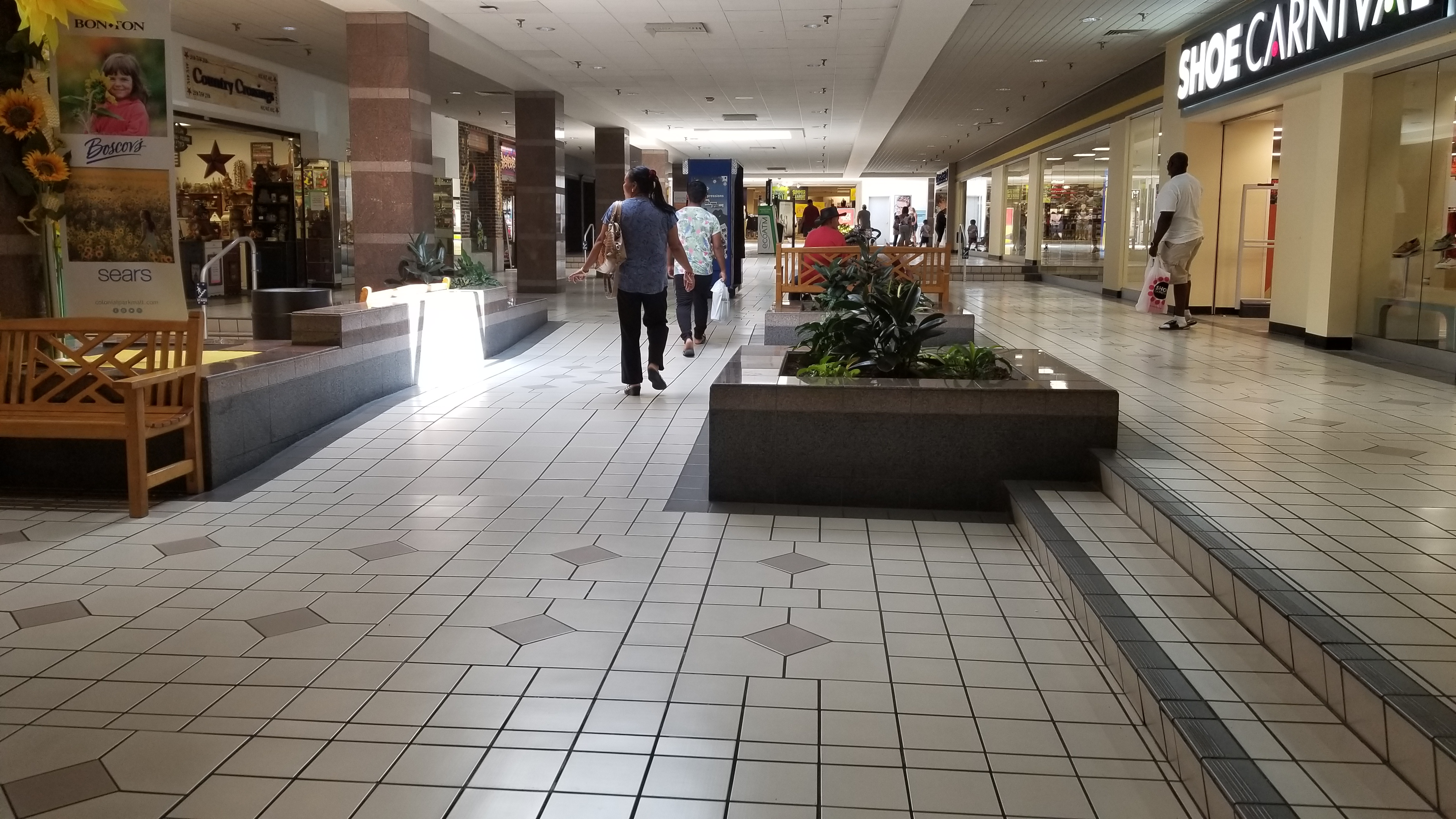
Colonial Park Mall in August 2018

=== Current ===
- Boscov's - since 1987

=== Former ===
- The Bon-Ton - 1990-2018
- Sears - 1960-November 2021
- Pomeroy's - 1973-1990
- Food Fair
