= Eastridge Mall (Wyoming) =

Coordinates: 42.8463°N 106.265795°W

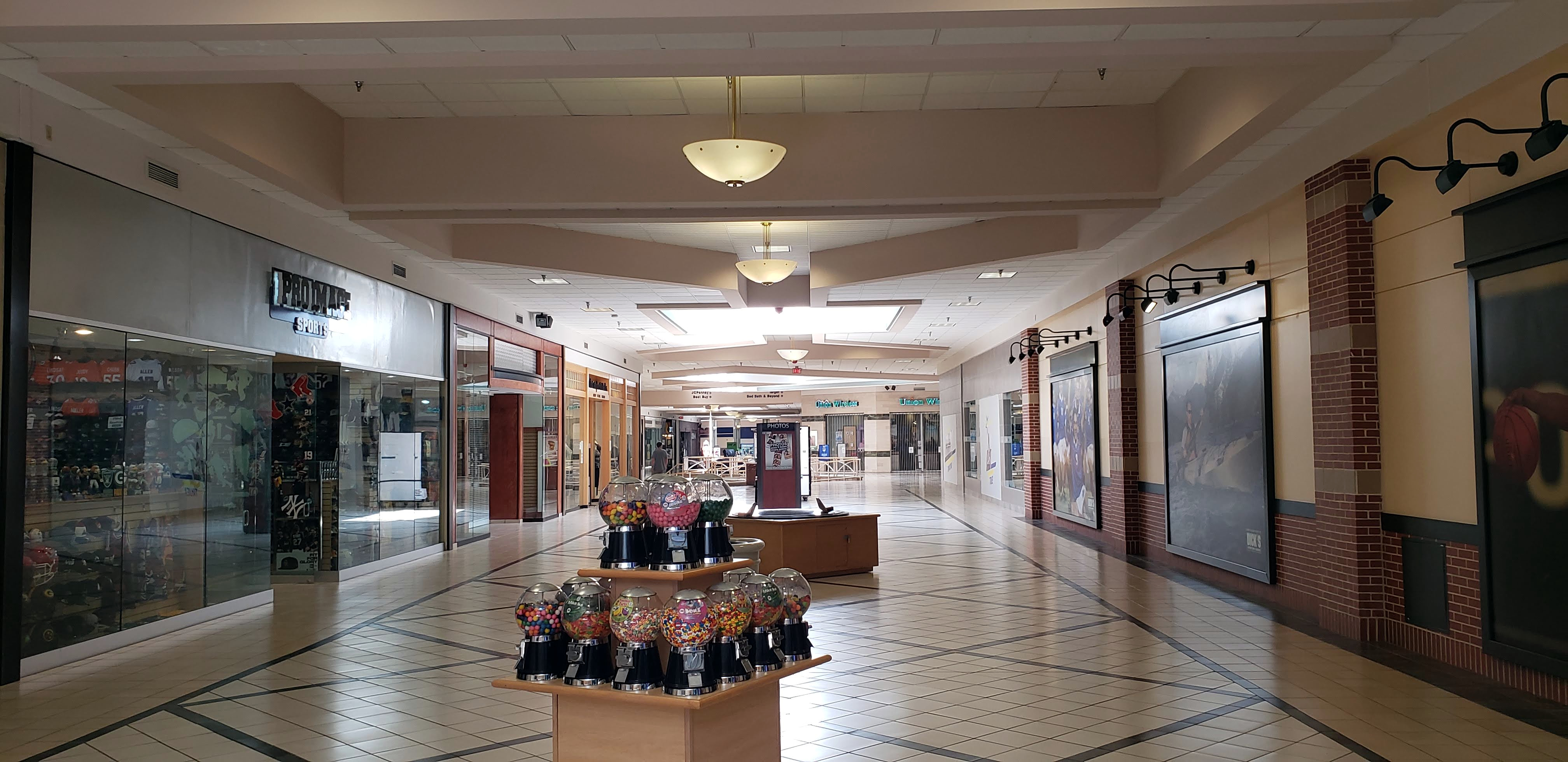
- A portion of the Eastridge Mall in Casper, Wyoming.
- Location: Casper, Wyoming
- Opened: October 13, 1982; 44 years ago
- Developer: Price Development Corporation
- Manager: Kohan Retail Investment Group; Summit Properties USA
- Owner: Kohan Retail Investment Group; Summit Properties USA
- Num. of stores: 58
- Num. of anchor tenants: 8 (7 open, 1 vacant)
- Floor area: 569,936 sq ft (52,948.8 m^{2})
- Floors: 1
- Website: https://www.shopeastridge.com/

Eastridge Mall is a single level enclosed shopping mall in Casper, Wyoming. It is at the city's busiest intersection, east Second Street and southeast Wyoming Boulevard. It is one of three shopping malls in Wyoming.

The mall is anchored by Target, JCPenney, Best Buy, Ross Dress For Less, and Dick's Sporting Goods.

== History ==
The mall opened on October 13, 1982 with JCPenney, Sears, and Target, followed by The Bon Marché in early 1983. The Bon Marché was converted to Macy's in 2005.

In 2014, Hibachi Sushi and Supreme Buffet opened at the mall.

In 2017, Gymboree closed at the mall.

On October 15, 2018, it was announced that Sears would be closing as part of a plan to close 142 stores nationwide. The store closed in late December 2018. This was the last full-line Sears left in Wyoming.

On December 31, 2018, it was announced that Macy's would also be closing in early 2019. This was the only Macy's in Wyoming, which left the state without a Macy's. The space has been used by Spirit Halloween since 2019 and was Spirit again in 2021. It was also used as a Vaccine Center in mid-2021.

In mid-2020, the mall saw a blow to the food court with Serendipity Cafe making the hard decision to close all five of its restaurants (Serendipity Cafe, Cluck It, Brisket Burger, Pizzanity, and Abuelita's).

In July 2021, Kohan Retail Investment Group acquired the mall alongside 6 other malls from Brookfield Asset Management

On February 9, 2023, it was announced that Bed Bath & Beyond would be closing as part of a plan to close 149 stores. Later in 2024, it was announced that Ashley HomeStore would open in August 2024 to replace the old Bed Bath & Beyond space.
