= Brass Mill Center =

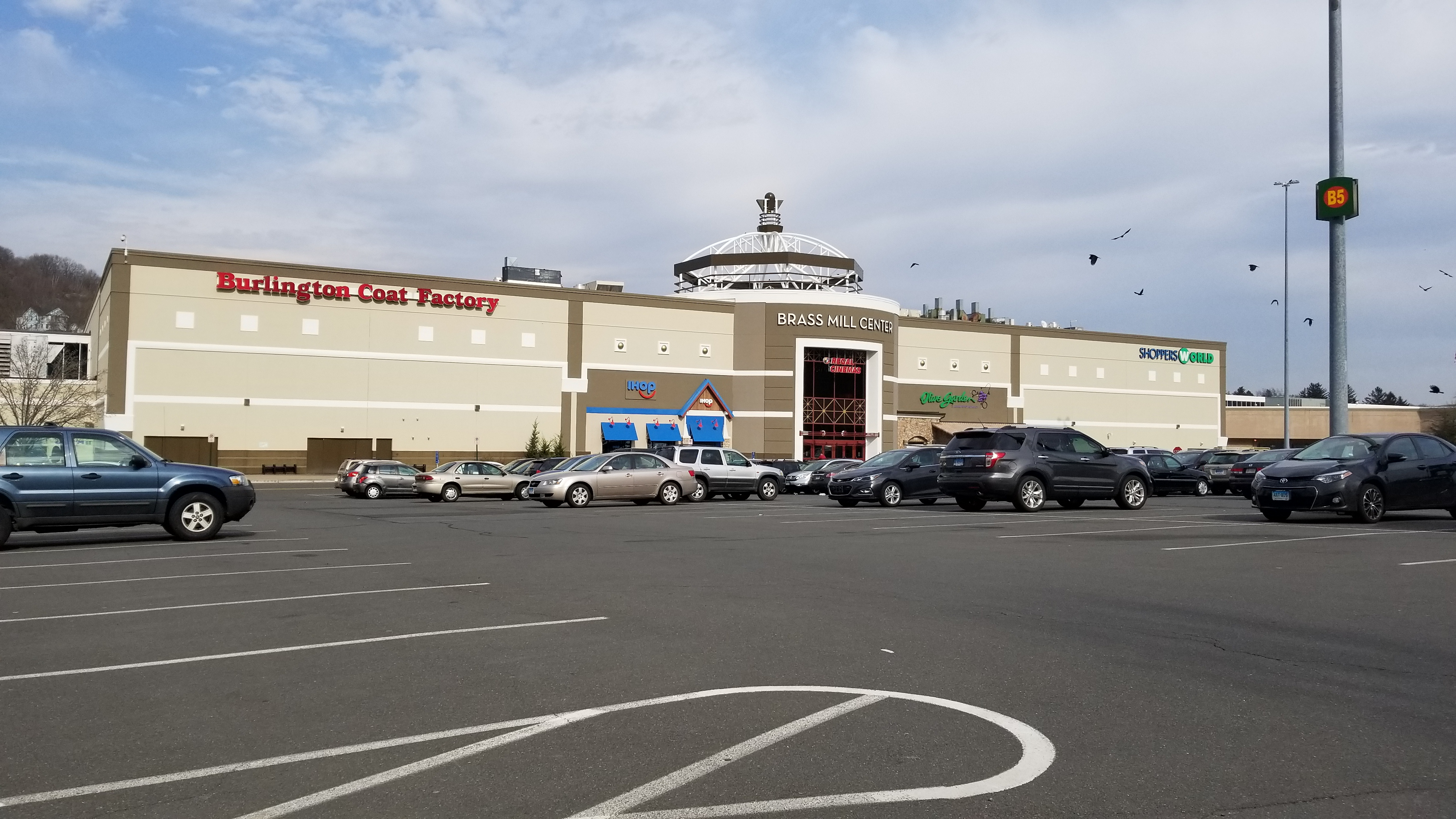
- Exterior view of Brass Mill Center, April 2018
- Location: Waterbury, Connecticut, United States
- Coordinates: 41.549251°N 73.024986°W
- Address: 495 Union Street, Suite 139, Waterbury, CT 06706 United States
- Opened: September 17, 1997
- Developer: General Growth Properties
- Manager: Tony Guerriero
- Owner: Kohan Retail Investment Group; Summit Properties USA
- Num. of stores: 90+
- Num. of anchor tenants: 3
- Floor area: 1,179,569 sq ft (109,586 m^{2})
- Floors: 2
- Parking: 5800 spaces
- Public transit: 422, 431
- Website: brassmillcenter.com

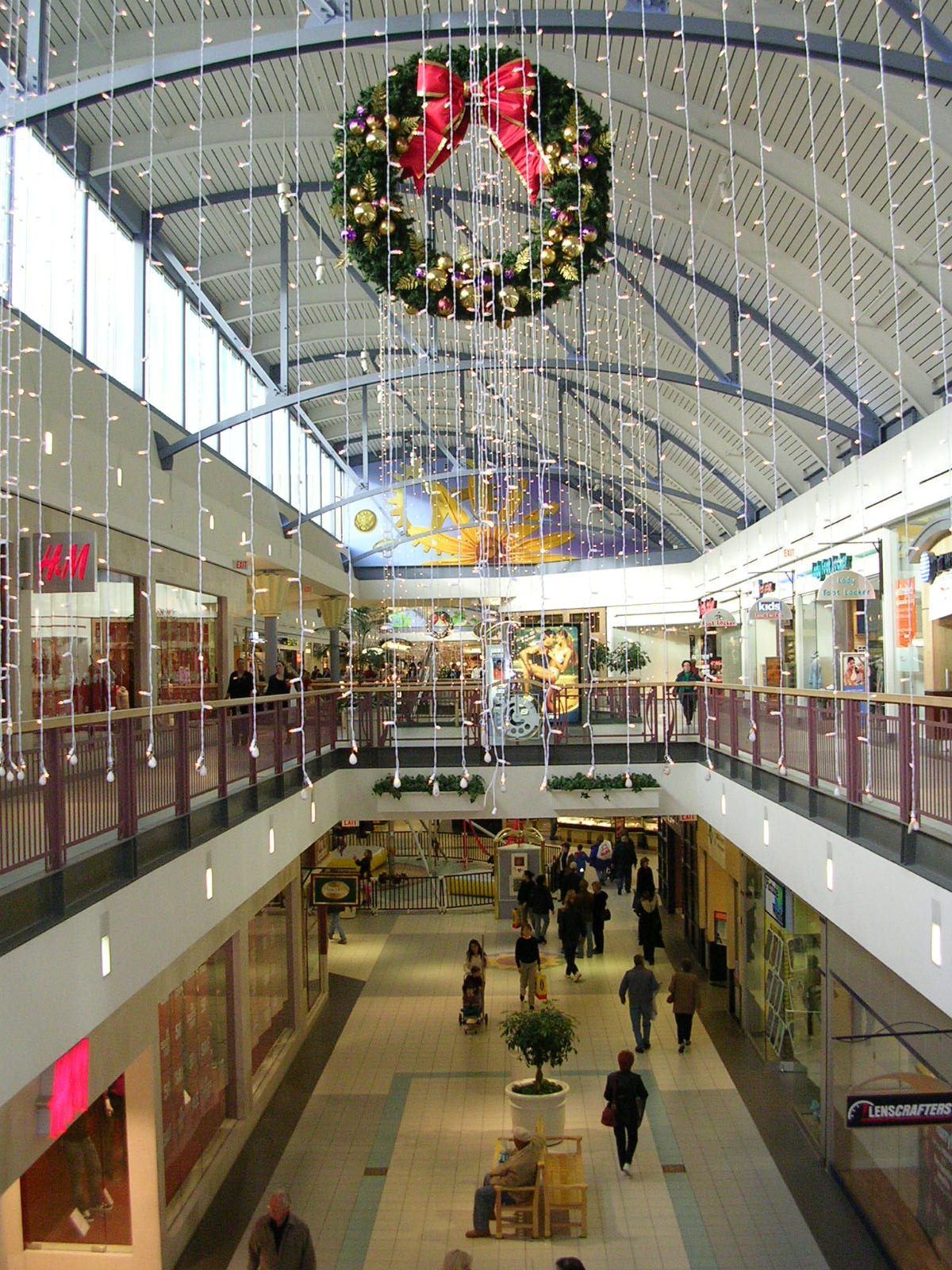
A corridor in the Brass Mill Center, decorated for the 2004 holiday shopping season

Brass Mill Center is a shopping mall in Waterbury, Connecticut. The mall and its accompanying complex, Brass Mill Commons, cost $160 million to build. At 1,180,000 square feet (110,000 m^{2}), it is Connecticut's fifth-largest mall, containing over 130 shops. It is located off I-84 in Waterbury, Connecticut.

== History ==
Brass Mill Center opened on Wednesday, September 17, 1997. It has two floors of stores, and a third floor with a 12-screen Cinema.

Before construction began, 118,000 tons of contaminated soil and 63 vacant and deteriorated buildings were removed from the site. Brass Mill Center essentially replaced the older Naugatuck Valley Mall, built in 1969 and located on the city's northeast suburban side. Filene's and Sears relocated to Brass Mill Center. Naugatuck Valley Mall was demolished in the spring of 1999. Lechmere was originally planned as the fourth anchor, but it never opened, because parent company Montgomery Ward closed the chain in 1997, the same year the mall opened.

On January 12, 2011, Save-A-Lot opened in the former Shaw's.

Toys R Us & Sears both closed in 2018. Macy's closed in 2021.

On April 19, 2022, Kohan Retail Investment Group acquired Brass Mill Center for $44.9 million.

On September 26, 2022, it was announced that Regal Cinemas would close, due to the economic impact of the COVID-19 pandemic.

In December 2023, Ashley HomeStore opened an outlet store in a portion of the old Macy's.

In April 2024, Apple Cinemas opened in the old Regal Cinemas.

On May 27, 2025, a mass shooting occurred inside the mall when a 19-year-old man from Waterbury opened fire in the central part of the mall, injuring five people. Police later responded that the suspect and a male victim knew each other before the shooting, and the incident was a result of a fight that escalated.

Barnes & Noble closed their location on January 18, 2026 alongside the city’s first Starbucks location within the store, as the last original tenant of the mall.

Best Buy opened their location on August 14, 2026.
