= Mayberry Mall =

Shopping mall just outside Mount Airy, North Carolina

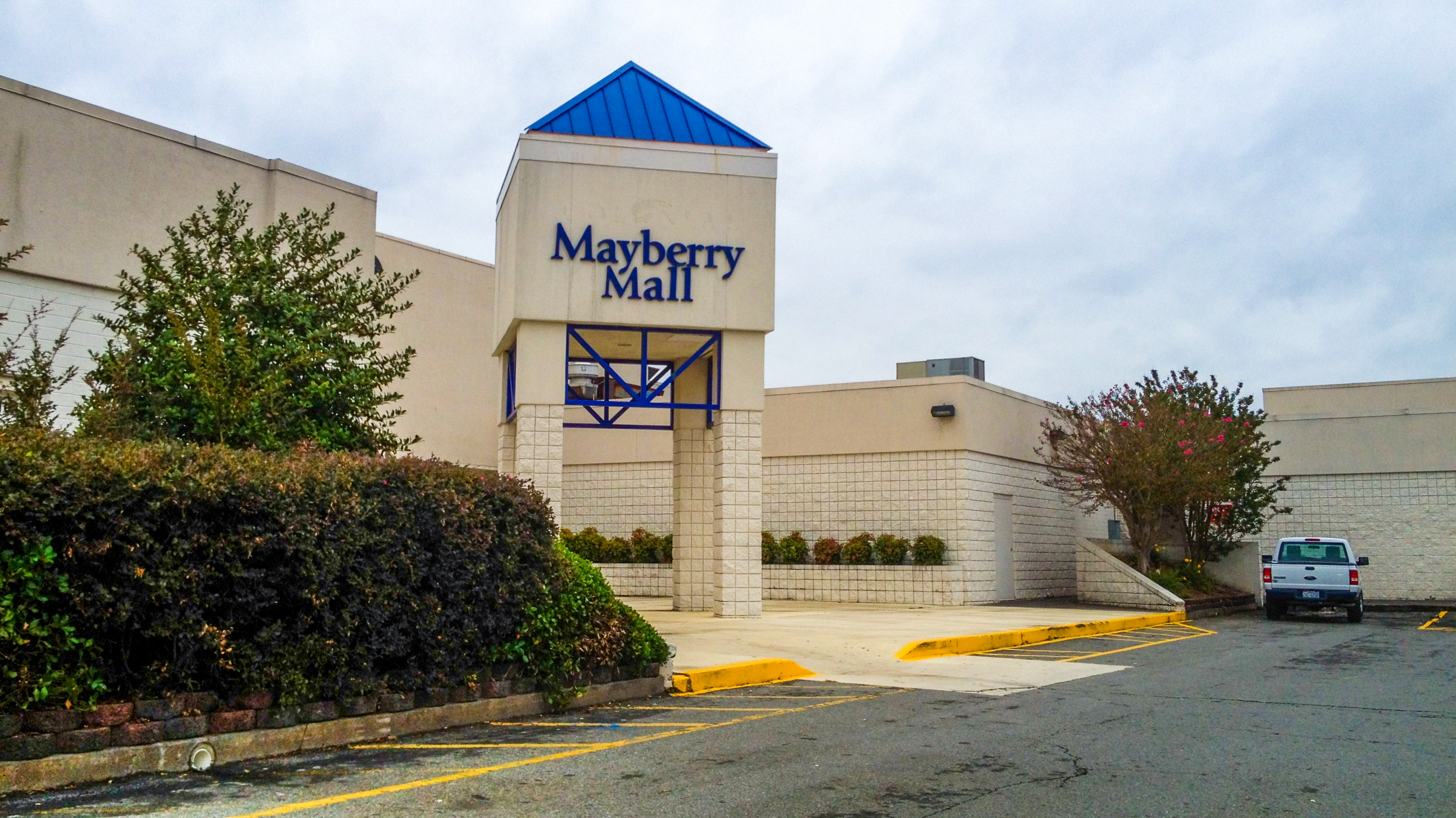
- Exterior view of Mayberry Mall, October 2012
- Location: Mount Airy Township, North Carolina, United States
- Coordinates: 36.50634°N 80.62193°W
- Address: 380 Frederick Street
- Opened: 1968
- Developer: North Surry Realty
- Owner: WRS Inc.
- Num. of stores: 20+
- Num. of anchor tenants: 3
- Floor area: 265,000 sq ft (24,600 m^{2})
- Floors: 1
- Website: www.mayberry-mall.com

Mayberry Mall is a shopping mall located just outside Mount Airy, North Carolina on the east side of U.S. Highway 52. It was named after the fictitious town of Mayberry in which The Andy Griffith Show was based. There are three anchor stores, Belk, Hobby Lobby and Shoe Show. (Doing business as one of Shoe Shows brand names, Shoe Dept.)

Opened in 1968, it is the only shopping center between Winston-Salem, North Carolina and Roanoke, Virginia. One of the original anchor stores was W.T. Grant's Grant City, which closed in 1975 and became Kmart. Kmart closed in 2016. Winn Dixie was also an anchor until it relocated in 1978. Belk was added in 1970, and J. C. Penney moved into the mall in 1987.

On June 8, 2018, JCPenney announced that its store would be closing on July 9, 2018, which left Belk as the only anchor left.

On February 8, 2019, South Carolina based developer WRS Inc. purchased Mayberry Mall from Kohan Retail Investment Group with plans to redevelop the mall. The redevelopment was completed in 2021.

On January 4, 2021, Hobby Lobby opened at Mayberry Mall.
