= Fashion Square Mall =

Shopping mall in Saginaw, Michigan, United States

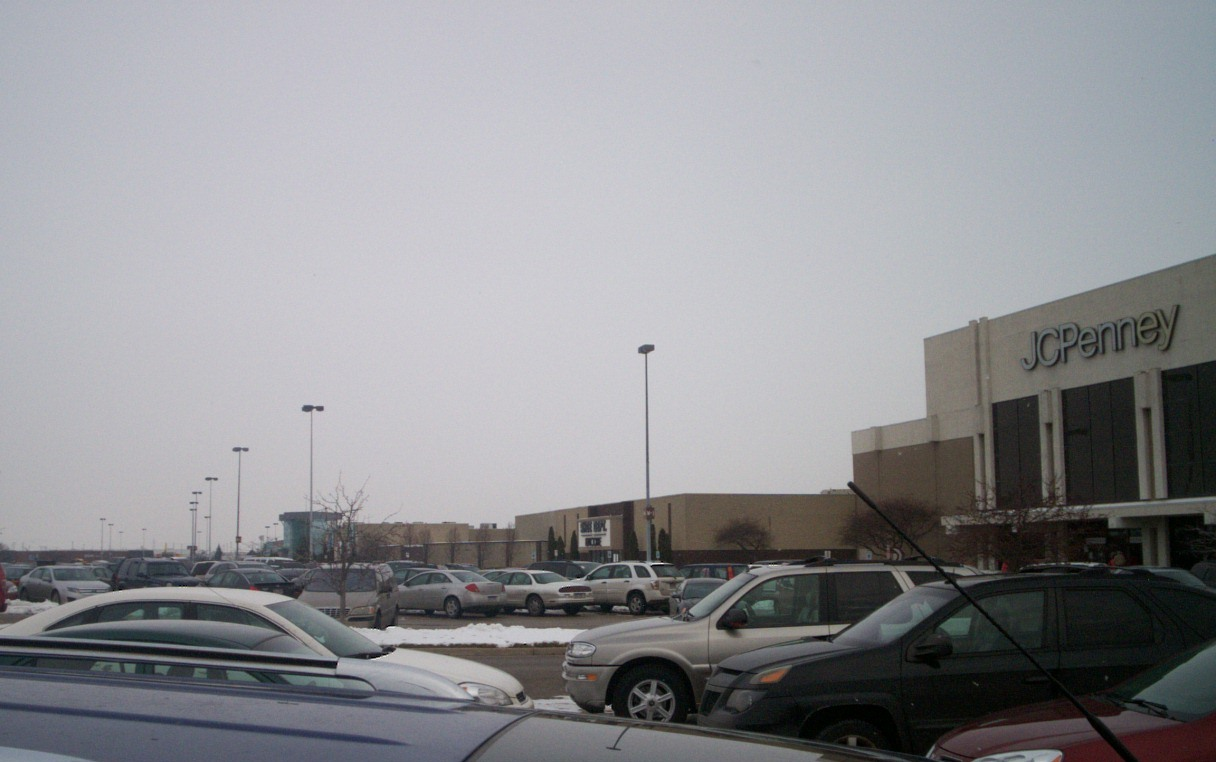
- The mall's south end, showing JCPenney.
- Location: Saginaw Charter Township, Michigan, United States
- Coordinates: 43.476584°N 83.972916°W
- Address: 4787 Fashion Square Mall
- Opened: October 4, 1972; 54 years ago
- Developer: Richard E. Jacobs Group
- Owner: Summit Properties USA
- Num. of stores: 50
- Num. of anchor tenants: 3 (2 open, 1 vacant)
- Floor area: 798,016 sq ft (74,138.1 m^{2})
- Floors: 1 (2 in JCPenney and Macy's)
- Parking: 5235
- Public transit: STARS
- Website: shopfashionsquaremall.com

Fashion Square Mall is an enclosed shopping mall in Saginaw Charter Township, Michigan, United States. It is located on Bay Road (M-84) north of the city of Saginaw, Michigan. The property was constructed in 1972 by the Richard E. Jacobs Group. It opened with Sears and JCPenney as its original anchor stores, along with branches of local department stores Heavenrich's and William C. Weichmann Company. Hudson's was added to the mall in 1976, becoming Marshall Field's and then Macy's. The mall has undergone a number of renovations in its history, including the addition of a food court in the 1990s. Following the closure of Sears, both JCPenney and Macy's remain the mall's anchor stores. Fashion Square Mall is owned and managed by Summit Properties USA.

== History ==
Fashion Square Mall opened on October 4, 1972 with JCPenney and Sears as its major anchor stores. Hudson's, a chain based in Detroit, Michigan, was added in 1976 to the eastern end, as a third major anchor. The mall also included branches of two local department stores: William C. Wiechmann Company and Heavenrich's, the former of which was liquidated in 1992. In 1981, the mall was part of a lawsuit involving the lease of a Big Boy restaurant which operated within. CBL Properties bought the mall from its developer, Richard E. Jacobs Group, in 2000.

A$10 million mall-wide renovation was completed in 2001, with the addition of new seating areas, family restrooms, and automatic doors. The same year, reflecting nameplate consolidation by Hudson's parent Target Corp., the mall's eastern anchor was re-branded as Marshall Field's, and by 2006, Marshall Field's would be among several nameplates to be converted to the Macy's name. Dunham's Sports also moved out in the 2000s, with Steve & Barry's taking its place in 2005. Steve & Barry's closed in December 2008 after the chain declared bankruptcy. McDonald's closed its food court location in January 2009, as did a Garfield's restaurant in May, only six months after opening in a space vacated by Ruby Tuesday. The Shoe Department Encore replaced the former Steve & Barry's space in mid-2010.

Seitner's Department Store and Wiechmann’s Department Store were tenants.

In January 2010, the JCPenney store underwent a remodel, including the addition of a Sephora cosmetics store. Further renovations in 2011 included the addition of Dressbarn and Maurices clothing stores, plus a local restaurant called Willow Tree in the former Ruby Tuesday/Garfield's space. An H&M opened in fall 2016.

On August 6, 2019, it was announced that Sears would be closing as part of a plan to close 26 stores nationwide. The store closed in October 2019.

In September 2020, Namdar Realty Group requested a deed in lieu to give up Fashion Square Mall. As a result, the mall is now managed by the Farbman Group. Kohan Retail Investment Group bought the mall at auction for $10.8 million in September 2022.

H&M closed at the mall in 2025. The mall's food court closed in 2026 to make way for a new Dunham's Sports location.
