= Staunton Mall =

Former shopping mall in Staunton, Virginia, United States

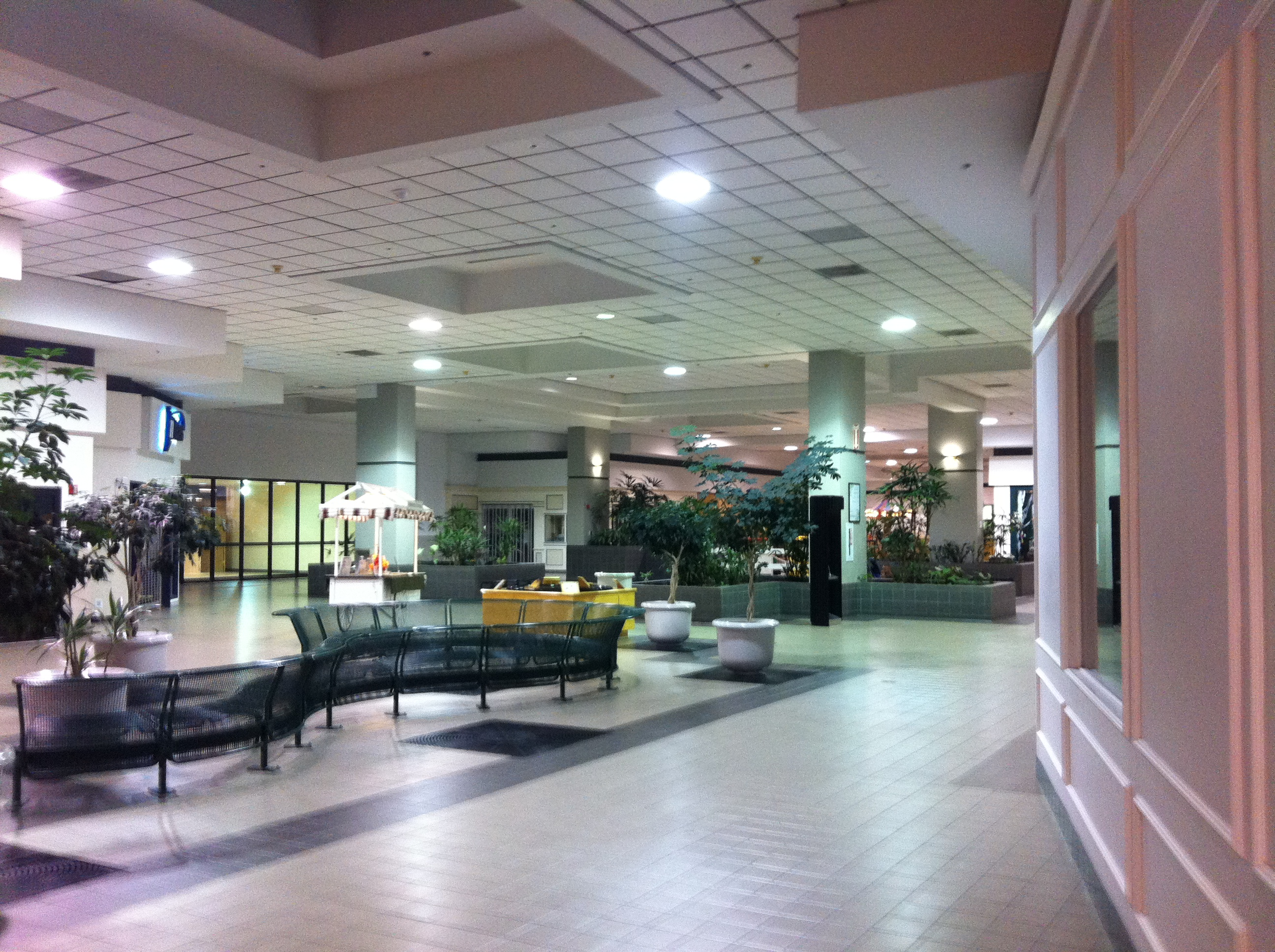
- An interior corridor of Staunton Mall in 2011
- Location: Staunton, Virginia, United States
- Coordinates: 38°7′26.5″N 79°3′47.6″W
- Address: 90 Lee Jackson Highway
- Opened: 1968
- Closed: December 24, 2020
- Demolished: 2022
- Previous names: Staunton Plaza (1968–1987)
- Developer: Rosenfeld Realty
- Owner: Staunton EM 2 LLC
- Num. of stores: 50+ at peak
- Num. of anchor tenants: 6
- Floor area: 422,000 square feet (39,200 m^{2})
- Floors: 1

Staunton Mall was a shopping mall in Staunton, Virginia, United States. Opened in 1968 as Staunton Plaza, it closed on December 24, 2020, and was demolished in 2023, except for the Belk anchor store, which remains open as a freestanding store.

== History ==
Staunton Plaza was developed by Rosenfeld Realty, and construction began in 1966. The Montgomery Ward anchor store opened on September 19, 1968. It was followed by a Safeway supermarket, one month later. J. C. Penney opened in April 1969, following a fire at their previous location in Staunton three months prior. The Staunton Plaza location was the chain's 21st in the state of Virginia. Other major tenants of the center included Woolworth and Peoples Drug. The completed mall consisted of an open-air concourse connecting the JCPenney and Montgomery Ward stores, with approximately 300,000 square feet (28,000 m^{2}) of mall shop space and parking for about 2,000 cars.

Safeway closed its Staunton Plaza store and a second in nearby Waynesboro, Virginia in late 1982, after members of the United Food and Commercial Workers entered into a labor dispute with the chain, combined with increased competition from another non-union supermarket that had locations in both towns. In 1984, their space at the mall was sold to Sears, which operated it as an outlet store specializing in overstocked merchandise from other Sears stores and catalog merchants.

Covington Co., which owned the plaza at the time, announced renovation plans in 1986. The existing open-air concourse between JCPenney and Montgomery Ward was enclosed, while further mall shops were added, for a total of 70 stores in 400,000 square feet (37,000 m^{2}) of retail space. Included in the expansion was a third anchor store, South Boston, Virginia-based Leggett, which opened in February 1987. Leggett had operated a store in Staunton since the 1930s. Once renovations were complete, the property was officially renamed Staunton Mall.

Despite these renovations, two major stores at the mall closed soon after. The Sears outlet store was shuttered in 1989 due to declining sales. The space became a Goody's clothing store in October 1993. Also in October 1993, the Woolworth company announced that the Staunton Mall store would be closed by January 1994 as part of a company-wide restructuring that involved renovation or closure of older stores.

In 1996, Staunton Mall was renovated by then-owners Steven D. Bell and Co. The food court was moved closer to the theater. The previous food court, added in the 1986-87 renovations, became additional mall space. A fountain was removed in the center court, the mall exterior was repainted and received new canopies, and Stone & Thomas opened in the vacated Woolworth.

The mall was purchased by Colonial Properties Trust in 1998 and renamed Colonial Mall Staunton in October 1998. At the same time, Stone & Thomas closed and was replaced by Peebles, and the Leggett store was renamed Belk. The Montgomery Ward anchor closed in early 2001, when that chain went out of business. Colonial Properties negotiated unsuccessfully with several chains to replace the vacated anchor, including Target, Sears, and Old Navy. This space became Steve & Barry's in 2004. Gold's Gym opened in 2006, replacing Goody's, after that chain decided not to renew its lease.

The mall was sold again in 2007, to First Republic Group Realty, which returned the mall's name to Staunton Mall. Under their ownership, the Steve & Barry's store vacated, while Books-A-Million moved to a larger store in Waynesboro. After First Republic filed for bankruptcy in 2009, the mall was sold again, to the Kohan Retail Investment Group and in 2014 to Staunton Mall LLC. The Peebles anchor store closed in March 2018. The mall was sold again in 2020. On November 24, 2020, it was announced that all remaining tenants (except Belk) would vacate the property in thirty days. The mall closed on December 24, 2020.

On June 4, 2020, JCPenney announced it close by October 2020, as part of a plan to close 154 stores nationwide. By 2021, Belk was the only remaining store and plans for demolition were announced by the mall's owners.

In March 2022, demolition began with the J. C. Penney anchor store. By February 2023, the entire mall (with the exception of Belk, which remains open) was demolished.
