= Adrian Mall =

Shopping mall in Michigan, US

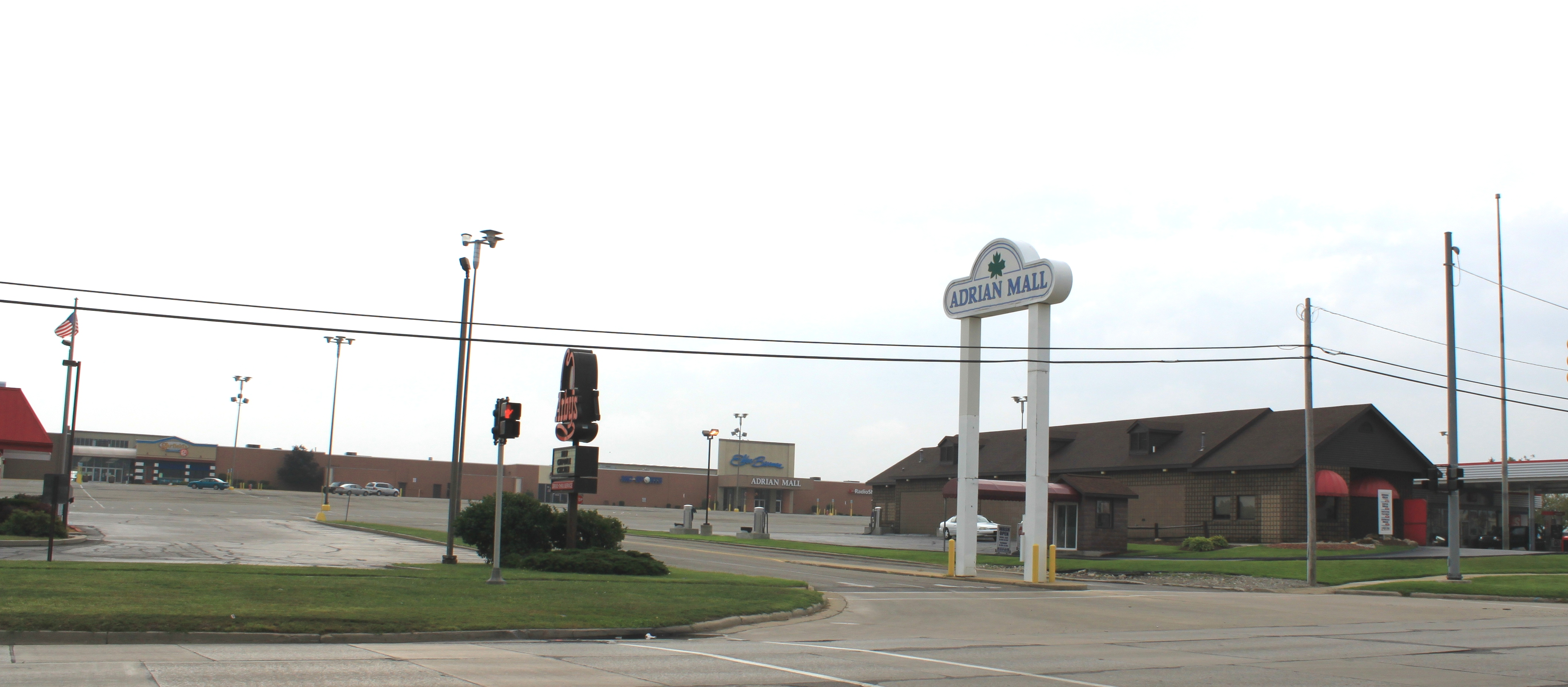
- Exterior view (September 2011)
- Location: Adrian, Michigan, US
- Coordinates: 41.88°N 84.04°W
- Address: 1357 S. Main St
- Opened: September 3, 1970; 56 years ago
- Closed: June 16, 2020; 6 years ago
- Developer: Mike Howard
- Owner: Rocket Investment Group
- Num. of stores: 3
- Num. of anchor tenants: 5 (3 open, 2 vacant)
- Floor area: 373,000 square feet (34,700 m^{2})
- Floors: 1

Adrian Mall was an enclosed shopping center serving Adrian, Michigan, United States. It opened in 1970 with JCPenney and Sears as its anchor stores; an expansion in 1985 added Elder-Beerman as a third. The mall remained largely unchanged until the 21st century, at which point many of the stores began closing. A portion of the mall was removed for Dunham's Sports, while JCPenney, Sears, and Elder-Beerman all closed. The former Sears location is split between Ollie's Bargain Outlet and Hobby Lobby. The mall is owned and managed by Kohan Retail Investment Group.

== History ==
Adrian Mall opened on September 3, 1970. At the time, the mall included Sears and F. W. Woolworth Company as its anchor stores, with JCPenney opening as the third anchor in April 1971.

In 1985, the mall underwent a $1.5 million renovation, which included the addition of an Elder-Beerman department store.

The mall underwent several management changes in the 2000s. General Growth Properties managed it starting in 2002, CBL & Associates Properties managed it in starting in 2008, and it was managed again by Jones Lang LaSalle in 2010. In December 2014, Texas-based Tabani Group purchased the Adrian Mall for an undisclosed amount. A firm spokesman said it planned to make the mall a premier shopping destination and hoped to form partnerships with area businesses and organizations.

=== Decline ===
The mall lost several merchants in 2009, including Waldenbooks and one of the last Sam Goody stores. Sears closed in 2012. In 2013, renovation plans were announced, which included the conversion of part of the Sears store into a Hobby Lobby. The plans also included the introduction of a Buffalo Wild Wings, as well as the expansion of MC Sports' existing store.

JCPenney announced the closure of its Adrian Mall store in January 2015. Dunham's Sports took over the former JCPenney wing, which includes the MC Sports store that had closed in late 2015. Dunham's Sports had a grand opening on May 20, 2016. Elder-Beerman closed in April 2018 due to Bon-Ton Stores filing for bankruptcy.

In 2019, Kohan Retail Investment Group bought the mall. Under the new ownership, new locally owned businesses started to open in the mall.

In March 2020, the mall was almost condemned due to serious roof issues, water damage, and other problems, but the mall pulled a permit for a roof replacement, allowing them to stay open. Although the conditions for the mall staying open were a complete roof replacement by April 11, little work was done, and in the face of worsening issues the mall was condemned on June 16, 2020. The mall was given until July 31 to fix the issues or remain closed. Hobby Lobby and Dunham's Sports were not affected, and were allowed to remain open. As of Oct 3, 2023, the mall has permanently closed and has fallen into disrepair.

On July 5, 2020, Corta Development, which purchased the former Sears building, announced that the portion not occupied by Hobby Lobby will be remodeled and expanded to become Ollie's Bargain Outlet. The store opened on March 24, 2021.

On January 13, 2023, Pastor CJ Clymer of NewLife Church, which previously operated in the mall from Easter 2018 to when it was condemned in June 16, 2020, along with the Adrian Development Group and The Collaborative of Toledo, had the first phase of their redevelopment plan approved by the Adrian Planning Commission. The plan would have seen the establishment of a standalone Dairy Queen in a outparcel lot between the Buffalo Wild Wings and the neighboring McDonald's, the former Elder-Beerman space turned into a worship space and community center for NewLife Church, and the demolition of the condemned portion of the mall, with later plans to turn the mall into a mixed-use facility with multifamily housing/condominiums, other business tenants, and a self storage facility in the former JCPenney's.

In 2025, the city issued a demolish order on the condemned portion of the mall with the deadline set for June 2025. At this point, the only completed portion of the redevelopment plan that was approved in 2023 was NewLife Church having moved back to the mall. After the owners missed the June 2025 deadline, they were given a 2 month extension.

In 2026, the mall was renamed into the Howard Center when it was acquired by developer Rocket Investment Group with the redevelopment project run by Toledo developer Mike Howard, who is also redeveloping Barron Commons in Tecumseh, Michigan. Plans include the creation of two new outparcel lots in the mall's parking lot, the redevelopment of 200,000 square feet of retail space, and converting the former JCPenney's into Captain Emma's Indoor Self Storage, along with exterior renovations, updated landscaping, and a new sign. Howard has estimated that could exceed $70 million and take 4 to 5 years.
