= Lima Mall =

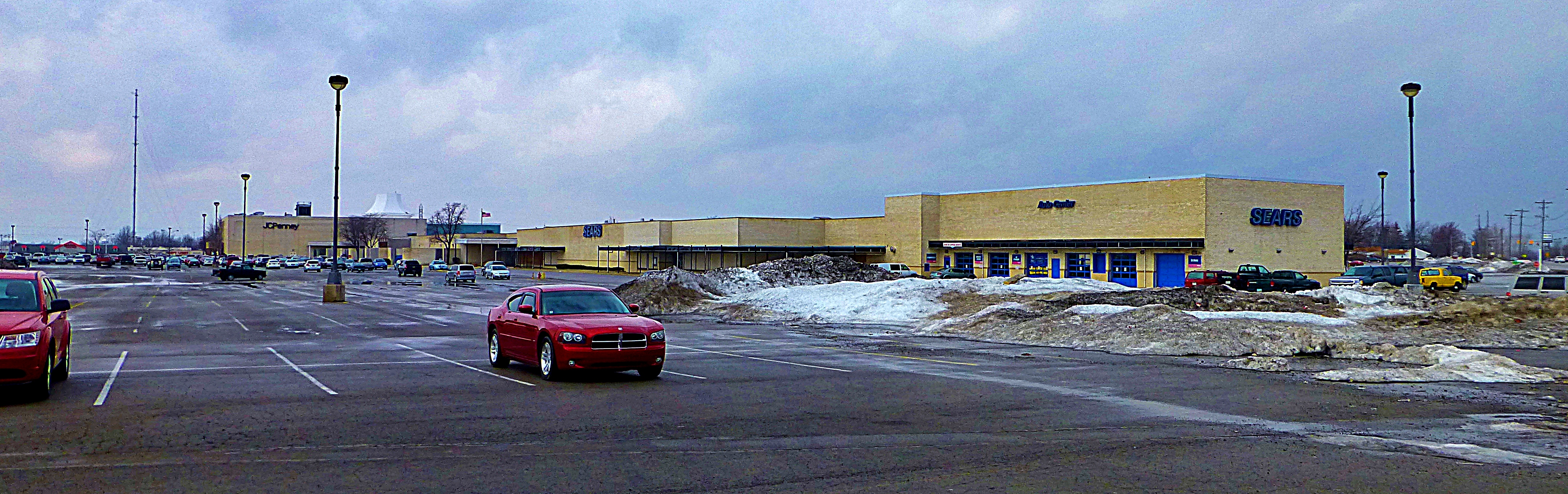
- Lima Mall in March 2014.
- Location: American Township, Ohio
- Coordinates: 40°46′0″N 84°9′0″W
- Address: 2400 Elida Road
- Opened: November 18, 1965
- Developer: Edward J. DeBartolo, Sr.
- Owner: Kohan Retail Investment Group
- Num. of stores: 30+
- Num. of anchor tenants: 4 (1 open, 2 vacant, 1 under construction)
- Floor area: 742,000 sq ft (68,900 m^{2})
- Floors: 1 (Partial 2nd in JCPenney, 3 in former Macy's)
- Public transit: ACRTA

Lima Mall is an enclosed shopping mall in American Township, Ohio. It is currently anchored by JCPenney with two vacant anchors last occupied by Elder-Beerman and Sears. A third vacant anchor once occupied by Macy's was demolished in 2025 to make way for Target opening in November 2026. In February 2024, the Kohan Retail Investment Group and Rocky Companies acquired the Lima Mall.

== History ==
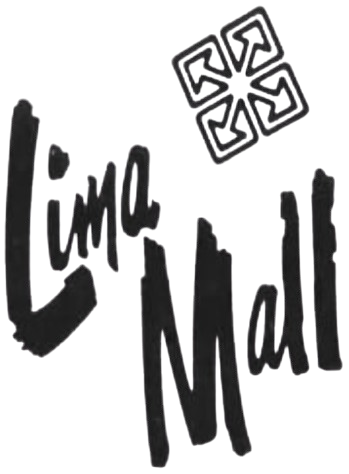
Lima Mall logo from 1974

Lima Mall first opened in 1965. Originally 166,000 square feet in size, the mall was one of the first smaller, regional centers built by Edward J. DeBartolo, Sr. Lazarus was added as an anchor in 1971. Another anchor, a local department store called The Leader, was sold to Elder-Beerman in the mid-1970s. An F. W. Woolworth Company store closed at the mall in mid-1997. The Lazarus store became Lazarus-Macy's in 2003, then dropped the Lazarus name in 2005.

In January 2013, Old Navy moved from its existing store to a space previously occupied by New York & Company, with The Shoe Department Encore replacing Old Navy's former store. On October 21, 2015, parent company The Bon-Ton announced that it would close the Elder-Beerman in the mall in January 2016.

MC Sports closed in 2017 due to bankruptcy.

On May 31, 2018, Sears announced that its store would also be closing as part of a plan to close 78 stores nationwide. The store closed on September 2, 2018.

On December 22, 2020, Macy's announced that it would be closing its location at Lima Mall on March 21, 2021 as part of a plan to close 46 stores nationwide which left JCPenney as the only anchor.

In February 2025, Target finalized the purchase of the former Macy's property. The building was demolished in May 2025, and will be replaced with a brand new Target store, with an expected opening date of November 2026.
