= Crystal River Mall =

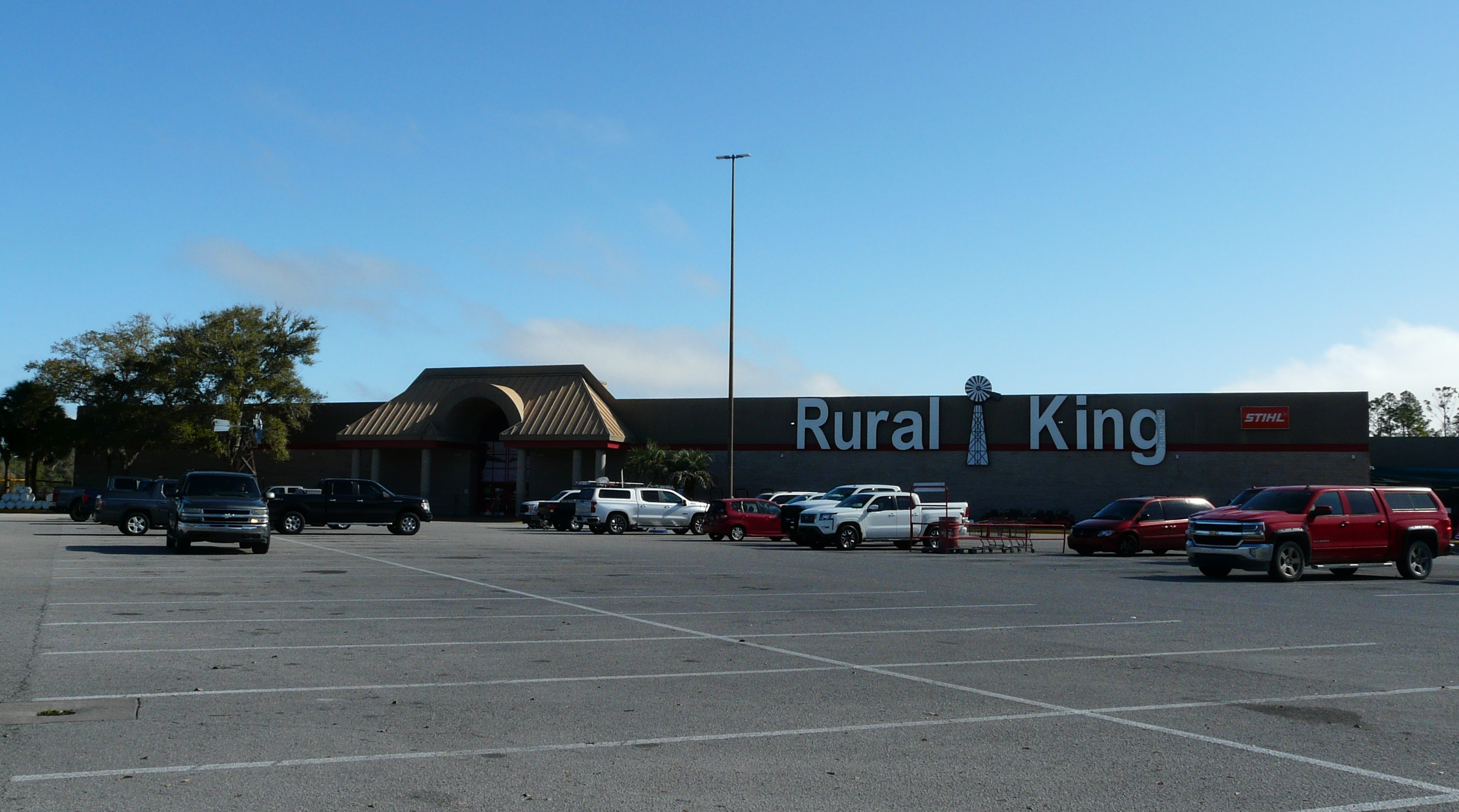
- Rural King, the mall's sole remaining store
- Location: Crystal River, Florida, United States
- Coordinates: 28.910531°N 82.603295°W
- Address: 1801 US-19
- Opened: October 17, 1990
- Closed: August 20, 2022
- Demolished: 2023
- Developer: Edward J. DeBartolo, Sr.
- Owner: United Realty
- Num. of anchor tenants: 4 (1 open)
- Floor area: 29,265 sq ft (2,718.8 m^{2})
- Floors: 1

Crystal River Mall was an enclosed shopping mall in Crystal River, Florida, United States. It opened in 1990, closed in 2022, and was demolished in 2023. It was anchored by Rural King, which remains open.

== History ==
Edward J. DeBartolo Corporation proposed Crystal River Mall in 1988, with an announced opening date of mid-1990. The mall opened on October 17, 1990, with guest appearances from Phyllis Diller, Jack Jones, and The Lettermen. Upon opening, it included three anchor stores: Belk-Lindsey, Sears, and Kmart, with approximately 85 percent of the inline retail space occupied. The mall's floor plan was described by a DeBartolo spokesperson as "a giant wheel with spokes", with a food court occupying the center. It also featured a 65-foot-high fabric roof, which required an exception from city council. J. Byrons had originally been proposed as the fourth anchor. Instead, the fourth anchor site was sold to JCPenney, which opened on September 30, 1992. Regal Entertainment Group added a movie theater to the mall in 1998. OfficeMax opened in the south area of the mall in 1999.

=== Decline and demolition ===
In the 2000s, the mall became increasingly vacant due in part to its location: while it was built to the north side of Crystal River, most of the city's retail development occurred to the south instead.

By 2011, it was at 77 percent vacancy, making it one of the least-tenanted malls owned by Simon Property Group, which bought the DeBartolo corporation. Simon had also closed the mall office and neglected to maintain the building, which by 2011 had a leaking roof. The mall entered foreclosure in 2011 and was sold to Boxer Properties of Dallas, Texas. Sears closed its store in 2012, followed by JCPenney in 2013. On August 2, 2013, it was announced Belk would be closing sometime mid-January 2014. Rural King took over the vacated Sears in 2014. On December 31, 2016, it was announced that Sears Holdings was closing some 180 additional stores, among which was mall anchor Kmart. The Kmart closed on March 26, 2017, leaving roughly 60 employees without jobs, some of whom could either apply at the few remaining local stores, or receive severance pay if they were employed full-time. Regal Cinemas and OfficeMax both closed in 2020.

Crystal River city council-elect Cindi Guy suggested putting a future City Hall inside one of the storefronts at Crystal River Mall, as a means of revitalizing possible occupancy inside of the mall.

On July 5, 2022, it was announced that the mall would be closing on August 30, 2022; it instead closed on August 20. However, Rural King did not close. In October 2022, it was announced that demolition of the mall would begin in March 2023. Interior demolition began in June 2023 and exterior demolition began on July 10, 2023.
