= Berkshire Mall (Massachusetts) =

Coordinates: 42°29′33″N 73°12′24″W

- Location: Lanesborough, Massachusetts
- Address: Old State Road & Route 8
- Opened: September 21, 1988; 38 years ago
- Closed: May 28, 2019
- Developer: The Pyramid Companies
- Owner: Town of Lanesborough
- Num. of stores: 75 capacity
- Num. of anchor tenants: 1
- Floor area: 717,900 square feet (67,000 m^{2}) (GLA)
- Floors: 1

Berkshire Mall was a shopping mall located in Lanesborough, Massachusetts, outside Pittsfield. The mall was built in 1988 and closed in 2019. It could be reached from both Route 8 and U.S. Route 7. As of 2025, the mall's one remaining tenant is the Target anchor store.

== History ==
The mall opened on September 21, 1988. The original anchor stores at the mall were Hills (later Ames), JCPenney, Sears, Service Merchandise, and local chain Steiger's. Steiger's sold its locations to Filene's (later Macy's) in 1994. Service Merchandise closed in 1999. The building was razed and replaced with Best Buy and Linens 'n Things in 2002. Ames closed in 2001, and was replaced with a Target in January 2006. An Old Navy store was added to the mall in 2000.

In 2016, Strategic Mall Services (operating as Berkshire Mall LLC) sold the mall to Kohan Retail Property Group.

On January 6, 2016, Macy's announced their anchor store would close. On March 17, 2017, JCPenney announced their anchor store would close. On November 2, 2017, Sears announced their anchor store would close.

On May 28, 2019, the mall concourse closed, leaving only Target and Regal Cinemas open. On February 1, 2022, it was reported that Regal Cinemas had closed, leaving only Target open.

In April 2023, it was reported that the owners of the property were in negotiations with new tenants who wish to convert the former mall retail space into an indoor cannabis cultivation facility. In October 2023, it was announced that these plans had been scrapped due to a slowing cannabis market, in favor of plans for a complex of 400–600 apartments for older people.
