= Central Mall (Port Arthur, Texas) =

- Location: Port Arthur, Texas, United States
- Coordinates: 29.948°N 93.989°W
- Address: 3100 Highway 365
- Opened: 1982
- Developer: Warmack Company
- Owner: Joe Aref Development & Investment Group
- Num. of stores: 64
- Num. of anchor tenants: 8 (6 open, 2 vacant)
- Floor area: 705,158 square feet (66,000 m^{2})
- Floors: 1
- Website: centralmallportarthur.com

Central Mall is an enclosed shopping mall in Port Arthur, Texas, United States. Opened in 1982, it features Dillard's, J. C. Penney, Target, TJ Maxx, Crunch Fitness , Five Below and a B&B Theatre.

== History ==
The mall opened in 1982 with J. C. Penney, Dillard's, Sears, Bealls (now Stage), and The White House. Target was added in 2004. Hurricane Rita destroyed the roof of the Dillard's store, which reopened in 2006. Hobby Lobby, which replaced the former White House store, was damaged beyond repair. Hobby Lobby is also now closed. Other parts of the mall sustained roof damage as well.

Bed Bath & Beyond joined the mall in late 2006-early 2007. Steve & Barry's, added in 2005, closed in 2008. The space was previously Old Navy, which closed in 2004.

In 2013, TJ Maxx and Shoe Dept. Encore were added. The former replaced a Luby's and a Gap which had closed in 2005, and the latter replaced the former Old Navy/Steve & Barry's.

On December 28, 2018, it was announced that Sears would be closing as part of a plan to close 80 stores nationwide. The store closed in March 2019.

On September 15, 2022, it was announced that Bed Bath & Beyond would be closing as part of a plan to close 150 stores nationwide.

In February 2024, 4th Dimension Properties acquired the Central Mall and announced that they are making additions and improvements to the mall.

In September 2024, Crunch Fitness was announced that it’s coming soon into the old Stage and is supposed to open in winter 2025

In July 2025, it was announced that the mall had been purchased by local developer Joe Aref of The Joe Aref Development & Investment Group, and his business partner Sultan Jasani. At the time of the purchase, major renovations were in progress, with the goal of revitalizing the space and attracting new visitors. While details were kept under wraps, the new owners revealed that one of the biggest changes included the introduction of six new large anchor stores, expected to open by the end of the year. In addition, they announced that Cici's Pizza would be opening in the former Jason's Deli space, and Alltitude Trampoline Park will be taking over the old Hobby Lobby space next to Crunch Fitness.
