= Central Plaza (Oklahoma) =

Coordinates: 34.6036°N 98.3922°W

- Location: Lawton, Oklahoma
- Opened: 1979
- Previous names: Central Mall (1979–2021)
- Developer: Warmack Company
- Owner: Lawton, Oklahoma
- Num. of anchor tenants: 3
- Floor area: 526,484 sq ft (48,912.0 m^{2})
- Parking: 3,020 spaces

Central Plaza, formerly Central Mall, is a shopping mall located in Lawton, Oklahoma that opened in 1979 and was last renovated in 2002. The mall is anchored by FISTA and JCPenney.

== History ==
Central Mall was suffering from gang issues in April 2007. The mall experienced flooding issues in June 2016. Sears closed at the mall in 2017, with Dillard's later closing in 2020. The City of Lawton purchased Central Mall for $14.6 million in early January 2021 from the Kohan Retail Investment Group. The FISTA Development Trust Authority holds a 25-year lease to house various defense related businesses in the mall.

Central Mall was renamed Central Plaza in August 2021 and redevelopment plans were also announced. renovations began early 2022, and several shops left.
