= List of GGP shopping malls =

The following is a list of properties owned by Brookfield Properties, a North American commercial real estate company. Their portfolio includes a number of shopping malls in the United States that are owned by its American retail subsidiary, GGP (formerly General Growth Properties, which Brookfield rebranded to in January 2026) after the original company was acquired by them in 2018, along with a number of malls that were formerly owned by Rouse Properties prior to its buyout by Brookfield, and The Rouse Company, The Hahn Company, and Homart Development Company.

== United States ==
=== Alabama ===
- Riverchase Galleria

=== Arkansas ===
- Pinnacle Hills Promenade

=== California ===
- Galleria at Tyler
- Glendale Galleria
- NewPark Mall
- Northridge Fashion Center
- Otay Ranch Town Center
- Promenade Temecula
- Stonestown Galleria
- Valley Plaza
- Visalia Mall

=== Colorado ===
- Southwest Plaza
- Park Meadows

=== Delaware ===
- Christiana Mall

=== Florida ===
- Altamonte Mall
- Coastland Center
- Governor's Square
- Miami Design District
- Mizner Park
- Pembroke Lakes Mall
- Shops at Merrick Park

=== Georgia ===
- Augusta Mall
- Cumberland Mall
- Oglethorpe Mall
- Peachtree Mall
- Perimeter Mall
- The Shoppes at River Crossing

=== Hawaii ===
- Ala Moana Center
- Prince Kuhio Plaza
- Whalers Village

=== Idaho ===
- Boise Towne Square
- Grand Teton Mall

=== Illinois ===
- Market Place Shopping Center
- Northbrook Court
- Oakbrook Center

=== Iowa ===
- Coral Ridge Mall
- Jordan Creek Town Center

=== Kentucky ===
- Mall St. Matthews
- Oxmoor Center

=== Louisiana ===
- Mall of Louisiana
- Oakwood Center

=== Maine ===
- The Maine Mall

=== Maryland ===
- The Gallery at Harborplace
- The Mall in Columbia
- Mondawmin Mall
- Towson Town Center

=== Massachusetts ===
- Natick Mall

=== Minnesota ===
- Apache Mall
- Ridgedale Center

=== Missouri ===
- Columbia Mall

=== Nebraska ===
- Westroads Mall

=== Nevada ===
- Fashion Show Las Vegas
- Grand Canal Shoppes
- Meadows Mall

=== New Jersey ===
- Willowbrook

=== New Mexico ===
- Coronado Center

=== New York ===
- Crown Building
- Staten Island Mall
- 218 W. 57th Street
- 685 Fifth Avenue

=== North Carolina ===
- Carolina Place
- Four Seasons Town Centre
- Greenville Mall
- The Streets at Southpoint

=== Ohio ===
- Kenwood Towne Centre

=== Oklahoma ===
- Quail Springs Mall
- Sooner Mall

=== Oregon ===
- Clackamas Town Center
- Pioneer Place

=== Pennsylvania ===
- Park City Center

=== South Carolina ===
- Columbiana Centre

=== Texas ===
- Baybrook Mall
- Deerbrook Mall
- First Colony Mall
- Hulen Mall
- North Star Mall
- The Parks Mall at Arlington
- The Shops at La Cantera
- Stonebriar Centre
- Town East Mall
- Willowbrook Mall
- The Woodlands Mall

=== Utah ===
- Fashion Place

=== Virginia ===
- Lynnhaven Mall
- Short Pump Town Center
- Tysons Galleria

=== Washington (state) ===
- Alderwood
- The Shops at the Bravern (in partnership with the Ashkenazy Acquisition Corporation)
- Spokane Valley Mall
- Westlake Center

=== Wisconsin ===
- Fox River Mall
- Mayfair
- Oakwood Mall
