= Three Rivers Crossing =

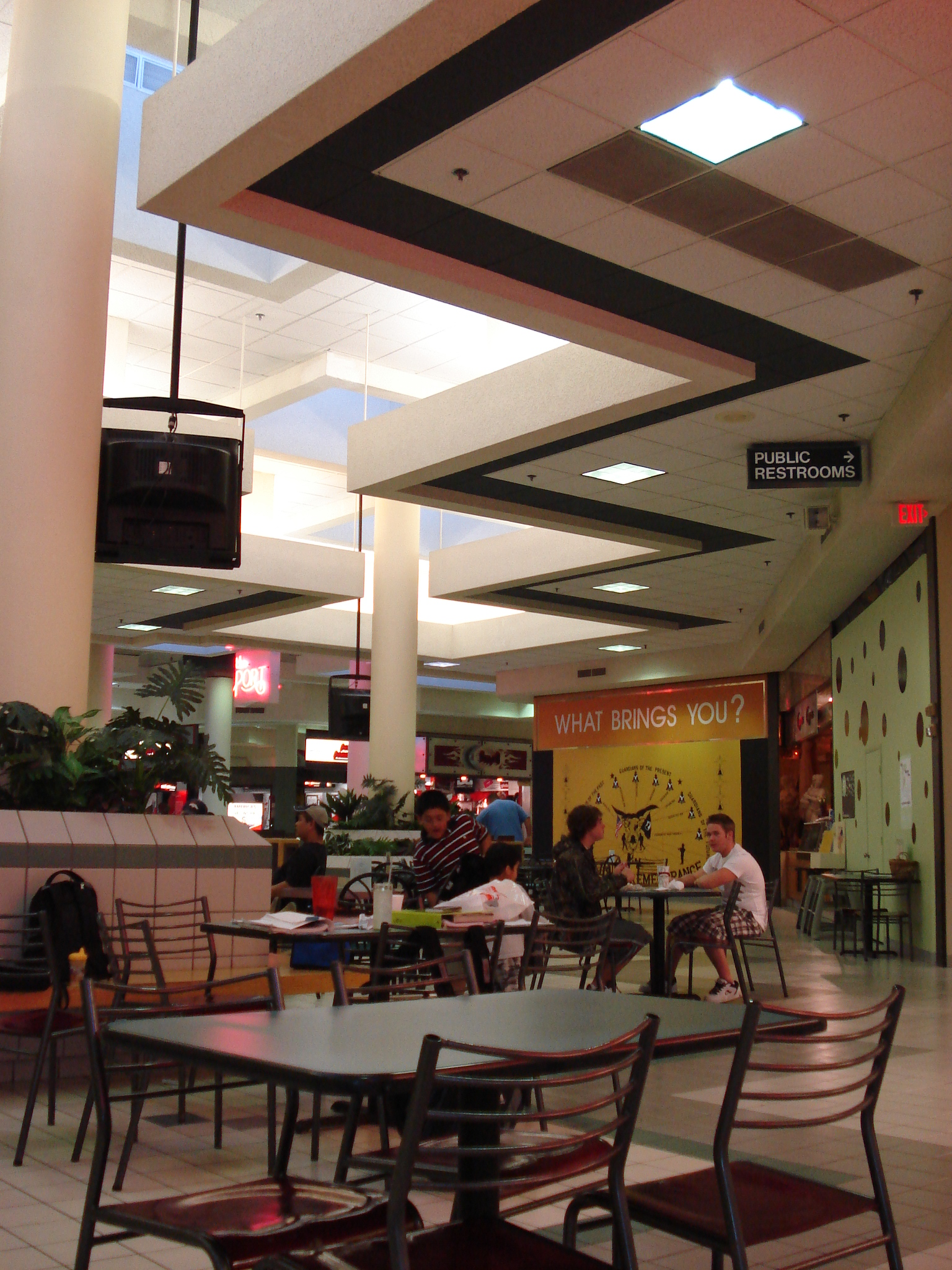
- Food court (December 2007)
- Location: Kelso, Washington, United States
- Coordinates: 46.1401303°N 122.901423°W
- Address: 351 Three Rivers Drive
- Opened: 1987
- Previous names: Three Rivers Mall
- Developer: Price Development Corporation
- Manager: Three Rivers Development Group
- Owner: Three Rivers Development Group
- Num. of stores: 32
- Num. of anchor tenants: 4 (3 open, 1 vacant)
- Floor area: 561,755 square feet (52,188.7 m^{2})
- Floors: 1
- Website: Official website

Three Rivers Crossing is an enclosed shopping mall located in Kelso, Washington that opened in 1987, on the site of a former golf course adjacent to Interstate 5. The mall was built on top of dredge spoils from the ash that ran down the rivers from Mount St. Helens after the volcano erupted on May 18, 1980. Originally developed by Price Development Co. and later sold to General Growth Properties, the mall was one of 30 malls that was spun off into Rouse Properties in 2012. Rouse was acquired by Brookfield Asset Management in 2016. General Growth Properties itself was acquired by Brookfield Property Partners in 2018. In July 2019, Brookfield Properties sold the mall to Arizona-based Three Rivers Village, LLC. In November, 2024, the mall was sold to a new ownership group known as Three Rivers Development Group.

The mall has three anchors: JCPenney, Sportsman's Warehouse, and Regal Cinemas. Its original main anchors were The Bon Marche (which became Macy's; closed 2017), JCPenney, Sears (closed 2013), and Emporium (closed 2001).

The Kelso Public Library moved its main branch to the mall in 2011.

The mall also has several freestanding businesses: Safeway (originally TOP Food & Drug), Target (opened 1990), and Pier 1 Imports (which closed in 2020 along with the rest of the chain). There are also several freestanding restaurants: Red Lobster, Panera Bread, and Fiesta Bonita Mexican Restaurant. The former Izzy's Pizza has reopened as an Asian Buffet restaurant. Regal Cinemas operated a freestanding theater until January 2015, when it relocated into the main mall.

== History ==
While the mall opened to great fanfare in 1987, bringing a variety of new stores to the area, as well as the relocation of Sears, JCPenney, and The Bon Marche from nearby downtown Longview, Washington.

The mall began to struggle in the early 2000s, starting with the closure of the Emporium chain. A few tenants, such as a used car showroom, a seasonal Halloween store, and a church, occupied the former Emporium for brief periods of time until 2014. The decline in foot traffic prompted many smaller retailers to close, and some chains present in the mall such as Radio Shack, Sam Goody, and KB Toys, were also closed as those chains struggled. The food court also dwindled down to a couple of local tenants. Sears announced late in 2012 that they would close their store in the mall in January 2013, which further reduced foot traffic. Among the businesses that left after Sears closed were Big 5 Sporting Goods, Fred Meyer Jewelers, and Mr. Formal. Chuck E. Cheese's also closed their location inside the mall on April 7, 2014. Macy's announced in January 2017 that the Kelso location is one of 68 stores that would be closing. The store closed in March 2017. As of February 2018, there were no tenants open in the food court, and the food court remained vacant until March 2020.

Sportsman's Warehouse opened in the former Emporium store in July 2014. The former Sears store has been demolished, and Regal Cinemas has constructed a new theater on the former Sears site, which replaced the mall's freestanding theater, as well as the Triangle Cinemas in nearby Longview. The new theater opened in January 2015. The mall's management announced in September 2014 that Planet Fitness will be moving into the former Chuck E. Cheese's site with additional space. Planet Fitness held its grand opening in January 2015. Panera Bread built a new, freestanding location which opened in December 2017. A local business called The Coffee Court opened in the mall's food court in March 2020. This is the first food court tenant in over two years.

The mall was purchased by two local businessmen for $20 million in November 2024 and was later renamed to Three Rivers Crossing. The new ownership group plans to renovate the food court and build additional restaurants around the perimeter of the parking lot.

In February, 2026, it was reported that Chick-fil-A is planning a new location at the mall. The restaurant will be located directly south of Target, in the Northeast corner of the current JCPenney parking lot. Full build-out is expected in 2027.

== In popular culture ==
An episode of the Food Network show Food Court Wars was filmed in the mall. The episode titled "Gaufre Gourmet vs. Pressed" originally aired on March 30, 2014. The winner of the contest received one year of free rent in the food court, and Gaufre Gourmet opened for business in April 2014. However, citing a lack of foot traffic, Gaufre Gourmet closed in September 2014, and the owners have since opened a restaurant in Portland, Oregon.
