= Rouse Properties =

Defunct real estate company from New York City

- Type: Subsidiary (2016–2018)
- Industry: Real estate investment trust
- Founded: 2011; 15 years ago
- Founder: General Growth Properties
- Defunct: July 6, 2016; 10 years ago (corporation); August 28, 2018; 8 years ago (brand)
- Fate: Acquired by Brookfield Asset Management
- Successor: GGP, a subsidiary of Brookfield Properties
- Headquarters: New York City
- Products: Shopping malls
- Parent: Brookfield Asset Management (2016–2018)
- Website: rouseproperties.com

Rouse Properties was a real estate investment trust headquartered in New York City. The company owned 35 shopping malls in 22 states encompassing approximately 24.5 million square feet of retail space.

== History ==
In 2011, General Growth Properties announced that it would spin off a portfolio of 30 underperforming, "Class-B" shopping malls as a new company named Rouse Properties. The name was taken from The Rouse Company, which GGP had acquired in 2004. However, Rouse Properties is not a direct successor to The Rouse Company, as Rouse Properties acquired 30 underperforming, "Class-B" properties at its foundation. The portfolio comprised most of GGP's Class B shopping centers (malls located in smaller cities, and second-tier malls in larger cities), allowing GGP to focus on its higher-performing properties. The spin-off was completed on January 12, 2012.

In February 2012, the company acquired Grand Traverse Mall for $66 million.

In January 2013, the company acquired The Mall at Turtle Creek in Jonesboro, Arkansas for $96 million.

In May 2014, the company began a $40 million renovation of NewPark Mall in Newark, California.

In March 2015, the company defaulted a loan secured by Vista Ridge Mall in Lewisville, Texas.

In November 2015, the company acquired The Shoppes at Carlsbad in Carlsbad, California.

In 2016, Brookfield Asset Management, which owned 33% of Rouse Properties, made an unsolicited offer to purchase the rest of the company. A purchase agreement was eventually reached, valuing the company at $2.8 billion. Brookfield's acquisition of Rouse Properties was completed on July 6, 2016.

In 2018, Brookfield also acquired GGP. Ultimately, the Rouse Properties brand was absorbed into Brookfield Properties, and GGP was rebranded as Brookfield Properties Retail Group until January 2026 when Brookfield Corporation rebranded it back to the GGP name.

== Properties ==
- Animas Valley Mall — Farmington, New Mexico
- Bayshore Mall — Eureka, California
- Birchwood Mall — Fort Gratiot Township, Michigan
- The Boulevard Mall — Las Vegas, Nevada
- Cache Valley Mall — Logan, Utah
- The Centre at Salisbury — Salisbury, Maryland
- Chesterfield Towne Center — Chesterfield, Virginia
- Chula Vista Center — Chula Vista, California
- Collin Creek Mall — Plano, Texas (sold to lender in 2014)
- Fig Garden Village — Fresno, California
- Grand Traverse Mall — Traverse City, Michigan
- Greenville Mall — Greenville, North Carolina
- Highland Mall – Austin, Texas (sold to Austin Community College in 2015)
- Independence Mall — Wilmington, North Carolina
- Lakeland Square Mall — Lakeland, Florida
- Lansing Mall — Lansing, Michigan
- The Mall at Barnes Crossing — Tupelo, Mississippi
- The Mall at Sierra Vista — Sierra Vista, Arizona
- The Mall at Turtle Creek — Jonesboro, Arkansas
- Mall St. Vincent — Shreveport, Louisiana
- Monmouth Mall — Eatontown, New Jersey
- Mt. Shasta Mall — Redding, California
- NewPark Mall — Newark, California
- North Plains Mall — Clovis, New Mexico
- Pierre Bossier Mall — Bossier City, Louisiana
- Sikes Senter — Wichita Falls, Texas
- Silver Lake Mall — Coeur D'Alene, Idaho
- Southland Mall — Hayward, California
- The Shoppes at Carlsbad — Carlsbad, California
- The Shoppes at Gateway — Springfield, Oregon
- The Shoppes at Bel Air — Mobile, Alabama
- The Shops at Somerset Square — Glastonbury, Connecticut
- Southland Center — Taylor, Michigan
- Spring Hill Mall — West Dundee, Illinois
- Three Rivers Crossing — Kelso, Washington
- The Vista — Lewisville, Texas
- Valley Hills Mall — Hickory, North Carolina
- Washington Park Mall — Bartlesville, Oklahoma
- West Valley Mall — Tracy, California
- Westwood Mall — Jackson, Michigan
- White Mountain Mall — Rock Springs, Wyoming

== See also ==
- Washington Prime Group, a similar company
