= Idi =

Idi or IDI may refer to:

== People ==
- Idi Amin (1928–2003), President of Uganda and military officer
- Idi b. Abin Naggara, 4th century Jewish Babylonian rabbi
- Idi Othman Guda (1941–2015), Nigerian politician
- Idi Papez, Austrian 1930s pair skater

== Acronym ==
- ICT Development Index, an index published by the United Nations International Telecommunication Union
- Inclusive Development Index, an annual economic index
- Indian Diamond Institute, school in the fields of diamonds, gems and jewellery in India
- Industrial Developments International, a privately held real estate investment trust
- Infectious Diseases Institute, a Ugandan medical organization
- Institut de Droit International, an organization devoted to the study of international law
- Interactive Design Institute, Edinburgh, providing online courses in art and design
- International Diving Institute
- Israel Democracy Institute, a research center dedicated to strengthening Israeli democracy
- Israel Diamond Institute, a non-profit public interest company in Israel

== Other uses ==
- Idi language, a language of Papua New Guinea
- Iði or Idi, a giant in Norse mythology
- IDI, IATA code for Indiana County–Jimmy Stewart Airport, a business service airport in Indiana, Pennsylvania
