= Baybrook Mall =

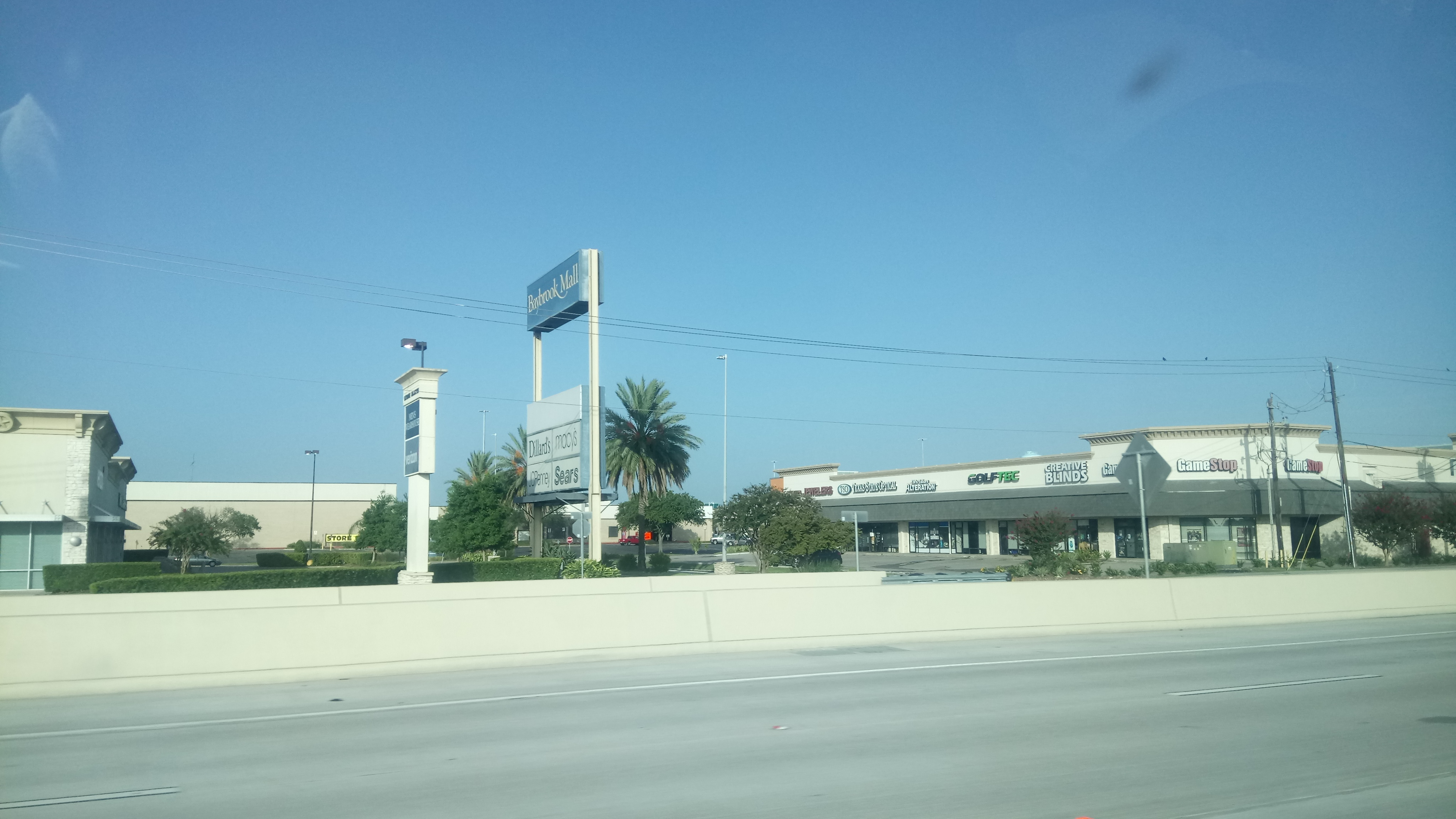
- Location: Clear Lake, Houston, Texas, United States
- Coordinates: 29°32′32″N 95°08′54″W
- Address: 500 Baybrook Mall
- Opened: 1978; 48 years ago
- Developer: Homart Development Company
- Manager: GGP
- Owner: GGP
- Num. of stores: 204
- Num. of anchor tenants: 8 (7 open, 1 vacant)
- Floor area: 1,498,786 sq ft (139,241.8 m^{2}).
- Floors: 1 (2 in the former Forever 21 space, Macy's and former Sears, 3 in Dillard's)
- Website: baybrookmall.com

Baybrook Mall is a shopping mall located near the Clear Lake City area in Houston, Texas; It has a Friendswood mailing address, but it is in the Houston city limits. The mall is located off Interstate 45, and it is also in proximity to Webster and the NASA Johnson Space Center. The anchor stores are Star Cinema Grill, Dave & Buster's, Dillard's, JCPenney, H&M, Macy's, and Living Spaces.

It is located 18 miles (29 km) southeast of downtown Houston at Interstate 45 South and Bay Area Blvd. It has five major anchors and more than 170 stores and restaurants. It has 1,240,000 sq ft (115,000 m^{2}) of retail space.

== History ==
=== Planning and construction ===
Officially announced in April 1977 as the first Houston development of Homart Development Company, Baybrook mall was purposely built smaller than other regional area centers at the time. The Clear Lake area of Houston, along with northern Galveston County, were considered blue collar areas; and it was thought that a large scale shopping center wouldn't succeed in what was a still growing area. For that reason, the mall was not built on a grand scale, and instead as an energy efficient, compact shopping center.

The mall's original lease space would be approximately 625,000 square feet, with hope for a later expansion raising the lease space to almost 1 million square feet. The first anchor tenants were announced to be Montgomery Ward, Sears, and Joske's. The land was graded in July 1977 in preparation of an August 1978 opening.

=== 1978 opening ===
The ribbon cutting for Baybrook Mall was held July 26, 1978. The mall opened with 77 merchants, including: Joske's, Montgomery Ward, Sears, Luby's, Radio Shack, and Zale Corporation.

=== First expansion ===
A major expansion to Baybrook Mall was announced by Homart in March 1983, which added an additional 365,000 square feet of retail space to the mall, including two new anchor stores, Mervyn's, and an additional store to be named later. Macy's announced in February 1984 they were building stores in Texas, and would become the fifth anchor store at Baybrook. The grand opening of the new expansion of 20 retail stores, plus Mervyn's, was held in March 1984, with Gifford Nielsen as master of ceremonies. Macy's followed by opening their new store, and becoming the fifth anchor store, in July 1985. The new Macy's store featured three stories, at least 30 departments, 220,000 square feet of retail space, and became their third store to open in the Houston area.

=== 1980s ===
As the Texas economy and oil prices continued to rise in the early 1980s, the Clear Lake area continued to grow. The area growth was reflected at Baybrook, and many stores expressed interest in leasing space. Other area malls were fully occupied, so Baybrook became a logical alternative. 1984 and 1985 saw an economic downturn in the area, but Baybrook continued to see a consistent increase in sales.

Baybrook Mall became one of the many retail establishments to open on Sundays prior to the repeal of the Texas Blue Law in September 1985, which prohibited many retail items being purchased on Sundays.

Even though it was located in what was considered a safe suburban area, the 80's saw random violence occur at Baybrook Mall, including a kidnapping and the death of a man shot in his truck in the mall parking lot in 1985.

By 1987 the mall was now owned by RREEF and underwent a 2 million dollar renovation. In July 1988 Baybrook Mall averaged a 96%-97% occupancy rate, commanded an average lease rate of $220 per square foot, had more than 160 stores, 1.2 million square feet of retail space, and parking for 5700 cars. With more than 500,000 people in its trade area, Baybrook's average shopper visited the mall more than 3 times per month, and spent an average of $84 each visit. These sales figures resulted in a 10% increase in revenue from the previous year. Retailers referred to Baybrook as "an A plus mall".

The holiday shopping season of 1988 saw the City of Galveston asking their residents to shop at home at their own Galvez Mall, rather than taking their shopping dollars to Baybrook Mall. Baybrook was 27 miles away from Galveston's mall, yet was considered such an economic threat that Galveston partnered with area merchants and the local paper to promote an ad campaign to shop local.

In February 1989 Baybrook Mall was 96% occupied, making it the mall with the second highest percentage of occupied space in the Houston area.

=== 1990s ===
1990 saw a continued increase in revenue, as sales were reported to be an increase of 22% from the same period of the previous year.

Baybrook underwent what was described as a major proactive renovation in 1994. The revamping of the mall included new rotundas at each mall entrance, rotundas at the mall entrances of each anchor store, redesigned shopping concourses, continuous vaulted skylights, and additional rest areas. The $8 million project also replaced the old terrazzo and quarry flooring with a more elegant marble surface, added a new center court fountain, and also added a brightly colored facade at the main external mall entrance. New amenities included additional ATM machines, stroller rental, new directories, and more signage. All construction work was done at night as to lessen the inconvenience to customers, and the project was completed in 10 months. The celebratory ribbon cutting was held in November 1994.

In 1999 Baybrook was sold to GGP Inc., which merged with Brookfield Property Partners in 2018, and continues to be Baybrook's owner.

=== 2000's ===
A botched robbery incident in August 2000 resulted in a murder at the Dillard's entrance. A woman was entering Dillard's when approached by the suspect attempting to grab her purse. After a struggle, the woman was shot in the neck. The suspect fled, and the woman collapsed in the Dillard's doorway and later died.

After 30 years at Baybrook, original tenant Luby's lease expired, and they left the mall to relocate to a new location across the Gulf Freeway in 2008.

As of 2007, with the name change from Foley's to Macy's through the acquisition of Foley's parent company, The May Department Stores Company, Macy's returned to the mall. Previously, in 1987, Dillard's (on the south side) and Macy's (on the north side) faced off against each other at Baybrook Mall. Because of acquisitions and name changes, 20 years later Dillard's held the north side anchor, and Macy's became the south anchor.

=== Later Years: Lifestyle Expansion and Power Center ===
In March 2014 Baybrook was at almost 100% leasing capacity, and considered the premiere shopping destination for the southeast quadrant of Houston. At this time it was announced Baybrook was planning a massive expansion. The expansion would include a new outdoor Lifestyle center, and retail Power Center, adding a combined additional 500,000 square feet to the mall, including more than 30 retail stores and 10 restaurants. This is in part to help compete with the Tanger Outlet Mall in Texas City and the Pearland Town Center.

In November 2015, Baybrook Mall completed the first part of its two-phase expansion, the 285,000 square foot Lifestyle Center. The Lifestyle expansion included a green space, stage, 22' x 12' digital screen, retail stores, restaurants, and entertainment venues. New tenants included Dave & Buster's, Star Cinema Grill, Bar Louie, Z Gallerie, Kendra Scott, Yard House, Perry's Steakhouse, Zara (retailer), Arhaus, Maggiano's Little Italy and many other establishments. The expansion remarked a return of a theater to Baybrook, as Star Cinema grill constructed a 42,000 square ft flagship location; and Baybrook had not had a theater since General Cinema closed their location in 1998.

The second phase 270,000 sq. ft. Power Center opened in November 2016. The power center, constructed adjacent to the lifestyle expansion, features Dick's Sporting Goods (one of five throughout Greater Houston) as one of the anchor tenants. Other retailers in the power center included The Container Store and Total Wine & More, which would be their first locations in the southeast side of Houston. The combined expansion has made it the second largest mall in the Houston area, after The Galleria.

== Anchor stores ==
=== Original Joske's location ===
In April 1987, Dillard's purchased the Joske's chain of stores. This change of ownership resulted in all Joske's stores being renamed with the Dillard's name. Therefore, the Joske's original anchor store at Baybrook Mall was the first anchor at the mall to undergo a name change when it became Dillard's in 1987. Baybrook Mall advertising was using the Dillard's name, instead of Joske's, as of August 1987.

Ten years later, in 1997, this location became the Dillard's store for men and home departments only when Dillard's moved the women's and children's departments to the recently acquired former Macy's location. In 2004 Dillard's renovated and expanded their store in the original Macy's building. Because of the expansion they were able to consolidate their two Baybrook stores into the now larger location, and vacate their smaller store which had served as the men's and home store.

During this time, Foley's announced they would move to the location Dillard's had just vacated. Foley's completely renovated the building, and added an additional 100,000 square feet of retail space. The renovation and expansion of the building was completed in nine months. The new store opened November 2004.

Foley's owner, May Company, sold all of their stores to Federated Stores, and Federated changed Foley's name to the Macy's nameplate. The Macy's name change took effect in 2006, and marked the return of Macy's to Baybrook.

=== Original Macy's location ===
To focus on their Texas locations in Houston, Dallas and San Antonio, Macy's sold their three suburban Houston stores to Dillard's in March 1997. This change resulted in Baybrook having two Dillard's stores, one in the Joske's building, and one in the Macy's building. The Macy's location became the Dillard's store for women's and children's departments.

In 2004 Dillard's renovated and expanded the former Macy's location, from 218,000 square feet to 330,000 square feet. With the greatly expanded store, they consolidated their two Baybrook locations into one.

=== Original Montgomery Ward location ===
After 128 years in business, Montgomery Ward announced in December 2000 they were filing for bankruptcy, and closing all stores. The Baybrook location closed in early 2001.

After much speculation, Foley's opened a store at Baybrook Mall in the space vacated by Ward's. Foley's moved in to the vacated anchor spot in November 2001.

Upon Foley's move to the renovated original Joske's building in 2004, J.C. Penney announced they would open a store at Baybrook. J.C. Penney chose to demolish the original two-story Ward's building and build a new 93,000 square foot one-story store in its place. Penney's store at Baybrook opened November 2005.

=== Mervyn's ===
Mervyn's 80,000 square foot anchor store opened in 1984 as part of the new mall expansion. It ceased operations at the end of 2005 when Mervyn's parent company closed 62 underperforming stores, 28 of them in Texas, and vacated the Houston market.

The store sat empty for four years, until it was renovated for Forever 21. Forever 21 previously had a 7000 square foot space at Baybrook, and moved to the former Mervyn's building in 2010.

Anchor Forever 21 closed in 2025, following their bankruptcy.

=== Original Sears location ===
In 2015, Sears Holdings spun off 235 of its properties, including the Sears at Baybrook Mall, into Seritage Growth Properties. On June 22, 2017, Sears announced that its Baybrook store would be closing, along with one other Greater Houston store, as part of a plan to close 20 stores nationwide. The Baybrook store, which was an original anchor from 1978, closed in September 2017.

In 2024, the space formerly occupied by Sears was rebuilt, and in its place, a Living Spaces was opened.
