= Blue Water Area Transit =

Transit system

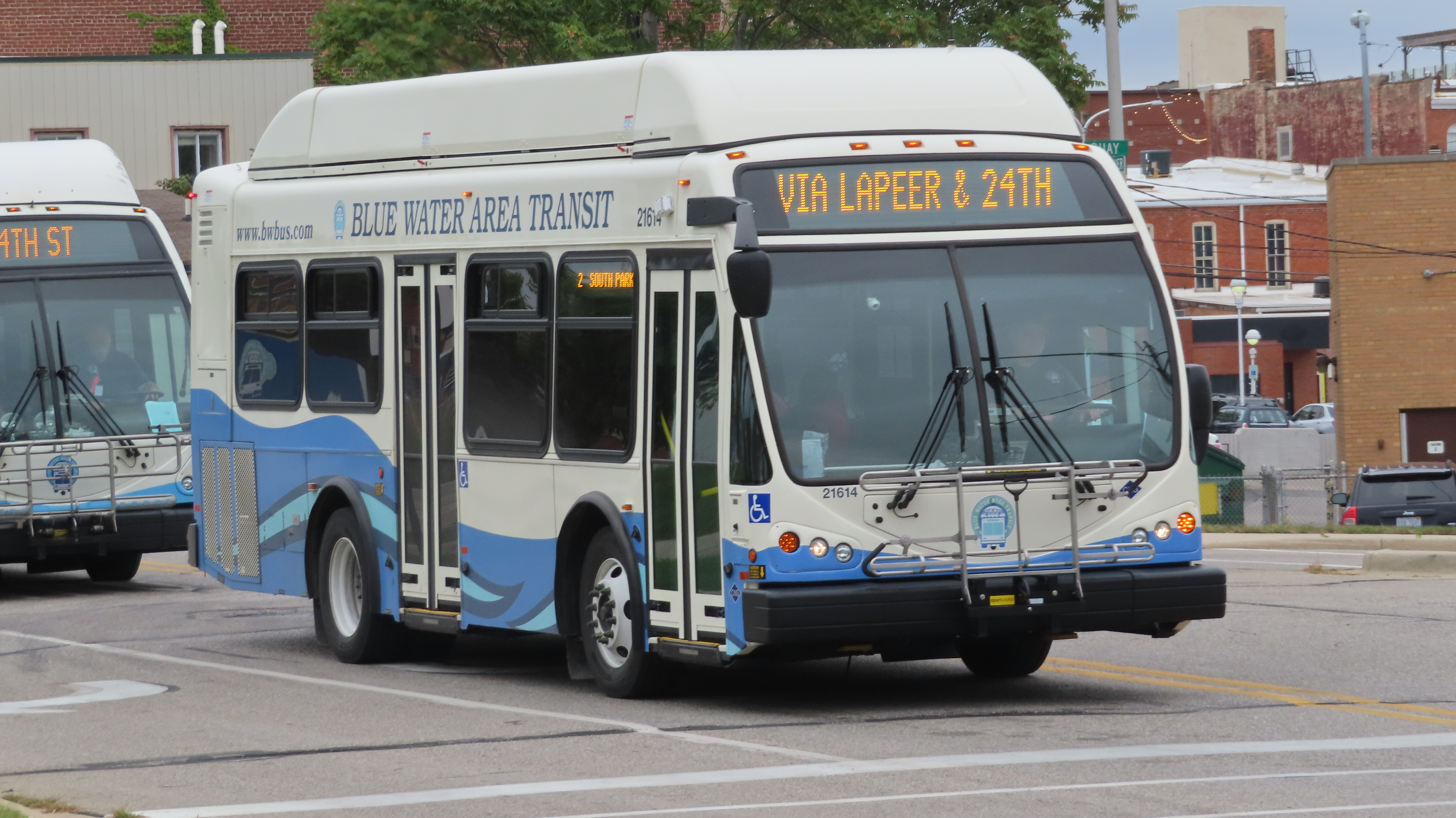
- BWAT bus in downtown Port Huron
- Founded: 1976
- Headquarters: 2021 Lapeer Avenue
- Locale: Port Huron, Michigan
- Service area: St. Clair County, Michigan
- Service type: bus service, paratransit
- Routes: 9
- Daily ridership: 4,400 (weekdays, Q2 2025)
- Annual ridership: 1,037,500 (2024)
- Fuel type: CNG
- Website: bwbus.com

Blue Water Area Transit (BWAT) is the public transit operator serving Port Huron, Michigan and surrounding St. Clair County. Operated by the Blue Water Area Transportation Commission (BWATC), the BWAT system includes fixed-route buses in the Port Huron area, plus commuter routes (connecting the city to SMART in Metro Detroit) and paratransit services. In 2024, the system had a ridership of 1,037,500, or about 4,400 per weekday.

== History ==
Following the cessation of private buses in Port Huron in 1968, BWAT commenced operations in 1976, with the assistance of neighboring SEMTA.

BWAT began operating buses powered by compressed natural gas in 1996, and soon held the largest alternative-fuel transit fleet in Michigan. The system's current fleet consists almost entirely of CNG-powered buses.

December 2015 saw the opening of the Blue Water Transit Bus Center in downtown Port Huron, which serves as the system's main hub. The $9.8 million facility includes a small store, as well as underground boilers to keep the sidewalks clear of snow and ice in the winter.

In 2021, BWAT acquired two Proterra ZX5 battery-electric buses, becoming the first Michigan transit agency since the 1970s to operate electric buses.

== Routes ==
BWAT operates eleven fixed bus routes, using a fleet consisting mostly of Gillig Low Floor, ElDorado Axess, and ElDorado E-Z Rider buses.

=== Local routes ===
These routes operate from 6am-11pm Monday-Friday and 7:45am-11pm on Saturdays. Numbered routes begin and end at the Blue Water Transit Bus Center downtown.

- 1 – Electric Ave
- 2 – 24th Street
- 3 – Sams Club transfer
- 4 – Holland
- 5 – Pine Grove/ Mall
- 6 – Home Depot
- 9 – Beard/Dove
- Shopper Shuttle (circulator through Fort Gratiot Township, serving Birchwood Mall and other retail stores)
- Blue Water Trolley (downtown tourist trolley circulator, runs June–September)

=== Regional routes ===
These operate only on weekdays, connecting Port Huron to Chesterfield Township in Macomb County, where connections are available to SMART's route 560 and Gratiot FAST.

- I-94 - express from Port Huron to Chesterfield, with intermediate stops at park-and-ride lots in Marysville and Casco; two trips each way in the morning, one trip each way in the evening.
- M-29 - local service via Marysville, St. Clair, Marine City, Algonac, and New Baltimore; one trip each way in morning, and another in the evening.

== Cost ==
- Adult fare - $.80
- Children 17 and under - $.65
- Senior/disabled - $.40
- Under 5 – free
