= Apache Mall =

Coordinates: 44.004255°N 92.479563°W

- Location: Rochester, Minnesota
- Address: 1201 Twelfth Street Southwest
- Opened: October 16, 1969; 57 years ago
- Developer: Apache Corporation
- Manager: GGP
- Owner: GGP
- Architect: Thorsen & Thorshov
- Num. of stores: 114
- Num. of anchor tenants: 5 (4 open, 1 under construction)
- Floor area: 1,750,000
- Floors: 1 (2 in Macy's, Scheels, former Herberger's)
- Parking: 3,700
- Public transit: RPT
- Website: www.apachemall.com

Apache Mall is a shopping mall in Rochester, Minnesota, United States. Apache Mall is owned and managed by GGP, a subsidiary of Brookfield Properties. The mall's anchor stores are Scheels All Sports, Barnes & Noble, Macy's, and JCPenney. Shoe Dept Encore, Orangetheory Fitness, and Men's Wearhouse are junior anchors. There is 1 anchor store that is set to become a Sky Zone trampoline park. It is currently under construction. This anchor space was formerly Herberger's.

== History ==
Apache Mall opened on October 16, 1969, on a 99-acre plot of former farmland purchased from George Baihly. The original anchors were JCPenney and Montgomery Ward. By the mid-1960s, southwest Rochester had grown significantly, with the extension of U.S. Route 52 past U.S. Route 14 (which had been the highway's termination point for a few years). The extension of the freeway helped extend the city's "belt-line" in some respects with a push south. Suburban development had taken hold by this point and over the next twenty-five years, the area would grow quite a bit. The construction of the mall was a tipping point of moving commerce from downtown Rochester in a changing retail landscape.

Dayton-Hudson Corporation (later Target Corporation) moved the local branch of their Dayton's department store chain to a newly constructed 150,000 sq. ft. store at Apache Mall, from its former downtown Rochester, Minnesota location, in 1972. At that time Apache Mall was the third-largest shopping center in Minnesota. Sears opened a new store at the mall in 1991. In 2001, Montgomery Ward closed its doors and was later replaced by Herberger's. In that same year, the Dayton's location at Apache Mall would eventually take on the Marshall Field's nameplate after acquiring the store chain in a merger; and would ultimately be rebranded as Macy's after the selling of Marshall Field's to Federated Stores.

In 2014, the mall's Sears store was closed. However, shortly after the Sears was shut down, plans for a Scheels All Sports were announced, as well as an expansion of the building. Scheels opened in 2015. On April 18, 2018, it was announced that Herberger's would be closing as parent company The Bon-Ton Stores was going out of business. The store closed on August 29, 2018.

In November, 2025, it was announced that Sky Zone, a trampoline park, would be opening in the former Herberger's department store. The store is currently under construction and expected to open in mid-late 2026.
