= Visalia Mall =

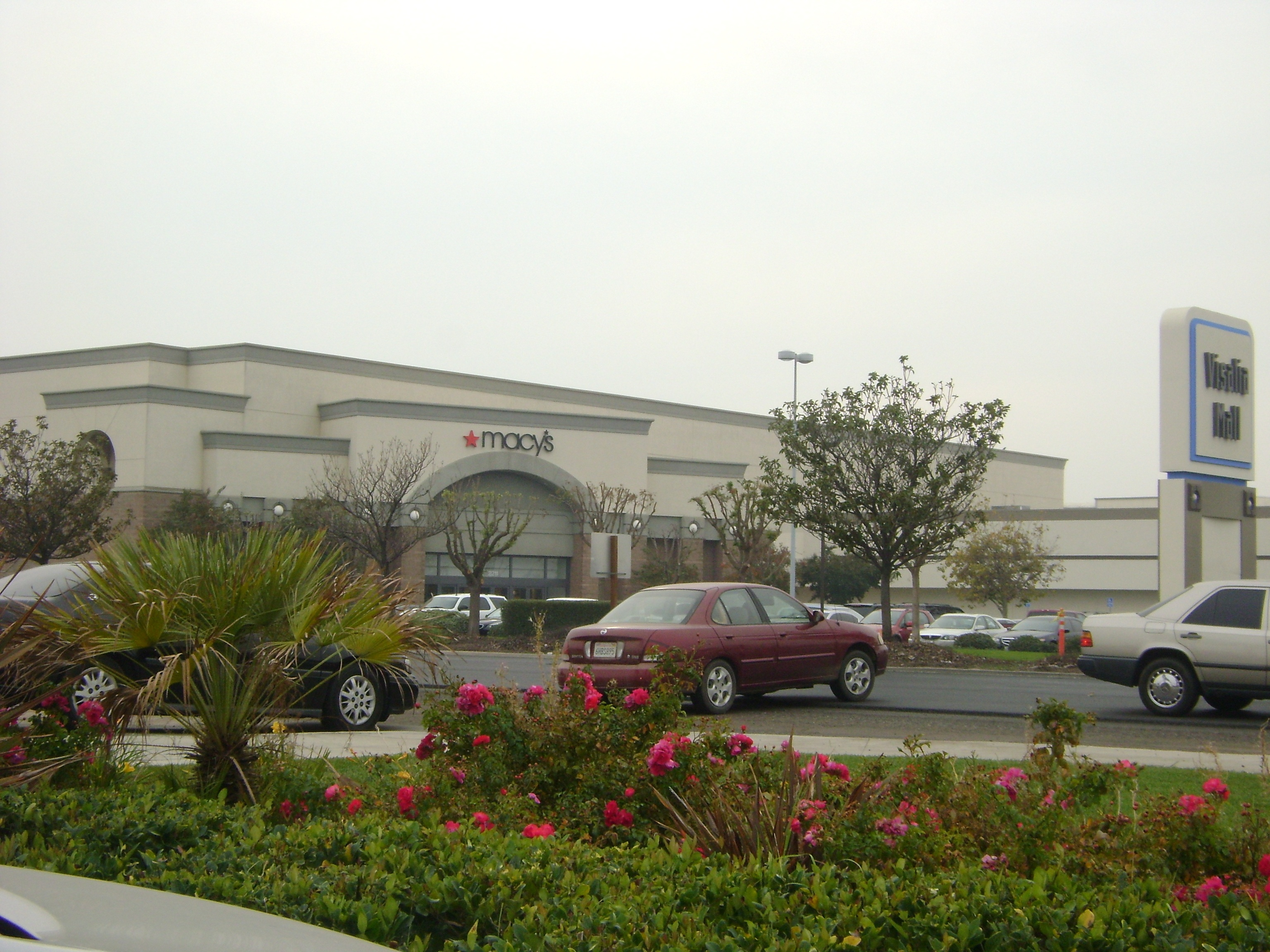
- View from Kohl's shopping center parking lot
- Location: Visalia, California
- Address: 2031 South Mooney Boulevard
- Opened: 1964; 62 years ago
- Developer: Desmond Mactavish
- Manager: GGP
- Owner: GGP
- Num. of stores: 75
- Num. of anchor tenants: 2
- Floor area: 435,376 sq ft (40,448 m^{2})
- Floors: 1 (2 in Macy's, 3 in Parking Garage)
- Parking: 2,200 spaces
- Website: visaliamall.com

Visalia Mall is an enclosed shopping mall in Visalia, California anchored by Macy's and JCPenney.

== History ==
Visalia Mall was the first enclosed shopping mall in California when it opened in 1964. In September 1997, the mall finished its $30 million renovation. This added a 450-seat food court, an additional 38,000 sq ft (3,500 m^{2}) of space with a new anchor store Gottschalks, and a 3-story parking garage. The mall was acquired in 1988 by Newman Brettin Properties. In 1997 it was purchased by JP Realty Inc. of Salt Lake City. Macy's opened at the mall in 2009 in the former Gottschalks space which closed early that year. In 2018, Macy's added a Backstage discount store in its location.
