= Governor's Square =

Shopping mall in Tallahassee, Florida, U.S.

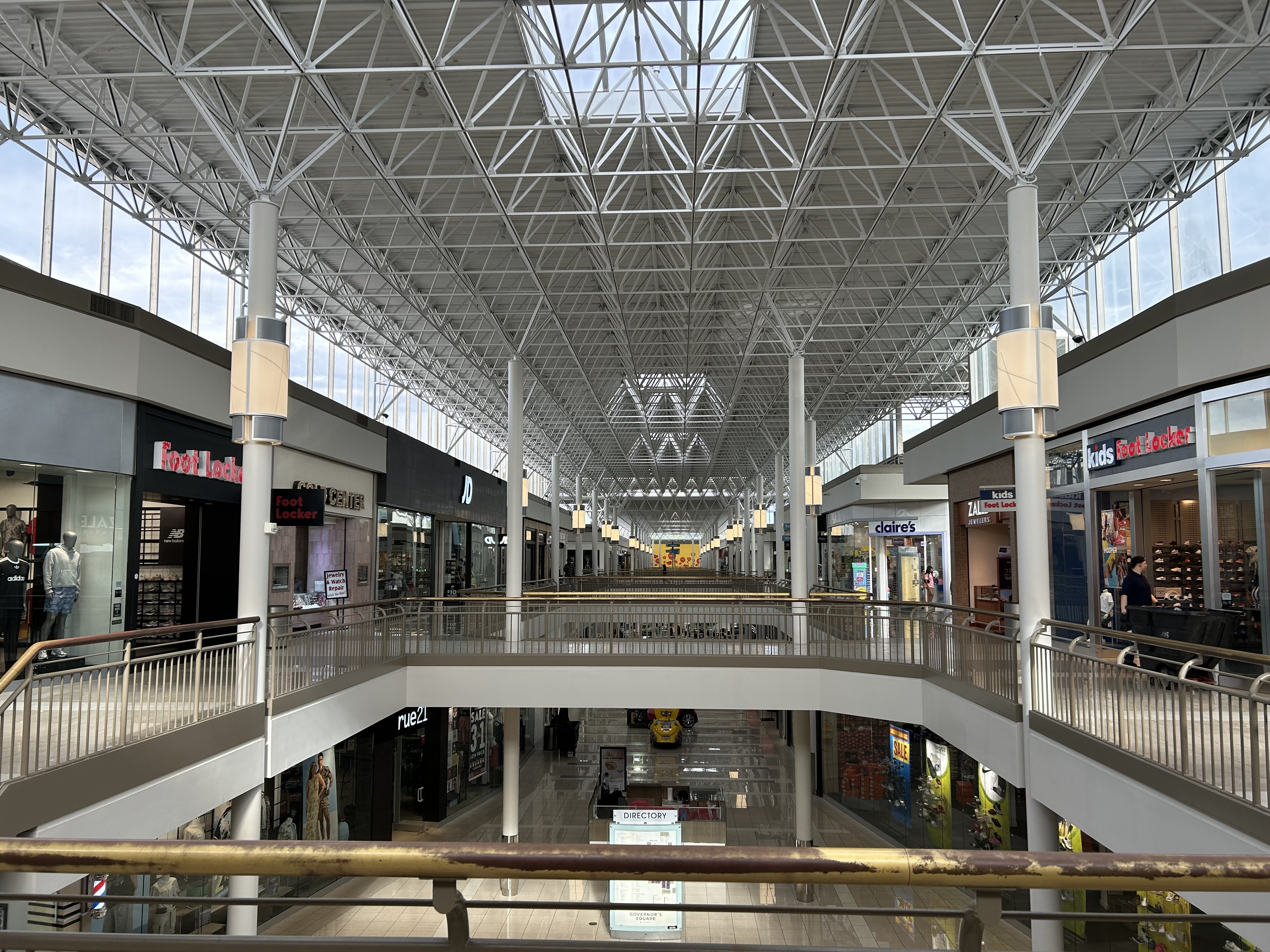
- Image of the interior of the mall from the second floor on May 29, 2025
- Location: Tallahassee, Florida, United States
- Coordinates: 30.436937°N 84.253561°W
- Opened: August 16, 1979; 47 years ago
- Developer: The Rouse Company
- Manager: GGP
- Owner: GGP
- Num. of stores: 116
- Num. of anchor tenants: 4 (2 open, 1 vacant, 1 under construction)
- Floor area: 1,032,342 square feet (95,907.7 m^{2})
- Floors: 2 (3 in Dillard's)
- Parking: 5,200 free on-site spaces (surface and garage)
- Website: governorssquare.com

Governor's Square is a super-regional shopping mall located on Apalachee Parkway in Tallahassee, Florida. Its two-level design was a first for northern Florida when it opened in 1979, and was for many years the newer of two enclosed malls in the Tallahassee area, the other being The Centre of Tallahassee, formerly the Tallahassee Mall. The anchor stores are currently JCPenney and Dillard's. The former Macy’s anchor space is currently under construction to become a Tilt Studio Arcade. There is one vacant anchor space last occupied by Sears.

Built into a hillside, the mall can be entered either on the first or second level, depending on where a particular entrance is located. The mall's original anchor stores were J. C. Penney, Sears, and Maas Brothers. Maas Brothers was converted to Burdines in 1991. In March 2005, the Burdines store was converted to a Macy's.

== History ==
A 1993 expansion included an additional wing, as well as Dillard's becoming the fourth anchor.

In 2015, Governor's Square Mall received a $10 million renovation.

On December 28, 2018, Sears announced that it would be closing its Governor's Square anchor store as part of a plan to close 80 stores nationwide. The store closed in March 2019. During the COVID-19 pandemic, the vacant store served as a Florida Department of Health monoclonal antibody treatment site.

On January 18, 2024, it was announced that Macy's would be closing as part of a plan to close 5 stores nationwide. The store closed permanently on March 26, 2024.

In 2025, it was announced that Tilt Studio would open an arcade at the mall inside the former Macy’s anchor space. Construction began in 2026 and Tilt Studio is expected to open in 2027.

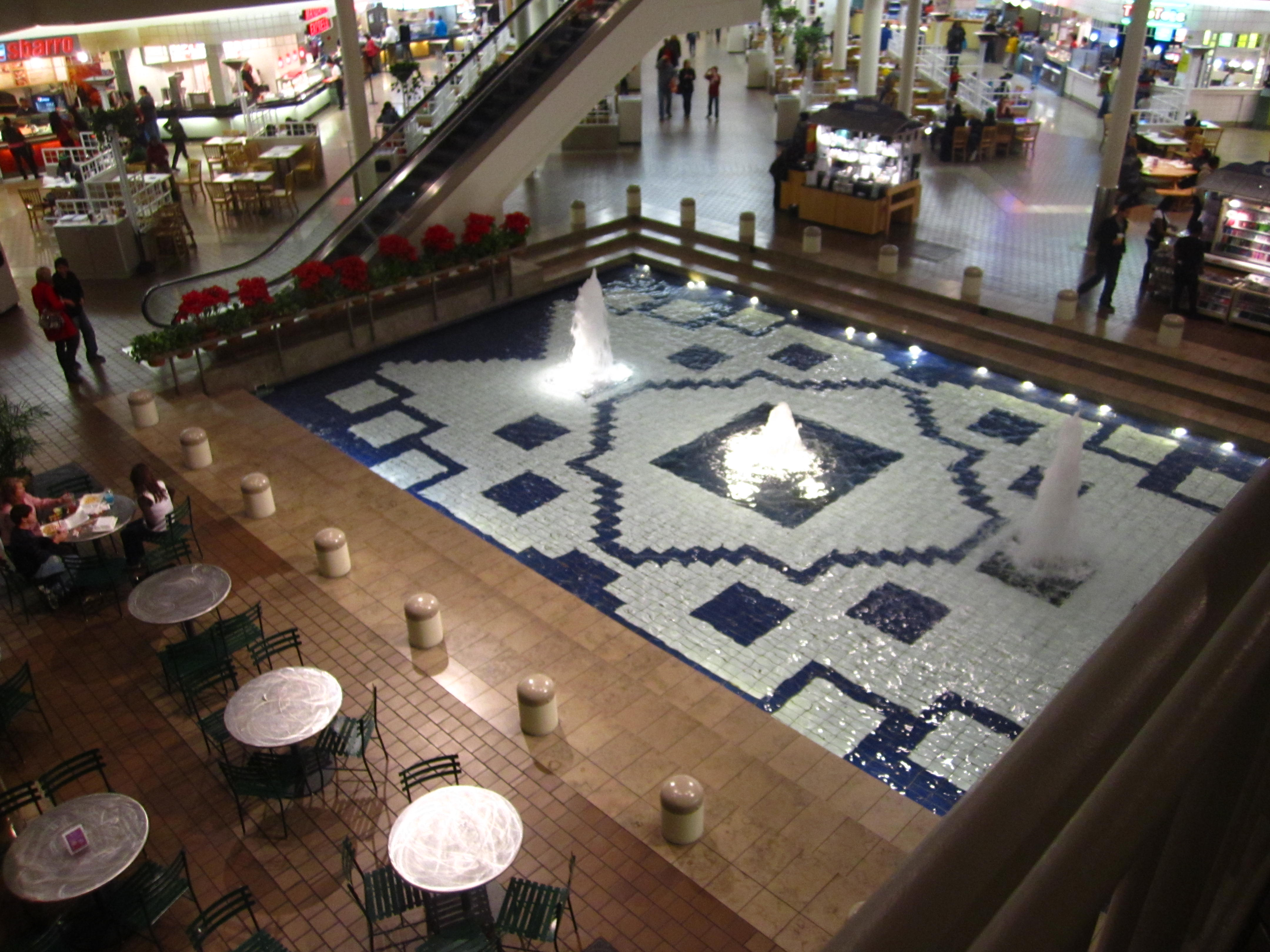
The center court of Governor's Square in 2011.

The mall lies within a relatively affluent trade area less than two miles (3 km) east of downtown.
