= Mall St. Vincent =

Coordinates: 32.47732°N 93.75268°W

- Location: Shreveport, Louisiana, United States
- Opened: February 2, 1977; 49 years ago
- Developer: General Growth Properties
- Manager: Summit Properties USA
- Owner: Summit Properties USA
- Num. of stores: 55
- Num. of anchor tenants: 2 (1 open, 1 under construction)
- Floor area: 545,000 square feet (50,600 m^{2})
- Floors: 1 (2 in Dillard's)
- Website: http://www.mallstvincent.com/

Mall St. Vincent is an enclosed shopping mall located off Interstate 49 at 1133 St. Vincent Avenue in Shreveport, Louisiana, United States. The mall's main anchor store is Dillard's. The Sears anchor store closed in 2018 as a result of the chain filing for Chapter 11 bankruptcy protection. The former Sears anchor space is currently under renovation into a medical facility that will be operated by Louisiana State University (LSU) Health.

== History ==
The mall opened on February 2, 1977, and was developed by General Growth Properties (now known as GGP). The mall was constructed on the 100-acre site of the original St. Vincent's Academy, a Catholic girls' school built by the Daughters of the Cross, from which it gets its name from.

In 2014, the city government voted for a tax-payer funded proposal of $16.5 million US into Mall St Vincent, but the long-term fate of the retail mall remains in doubt.

An outdoor fountain was included in the remodeling project was done in 2014. However, by 2017, the fountain was already crumbling and without water, with the plants surrounding the structure having already died.

In 2017, Grimaldi's Pizzeria and Gymboree closed their Mall St. Vincent operations; a local news article noted that online shopping and changing consumer habits have affected shopping malls; with as many as one in four closing within the next five years.

On June 6, 2018, it was announced that Sears would be closing in September 2018, as a result of the chain filing for Chapter 11 bankruptcy protection.

After declaring bankruptcy, New York & Company closed all stores including its Mall St. Vincent storefront in 2020.

In 2026, the LSU Health Sciences Foundation purchased the former Sears building for $3.5 million to convert it into a 181,000-square-foot (16,800 m^{2}) biomedical research facility. On February 27, 2026, the Louisiana State University Board of Supervisors voted to give the "next level of approval" to the project.
