= White Mountain Mall =

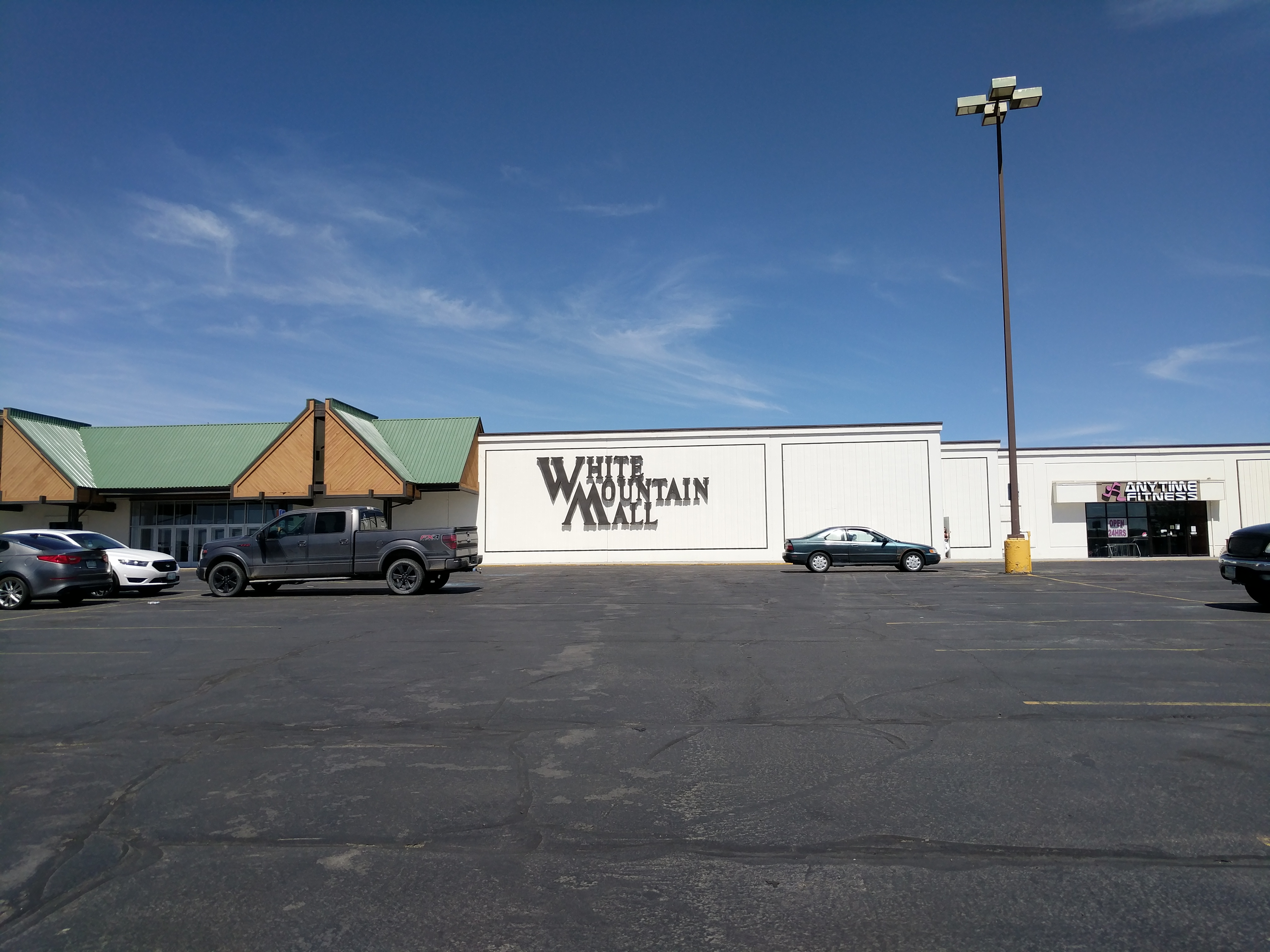
- White Mountain Mall
- Location: Rock Springs, Wyoming, United States
- Coordinates: 41°34′53″N 109°15′50″W
- Opened: 1978; 48 years ago
- Developer: Price Development Corporation
- Manager: Alturas Capital Partners
- Owner: Alturas Capital Partners
- Architect: Don Johnson
- Num. of stores: 40
- Num. of anchor tenants: 8
- Floor area: 330,000 sq ft
- Floors: 1
- Public transit: STAR Transit
- Website: http://www.whitemountainmall.com

White Mountain Mall is a shopping mall located in Rock Springs, Wyoming owned and is managed by Alturas Capital Partners. It is one of only three enclosed malls in the entire state of Wyoming.

The mall is located near Interstate 80/U.S. Route 30/191, and features over 40 stores. The anchor stores are Star Stadium 11 + ARQ, Murdoch's Ranch & Home Supply, Ross Dress for Less, Shoe Dept. Encore, TJ Maxx, Petco, and Dunham's Sports.

== History ==
=== Planning and Opening ===
Plans for White Mountain Mall were first announced by Price Development Corporation of Salt Lake City in 1977, with Charles Petersen, also of Salt Lake City serving as architect. The mall was set to be 270,000 square feet (25,000 m^{2}), while the cost of the development would be $10 million, and have an anticipated opening date of December 1977. JCPenney, Ernst Home Center, and Woolworth would serve as the malls anchors.

White Mountain Mall was developed by Price Development Corporation and opened in 1978. It was the first enclosed shopping mall in the state of Wyoming. The mall opened with the aforementioned tenants, as well as the state of Wyoming’s first Herberger's.

Ernst's space was later a Walmart, and then Flaming Gorge Harley-Davidson. Now it is a Ross Dress for Less

=== 2010s ===
In September 2011, the mall flooded due to a water pipe bursting. The mall closed until the pipe burst was fixed.

In January 2016, JCPenney announced its store will be closing its doors in Spring 2016. Both TJ Maxx and Petco now occupy the space the former JCPenney.

In April 2018, it was announced that Herberger's would also be closing, as parent company The Bon-Ton Stores was going out of business. The store closed on August 29, 2018.

=== 2020s ===
In June 2021, work started on the former Herberger's space to be converted into a Dunham’s Sports store. It opened in October 2021, being its first location in the state of Wyoming.

In December 2023, Brookfield Properties sold the mall to Idaho based Alturas Capital Partners.

In May 2025, the mall’s Joann Fabrics permanently closed due to the company going bankrupt.
