= Birchwood Mall =

Shopping mall in Fort Gratiot Township, Michigan

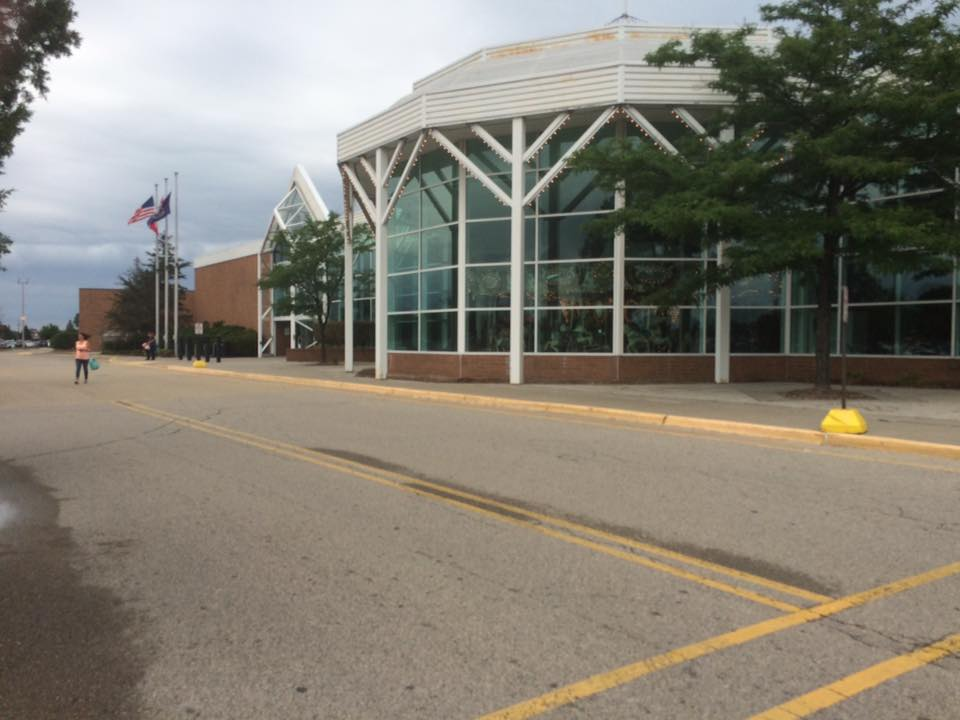
- The mall's southern entrance in 2018
- Location: Fort Gratiot Township, Michigan, United States
- Coordinates: 43.0363°N 82.4535°W
- Opened: October 10, 1990; 36 years ago
- Developer: General Growth Properties
- Manager: Kohan Retail Investment Group; Summit Properties USA
- Owner: Kohan Retail Investment Group; Summit Properties USA
- Num. of stores: 45+
- Num. of anchor tenants: 5 (4 open, 1 vacant)
- Floor area: 729,407 sq ft (67,764.1 m^{2})
- Floors: 1 (staff mezzanine in Target)
- Public transit: BWAT
- Website: birchwoodmall.com

Birchwood Mall is an enclosed shopping mall located in Fort Gratiot Township, outside the city of Port Huron, Michigan, United States. The mall features more than 100 stores and a food court. The mall's anchor stores are CubeSmart, Dunham's Sports, JCPenney, and Target. Other major tenants include Planet Fitness and AMC Birchwood 10. There is one vacant anchor store that was once Sears. The mall is located on 24th Avenue (M-25), north of Interstate 69 (I-69) and I-94.

== History ==
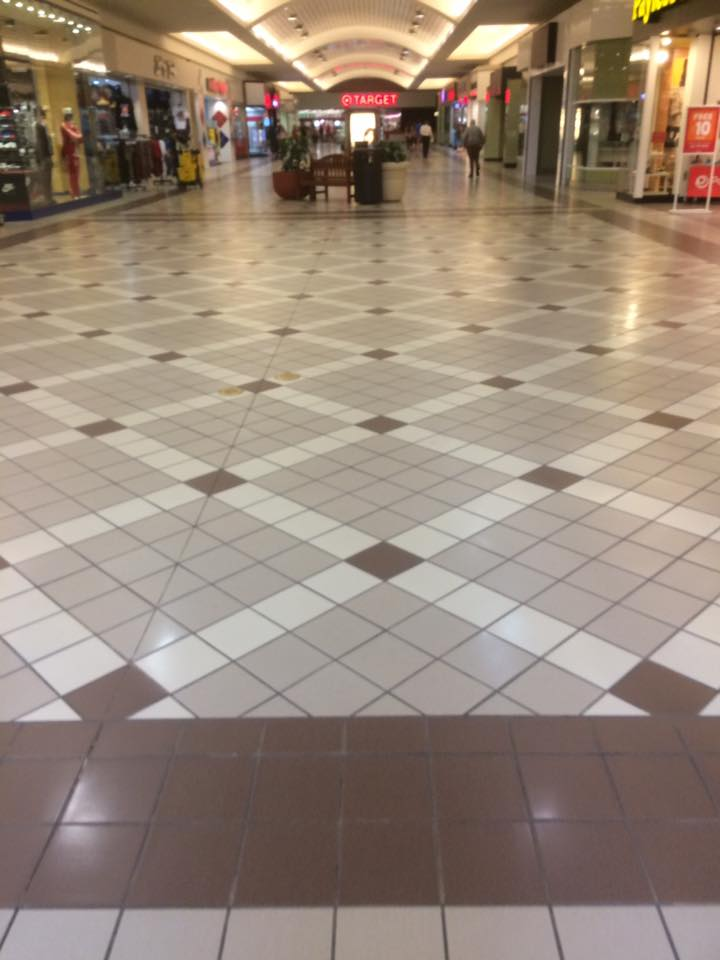
The Target wing of the mall in 2018

Birchwood Mall opened in April 1991, with Target, Sears, JCPenney, and Wisconsin-based department store chain Prange's as its anchor stores. Upon opening, the mall attracted Canadian shoppers, who crossed over from Sarnia, Ontario on the Blue Water Bridge.

The Prange's chain was acquired by Younkers in 1992, and all Prange's stores were re-branded. Three years later, Detroit-based Hudson's announced that it would add a store to the mall, and this store opened in 1997. Old Navy was also added in the Younkers wing in the late 1990s, followed by Dunham's Sports. Chuck E. Cheese's was added in 2004 and closed in 2014.

On February 2, 1999, Lowe's Home Improvement opened next to the mall.

In 2001, Hudson's changed its name to that of its Chicago-based sister nameplate Marshall Field's. On September 9, 2006, Marshall Field's was one of several nameplates to be converted to the Macy's name. Old Navy closed in late 2007. The space was later occupied by Rainbow Shops and is now Planet Fitness.

In January 2013, the Younkers store changed its name again, this time becoming Carson's.

On January 13, 2016, it was announced that one of its anchor stores, Sears, was planning to close its doors after being at the Birchwood Mall since its opening in April 1991. The store closed in March 2016. There are no current plans for that particular retail space.

In March 2016, Carmike Cinemas announced closure of the movie theater for remodeling. The remodeling would last two weeks. Upon first opening, the mall had neon lighting in some archways in the mall. Most of it was later removed or turned off.

On July 8, 2016, a Five Below went in the former Chuck E. Cheese's.

On January 3, 2018, it was announced that Macy's would also be closing as part of a plan to close 11 stores nationwide. The store closed in March 2018.

On April 19, 2018, Carson's parent company Bon-Ton announced it was unable to find a buyer and was going out of business. The store closed on August 29, 2018. After the closure of Carson's, the mall only has 2 of its 5 anchor stores occupied, JCPenney and Target. However, Dunham's Sports moved into the former Carson's space in September 2020.

In February 2021, the mall was sold to the Kohan Retail Investment Group for $5.6 million. Later in the year, a CubeSmart Self Storage opened in the former Macy's.
