= Grand Teton Mall =

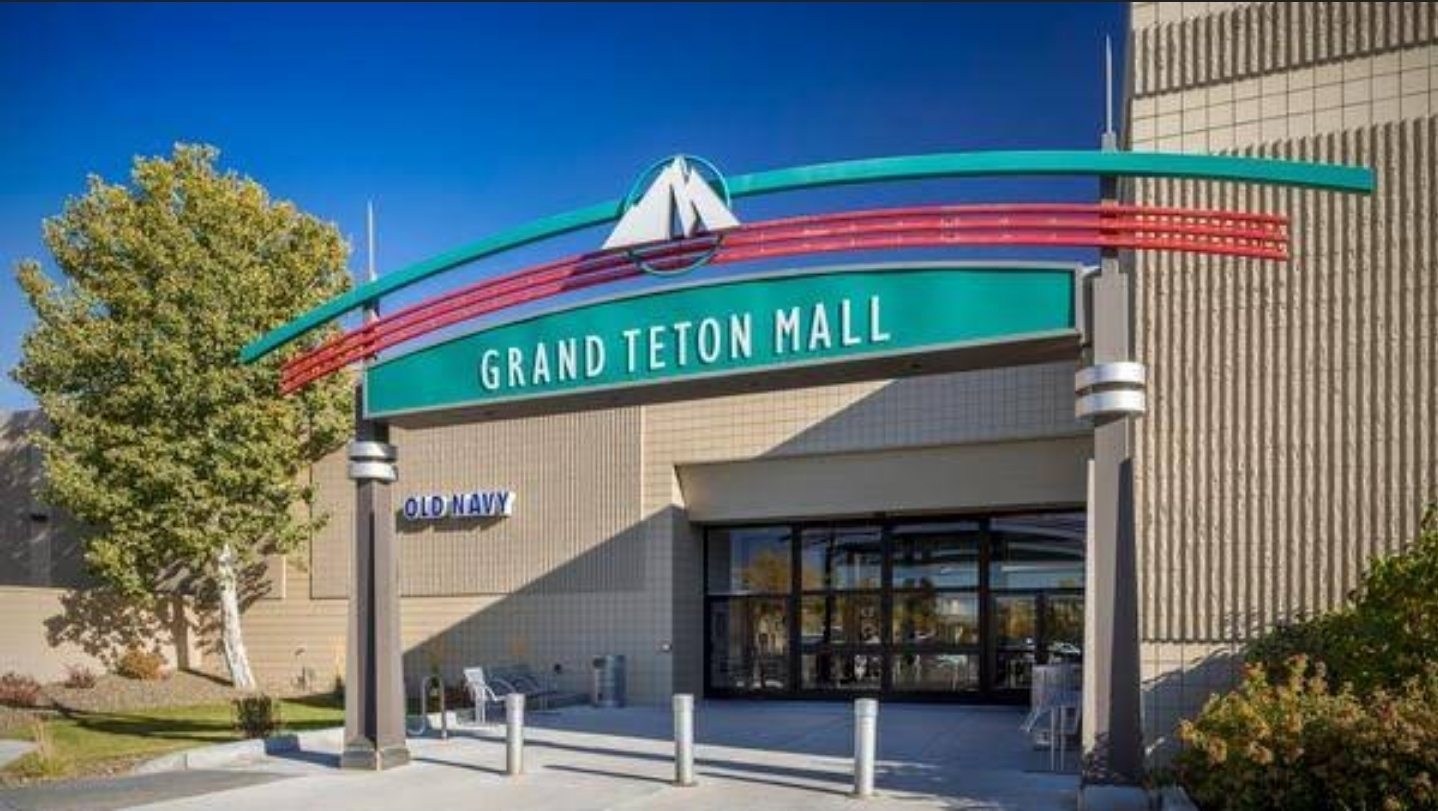
- The south entrance to the Grand Teton Mall.
- Location: Idaho Falls, Idaho
- Coordinates: 43.4798°N 111.9881°W
- Address: 2300 E 17th St
- Opened: August 1, 1984
- Manager: GGP
- Owner: GGP
- Num. of anchor tenants: 4
- Floor area: 644,000 square feet (59,800 m^{2})
- Floors: 1 (2 in Dillard's)
- Parking: 2,900 spaces
- Website: www.grandtetonmall.com

The Grand Teton Mall is a shopping mall located in Idaho Falls, Idaho, that opened in 1984. The anchor tenants are Alturas Preparatory Academy, Dick's Sporting Goods, Dillard's, and JCPenney.

== History ==
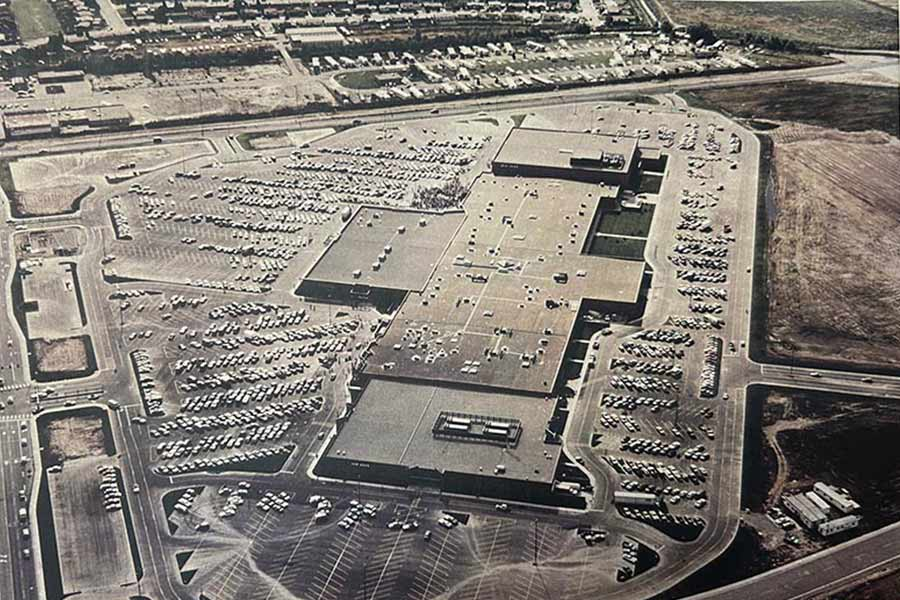
The Grand Teton Mall on August 1, 1984

Grand Teton Mall opened in 1984 with The Bon Marché, JCPenney, and ZCMI. A Sears store was added a short time after, relocating from the now-defunct Country Club Shopping Center.

In 2001, ZCMI was rebranded as Dillard's following the chain's acquisition of four stores in Idaho and Utah. In 2005, a remodel of the mall added a new mall entrance and a Barnes & Noble store which relocated from a nearby shopping center. In 2005, The Bon Marché was rebranded as Macy's.

On November 8, 2018, it was announced that Sears would be closing as part of a plan to close 40 stores nationwide. The store closed on January 20, 2019.

On January 5, 2021, it was announced that Macy's would be closing as part of a plan to close 46 stores nationwide. It closed in March 2021. In 2021, a prep school was announced to be occupying the space of the former Sears, with construction starting soon after. The new school, Alturas Preparatory Academy, opened in August 2021. On February 3, 2022, Dick's Sporting Goods announced it would be occupying the former Macy's, which would involve the demolition and replacement of the entrances. It opened on August 12, 2022.
