= Sooner Mall =

Shopping mall in Norman, Oklahoma, U.S.

- Location: Norman, Oklahoma, United States
- Coordinates: 35°13′12″N 97°29′27″W
- Address: 3301 W Main St, Norman, OK 73072
- Opened: 1976; 50 years ago
- Previous names: Sooner Fashion Mall (1976–1999)
- Developer: Monumental Properties
- Manager: GGP
- Owner: GGP
- Num. of stores: 76
- Num. of anchor tenants: 3 (2 open, 1 coming soon)
- Floor area: 511,569 sq ft (47,526.3 m^{2})
- Floors: 1
- Parking: 2,700 spaces
- Website: https://www.soonermall.com/

Sooner Mall is a regional shopping mall and trade area located in Norman, Oklahoma. It contains three major department store anchor spaces, and a total of 73 tenants comprising a total of approximately 512,000 square feet of gross leasable area. It is also the top employer of University of Oklahoma students. The anchor stores are JCPenney and Dillard's. There is one anchor store that was once Sears that is planned to become a Dick’s House of Sport. Junior anchors include Get Air Trampoline Park and Old Navy.

== History ==
The mall was built and opened in 1976 as Sooner Fashion Mall. The mall was developed by Monumental Properties.

The mall was expanded in 1988 when Dillard's moved to a new store. JCPenney, which already had a store in the mall, moved into Dillard's original location.

In 1996, the mall was purchased by General Growth Properties. On November 20, 1999, the mall was renamed to Sooner Mall.

In 2015, Sears Holdings spun off 235 of its properties, including the Sears at Sooner Mall, into Seritage Growth Properties.

On October 15, 2018, it was announced that Sears would be closing as part of a plan to close 142 stores nationwide.

In June, 2026, it was revealed that Dick’s Sporting Goods has been planning to open one of their large format Dick’s House of Sport concept stores inside the former Sears. This is part of Dick’s Sporting Goods expansion to open Dick’s House of Sport locations across the United States. Dick’s House of Sport would likely occupy the entire anchor space.
