= Centre of Tallahassee =

Mixed-use building in Florida

- Looking from Belk towards AMC
- Location: Tallahassee, Florida, United States
- Coordinates: 30.476°N 84.290°W
- Opened: 1971 (as Tallahassee Mall); 2016 (as Centre of Tallahassee)
- Closed: 2016 (as Tallahassee Mall) (semi-enclosed mixed-use shopping is still open)
- Developer: Cafaro Company
- Manager: Blackwater Resources LLC
- Num. of stores: 93
- Num. of anchor tenants: 4
- Floor area: 747,000 square feet (69,400 m^{2})
- Floors: 1 (2 in AMC and Belk wing)
- Parking: 10,230
- Website: centreoftallahassee.com

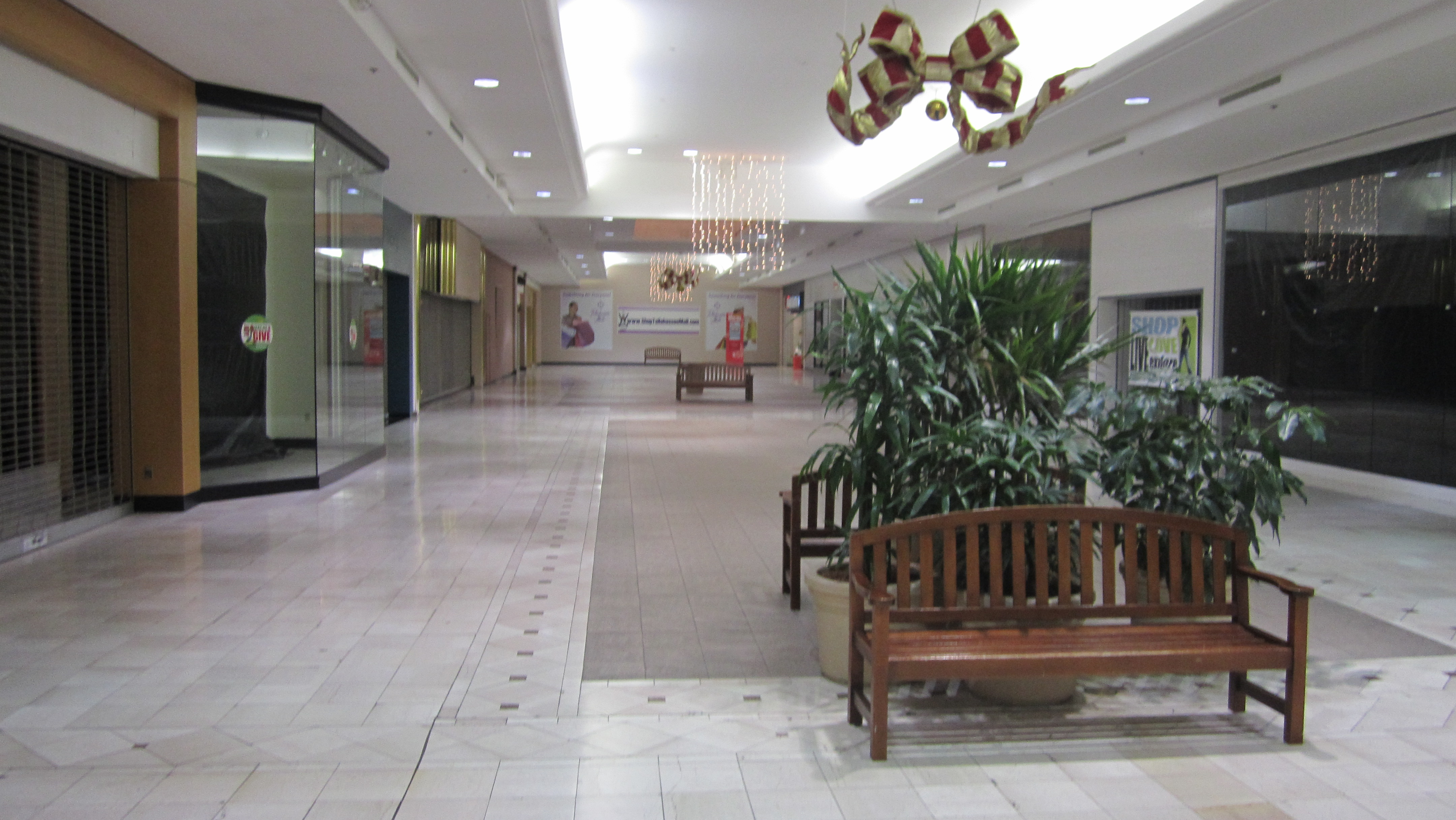
The former Dillard's wing in Tallahassee Mall in Tallahassee, Florida in 2011. The former big box store is now being refitted as a home for a branch campus of a local charter school.

The Centre of Tallahassee, formerly Tallahassee Mall, is a local semi-enclosed mixed-use shopping, entertainment, and work office complex (formerly a fully enclosed regional shopping mall) located at the intersection of North Monroe Street and John Knox Road in Tallahassee, Florida. Since the official close of the faltering Northwood Mall in 1986 (and subsequent repurposing as a strip mall-styled office complex), Tallahassee Mall became the older of two surviving enclosed malls in the Tallahassee area, the other being Governor's Square.

The Centre's present anchor stores include AMC Theatres, Ross Dress For Less, and Belk, as well as several big-box stores including Barnes & Noble and Guitar Center. Other stores that operated in the mall such as Sam Goody have closed their doors between the initial close of the Tallahassee Mall and its renewal as the Centre of Tallahassee.

== History ==
Tallahassee Mall opened in 1971 with three anchor stores: Woolco, Gayfers and Montgomery Ward; other major tenants included McCrory Stores and Walgreens. Woolco was closed in 1983 and replaced with Zayre. Seven years later, this anchor became Ames when the Zayre chain was acquired.

A new wing was added behind Montgomery Ward in 1992. This new wing ended in a fourth anchor store, Parisian. As a result of this wing opening, the Montgomery Ward store was bisected by a new mall concourse to connect the new wing to the existing mall. Development was also to have included Kmart moving into the former Ames space, plus the addition of Mervyn's. Afterward, then-manager Tom Strauss was fired by the mall's owners, Westinghouse, and the mall's management was sold to Edward J. DeBartolo Corporation. In 1995, a local group took over from DeBartolo.

Despite the opening of Service Merchandise and the first Tallahassee-area Goody's Family Clothing store in the former Ames in 1995, mall occupancy had decreased to forty-five percent by June of that year.

A twenty-screen movie theater owned by AMC Theatres was added to the Parisian wing in 1996. Gayfers was acquired by Dillard's in 1998, followed by the closure of two more anchors: Service Merchandise in 1999 and Montgomery Ward in 2000. Jones Lang LaSalle acquired the mall and then began renovations on it. The former was split between Ross Dress for Less and Shoe Carnival, while the latter became Burlington Coat Factory and other stores. Several new big-box stores were added, including Oshman's, Barnes & Noble and Guitar Center.

Feldman Mall Properties acquired the mall from Jones Lang LaSalle in 2005. Belk acquired the Parisian chain in 2007 and downgraded the Tallahassee Mall store as Belk, while Dillard's announced its closure in early 2008. The mall went into foreclosure in January 2011. Later in the same month, a real estate company based in Miami bought its ground lease for $100. It was then announced that the mall was not expected to close, in spite of its increasingly common reputation as a dead mall.

== Renovation as The Centre of Tallahassee ==
Renovations on the mall began in September 2014, including a planned demolition of the former Dillard's space, prior to a change of plans that resulted in the continued presence of the big box store so that it could be refitted. At the time renovation began, only 12 stores were open. At the same time, the mall was renamed Centre of Tallahassee. The Centre (formerly mall) was refitted so that a number of its former hallways would resemble the roads and paths of a town square in a traditional Swiss or Austrian burg, including cobbled walkways suitable for both slow-moving automotives and pedestrian foot traffic. Beginning with a liquor bar built into the AMC movie theater, a number of new commercial businesses were then established in the newly refurbished Centre of Tallahassee, including Urban Food Market, an organic food grocery store, wine bar, and deli, plus a branch campus of the popular Tallahassee charter middle school School of Arts and Sciences (locally known as SAS) located in the Centre of Tallahassee's former Dillard's anchor wing. Changes also included an outdoor amphitheater intended for public local concerts. Between 2016 and 2018, music artists including Steve Miller Band, Dashboard Confessional, Coolio, Willie Nelson, Blink 182, and Alice Cooper performed at the venue, drawing in a respectably sized audience from the Leon County and surrounding areas. During this time, Belk and AMC planned renovations as the mall transformed into the Centre of Tallahassee.

== The Alex Baker Era and the End of Commercial Redevelopment Plans ==
In addition to Ross Dress For Less, Barnes and Noble, Guitar Center, and Burlington Coat factory, a few staples of the former Tallahassee Mall remained in the new Centre of Tallahassee, including: Tara's, a hobbyist strategy board game store; Stone Age, a New Age paraphernalia store; and GameScape, a Desktop Computer-based video game arcade and comic book store. All of these stores remained consistently popular attractions with local clientele during the initial decline of the former Tallahassee Mall and its carefully directed transition into the Centre of Tallahassee. An upscale hotel-style apartment complex had been planned by the developers to complement and accompany the newly refurbished Centre of Tallahassee. In 2018, several businesses that had occupied space in both the Tallahassee Mall and Centre of Tallahassee iterations of the shopping center were asked to relocate to outside of the Centre in order to make way for new office space.

The renovation project was criticized by Tallahassee locals as a white elephant,. However, developers had hoped the presence of a school as well as a number of new restaurants and entertainment venues (including a seasonal ice skating rink) would allow the Centre of Tallahassee to thrive as a commercial success. Alex Baker, one of the main developers of the renovation project, died in 2017, with an adverse effect on the project of reviving the Centre. At the moment, the Centre of Tallahassee is undergoing another redevelopment into an office complex.

== Non-retail tenant era and transition to office complex ==
In addition to a charter school, two Public sector agencies, the Florida Department of State and the Florida Department of Children and Families, have put in a bid for office space at the Centre of Tallahassee, in the latter case to replace office space previously leased from the Northwood Centre (former Northwood Mall). The Florida Department of Children and Families' lease took place within a timespan of 2018-2019. In 2018, Tallahassee Democrat published an article interpreting these bids as a sign that the developers’ plan for the Centre was dropped or changed after Alex Baker's death.

These bids were met with some opposition after longtime owners of commercial space in the Centre were asked to relocate to make way for possible office space leased by these agencies.

As of 2019, a large portion of the Mall has been internally partitioned and spaces have been claimed by the Department of State, Department of Children and Families, and the Department of Health. However, some plans for retail use still remain, as the current developers plan for branches of Tom Thumb and Culver's to move into previously occupied space in the former mall.

In 2023, the Centre of Tallahassee was slated to be sold in a foreclosure auction.

In June 2024 Dreamland BBQ closed its Centre of Tallahassee location.
