= Columbia Mall (Missouri) =

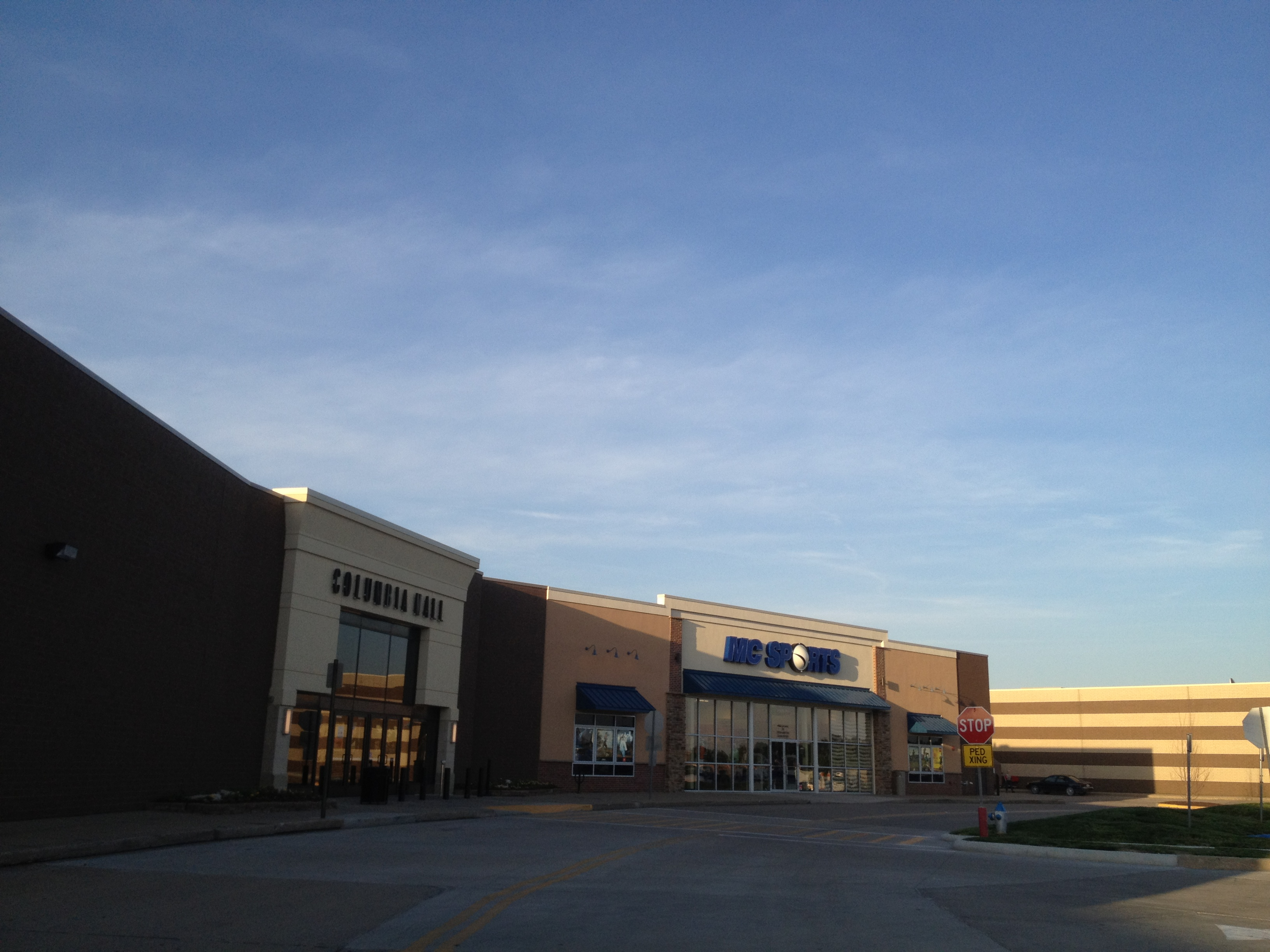
- Entrance to Columbia Mall, May 2012
- Location: Columbia, Missouri, United States
- Coordinates: 38°57′50″N 92°22′30″W
- Address: 2300 Bernadette Drive
- Opened: 1985; 41 years ago
- Developer: General Growth Properties
- Manager: GGP
- Owner: GGP
- Num. of stores: 90
- Num. of anchor tenants: 6
- Floor area: 737,000 square feet (68,500 m^{2})
- Floors: 1 (2 in JCPenney)
- Parking: 3500
- Public transit: Go COMO
- Website: visitcolumbiamall.com

The Columbia Mall is a shopping mall located in Columbia, Missouri. It was built in 1985 and is the largest mall in its area. The mall's anchor stores are Target, JCPenney, Level Up Entertainment, two Dillard's stores, and Barnes & Noble.

== Facility ==
The mall's anchors are two Dillard's stores, JCPenney, and Target. The mall also has a US Post Office and a Club Car Wash. It was the third mall in Columbia, after Parkade Plaza in 1965 and Biscayne Mall in 1972. In April 2018, Sears Holdings announced the closure of the mall's Sears store in July 2018, which was the company's last store in mid-Missouri. In August 2019, it was announced that a second Dillard's would move into the former Sears building. The store opened on February 22, 2020.

== Café Court ==
The mall has a food court, known as the Café Court. The Café Court has space for eight tenants, but only five are occupied. The restaurants, as of May 2024 are: Stir Fry 88, Subway, Bubble House, Taco John's, and Charleys Philly Steaks. An Auntie Anne's pretzel shop is located near. The Café Court is located near the Barnes & Noble wing, and was remodeled in 2003. It also has a carousel, which was added in the 2003 remodel.

== Coronavirus Pandemic ==
The mall was affected by the COVID-19 pandemic in 2020. The retailers struggled with the reopening, after the mall was forced to close. The mall re-opened on May 5, 2020. As an effect of Covid-19, JCPenney went bankrupt, but the Columbia location did not close. Pier 1 Imports shuttered all stores, and closed the Columbia Mall location. Victoria's Secret quit paying rent, and its parent company went bankrupt, closing many stores.
