= Interactive Design Institute =

The Interactive Design Institute (IDI) was the UK's leading provider of online courses in art and design, in collaboration with the University of Hertfordshire.

== History ==
IDI became the first online UK provider teaching art and design subjects in 2004. Before becoming the Interactive Design Institute, the company was known as the Studio Art School and under that name was approved by the City and Guilds of London Institute, the Scottish Qualifications Authority and ABC Awards to deliver a range of art and design courses online.

In 2008, IDI was approached by the University of Hertfordshire to adapt a number of their art and design degrees for online delivery. Since then, the partnership has grown and IDI now deliver four of the university's MA programmes and three of their BA (Hons) programmes 100% online to students across the world.

In June 2015 IDI secured £2 million of investment from the Scottish Loan Fund, which will allow the business to invest further in its delivery platform and systems.

As of February 2021 IDI no longer accepts new students, removing all courses from their website.

== Courses ==
IDI offers a range of online art and design courses from the University of Hertfordshire, up to and including master's degree level.

== QAA Review ==
With regards to the quality of the delivery of all of the University of Hertfordshire courses, IDI has undergone a Review for Specific Course Designation by the Quality Assurance Agency for Higher Education (QAA) and received the following judgements:

"The review team has confidence in the Interactive Design Institute's management of its responsibilities for the standards of the awards it offers on behalf of its awarding body. The review team has confidence that the Interactive Design Institute is fulfilling its responsibilities for managing and enhancing the quality of the intended learning opportunities it provides for students.

The review team concludes that reliance can be placed on the information the Interactive Design Institute produces for its intended audiences about the learning opportunities it offers."
