= Living Spaces =

American furniture retail chain

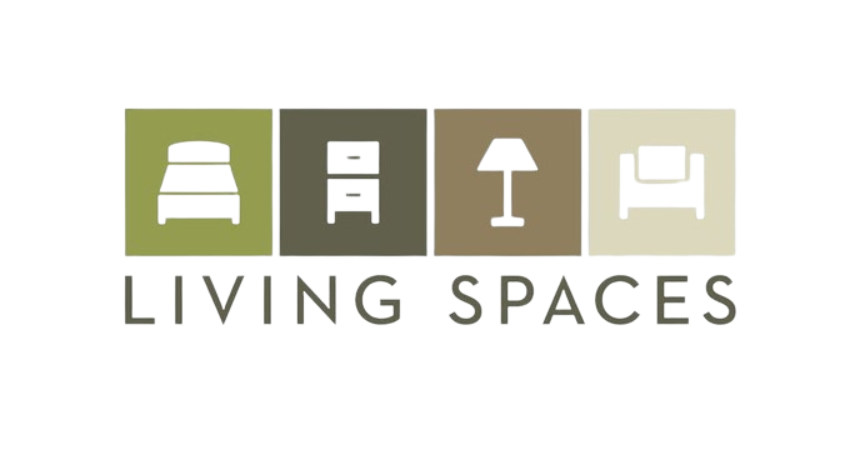

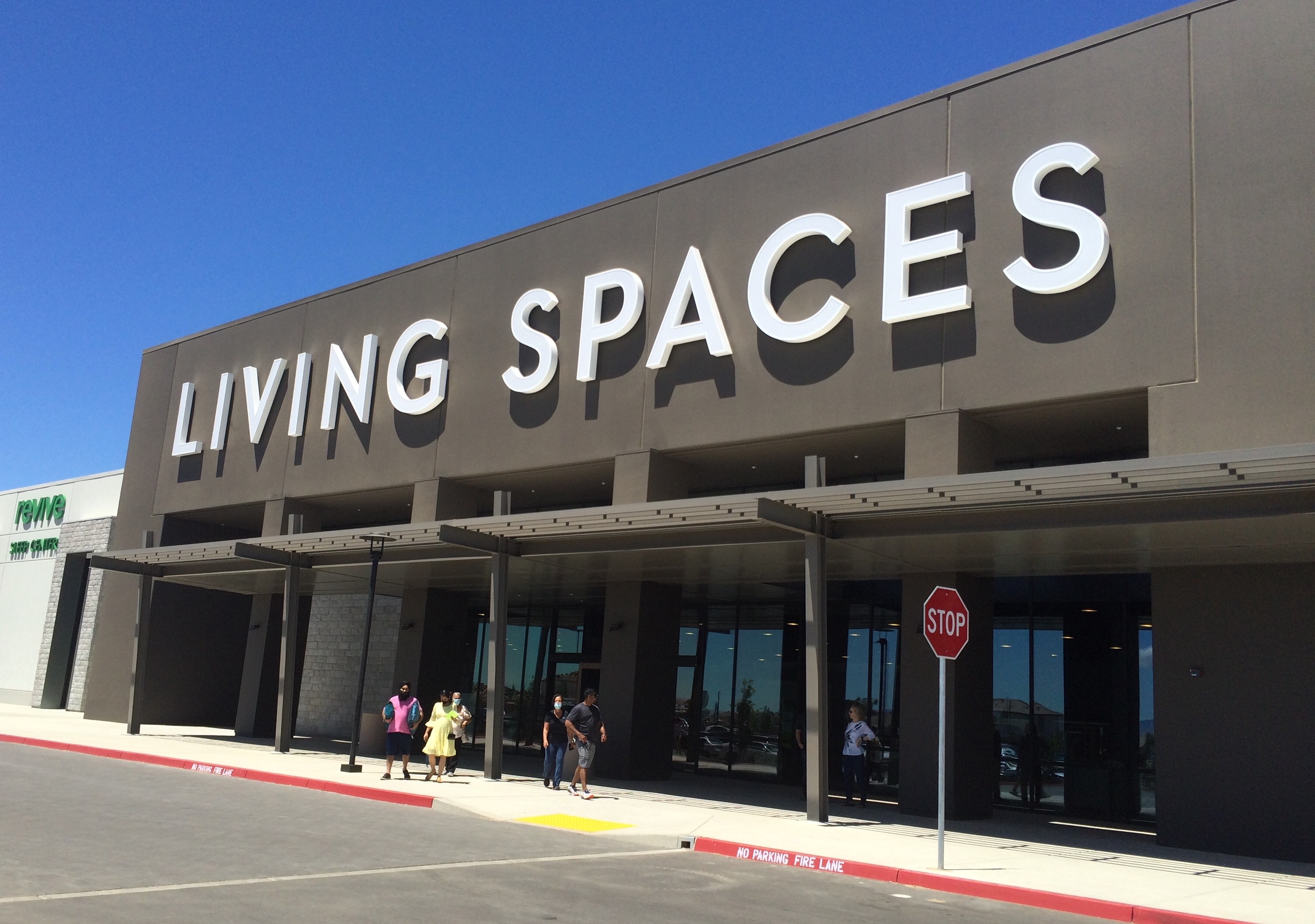
- A location in Manteca, California
- Formerly: Private
- Industry: Furnishings
- Founded: 2003
- Founder: Grover Geiselman; Sharm Scheurman
- Headquarters: La Mirada, California
- Number of locations: 40 (2024)
- Area served: Western United States
- Key people: Grover Geiselman (CEO)
- Website: www.livingspaces.com

Living Spaces is an American furniture retail chain based in La Mirada, California. It serves the Western United States, with forty stores in eight states. It sells over 35 brands of furniture and offers playrooms for children to play in while their parents shop. It is also one of the only stores that offer same-day delivery in some areas, being the inspiration for its motto: "Buy it today, enjoy it tonight."

== History ==
Living Spaces was founded in Rancho Cucamonga, California in August 2003, by Grover Geiselman and Sharm Scheuerman. They were inspired by Jim McIngvale's Gallery Furniture company, working there for four months until they moved to Rancho Cucamonga and found an old Costco building to use for a showroom-warehouse approach.

It opened its first Bay Area location in Fremont, in August 2015. Its first Nevada store, in Summerlin began operations in December 2016. A location in Pflugerville, Texas in May 2018 was the first one in Texas. In 2019, the company announced that it was to start shipping furniture nationwide. In April 2022, Living Spaces partnered with Drew and Jonathan Scott to release an exclusive furniture collection.

== Locations ==
Living Spaces has 40 locations, most are in the Western United States. A new location opened in July 2026 in Buford, Georgia. The majority of locations are mainly concentrated around the Southwest, with stores in either California, Texas, or Arizona. The rest are in Utah, Colorado, Kansas, Nevada, Oklahoma, and now Georgia.

== Philanthropy ==
The company has partnered with the nonprofit Furnishing Hope since 2011, helping provide furniture to wounded veterans. During the grand opening of their Pflugerville store, the company presented a $50,000 check to Dell Children's Trust. It also holds annual blood drive in some of its stores in a collaboration with the American Red Cross.
