= Izzy's Pizza =

American pizza restaurant chain

Izzy's
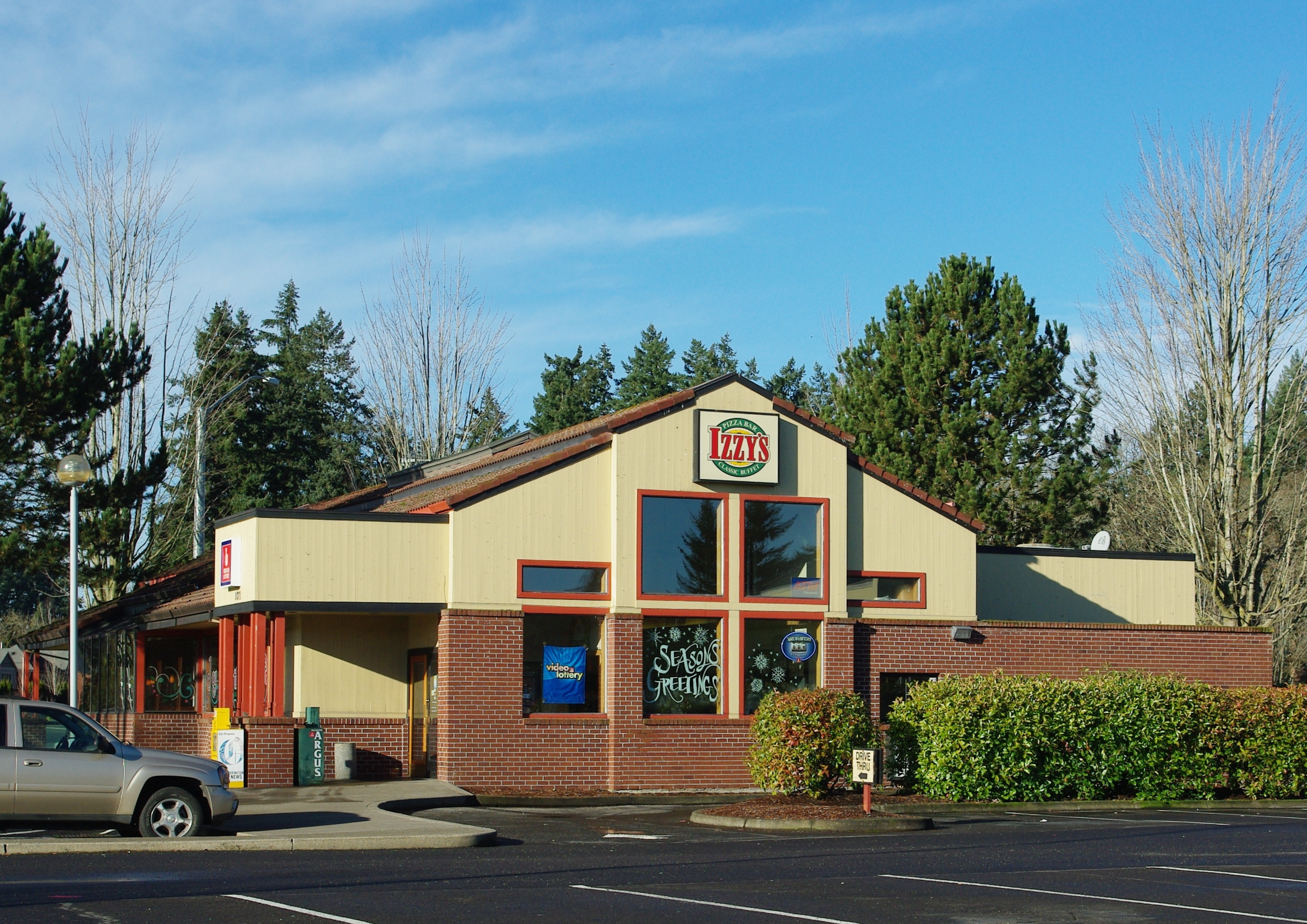
- Exterior of an Izzy's Pizza restaurant in Hillsboro, Oregon, in 2010
- Type: Private
- Industry: Food
- Founded: January 1979; 47 years ago Albany, Oregon, U.S.
- Founder: Izzy Covalt
- Products: Pizza, buffet

Izzy's Pizza was pizza restaurant chain based in the U.S. state of Oregon. At its peak it had 36 locations spread around Oregon, California, and Washington. The chain was named after Izzy Covalt, who with her husband, converted eight franchised Shakey’s Pizza shops they owned into the new restaurant.

== History ==
The first Izzy's opened in Albany, Oregon, in 1979 after the franchisees Izzy and Jim Covalt converted their Shakey’s Pizza after dispute over increased franchise fees. Izzy's added restaurants in Eugene, Springfield, Corvallis, Keizer, Bend, McMinnville, Hillsboro, Beaverton, Salem, Newberg, and Gresham in Oregon, and in Washington state in Olympia, Bellingham, and Everett, among other cities. The last of the locations closed in 2020 during the COVID 19 pandemic. In 2024, the company made a comeback with a food truck. Company founder and namesake Izzy Covalt died at age 97 in March 2025.
