= Brookfield Property Partners =

Canada-based real estate company

Brookfield Property Partners L.P.
- Type: Subsidiary
- ISIN: BMG162491499; BMG162491564; BMG162491648
- Industry: Commercial property
- Founded: January 3, 2013; 13 years ago
- Headquarters: Hamilton, Bermuda
- Area served: United States, Canada, Australia, Europe, Brazil, and Asia
- Key people: Jeffrey M. Blidner (Chairman of BPY GP Board); Brian W. Kingston (CEO of Service Provider); Bryan K. Davis (CFO of Service Provider)
- Products: Commercial property
- Revenue: US$7.147 billion (2025)
- Net income: -US$305 million (2025)
- Total assets: US$99.280 billion (2025)
- Total equity: US$42.574 billion (2025)
- Number of employees: ▼ Approximately 24,000 (2025); 30,200, including affiliates (2023)
- Parent: Brookfield Corporation
- Subsidiaries: BGRE (35.89% general partnership interest); GGP
- Website: bpy.brookfield.com

Brookfield Property Partners L.P. is a limited partnership that owns office buildings and shopping centers/shopping malls, as well as minority limited partner interests in investment funds sponsored by affiliates that invest in other types of commercial property. It is headquartered in Hamilton, Bermuda.

The partnership is a wholly owned subsidiary of Brookfield Corporation, but it has outstanding publicly traded preferred stock. The partnership owns a 35.89% general partnership interest in BGRE, formerly Brookfield Properties, while a 63.46% beneficial interest in BGRE is owned by Brookfield Corporation.

The partnership was formed in January 2013 and in April 2013, Brookfield Corporation completed the corporate spin-off of the partnership. In August 2018, the partnership acquired the interests in GGP Inc. that it did not already own. In July 2021, the partnership once again became a wholly owned subsidiary of Brookfield Corporation.

In 2023, approximately 65% of the partnership's revenues were generated in the United States, while 35% of revenues originated from Canada, Australia, the United Kingdom, Europe, Brazil and Asia.

== History ==
Brookfield Corporation completed the corporate spin-off of Brookfield Property Partners in April 2013, with shares listed on the Toronto and New York Stock Exchanges.

In June 2014, Brookfield Corporation acquired Brookfield Office Properties via a tender offer.

In December 2014, Qatar Investment Authority invested $1.8 billion into the partnership in the form of preferred equity securities.

In November 2015, Ric Clark became chairman and Brian Kingston became CEO.

In July 2021, the partnership was acquired by Brookfield Corporation. The transaction was intended to simplify the company's corporate structure and accounting.

== Investments ==
=== Real estate ===
As of September 30, 2024, the partnership owned 72 million leasable square feet in 125 office buildings in markets such as New York, London, Dubai, Toronto, and Berlin.

Notable properties owned by the partnership include Brookfield Place in New York and Bank of America Plaza in Los Angeles.

In 2013, the partnership bought a 22% interest in China Xintiandi, operator of a shopping, dining and entertainment complex in Xintiandi, Shanghai, from Shui On Land for $500 million.

In late 2014, Brookfield acquired a portfolio of office parks in India.

Following a $300 million renovation, in March 2015, the company opened Brookfield Place, a 375,000 square-foot retail space in New York City.

In a joint venture with Qatar Investment Authority, the partnership acquired Canary Wharf Group in April 2015 via the acquisition of Songbird Estates Plc., which owned 69% of CWG, in a deal that valued Songbird at about £2.6 billion.

Also in April 2015, the company signed Skadden Arps to be the anchor tenant at One Manhattan West, a 2.1 million square-foot office tower in New York City.

In October 2015, it sold a 44% interest in the $8 billion Manhattan West development in New York to the Qatar Investment Authority.

In December 2015 and January 2016, Brookfield acquired seven office buildings in São Paulo and Rio de Janeiro, Brazil.

Together with Korea Investment Corporation, the partnership acquired Potsdamer Platz in Berlin for $1.41 billion in January 2016.

In 2016, Brookfield, with a joint venture partner, Investment Corporation of Dubai, commenced construction in Dubai on ICD Brookfield Place, a 1.5 million square foot office and retail development in the Dubai International Financial Centre district.

In late 2016, Brookfield expanded into South Korea, acquiring the International Finance Center Seoul (IFC Seoul) with three high-rise office towers, a three-level retail mall, and a five-star Conrad Hotels.

In September 2026, Brookfield agreed to acquire a minority interest in American Real Estate Partners.

=== Retail ===
As of September 30, 2024, the partnership owned 106 million square feet of retail in 103 properties in the United States.

In September 2014, Brookfield signed a lease with Hudson's Bay Company, owners of Saks Fifth Avenue department stores, at Brookfield Place, to open an 85,000 square foot store and occupy 400,000 square feet of office space in the building.

In July 2016, an investment fund sponsored by Brookfield Corporation acquired Rouse Properties, owner of 35 malls and retail centers in 21 states.

Brookfield first acquired an interest in GGP Inc. in 2016. In August 2018, Brookfield acquired the remaining shares of GGP. Concurrent with the GGP deal, Brookfield acquired retail properties on Bleecker Street in Manhattan from New York REIT with plans to revitalize the properties by creating an incubator for online and emerging retailers, and hosting cultural events and art installations.

In September 2020, the partnership, along with Simon Property Group, acquired the retail business of JCPenney. That month, during the COVID-19 pandemic, the partnership laid off 20% of its staff in its retail group, approximately 300 people.

=== Limited partnership interests in investment funds sponsored by affiliates ===
The partnership owns limited partnership interests in investment funds sponsored by affiliates that have investments in various commercial property sectors. These include funds in the Brookfield Strategic Real Estate Partners (BSREP) series. The partnership owns a 31% interest in BSREP I, a 26% interest in BSREP II, an 8% interest in BSREP III, and a 23% interest in BSREP IV. The company also committed $300 million to the Brookfield Fairfield U.S. Multifamily Value Add Fund.

== Investments by affiliates of parent company, Brookfield Corporation ==
=== Industrial property ===
Between 2012 and 2014, an investment fund sponsored by Brookfield Corporation acquired Atlanta-based Industrial Developments International and London-based Gazeley, industrial-property companies focused on the US, UK, Europe and Asia. The companies were merged to form IDI Gazeley in May 2014. The European arm was sold to GLP for €2.4 billion in October 2017. The U.S. division was renamed IDI Logistics in January 2018 and remained as a portfolio company of Brookfield Corporation.

=== Multifamily ===
In 2010, Brookfield Corporation acquired 65% of Fairfield Residential LLC for $19 million, with the remaining interest owned by CalSTRS. It acquired a portfolio of 4,892 units in North Carolina, South Carolina and Virginia from Babcock & Brown for $414 million in 2013. In 2019, it owned 43,000 apartments and Brookfield sold its interest to CalSTRS.

In April 2015, an investment fund sponsored by Brookfield Corporation acquired Associated Estates Realty for $2.5 billion.

In October 2015, the partnership acquired Greenpoint Landing, a residential development in Brooklyn.

=== Hospitality ===
In 2011, an investment fund sponsored by Brookfield Corporation acquired Hard Rock Hotel & Casino in Las Vegas, which was sold to Virgin Hotels in 2018.

In 2012, Brookfield Corporation, the lender on the properties, acquired Atlantis Paradise Island in the Bahamas.

In 2014, Brookfield Corporation acquired Thayer Lodging Group, one of the few private-equity firms that focuses on hotel investment.

In 2015, an investment fund sponsored by Brookfield Corporation acquired Center Parcs UK, an operator of five short-break holiday villages in England, from affiliates of The Blackstone Group for £2.45 billion.

=== Triple-net-leased automotive dealerships ===
In 2014, an investment fund sponsored by Brookfield Corporation acquired Capital Automotive and its portfolio of 450 triple-net-leased automotive dealerships in the U.S. for $4.3 billion. In 2022, it was sold to a fund managed by Ares Management.

=== Self-storage ===
In 2016, an investment fund sponsored by Brookfield Corporation acquired Simply Self Storage, an owner/operator of 90 self-storage facilities in the U.S. totaling 6.8 million square feet, for $829 million. It was sold to funds managed by The Blackstone Group in 2020 for $1.2 billion.

=== Student housing ===
In 2016, an investment fund sponsored by Brookfield Corporation acquired a portfolio of 13 student housing properties totaling 5,700 beds primarily in four university markets in the UK for a total purchase price of approximately £400 million. It acquired 3 additional properties in February 2022 for £94 million. In May 2022, the student housing division was sold by the fund to GIC and Greystar for £3.3 billion.

=== Manufactured housing ===
In 2017, an investment fund sponsored by Brookfield Corporation acquired a portfolio of 135 manufactured housing communities comprising 33,000 pads across 13 US states. By January 2024, when it owned 175 manufactured housing properties, it sold 19 properties for $325 million.
