= Industrial Developments International =

IDI
- Industry: Industrial real estate development
- Founded: 1989
- Headquarters: Atlanta, Georgia, U.S.
- Area served: Atlanta; Chicago; Cincinnati; Dallas; South Florida; Los Angeles; Memphis
- Website: www.idilogistics.com

Industrial Developments International (IDI) is a privately held real estate investment trust. In 2013, the company was valued at $1.8 billion, with nearly 7 million square feet under development in nine states and ownership or interests in millions of square feet of investment grade assets. In addition to leasing and investment services, IDI has also constructed industrial facilities in the U.S., Canada and Mexico.

Brookfield agreed to acquire Industrial Developments International from Kajima for US$1.1 billion.

== History ==
IDI was established in 1989 in Atlanta by Henry "Greg" Gregory and a few partners, including former president and chief executive officer Timothy Gunter. The company started with $35 million in investments from Japan-based parent company, Kajima, and a bridge loan from First Union National Bank, now Wells Fargo. IDI was one of the first companies to approach industrial development from a national standpoint to meet customers' needs.

In 2013, IDI was acquired by Brookfield Asset Management (BAM). In 2014, IDI and Gazeley, a European industrial real estate company, were co-branded by Brookfield as IDI Gazeley Brookfield Logistics Properties.

In 2017, Gazeley was sold and IDI is now known as IDI Logistics.

In 2018, IDI Logistics was sold to Ivanhoé Cambridge and Oxford Properties in a 50-50 joint venture partnership agreement.

== Services ==
IDI offers development, investment management, property management and leasing services. IDI has developed approximately 115 million square feet of industrial space, with projects ranging from 80,000 square feet to more than 1 million square feet throughout North America. Projects include buildings for Mitsubishi Electric Cooling & Heating, Speedway Distribution Center and Riverside Business Center in Atlanta. In 2013, the company had about 7 million square feet in development throughout nine states. IDI's specific development offerings include the following: multimarket program planning, design, market research and site selection, site review, LEED/Sustainable design consulting and construction management.

- Development: At any given time, IDI has 8 to 12 million square feet of move-in-ready industrial, office and distribution facilities available across North America.
- Investment Management: IDI has ownership or interests in 36 million square feet of investment grade assets.
- Property Management: IDI manages 50 million square feet throughout North America.
- Leasing services: During the first fiscal quarter of 2013, IDI leased more than 2 million square feet across eight markets. IDI leased the most properties in Memphis during this quarter and obtained its largest lease in Philadelphia.

== Locations ==
IDI is headquartered in Atlanta and has seven offices across North America including Memphis, Chicago, Cincinnati, Southern California, Dallas and South Florida.
