= BGRE =

Commercial real estate company in North America

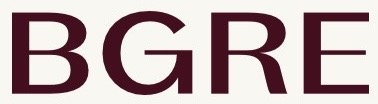
- Formerly: Brookfield Properties (1923–2026)
- Type: Private
- Industry: Real estate
- Founded: 1923; 103 years ago
- Headquarters: Brookfield Place, New York, United States
- Area served: Worldwide
- Key people: Brian Kingston, Executive chair
- Services: Property development and management
- Revenue: ▲US$2.4 billion (2014)
- Net income: ▲US$2.8 billion (2014)
- Total assets: ▲US$34.4 billion (2014)
- Number of employees: 2,000+
- Parent: Brookfield Corporation
- Website: www.bgre.com

BGRE, formerly Brookfield Properties, is an American subsidiary of commercial real estate firm Brookfield Property Partners, which itself is a subsidiary of alternative asset management company Brookfield Corporation. It is responsible for the asset management of the company's real estate portfolio, including office, multi-family residential, retail, hospitality, and logistics buildings.

The assets of shopping mall operator GGP were integrated into Brookfield Properties after its acquisition by Brookfield Property Partners in 2018. Brookfield reverted to the GGP brand for its American retail business in 2026. As of 2024, Brookfield Properties operates corporate offices in nine countries around the world, including China, India, Germany and the U.S. In July 2026, the company rebranded from Brookfield Properties to BGRE.

== History ==
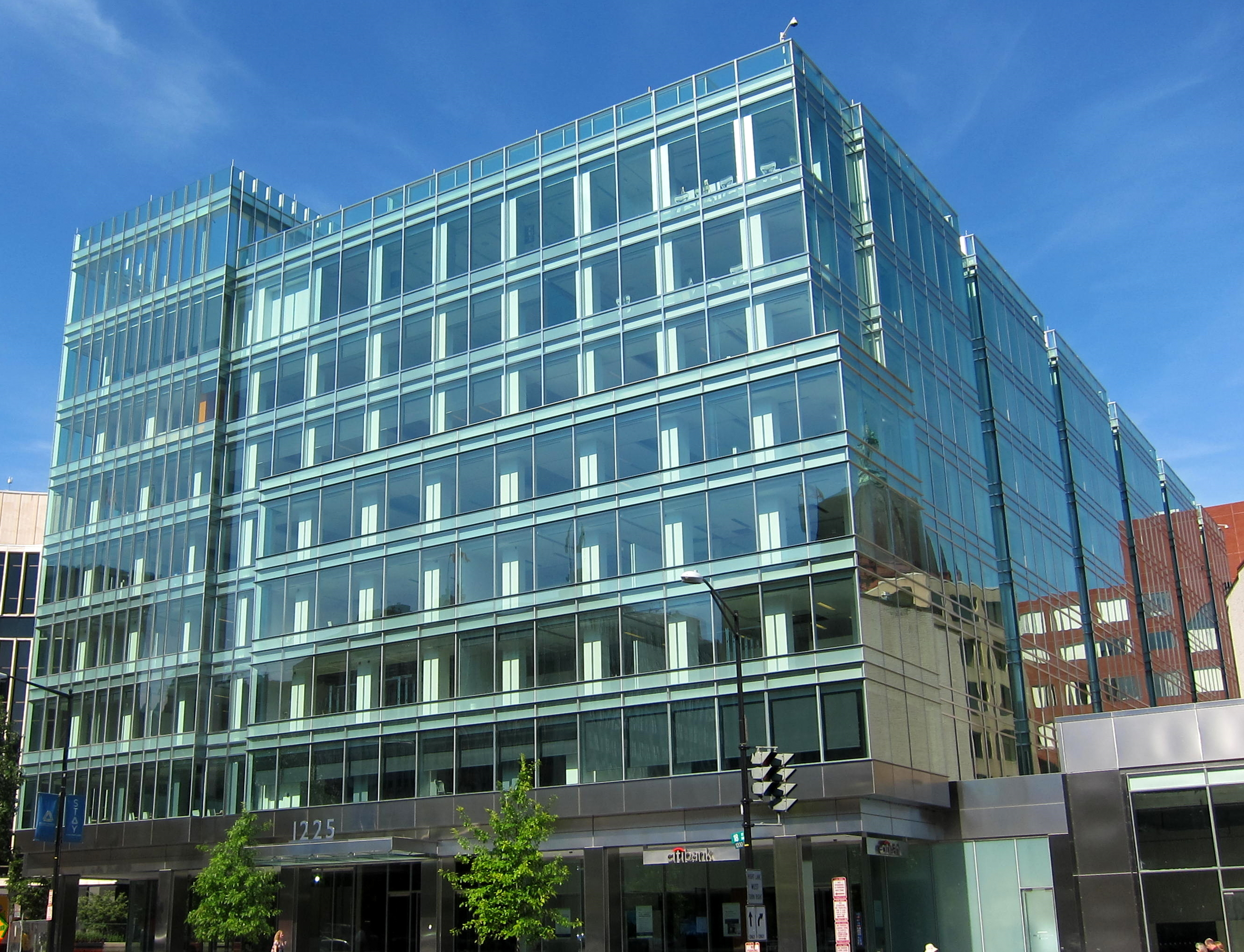
Brookfield's 1225 Connecticut Avenue in Washington, D.C.

The company's roots go back to the early 1900s in Montreal, Quebec. It was known then as the Canadian Arena Company and operated the Montreal Arena. In a partnership with Toronto investors, it built Arena Gardens in Toronto. In the 1910s, it opened an office and began business in Brazil, while in the 1920s, it built the Montreal Forum to house the Montreal Maroons and Montreal Canadiens National Hockey League franchises; from 1935 to 1957, the company also owned the Canadiens. The company was acquired by Edper Investments in 1970. During the 1970s, when the company was known as Carena Properties, it expanded its business into commercial real estate. After the Montreal Forum closed, the Forum was sold to competitor Canderel Properties.

In 1989, Carena acquired a 33% interest in Olympia & York Developments Ltd., developers of the World Financial Center in New York, and in 1990, Brookfield acquired a 50% interest in a portfolio of office properties in Toronto, Denver and Minneapolis from BCE Development Corporation. In 1994, this holding was increased to 100% and included BCE Place, now Brookfield Place, Brookfield Properties' flagship office complex in Toronto.

In 1996, Carena acquired a 46% interest in World Financial Properties, a corporation formed from the bankruptcy of Olympia & York, which included three of the four towers of the World Financial Center, One Liberty Plaza, 245 Park Avenue in Manhattan. That year, Carena changed its name to Brookfield Properties Corporation.

In 1997, Brookfield Properties purchased 45% of Gentra, Inc., owner of several commercial properties in Toronto.

=== 2000s ===
In 2000, Brookfield Properties acquired a portfolio of Calgary office properties, including the Bankers Hall complex.

In April 2001, the company lost out to Silverstein Properties, Inc., on the lease of the World Trade Center in New York City before the complex was destroyed during the September 11 attacks.

In 2003, Brookfield Properties completed the spin-off of Brookfield Homes, now part of Brookfield Residential, Brookfield Asset Management's U.S.-based home building business.

In 2005, Brookfield Properties acquired a 25% interest in O&Y Properties Corporation and O&Y Real Estate Investment Trust, expanding the company's real estate portfolio in four Canadian cities.

In 2006, the company acquired Trizec Properties, which was founded in 1960 by William Zeckendorf, builder of Place Ville Marie.

=== 2010s ===
In 2010, it entered into London and Australian markets by acquiring the 100 Bishopsgate development site in the City of London and 16 properties encompassing 8 million SF in three major Australian cities.

On Earth Day on April 22, 2010, the company was listed as one of Canada's "The Green 30" Organizations Based On Eco-Friendly Programs and Practices based on an employee poll.

In 2011, Brookfield Properties divested its residential group consisting of Carma Developers and Brookfield Homes (Ontario) Ltd. to merge with Brookfield Homes Corporation to form Brookfield Residential Properties Inc. That same year, Brookfield Properties changed its name to Brookfield Office Properties to reflect its focus on commercial office properties.

In 2013, Brookfield Office Properties Inc. became the largest office landlord in Los Angeles after acquiring MPG Office Trust Inc.'s downtown portfolio. MPG had been one of Southern California's most prominent real estate developers and a longtime L.A. office tower owner. The MPG buildings they acquired include the Gas Company Tower, 777 Tower and the Wells Fargo Center on Bunker Hill.

In June 2014, Brookfield Property Partners (BPY) completed their acquisition of Brookfield Office Properties (BPO). BPO common shares were de-listed from the Toronto Stock Exchange as of June 10, 2014, and from the New York Stock Exchange on June 20, 2014. Brookfield Property Partners is now the sole owner of all of the issued and outstanding common shares of BPO.

In January 2016, Brookfield Properties purchased KIC, along with KIC's Berlin office.

In 2016, Brookfield Asset Management, which owned 33 percent of Rouse Properties, made an unsolicited offer to purchase the rest of the company. A purchase agreement was eventually reached, valuing the company at $2.8 billion. Brookfield's acquisition of Rouse Properties was completed on July 6, 2016. The Rouse Properties brand would ultimately be absorbed into Brookfield.

On August 28, 2018, Brookfield Property Partners acquired Chicago-based real estate investment trust and shopping mall operator GGP Inc. (General Growth Properties), and merged its assets into Brookfield Properties, for $9 billion. Brookfield immediately sold a 49% interest in each of three former GGP super-regional malls to CBRE Group, and a 49% interest in three other former GGP malls to TIAA subsidiary Nuveen, seeking additional joint ventures for its newly acquired malls. The acquisition added 162 shopping malls comprising approximately 146 million sq ft (13.6 million m^{2}) of gross leasable area to Brookfield's portfolio.

In December 2018, Brookfield Properties took over the management of Forest City Realty Trust's real estate portfolio after the company was acquired by a fund affiliated with Brookfield Asset Management.

=== 2020s ===
In September 2020, the company's retail group announced a layoff of 20% of its workforce of about 2,000 people. Around June 2021, the company opened an office in Sydney, Australia.

In May 2023, Brookfield Properties announced a purchase of a 115,000 square foot Doral warehouse at 1500 Northwest 95th Avenue for $16 million. In January 2023, Brookfield Properties purchased subsidiaries from Deutsche Bank A.G., acquiring Deutsche Bank's London and New York offices.

In February 2024, the company opened offices in India and the UAE. In July 2026, Brookfield Properties rebranded as BGRE. The rebrand does not include changes to the business's operations or personnel.

== See also ==
- List of GGP shopping malls
- GGP (company)
