= GGP (company) =

U.S. shopping mall operator

GGP Services Inc.

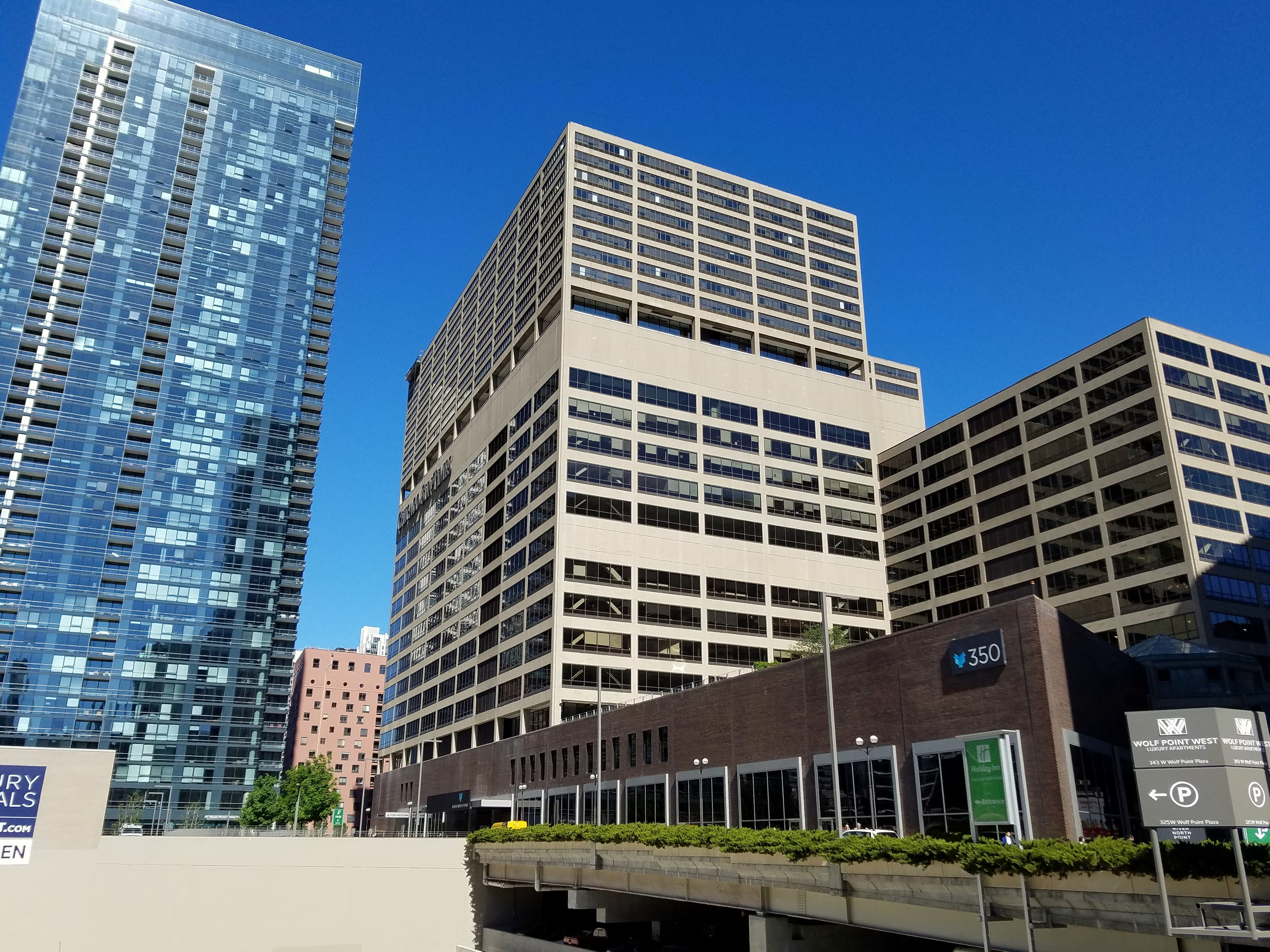
- Exterior of the GGP headquarters at 350 North Orleans (center) in Chicago (2017)
- Trade name: GGP
- Formerly: General Management (1954–1970); General Growth Properties (1970–2017); GGP Inc. (2017–2018); Brookfield Properties Retail Group (2018–2026); GGP Retail LLC (early–mid 2026)
- Type: Subsidiary
- Traded as: NYSE: GGP
- Industry: Commercial real estate
- Genre: Shopping malls
- Founded: 1954; 72 years ago in Cedar Rapids, Iowa, United States
- Founders: Martin Bucksbaum; Matthew Bucksbaum; Maurice Bucksbaum
- Headquarters: 350 North Orleans Street, Chicago, Illinois, United States
- Area served: United States
- Key people: Kevin McCrain (CEO)
- Revenue: ▲$2.346 billion (2016)
- Net income: ▲$1.272 billion (2016)
- Total assets: ▼$22.732 billion (2016)
- Total equity: ▲$8.635 billion (2016)
- Owner: Brookfield Property Partners (2018–present)
- Number of employees: 1,200 (2026)
- Parent: Brookfield Properties (2018–present)
- Website: ggp.com

GGP Services Inc. (doing business as GGP; originally an initialism of General Growth Properties) is an American commercial real estate company. It was founded in 1954 and was the country's second-largest shopping mall operator at the time of its acquisition by Brookfield Property Partners and integration into Brookfield Properties in 2018. In 2026, Brookfield Properties' U.S. retail division rebranded as GGP.

Founded by brothers Martin, Matthew and Maurice Bucksbaum in Cedar Rapids, Iowa, it moved to Chicago, in 1997. In 2009, it filed for bankruptcy protection, becoming the largest U.S. real estate firm to do so. In 2018, its portfolio included 125 properties comprising about 121,000,000 square feet (11,200,000 m^{2}) in 40 U.S. states, behind only Simon Property Group in total square footage.

== History ==
=== 20th century ===
General Growth was founded in Iowa by three brothers, Martin, Matthew and Maurice Bucksbaum, in 1954 as General Management. That year, they borrowed $1.2 million to develop their first shopping center, Town & Country Shopping Center in Cedar Rapids, Iowa, in order to open a fourth location for the grocery store founded by their father.

By 1964, the company owned five malls and moved its headquarters to Des Moines, Iowa. In 1970, General Management became General Growth Properties (GGP) and became a public company via an initial public offering. In 1984, the company sold its holdings to Equitable Real Estate Investment Management for $800 million in the largest-ever single-asset real estate transaction to date, but retained the property management of the assets. In 1989, the company acquired Center Companies, creating the fourth-largest shopping center management company in the United States.

In 1993, the company once again became a public company via an initial public offering, raising $400 million. In 1994, the company purchased a 40% interest in Centermark Properties from Prudential Financial. In 1995, the company sold 25% of its 40% stake, yielding a profit of over $100 million. In 1995, the company also purchased the Homart Development Company from Sears for $1.85 billion. In 1995, co-founder and CEO Martin Bucksbaum died and the company moved its headquarters from Des Moines to Chicago. In 1999, John Bucksbaum succeeded his father as CEO.

=== 21st century ===
Logo used until 2010

In 2000, the company moved its headquarters from Des Moines to Chicago. The company occupied a historic building on North Wacker Drive designed by architectural firm Graham, Anderson, Probst & White, that was demolished in 2018. In 2004, the company acquired The Rouse Company, which owned 37 regional shopping malls and Howard Hughes Corporation, a land development company, for $7.2 billion in cash. By 2008, the company had taken on $25 billion in debt and the company was facing required debt payments. John Bucksbaum was ousted as CEO, though he remained chairman of the board, and Adam Metz was named CEO. In December 2008, hedge fund manager Bill Ackman disclosed a 25% ownership stake in the company.

In 2009, the company missed a deadline to repay $900 million in loans backed by two Las Vegas properties, putting the company in danger of filing for bankruptcy protection. At that point, the stock price was down 98% in 12 months. The Bucksbaum family's stake in the firm, which was worth $2.5 billion in 2005, had declined in value by a similar amount. On April 16, 2009, the company filed one of the largest real estate bankruptcies ever and received $375 million in debtor-in-possession financing from Pershing Square Capital Management, the hedge fund managed by Bill Ackman. In February 2010, Brookfield Asset Management made a $2.625 billion equity investment in the company. In November 2010, the company exited bankruptcy protection. Creditors were paid in full and equity holders made a "substantial" recovery of their investment, both of which are unusual in bankruptcy filings. In conjunction with the reorganization, the company spun off Howard Hughes Corporation to its shareholders.

In December 2010, CEO Adam Metz and President and COO Thomas Nolan left the company and Sandeep Mathrani, formerly the head of the retail division of Vornado Realty Trust, was named CEO. In 2011, the company sold Faneuil Hall for $140 million. In January 2012, the company completed the spin off of Rouse Properties to its shareholders. In 2013, co-founder Matthew Bucksbaum died. In February 2014, Bill Ackman sold his remaining shares in the company back to the company for $556 million. In April 2015, the company acquired the Crown Building for $1.78 billion. In January 2017, the company changed its name to GGP Inc.

=== 2018 acquisition by Brookfield Property Partners ===
On August 28, 2018, GGP was acquired by Brookfield Property Partners and management of its former portfolio was transferred to its Brookfield Properties subsidiary for $9 billion in cash. The transaction reunited the malls spun off in the Rouse Properties spinoff with the GGP malls. Upon closing the acquisition, Brookfield immediately sold a 49% interest in each of three former GGP super-regional malls to CBRE Group, and a 49% interest in three other former GGP malls to TIAA subsidiary Nuveen, seeking additional joint ventures for its newly-acquired malls.

In January 2026, Brookfield Properties' retail group reverted to the GGP brand. GGP owned 101 retail properties in the US as of January 2026.

== See also ==
- BGRE
- Brookfield Property Partners
- List of GGP shopping malls
