= Cafaro =

Cafaro is an Italian surname.

Notable people with this surname include:

- Capri Cafaro, American politician
- Debra Cafaro, American executive
- Erin Cafaro, American rower
- Lou Cafaro, Australian boxer
- Mathieu Cafaro, French footballer
- Pasquale Cafaro, Italian composer
- Paul Cafaro, better known by the stage name Blag Dahlia, American musician
- Vincent Cafaro, Italian mobster
- William M. Cafaro, American businessman

== See also ==
- Caffaro (disambiguation)
- Cafaro Company, American retailer
