= John J. Cafaro =

American businessman

John J. "J.J." Cafaro is an American businessman and convicted felon best known for his business ventures in Northeast Ohio and his controversial political involvement with U.S. president Donald Trump. He pleaded guilty to bribing U.S. representative James Traficant in 2001.

== Early life ==
Cafaro is the son of William M. Cafaro, a national mall developer who founded the Cafaro Company and left $800 million to his family following his death in 1998.

== Career ==
Cafaro was the executive vice president at the Cafaro Company and was involved with developing Meadowbrook Mall and the Ohio Valley Mall. He had largely left the business in the late 1980s as his older brother, Anthony Cafaro, became the company's president.

Cafaro acquired the Avanti Motor Company in 1987. Under his ownership, Avanti moved all vehicle production from South Bend, Indiana, to Youngstown, Ohio. Only 405 Avantis were made in four years at the Youngstown plant, which closed in 1991.

In 2001, Cafaro pled guilty to federal charges of conspiracy to commit bribery. He cooperated with federal investigators, resulting in a more lenient penalty; he was fined $150,000 and placed on probation for bribing then-U.S. representative James Traficant. In 2005, Cafaro also admitted to making illegal contributions to the election campaign of his daughter, Capri Cafaro, in 2004. On 8 June 2010, he was sentenced to $250,000 and three years probation in this case.

Cafaro retired from the Cafaro Company in 2009. In 2010, he founded the J.J. Cafaro Investment Trust in Brookfield, Ohio.

Cafaro reportedly donated $250,000 in 2020 and $100,000 in 2024 to U.S. president Donald Trump's campaigns, and contributed more than $300,000 to political committees connected to Trump. He is a neighbor to Trump's Mar-a-Lago resort in Palm Beach, Florida.

=== 2026 Lincoln Memorial Reflecting Pool controversy ===
Green Water Solutions LLC, which does business as Greenwater Services, is owned by Cafaro's firm. In April 2026, Greenwater Services received a no-bid, $1.7 million contract from the U.S. Department of the Interior to refurbish the Lincoln Memorial Reflecting Pool's filtration system on the National Mall. David Schutzenhofer, who manages Trump National Golf Club Bedminster, reportedly advised on the Reflecting Pool project and was the person in contact with Greenwater Services ahead of the contract being awarded.

== Personal life ==
Cafaro is married to Janet Cafaro. He lives in Palm Beach, Florida, and previously had a residence in Chevy Chase, Maryland. One of Cafaro's daughters, Capri Cafaro, is a former Ohio State Senator.
