= Huntington Mall =

Shopping mall in West Virginia

The Huntington Mall
- Location: Barboursville, West Virginia, United States
- Coordinates: 38°25′20″N 82°16′0″W
- Address: PO Box 4008; I-64 & Mall Rd.
- Opened: February 18, 1981; 45 years ago
- Developer: Cafaro Company
- Owner: Cafaro Company
- Num. of stores: 150+
- Num. of anchor tenants: 11
- Floor area: 1,570,160 square feet (145,873 m^{2}) (GLA)
- Floors: 1 (2 in JCPenney, Macy's, and Woody Williams Center for Advanced Learning and Careers)
- Website: huntingtonmall.com

Huntington Mall is an enclosed shopping mall in the village of Barboursville in Cabell County in the U.S. state of West Virginia. The largest mall in West Virginia, it features more than 150 retailers. Anchor stores include Dick's Sporting Goods, JCPenney, Macy's, TJ Maxx, HomeGoods, a Cinemark theater, and Woody Williams Center for Advanced Learning and Careers which is a trade school. Other major tenants include Books-A-Million and Old Navy. The mall is owned by Cafaro Company of Youngstown, Ohio.

== History ==
Lazarus opened on February 5, 1981, two weeks before the mall itself opened on February 18. It is located 12 miles (19 km) east of downtown near Interstate 64.

Initially, Lazarus, Stone & Thomas, Sears, and JCPenney, which opened in April 1981, were the anchor stores. When the Foot Locker store opened, Bobby Riggs made an appearance, challenging mall employees to a game of tennis. Phar-Mor, a discount pharmacy chain, was later added to the mall as its fifth anchor in 1990.

Stone & Thomas was converted to Elder-Beerman in 1998 when the chain was acquired. A year later, Borders Books & Music opened its first West Virginia store at the mall. Old Navy, Steve & Barry's and local chain Dawahares were later added to the mall as well. After Phar-Mor closed in 2002, the location became the second Dick's Sporting Goods in the state.

In 2009, Cinemark opened a new movie theater at the mall, replacing the vacated six-screen complex that closed in 2006 and what had been Morrison's Cafeteria. Borders closed in 2011, due to the company's bankruptcy and was replaced by Books-A-Million. The Bon-Ton closed Elder-Beerman in 2016, and the space was split among Forever 21, TJ Maxx, and HomeGoods.

Sears closed its store in 2019, as did Forever 21.

Dave & Buster's moved into the mall in 2024, at the prior Fun City location.

Woody Williams Center for Advanced Learning and Careers is now located on both floors of the former Sears.

== Impact ==
Huntington Mall is the largest mall in West Virginia. When it was built, the only other businesses nearby were two bars and a gas station. Since the mall's opening, several retailers have been built around the mall, including four motels, several restaurants, a Walmart Supercenter, the first Best Buy in West Virginia, and Sheetz. Huntington Mall averages $375 million in retail trade.
