= Governor's Square Mall =

Governor's Square Mall may refer to:

- Governor's Square in Tallahassee, Florida
- Governor's Square (Clarksville, Tennessee)
