= Roshek's =

- Roshek Brothers Department Store
- U.S. National Register of Historic Places
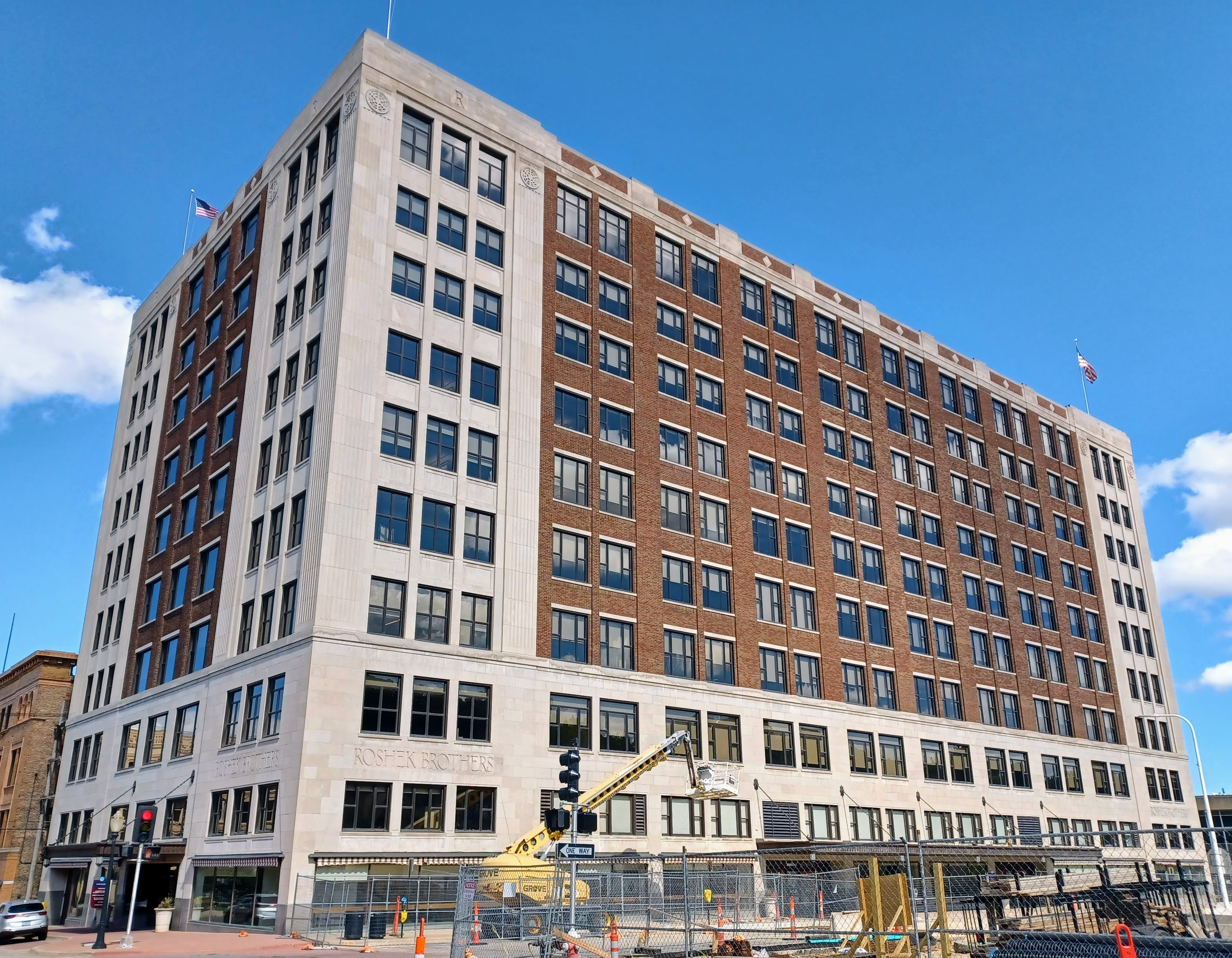

- Location within Iowa Location within the United States
- Location: 250 W. 8th St. Dubuque, Iowa
- Coordinates: 42°30′1″N 90°40′8″W
- Built: 1929-1932
- Architect: Charles Wheeler Nicol; William Lewis Yokum
- Architectural style: Beaux Arts; Art Deco
- NRHP reference No.: 10000076
- Added to NRHP: March 17, 2010

Roshek Brothers Department Store was a large retail store in downtown Dubuque, Iowa, United States. The company was founded by J.J.and F.H. Roshek. In its prime, Roshek's was the primary shopping destination in Dubuque and was the largest department store in the state of Iowa. The building has been listed on the National Register of Historic Places.

== History ==
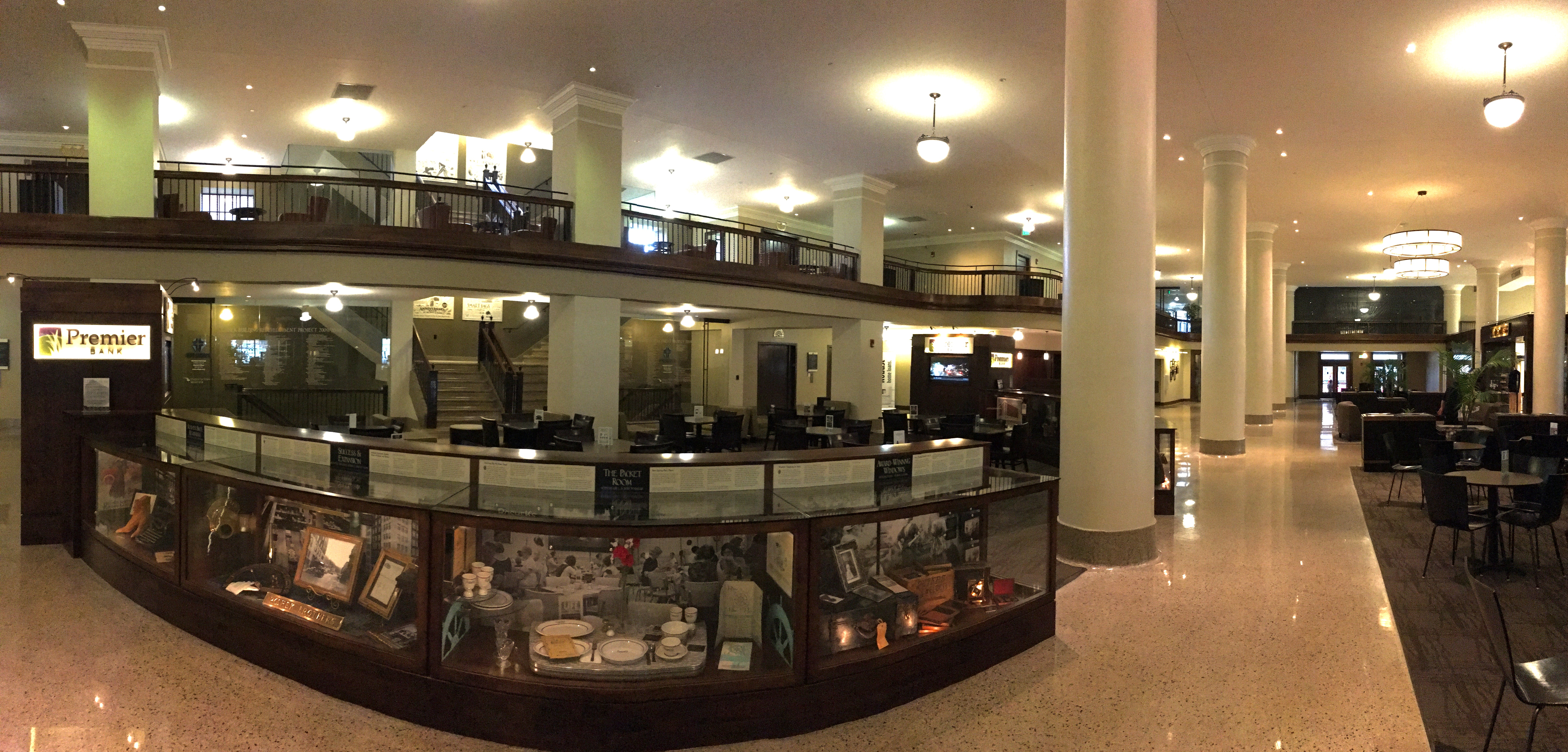
Interior of Roshek's, July, 2016

Roshek's operated for more than 40 years in a 9-story building at 700 Locust Street in Dubuque. The building was built in two halves beginning in August 1929. Originally the whole building was to be finished within a year, but as of the fall of 1931, only the north half was finished. Wholly completed in 1932, the building is a block long and half a block wide and is the tallest building in Dubuque. It replaced two four-story buildings, the former Rider-Wallis dry goods building, located on the south half of the same block (demolished to complete this building), and a smaller four-story Roshek building across the alley immediately east, which was located on the southwest corner of Eighth and Main streets, which was later occupied by Montgomery Ward. The building's architect was Charles Wheeler Nicol (1888–1953), a noted regional designer of major hotels and school buildings. This was and remains the state's largest building to be used as a department store.

Other department stores were also located downtown. In the 1960s, prior to the construction of Kennedy Mall, Stampfer's was on the northeast corner of Eighth and Main streets. J.C. Penney was on the west side of Main Street, just north of Stampfer's.

In the 1960s Roshek's decided to move their operations to smaller quarters at Kennedy Mall, a regional shopping center on the western edge of the city. Roshek's became one of the mall's anchor tenants, along with Montgomery Ward and Younkers, a Des Moines department store which made its first appearance in Dubuque when the mall was built. The new Roshek's store opened in 1970. The Roshek family subsequently sold the store to Gamble-Skogmo, Inc. The store closed in 1982. Today what was originally Roshek's space in the mall was occupied by two other department stores, Sears and Younkers.

After Roshek's moved from downtown, the former department store was converted into an office building. For most of the time since conversion, it has been known as the Dubuque Building, except for a period of several years when it was called CyCare Plaza. It is now called The Roshek Building.

On January 15, 2009, IBM announced that it would move into the building, creating a new technology service center with 1,300 employees after improving the building to make it a LEED-certified building. The building was placed on the National Register of Historic Places on March 17, 2010.
