= Ashtabula Towne Square =

- Interior of Ashtabula Towne Square in November, 2026
- Location: Ashtabula, Ohio, United States
- Coordinates: 41.882015°N 80.756142°W
- Address: 3315 N. Ridge East, Unit #700
- Opened: 1992
- Previous names: Ashtabula Mall
- Developer: Cafaro Company
- Owner: Sure Fire Group, LLC
- Num. of stores: 25 (space for 70)
- Num. of anchor tenants: 8 (All 8 vacant as of 2021)
- Floor area: 1,074,470 square feet (99,822 m^{2})
- Floors: 1

Ashtabula Towne Square, formerly Ashtabula Mall, is an enclosed shopping mall serving the city of Ashtabula, Ohio, United States. It has the capacity for 70 stores as well as a food court. The mall has six vacant anchors last occupied by Sears, Steve & Barry's, Super Kmart, JCPenney, Dillard's, and Dillard's Home. The mall has a gross leasable area of 1,074,470 sq ft (99,822 m^{2}).

== History ==
Ashtabula Towne Square opened in 1992 as Ashtabula Mall. The mall featured Dillard's, JCPenney, Kmart (later expanded into a Super Kmart), Phar-Mor, Carlisle's, and Sears as anchor stores. The Kmart and Phar-Mor stores were both prototypes, with the latter also being that chain's 300th store. While Sears and Phar-Mor opened in August of that year, the mall itself did not open until the fall. Carlisle's closed in 1994 with the chain's demise and was later converted to a Dillard's Home Store.

Phar-Mor closed in the mid-late 1990s. Steve & Barry's replaced Phar-Mor in 2005. Also, Dillard's closed the Home Store to focus on fashion apparel but ended up also closing its main location in 2007.

The mall was purchased from the original developers, Cafaro Company, by Cabot Investment Properties in 2007 for $44.4 million and renamed the Ashtabula Towne Square in 2008. Since the mall's renaming, several more stores have closed, including Old Navy, Spencer's Gifts, Claire's, Fashion Bug, Lane Bryant, Payless ShoeSource, Wendy's, GameStop, Mr. Hero, and J.B. Robinson Jewelers. Ruby Tuesday also closed its Ashtabula Mall location in March 2008, followed by Steve & Barry's in October. Finish Line, Inc., King's Jewelers, and Zales have also closed since early 2009, and Waldenbooks closed in early 2010.

Bank of America foreclosed on Cabot Investment Properties, then owners of the mall, in 2011. In 2011 and 2012 lawsuits were filed against Cabot by investors asserting fraud. Sears closed in 2012

In October 2014 local investment group Sure Fire Group, LLC purchased the mall from Morgan Stanley Capital I Inc. for $6.1 million. Morgan Stanley Capital I bought the property from a receivership.

Kmart closed in 2016, which made JCPenney and Dunham's Sports the last anchors to be occupied at the time.

Ashtabula Towne Square and its attached properties were sold in February 2020 by Sure Fire Group, LLC to Ashtabula Mall Realty Holding LLC (Kohan Retail Investment Group) for $10.2 million.

On June 4, 2020, JCPenney announced that it would close by around October 2020 as part of a plan to close 154 stores nationwide. After JCPenney closed, Dunham's Sports was the one and only anchor store left, and also closed in 2021.

The AMC Classic 6-screen movie theater closed on July 20, 2023.

On August 23, 2023, Sure Fire Group, LLC, bought back the mall for $2.5 million from Kohan Retail Investment.
