= Fort Saginaw Mall =

- 1960s image of Fort Saginaw Mall
- Location: Buena Vista Charter Township, Michigan, United States
- Coordinates: 43°24′59″N 83°53′54″W
- Address: 3235 Holland Road
- Opened: December 2, 1966
- Closed: March 7, 1995
- Developer: Cafaro Company
- Owner: Buena Vista Township
- Num. of anchor tenants: 3
- Floor area: 378,266 square feet (35,142.1 m^{2})
- Floors: 1

Fort Saginaw Mall was an enclosed shopping mall located in Buena Vista Township, just outside the city of Saginaw, Michigan, United States. Opened in 1966, it served as Saginaw's only enclosed mall until Fashion Square Mall opened on the other end of town in 1972. Fort Saginaw Mall had become a dead mall by the 1980s, as many of its stores had closed. By the end of the 1990s, the entire mall was closed off, except for an attached Kmart which remained open until May 2004.

The vacant mall was owned by Cafaro Company of Youngstown, Ohio long after its closure. Although the community had made plans to demolish it, Cafaro initially refused to sell to the charter township. However, in April 2008, the township has claimed title to the abandoned building, and announced plans to redevelop it.

== History ==
Fort Saginaw Mall opened in Buena Vista Township, a charter township just outside the city limits of Saginaw, Michigan, on December 2, 1966. It was an L-shaped enclosed mall, comprising an eastern and southern wing. Federal's, a department store based in Detroit, Michigan, served as the eastern anchor store; at the southern end, but not accessible from the mall concourse itself, was a Kmart discount store with adjacent Kmart Foods supermarket. A five-and-dime store called Scott's 5 & 10, as well as a small movie theater, were also located in the southern wing, and overall, the mall comprised forty stores at its peak. It was the only mall in Saginaw until Fashion Square Mall opened in 1972, on the north end of town.

In 1982, the mall began facing increased vacancy. As a result, Cafaro Company renamed the complex Fort Saginaw Outlet Mall and began adding outlet stores. Coinciding with this renaming, the interior was renovated, and the eastern anchor, after having operated as Robert Hall Village and Consumer Outlet Mart for a short period, was tenanted by Burlington Coat Factory.

By the 1990s, the mall had become increasingly vacant. The property closed entirely on March 7, 1995, due to a sprinkler problem, except for Kmart. In 2001, Kmart proposed to demolish the abandoned mall property in favor of a new store, but these plans were canceled when the chain filed for bankruptcy.

== Demolition of 2009 ==
In 2007, Buena Vista Charter Township officials made plans to buy the property from Cafaro Company for $2 million; Cafaro, however, refused to sell the mall, as they had plans to redevelop it. In April 2008, Buena Vista Charter Township successfully purchased the property, and may later redevelop it for various uses. The township has also kept a Burger King restaurant in the mall's parking lot, as well as a strip mall behind the mall (which includes a Save-A-Lot grocery store), thus making both properties tenants of the township. Demolition began in November 2009.
