= Caffaro =

Caffaro may refer to:

- Caffaro (river), a river in north Italy
- Caffaro di Rustico da Caschifellone (c.1080–c.1164), a Genoan crusader and chronicler
- Agustín Caffaro (born 1995), Argentine basketballer
- Francisco Caffaro (born 2000), Argentine basketballer

== See also ==
- Cafaro, a surname
