= Charleston Town Center =

Shopping mall in West Virginia

- Charleston Town Center, August 2023
- Location: Charleston, West Virginia, United States
- Coordinates: 38°21′18″N 81°38′21″W
- Opened: November 1983; 43 years ago
- Closed: 2027 (planned; enclosed mall only)
- Developer: Forest City Enterprises and The Cafaro Company
- Manager: Hull Property Group
- Owner: Hull Property Group
- Architect: RTKL Associates
- Num. of stores: 27
- Num. of anchor tenants: 2 (1 open, 1 vacant, formerly 4; other 2 demolished)
- Floor area: 933,979 sq ft (86,769.5 m^{2}) (GLA)
- Floors: 2 plus partial third level
- Parking: 4,000+
- Website: charlestontowncenter.com

Charleston Town Center is an enclosed shopping mall in downtown Charleston, West Virginia. One of the largest enclosed malls in the United States to be located in a downtown shopping district, it has comprised more than 130 tenants on two levels at its peak, in addition to food court on a partial third level. As of September 2026, there are 13 stores still operating there. In October 2026, it was announced that the mall will be closing for indoor shopping by the summer of 2027. Several vacancies in later years have led to conversion of large portions into office space. Popular full-service restaurants include Chili's Bar & Grill, and Outback Steakhouse. The last remaining anchor store was JCPenney, which closed in May 2025. The mall is owned by Hull Property Group.

== History ==
=== Opening, early history, and tenant changes: 1983-2009 ===
Charleston Town Center opened in 1983 in downtown Charleston as the largest downtown-based shopping mall located east of the Mississippi River. Co-developed by the Ohio-based Forest City Enterprises and Cafaro Company, the mall included four anchor stores when it opened; JCPenney, Sears, Kaufmann's and Montgomery Ward. The Montgomery Ward closed as part of its chain's bankruptcy and liquidation in 2001. In 2002, plans were announced to renovate the mall. Under these plans, Dillard's (which, at the time, had no locations in West Virginia) would have opened in the former Montgomery Ward space. In return, the Dillard's chain asked for a $1-a-year lease as part of an incentive package, in addition to asking for $7.5 million in city loans. However, the plans for a Dillard's at the mall were later canceled, and the former Montgomery Ward remained dark, although a portion of the space was converted to a Steve & Barry's clothing store in 2002.

On February 7, 2004, McDonald's and Long John Silver's closed in the mall. In 2005, the retail bookstore chain Books-A-Million expressed interest in replacing the former Montgomery Ward, although this store also never came to fruition. In January 2005, Olive Garden was closed. Finally, by 2006, it was announced that BrickStreet Insurance would locate its offices in the former Montgomery Ward space, and half of the food court was closed and converted into state government offices. A year later, Kaufmann's was converted to Macy's due to the acquisition of Kaufmann's then-parent company, May Department Stores. Steve & Barry's closed in September 2008 due to bankruptcy and the chain's liquidation; the space has since been divided between Rue21 and Rack Room Shoes. In 2009, Disney Store closed in the mall. In 2011, television station WOWK sub-leased some unused space in the BrickStreet area to relocate its TV studio.

=== Decline, anchor closures, and financial problems: 2010-present ===
On December 28, 2016, Sears announced that it would be closing in April 2017 as part of a plan to close 150 stores nationwide, leaving JCPenney and Macy's as the only anchors left.

The extent of the mall's financial problems was slowly revealed in late 2017. The nature and amount of Macy's actual rent payment was disputed by local politicians, with some stated that it actually was staying rent-free. Finally on January 12, 2018, the Circuit Court of Kanawha County placed the mall in receivership and appointed CBRE Group as its receiver. The mall was scheduled to be sold at auction on the Charleston courthouse steps on January 24, 2019, however the bank holding the largest note, U.S. Bancorp, was the only bidder.

On May 8, 2018, it was announced that the former Sears would be demolished for a freestanding Hilton-branded hotel.

On April 2, 2019, Macy's closed, leaving JCPenney as the only remaining department store anchor. In July 2019, BrickStreet Insurance merged with Columbus, Ohio-based Motorists Insurance Group, with the combined company rebranding as Encova Mutual Insurance Group and retaining its Charleston offices. The Macy's anchor store was demolished in April 2024.

On January 27, 2025, it was announced that the JCPenney anchor store would close on May 25, leaving the mall without any anchor stores.

== Architecture and design ==
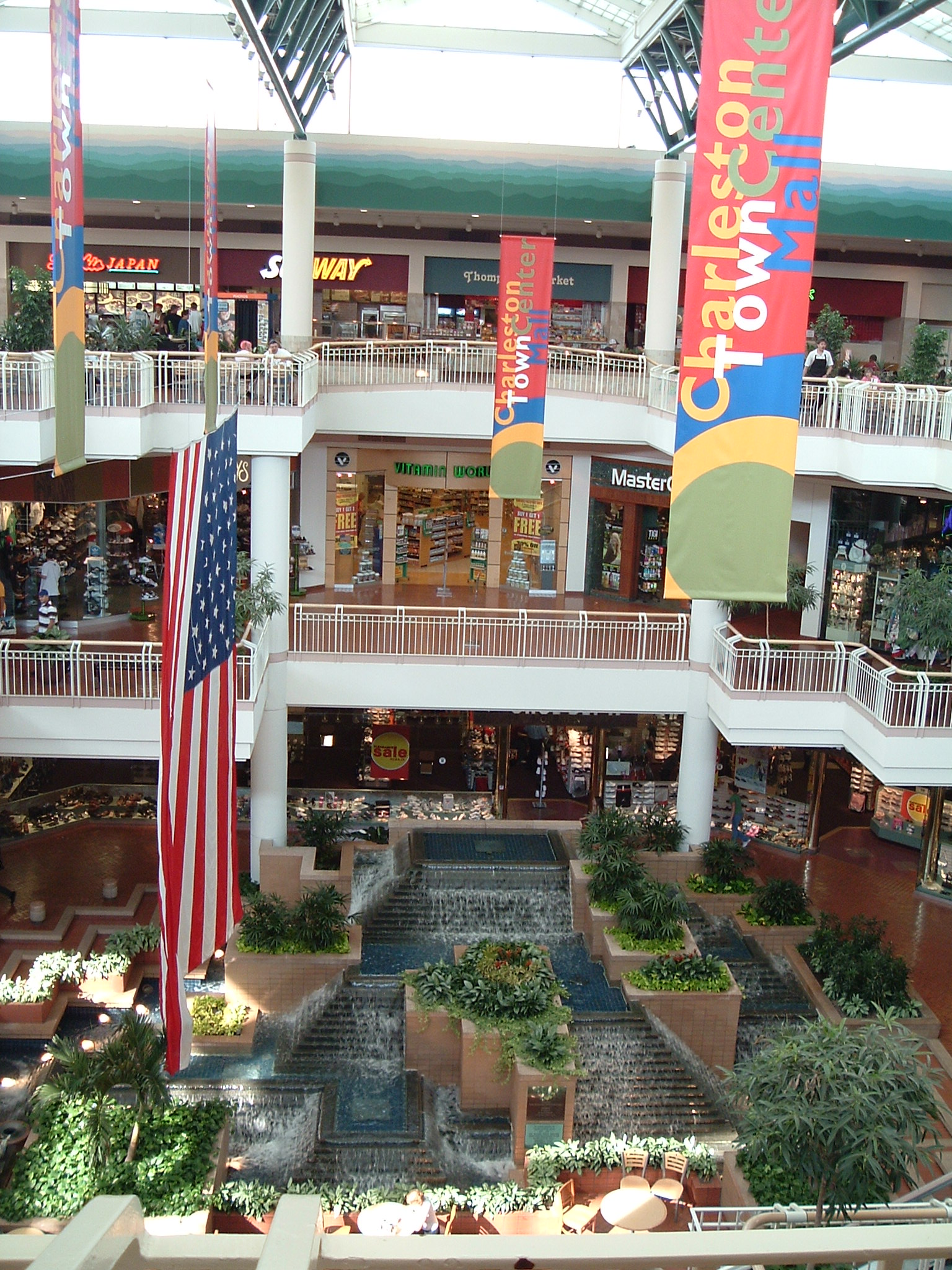
Central court with fountain (July 2006)

Charleston Town Center was designed by RTKL Associates, with architects from the firm's Dallas office responsible for the project. The enclosed shopping mall was built on a downtown block bordered by Court, Lee, Clendenin and Quarrier streets. The original design featured masonry-clad exterior walls, three levels of retail space and multilevel parking facilities around the complex.

The interior included brick-tiled corridors and skylights that allowed natural light into the building. A prominent feature was a three-story waterfall, which flowed over dark granite steps into a landscaped courtyard. The waterfall remained in place until 2005. The shopping center subsequently underwent renovations in 2003 and 2012.

A later renovation carried out by Graycor included the installation of new flooring in the common areas, improvements to existing restrooms and the construction of a new fountain in the central court. The work was completed while the shopping mall remained open to the public.

== Redevelopment and closure ==
In February 2025, Charleston mayor Amy Shuler Goodwin discussed the future of Charleston Town Center with Hull Property Group. She indicated that changes to the property were likely, although its future configuration had not been determined. The discussions concerned possible uses for the mall and adjacent properties, with retail expected to remain part of the site.

In May 2025, Goodwin suggested that the proposed Capital Sports Center, originally planned for the former Macy's site, could extend into part of the existing mall. This alternative was being considered amid rising construction expenses and uncertainty over federal funding, which had caused the project to be paused.

In September 2025, Matt Sutton, chief of staff to Goodwin, reported progress in discussions between city officials and Hull Property Group over the property's future. He suggested that the site could support new economic activity beyond its previous role as a shopping mall, but did not disclose specific plans or an agreement.

In January 2026, Charleston mayor Amy Shuler Goodwin revealed that the city was negotiating with Hull Property Group over a possible transfer of Charleston Town Center to municipal ownership. The city was considering redeveloping the property for residential, commercial and other uses, drawing inspiration from mall redevelopment projects elsewhere in the United States. Goodwin also proposed creating a development council and consulting residents about the site's future.

In February 2026, officials announced $7 million in federal funding for the proposed Capital Sports Center on the former Macy's site. Plans included indoor sports courts and fitness facilities, although the building's design could be revised if additional space within the mall property became available.

In October 2026, Hull Property Group announced plans to close Charleston Town Center's enclosed shopping area in late spring or early summer 2027, following a decline in the number of tenants. Restaurants with direct outdoor access were expected to remain in operation.

Following the end of negotiations between Charleston officials and Hull Property Group, Mayor Amy Shuler Goodwin reported that other parties were considering purchasing the property. However, Hull indicated that it was not seeking to sell the mall and had no redevelopment plans at that time.
