= Stone & Thomas =

Stone and Thomas
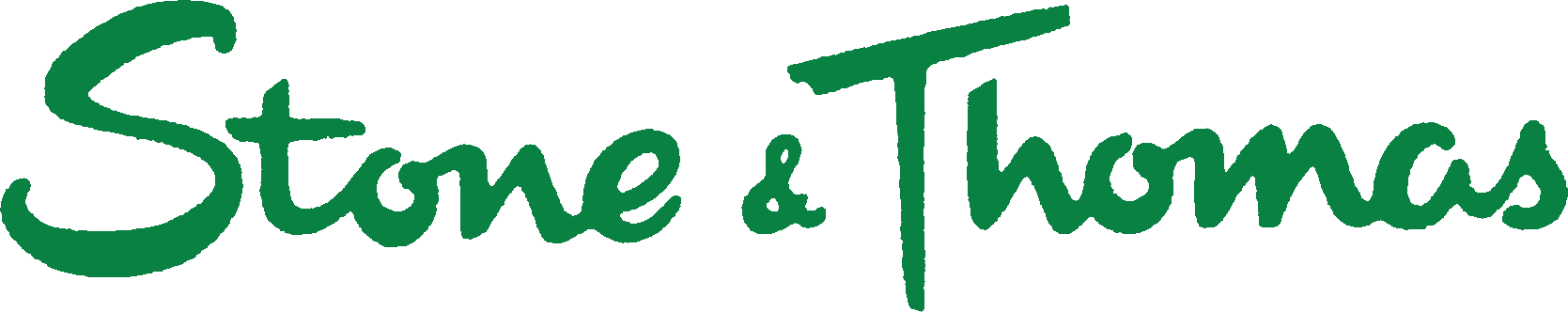
- Type: Department store
- Industry: Retail
- Founded: 1847; 179 years ago
- Defunct: 1998; 28 years ago
- Fate: Converted to Elder-Beerman; Few stores are sold to Belk and Peebles.
- Headquarters: Wheeling, West Virginia
- Products: Clothing, footwear, bedding, furniture, jewelry, beauty products, and housewares.
- Website: None

Stone & Thomas was a United States chain of department stores. Based in Wheeling, West Virginia, the chain had stores located in West Virginia, Virginia, Kentucky, Ohio, and Pennsylvania. The company was bought out in 1998 by Elder-Beerman, an Ohio-based chain of department stores.

== History ==
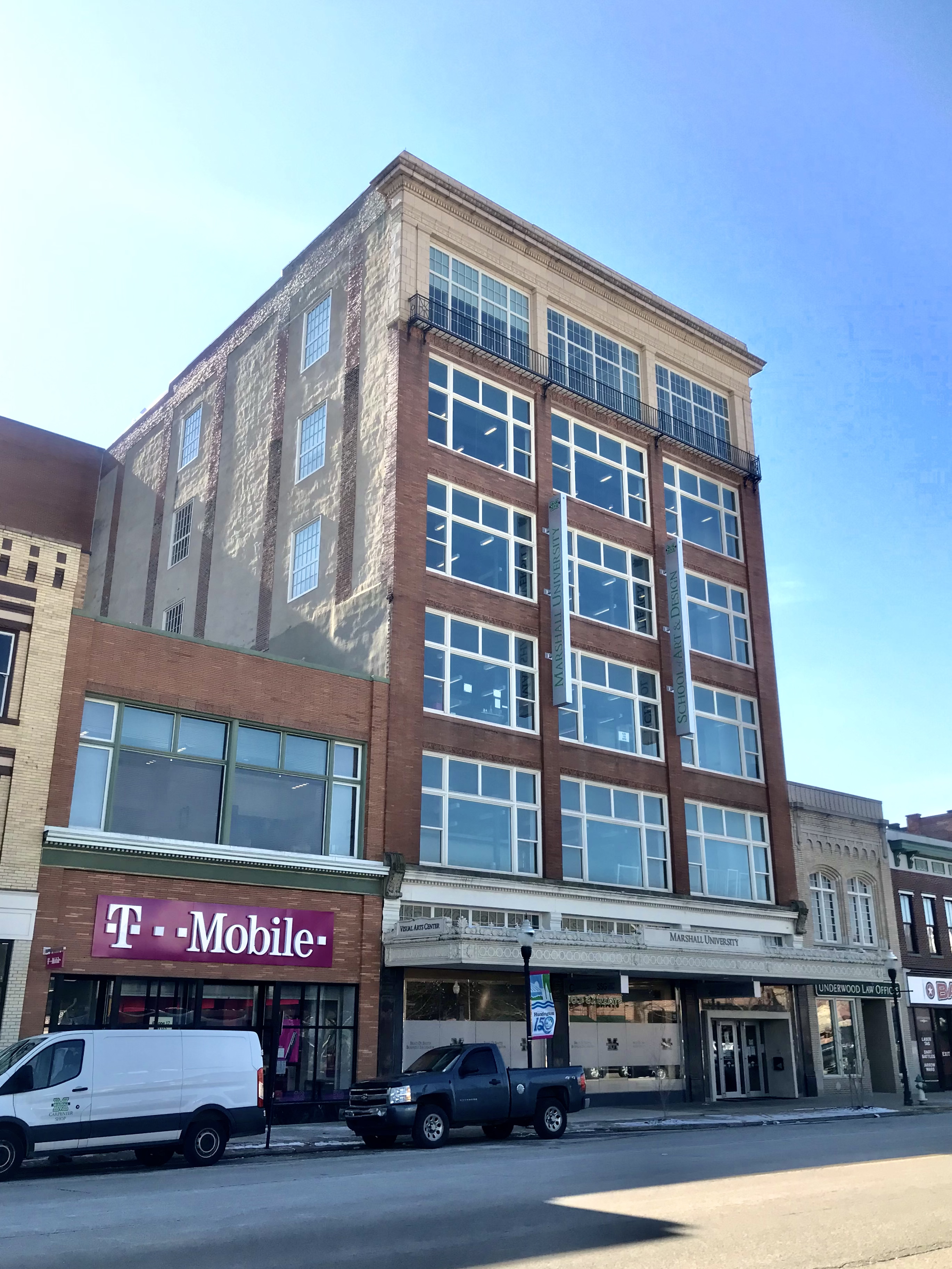
Former Huntington store now in use as the Marshall University Visual Arts Center.

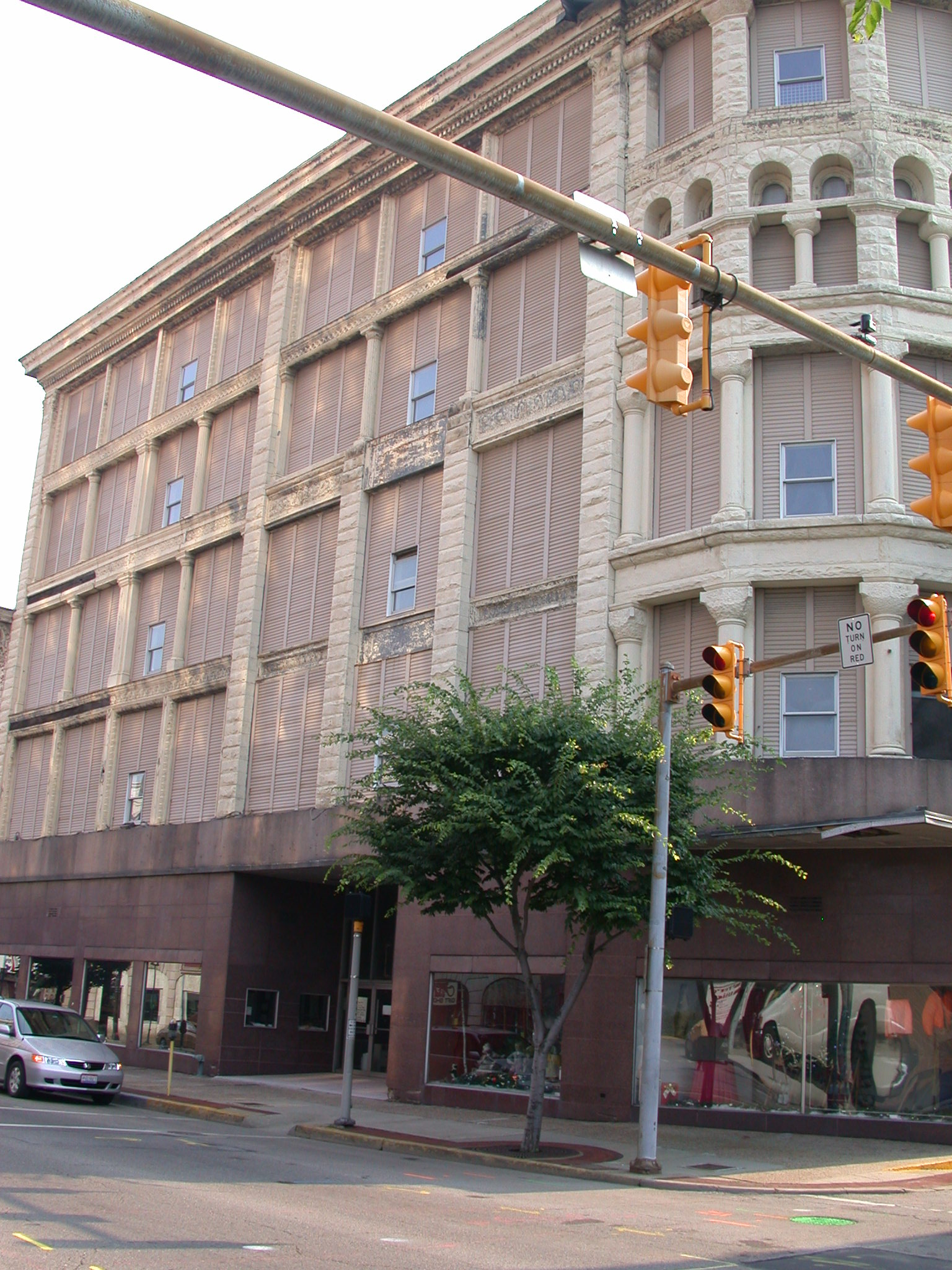
Vacant Wheeling flagship store in 2005.

Stone and Thomas was founded in 1847 in Wheeling, Virginia by Elijah J. Stone and Jacob C. Thomas. Also referred to as Stone's or "The People's Store", it was a West Virginia institution for 150 years. From its flagship store in downtown Wheeling, it expanded into Huntington in the 1910s, Charleston in 1928, and in most of West Virginia's major cities. In 1956 Stone and Thomas bought out Broida's of Parkersburg, and for a short time it was called Broida's, Stone & Thomas. The chain grew to 19 stores in West Virginia, two in Virginia, one store in Ashland, Kentucky and one store in St Clairsville, Ohio.

Stone's was a very teenager-friendly store. It sponsored high school fashion shows, held tea parties, and had a Stone-agers program for teens. Throughout the 1990s, the company wanted to focus more on its suburban stores and closed several of the older downtown stores in Huntington and Clarksburg.

Classic logo

In 1998 falling profits forced Stone & Thomas to sell itself to Elder-Beerman for $38 million (~$68 million in 2024). All existing Stone & Thomas stores were converted to Elder-Beerman by 1999. Six locations were sold to Peebles and three more locations were sold to Belk. After moving to a larger location, the Stone & Thomas anchor store at the Ohio Valley Mall, was also converted, while the former location subsequently became a Burlington Coat Factory, then Steve & Barry's University Sportswear, and finally, Crafts 2000. The Huntington store was purchased by Marshall University and transformed into the college's Department of Art & Design, for students of the applied arts. The university's art department moved into the building and opened September 18, 2014. The downtown Wheeling store is currently being used to hold the offices of Williams Lea Group on the Main Street side and a Urgent Care Center and apartment buildings on the Market Street side.

The downtown Charleston store, built in 1948, has remained vacant since the location moved to the Charleston Town Center mall in 1997. On November 15, 2019, BridgeValley Community and Technical College announced that it would explore purchasing the Charleston building to renovate for use as its Kanawha Valley campus.
