= Spotsylvania Towne Centre =

Coordinates: 38°17′30.4″N 77°30′46.1″W

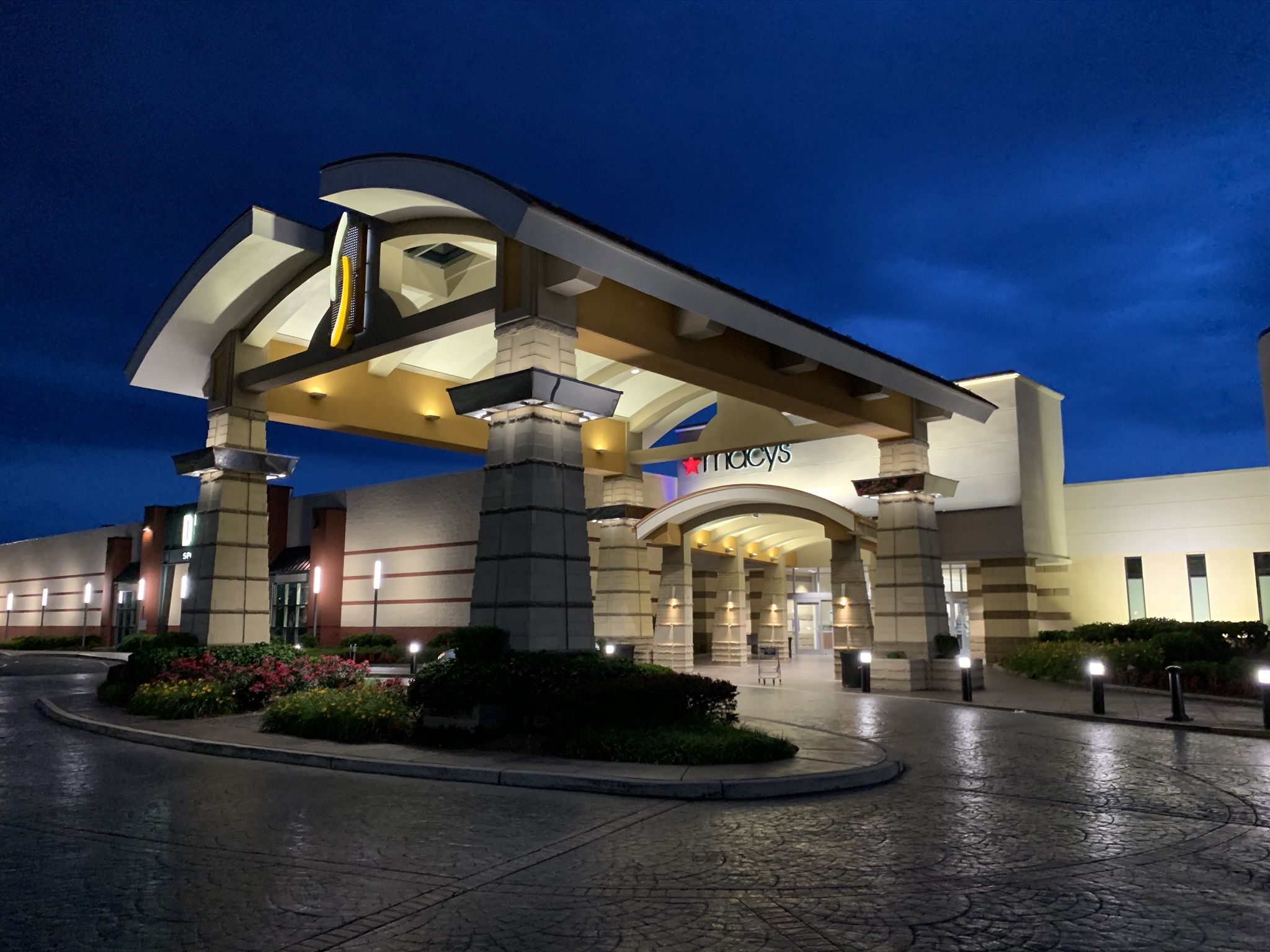
- Main entrance and motor lobby
- Location: Fredericksburg, Virginia, United States
- Opened: 1980
- Manager: Cafaro Company
- Owner: Cafaro Company
- Num. of stores: 152
- Num. of anchor tenants: 7 (6 open, 1 demolished)
- Floor area: 1,325,000 square feet (123,100 m^{2})
- Floors: 1
- Website: spotsylvaniatownecentre.com

The Spotsylvania Towne Centre (formerly Spotsylvania Mall) is a mall located in Spotsylvania County, Virginia, on Virginia State Route 3, less than a mile west of Interstate 95, and directly across from the Central Park shopping and dining complex. The mall is owned and developed by Cafaro Company. The property was renamed as "Spotsylvania Towne Centre" at the beginning of a $12 million renovation project. The project, completed in 2009, included an extensive remodeling of the mall's interior and exterior. At the same time, construction was begun on an outdoor lifestyle center called "The Village." The mall's anchor stores are Guitar Center, Dick's Sporting Goods, Belk, Costco, JCPenney, and Macy's. Hooky Entertainment, located behind the main portion of the mall, connects a bowling alley with a movie theater. The mall also houses over 150 specialty stores and restaurants.

== History ==
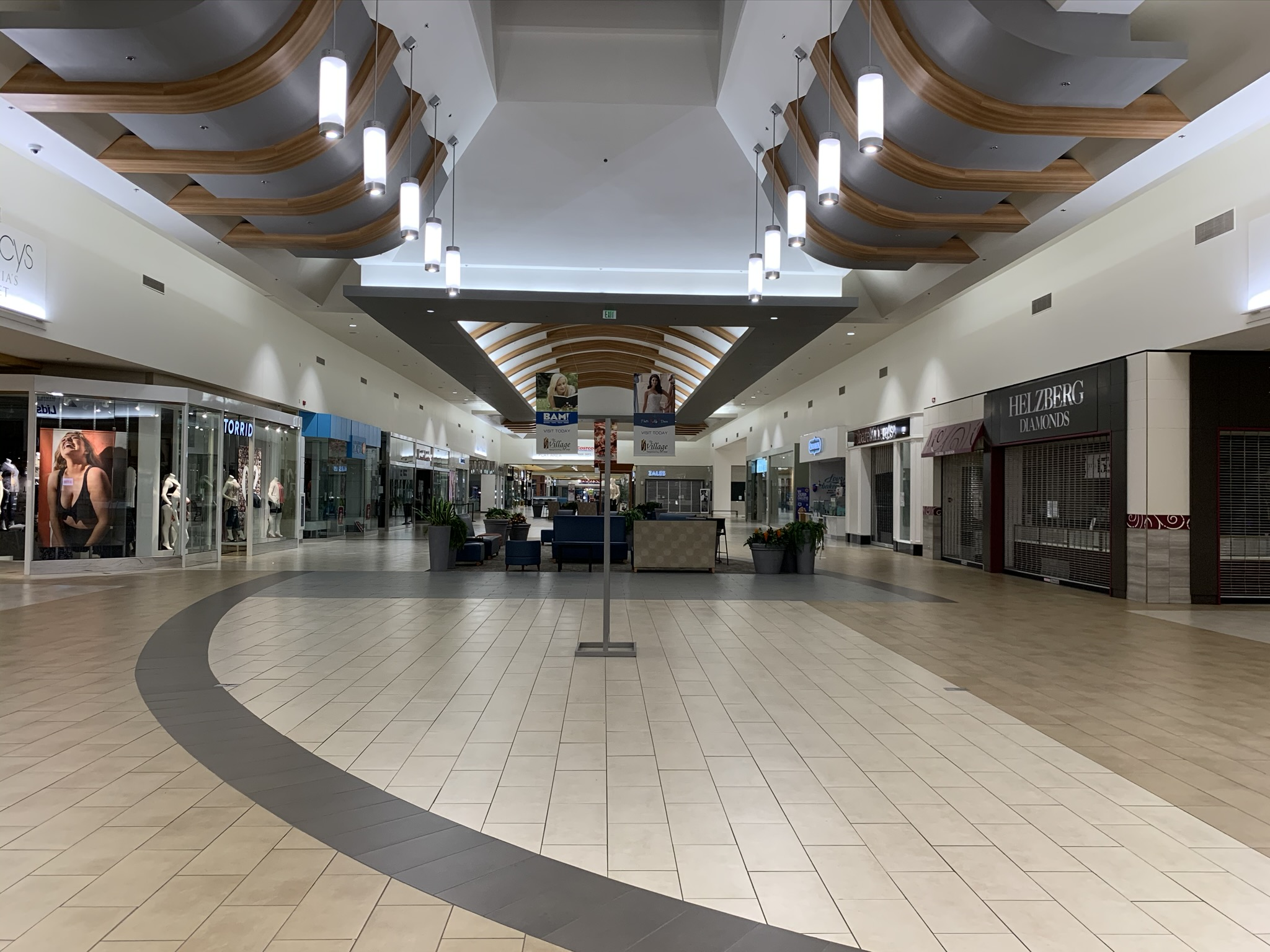
Main corridor in the Spotsylvania Towne Centre.

Spotsylvania Mall opened in 1980 with Leggett (now Belk), JCPenney, Sears, and Montgomery Ward as its anchor stores, as well as an F.W. Woolworth Company dime store as a junior anchor. Hecht's was added in 1993, the same year in which Woolworth closed. JCPenney opened an auxiliary store in the former Woolworth space. Montgomery Ward closed in 2001 and was demolished to make way for a Costco a year later. A Dick's Sporting Goods was also added in 2002. On November 7, 2019, it was announced that Sears would be closing this location a part of a plan to close 96 stores nationwide. The store closed on February 2, 2020, It was subsequently demolished in October 2020 to make way for Attain at Towne Center luxury apartments.

== The Village ==
Coincidentally with the remodeling of the mall, Cafaro announced plans to develop 200,000 square feet (19,000 m^{2}) of outdoor retail space on vacant land adjoining Spotsylvania Towne Center. On October 22, 2008, Cafaro announced that eight tenants had signed agreements to lease space in The Village.

Development plans for The Village included the Muviville Entertainment Complex which will feature a "theater, bowling alley, restaurant and electronic gaming complex". While the movie theater was part of early plans for The Village, its construction appeared doubtful when, in 2009 the developer, Muvico Theaters, was unable to make payments on a $55 Million debt. The center has since been open as Hooky Entertainment Fredericksburg, combining a 16-lane bowling alley with a 12-screen movie theater.
