= Sandusky Mall =

Shopping mall in Ohio, U.S.

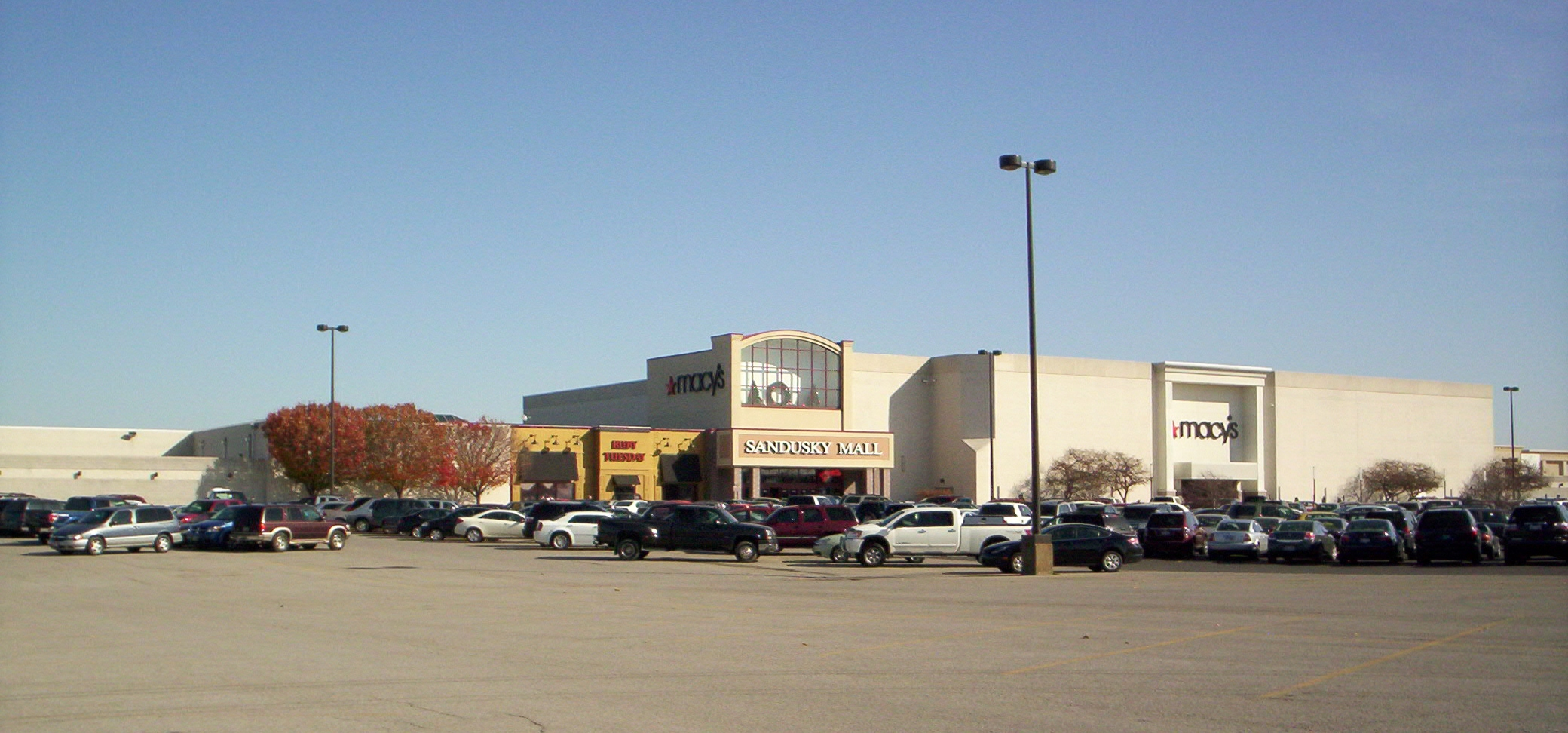
- Location: Perkins Township, Ohio
- Coordinates: 41°25′06″N 82°40′09″W
- Opened: March 16,1977
- Developer: Cafaro Company
- Manager: Cafaro Company
- Owner: Cafaro Company
- Num. of stores: 60+
- Num. of anchor tenants: 7
- Floor area: 750,000 square feet (70,000 m^{2})
- Floors: 1
- Parking: Uncovered parking lot
- Public transit: Sandusky Transit System
- Website: sandusky-mall.com

Sandusky Mall is an indoor shopping center located in Perkins Township, south of Sandusky, Ohio. It is located on the east side of US Route 250, north of I-80/I-90 (Ohio Turnpike) and Ohio State Route 2. It is the only major shopping center within 45 miles (72 km). It comprises more than 70 stores; the anchor stores are TJMaxx, JCPenney, Books-A-Million, Dewey Furniture, Tilt Studios, and Ross. It is owned and operated by the Cafaro Company.

== History ==
Mall construction began in 1976 and Sandusky Mall opened on March 16, 1977. The Mall opened with about 50 stores including 2 anchors Montgomery Ward and JCPenney. May Co. and Cohn Co. opened soon after the official grand opening. Sears took over the former Montgomery Ward in 1986. In the outdoor section, Child World closed in 1992 and was later converted to OfficeMax in 1994. The May Co. rebranded their store at the Sandusky Mall as Kaufmann's in the mid-1990s.

On November 7, 2003, a Best Buy store opened outside the mall. In 2006, the Kaufmann's was converted to Macy's, when May Department Stores Company and Federated Department Stores merged into Macy's. Borders opened in 2005. TJ Maxx was added in 2009. Borders closed in 2011 being replaced a few months later by BAM! Books.

On April 7, 2016, Sears announced that its store would be closing in June 2016. On January 4, 2017, Macy's announced that its store would also be closing as part of a plan to close 100 stores nationwide over the next several years. The store closed in March 2017. In December 2017, Charming Charlie, located between the former Macy's and Sears, closed due to their bankruptcy filing. In March 2018, the Ruby Tuesday restaurant at the front of the mall shuttered its location. On April 18, 2018, it was announced that Elder-Beerman would be closing all of their stores after the parent company, Bon-Ton, filed for bankruptcy. The store closed late August 2018.

In December 2018, Cafaro Company announced that they had a redevelopment plan set in place for the mall with changes on the horizon coming within the next year. On June 30, 2019, it was announced that Hobby Lobby, a crafts and home decor store, would be coming to the Sandusky Mall. It replaced roughly half of the former Sears store. It opened March 23, 2020.

The mall complex is being transformed into a mixed-used property to feature retail, residential, entertainment, and office space. Changes are currently underway. Stores that relocated to other portions of the mall from the Sears wing included Spencer's, Nail World, and Ritaz Parlor to make way for the new mall redevelopment. In October 2020, Shoe Dept. Encore moved into a newly renovated space in Center Court from its old location adjacent to American Eagle.

It was announced on December 17, 2020, that T.J. Maxx would open in their new location, inside the mall, sometime in 2021. Five Below will also open near Hobby Lobby in 2021 in a portion of the former Macy's. Another Broken Egg Cafe would open at the mall in 2021 near Cheers Sports Bar and Grill. More changes will be coming as well. The mall will also get a new entrance in the south corridor near American Eagle. The remaining space left in the former Elder Beerman will be transformed into a mixed use area for business.

On May 30, 2021, Five Below held its soft opening and opened to the public for its grand opening on June 4, 2021. On October 21, 2021, T.J. Maxx opened its new store at Sandusky Mall, adding to the department store lineup at Sandusky Mall. On October 30, 2022, Ross Dress for Less opened a new store at the Sandusky Mall. In February 2024, it was announced that Tilt Studios would open in the former Elder Beerman. The opening date was delayed, with Tilt Studio eventually opened on December 7, 2024.
