= Ohio Valley Mall =

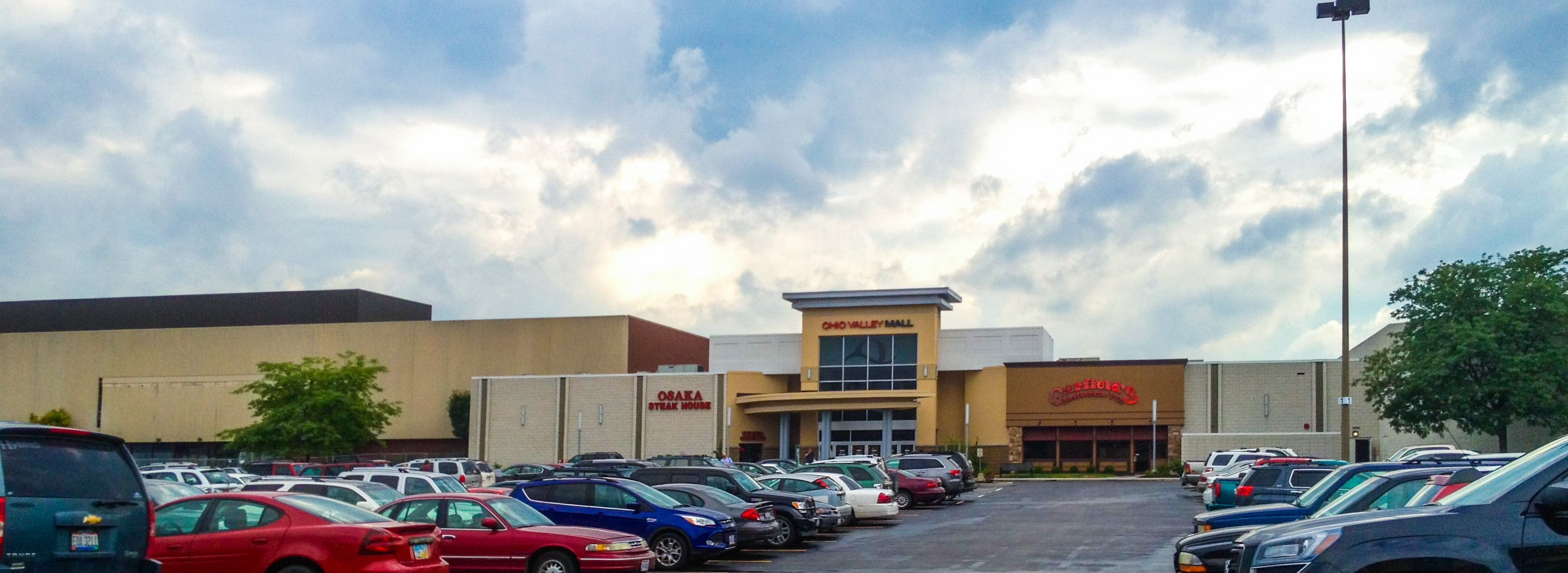
- Exterior view of Ohio Valley Mall, July 2013
- Location: Richland Township, Ohio, United States
- Coordinates: 40°04′07″N 80°52′05″W
- Opened: October 4, 1978; 48 years ago
- Developer: Cafaro Company
- Owner: Cafaro Company
- Num. of stores: 70+
- Num. of anchor tenants: 7 (6 open, 1 vacant)
- Floor area: 1,200,000 sq ft (110,000 m^{2})
- Floors: 1 (2 in Boscov's)
- Website: ohiovalleymall.net

Ohio Valley Mall is a single-story enclosed shopping mall in Richland Township, outside St. Clairsville, Ohio. It opened in 1978 and was developed by the Youngstown, Ohio-based Cafaro Company, which continues to own and manage it. The mall has six open anchor stores, which are Academy Sports + Outdoors, Boscov's, Burlington, Dunham's Sports, Marshalls, and Michaels, and one vacant anchor store, which was once Macy's. It contains more than 70 stores and services.

== History ==
The Ohio Valley Mall opened on October 4, 1978. The mall opened with five anchor stores, which were JCPenney, Kaufmann's, L.S. Good, Montgomery Ward, and Sears. Cinemette Theatres opened in July 1979. L.S. Good closed in March 1982 and Stone & Thomas opened in its space that summer. Montgomery Ward closed in April 1983 and was replaced by Kmart, which opened that November.

In January 1988, Cinemette Theatres was converted to Cinema World. Cinema World was converted to Carmike Cinemas in April 1994. In 1996, Stone & Thomas relocated into a larger location within the mall, occupying two separate store spaces. Burlington Coat Factory opened in 1997 in the space formerly occupied by Stone & Thomas.

Following the conversion of Stone & Thomas to Elder-Beerman in October 1998, the spaces were divided into separate stores: the Elder-Beerman Men’s & Home store and the Elder-Beerman Women’s & Children’s store. Burlington Coat Factory closed in 2001 and Steve & Barry's opened in its space in 2004. In September 2006, Kaufmann's was converted to Macy's.

JCPenney moved to Triadelphia, West Virginia, in 2007, and was replaced by Levin Furniture, which opened in 2009. It was announced in September 2008 that Steve & Barry's would be closing in November due to bankruptcy. Crafts 2000 opened in the former Steve & Barry's in 2009. In 2012, it was announced that the Cafaro Company planned to renovate the mall's interior to add a new anchor store. Levin Furniture closed in 2012 and it was announced in February 2013 that Boscov's would be opening in its space that October.

Crafts 2000 closed in 2015 and was replaced by Pat Catan's, which opened later that year. In January 2017, it was announced that Elder-Beerman and Kmart would be closing in March. Carmike Cinemas was converted to AMC Theatres in March 2017. It was announced in March 2017 that the former Elder-Beerman Men’s & Home store would be subdivided and renovated for Marshalls, which opened that September. In October 2017, it was announced that the former Elder-Beerman Women’s & Children’s store would be subdivided and renovated for Tilt Studio, which opened in March 2018.

It was announced in January 2019 that Pat Catan's would be closing in June due to Michaels announcing that it would be converting the store in August. In March 2019, it was announced that half of the former Kmart would be subdivided and renovated for Dunham's Sports, which opened that October, while the other half of the former Kmart would be demolished for Hampton Inn & Suites, which opened in April 2021. It was announced in April 2019 that Sears would be closing in July. The former Sears was used by Spirit Halloween on a seasonal basis from 2019 to 2024.

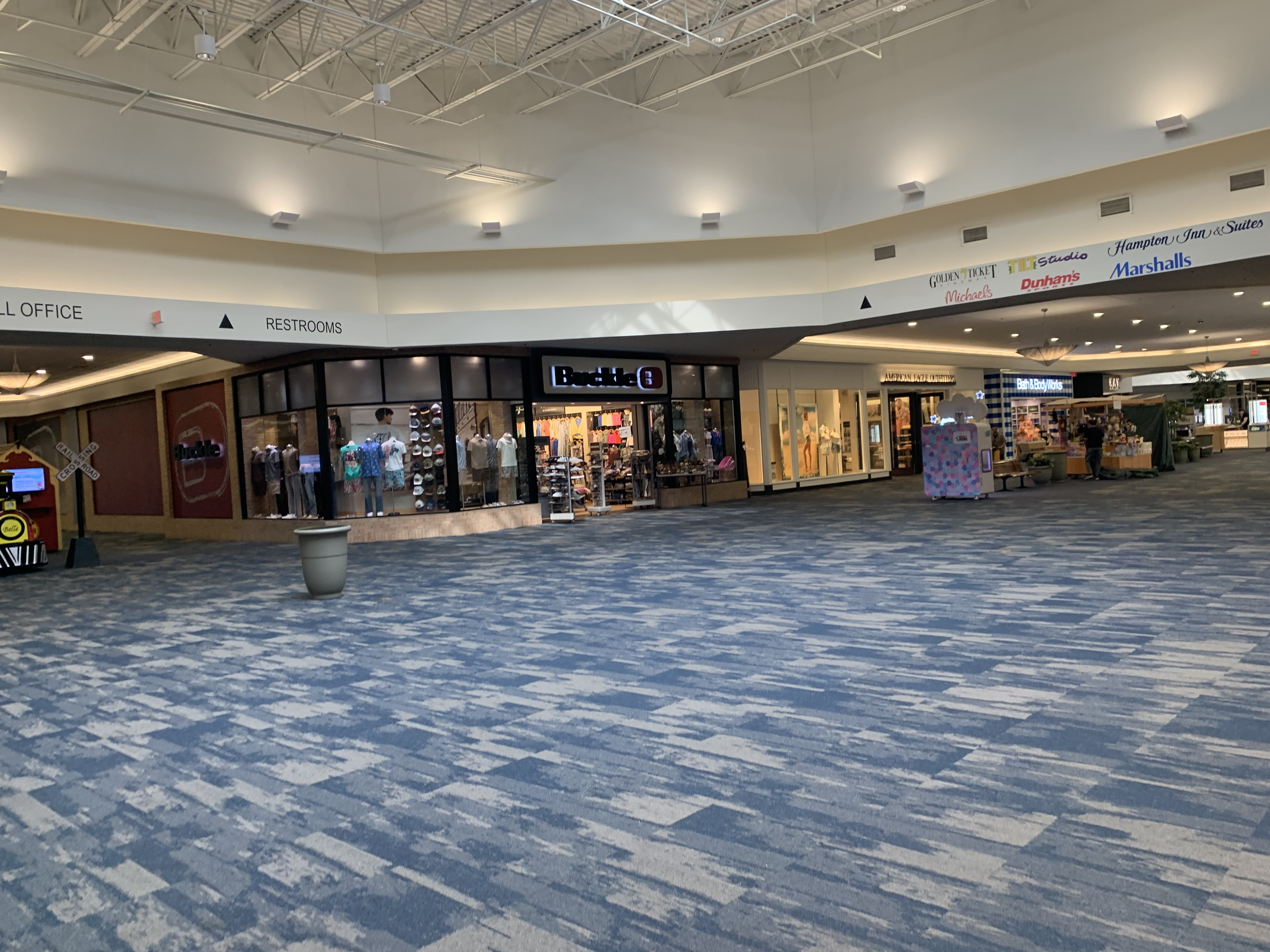
Interior of Ohio Valley Mall, April 2026

In January 2020, it was announced that Macy's would be closing in March as part of a plan to close 125 stores nationwide. It was announced in February 2020 that the remaining exterior-facing portion of the former Kmart would be renovated for Five Below, which opened that June. From February to May 2021, the former Sears was used as a COVID-19 vaccination clinic. The former Sears was also used by Hickory Farms during the Christmas and holiday season in 2021.

AMC Theatres closed in September 2024 and in April 2025, it was announced that Golden Ticket Cinemas would be opening in its space that November. Angels All Star Cheerleading opened in the remaining interior-facing portion of the former Elder-Beerman Men’s & Home store in September 2025. Also in September 2025, it was announced that an exterior-facing portion of the former Macy's would be renovated for Boot Barn, which opened in March 2026. It was also announced in September 2025 that the former Sears would be subdivided and renovated for Burlington, which opened in May 2026, and Academy Sports + Outdoors, which opened in August 2026.
