= Hazelton (Youngstown, Ohio) =

Neighborhood in Youngstown, Ohio, United States

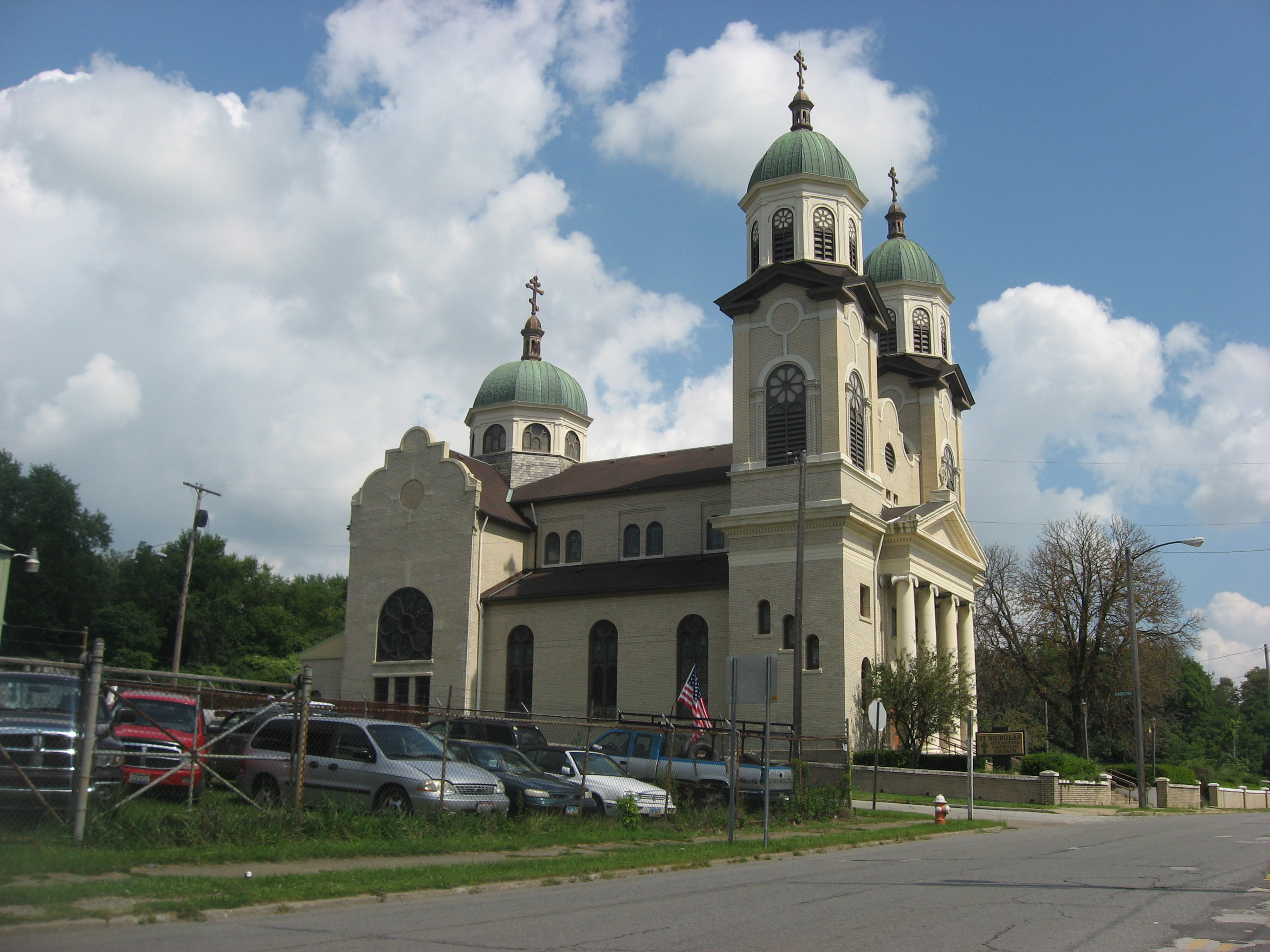
- St. Nicholas Byzantine Catholic Church
- Interactive map of Hazelton
- Coordinates: 41.0836695°N 80.6178515°W
- Country: United States
- State: Ohio
- County: Mahoning
- City: Youngstown
- Elevation: 261 m (856 ft)

Hazelton (also spelled Haselton) is a neighborhood in Youngstown, Ohio, located on the city's east side. It is bordered by the cities of Struthers and Campbell. In the early 20th century, the neighborhood was alternately referred to as "the East End".

== Origins ==
Hazelton overlooked the many blast furnaces that operated along the banks of the Mahoning River. These included the Haselton Iron Works Mill and Republic Steel's Youngstown mill. Today, the vacant remains of some of these plants can still be seen along the river.

The neighborhood was originally named after the Haseltine family, who owned land. The neighborhood was renamed by later inhabitants who favored a name that made the neighborhood seem like a town. Hazelton's population expanded with the growth of the mills, and it became the home of thousands of immigrants from England, Germany, Ireland, Italy, and Eastern Europe. The neighborhood's African-American population grew steadily in the post-World War II era.

== Post-industrial decline ==
Hazelton, with its brick streets, neo-Gothic churches, and family-owned businesses, retained a strong ethnic flavor long after many of the city's residential areas became rather homogeneous. The area became increasingly depressed and depopulated as the local steel industry fell into decline. Yet, those who pass through the area can still glimpse the shells of former steel-manufacturing plants.

The neighborhood retains a number of well-known landmarks, including Immaculate Conception Church, one of the oldest surviving Roman Catholic parishes in the city, and Saint Nicholas Byzantine Catholic Church, a symbol of the area's Eastern European population.

== Notable residents ==
- Frank J. Battisti – Judge, U.S. District Court for the Northern District of Ohio (1961–1994); best known for rulings on Cleveland's school desegregation case.
- William M. Cafaro – developer, pioneer in construction of strip malls and enclosed malls, including the Eastwood Mall.
