= Central Park (shopping complex) =

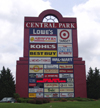
- Location: Fredericksburg, Virginia, United States
- Coordinates: 38°18′18.7″N 77°30′33.7″W
- Opened: 1995
- Owner: Silver Companies
- Num. of stores: 166
- Num. of anchor tenants: 7+
- Website: shopatcentralpark.com

Central Park is a shopping complex in Fredericksburg, Virginia, with 166 businesses. The complex is located near the intersection of Interstate 95 and State Route 3. Many national big-box stores, restaurants, and smaller local businesses occupy the Central Park complex. The complex has 2,200,000 square feet (200,000 m^{2}) of leased retail space. The complex's developer, Silver Companies, describes Central Park as "The East Coast's Largest Power Retail Center". In the 2004 rankings from the American Studies Department at Eastern Connecticut State University, Central Park was ranked as the largest unenclosed mall (and the second largest mall) on the East Coast, and as the seventh largest mall in the United States.

== Tenants ==
The many retail anchors of Central Park include Walmart, Target, Lowe's, Kohl's, Best Buy, Barnes & Noble, Hobby Lobby, Ashley Furniture Industries, Old Navy, Pottery Barn outlet, DSW, Office Depot, East Coast Appliance Source, and PetSmart. Former anchors include H. H. Gregg, Borders, Shoppers, Toys R Us, Buy Buy Baby, and Sports Authority.

Central Park also includes a Homewood Suites by Hilton, Hilton Garden Inn, and a Hampton Inn & Suites with one more hotel scheduled to open in the next few years. In 2020 the Fredericksburg Nationals (formerly known as the Potomac Nationals) relocated to a new stadium constructed next to the Fredericksburg Expo & Conference Center. In late January 2006, the Fredericksburg Expo & Conference Center opened, giving the Fredericksburg region its first convention center. Central Park is also home to Central Park Funland, a small family fun park consisting of indoor/outdoor entertainment. Outdoor attractions consist of go karts, batting cages, and mini golf, while the indoor area offers an array of activities, to include laser tag, mini bowling games, a rollercoaster simulator and hundreds of arcade games and small children's rides. Fun Land also hosts children's birthday parties, and group rates for corporate, church or sporting event gatherings, with private event rooms to accommodate. A large megachurch, Lifepoint, is also has its main campus located across from Fun Land.

== History ==
Central Park was developed by Silver Companies. (Carl D. Silver Parkway, the primary road through Central Park, is named after the founder and owner of the Silver Companies.) Before the complex was developed, the site was occupied by a Sheraton Hotel and a golf course. The complex opened in 1995, and is still expanding and growing. Central Park is now a 310-acre (1.3 km^{2}) power center. It serves as the retail shopping and primary dining component of the 2,400-acre (10 km^{2}) mega-development Celebrate Virginia, which uses the slogan "North America's Largest Retail Resort" and spans Stafford County, the Rappahannock River, and the City of Fredericksburg. Across Route 3 from Central Park is the older Spotsylvania Mall, which has undergone extensive renovation to become the Spotsylvania Towne Centre.

In June 2020, Chuck E. Cheese announced that this location will be permanently closed as a part of a plan to close 34 locations nationwide due to bankruptcy. However in July 2021, it reopened.

On January 10, 2023, it was announced that buybuyBABY would be closing as part of a plan to close 62 stores nationwide from its parent company, Bed Bath & Beyond.

== Criticism ==
Many area residents complain that the developers did not make adequate allowances for the increase in traffic caused by the complex. Residents and travelers in the area are often frustrated by the congestion along the Route 3 corridor near the Interstate 95 interchange.

== See also ==
- List of largest shopping malls in the United States
