= Capri Cafaro =

American politician

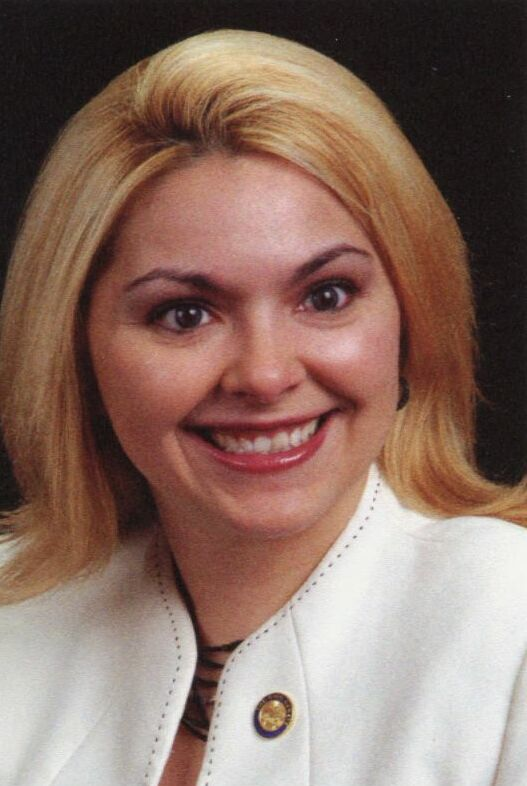
- Official portrait, 2007

Ohio Senate Minority Leader
- In office January 5, 2009 – January 7, 2013
- Preceded by: Ray Miller
- Succeeded by: Eric Kearney

Member of the Ohio Senate from the 32nd district
- In office January 2, 2007 – December 31, 2016
- Preceded by: Marc Dann
- Succeeded by: Sean O'Brien

Personal details
- Born: November 21, 1977 (age 48) Youngstown, Ohio, U.S.
- Party: Democratic
- Parent: John J. Cafaro (father)
- Relatives: William M. Cafaro (grandfather)
- Education: Stanford University (BA); Georgetown University (MALS)
- Profession: Legislator

Capri Silvestri Cafaro (born November 21, 1977) is an American television personality and former politician. A member of the Democratic Party, she represented Ohio's 32nd senatorial district in the Ohio Senate from 2007 to 2016 and was the minority leader from 2009 to 2012. Her district included all of Trumbull and Ashtabula counties, and portions of Geauga County. Since leaving office, Cafaro has appeared as a contributor on Fox News Channel, primarily as a semi-regular co-host of the afternoon talk show Outnumbered.

== Early life and education ==
Cafaro was born in Youngstown, Ohio, and raised in the nearby suburb of Liberty Township. Her father is shopping mall developer John J. Cafaro. Her grandfather was developer William M. Cafaro. She is of Italian descent.

Cafaro attended Youngstown private schools and graduated from Ursuline High School. She received a bachelor's degree in American studies from Stanford University in 1997 and a Master of Arts in Liberal Studies degree in international studies from Georgetown University in 2001.

== Early career ==
Cafaro served on the Trumbull County Senior Services Advisory Council and was a state policy liaison for Ohio with the National Patient Advocate Foundation. She was also a state advocate representative for the National Committee to Preserve Social Security and Medicare, and served as a councilor for the Medicare Rights Center. Cafaro has also acted as an economic policy associate for Global Action on Aging, an NGO with consultative status at the United Nations.

As a political novice, Cafaro won a surprise victory in the 2004 Democratic primary for Ohio's 14th congressional district, topping a five-candidate field, which included 2002 nominee Dale V. Blanchard, columnist Herb Hammer, U.S. Marine Charles L. Wolfe, and Ohio state representative Ed Jerse (who received the endorsement of the Akron Beacon Journal). Cafaro polled 54% of the vote, while Jerse, the second-place finisher, managed 19%. In the general election, however, she lost to Republican Steve LaTourette.

Cafaro again ran for the Democratic nomination for the open Ohio's 13th congressional district in 2006, placing second in a nine-candidate primary, behind Betty Sutton. That seat was vacated by U.S. representative Sherrod Brown, a Democrat who would successfully run for U.S. senate in the same cycle.

== Ohio Senate (2007–2016) ==
In 2007, Cafaro was appointed to the 32nd District of the Ohio Senate to replace Marc Dann after Dann won the Ohio attorney general's race on November 7, 2006. One year after becoming a member of the Ohio General Assembly, Cafaro secured a leadership position as the assistant minority whip for the Senate Democrats.

In 2008, Cafaro was elected to her first full term after running unopposed in the general election. Soon after, she was elected by her colleagues as minority leader of the 128th General Assembly. She again served as minority leader in the 129th General Assembly. Cafaro served as leader for three years until she stepped down and was replaced in 2012 as Ohio Senate minority leader by Senator Eric Kearney. She won a second full term to her Senate seat in the 2012 general election, defeating Republican Nancy McArthur 67% to 33%.

Cafaro played a prominent role in the Medicaid expansion efforts in Ohio, and has sought to codify the expansion permanently in Ohio law. She has offered legislation numerous times to do so.

Cafaro did not seek reelection to the Ohio State Senate in 2016 due to term limits. As of 2017, Cafaro was the executive-in-residence at American University's School of Public Affairs and gave commentary on political events as a contributor on Fox News.

== Election history ==
Ohio Senate 32nd District: Results 2008 to 2012
Year	Democrat	Votes	Pct	Republican	Votes	Pct
2008	Capri Cafaro	106,178	100.00%			
2012	Capri Cafaro	96,426	66.95%	Nancy McArthur	47,611	33.05%

== See also ==
- Ohio's 14th congressional district
