= Kentucky Oaks Mall =

Coordinates: 37.07884°N 88.68876°W

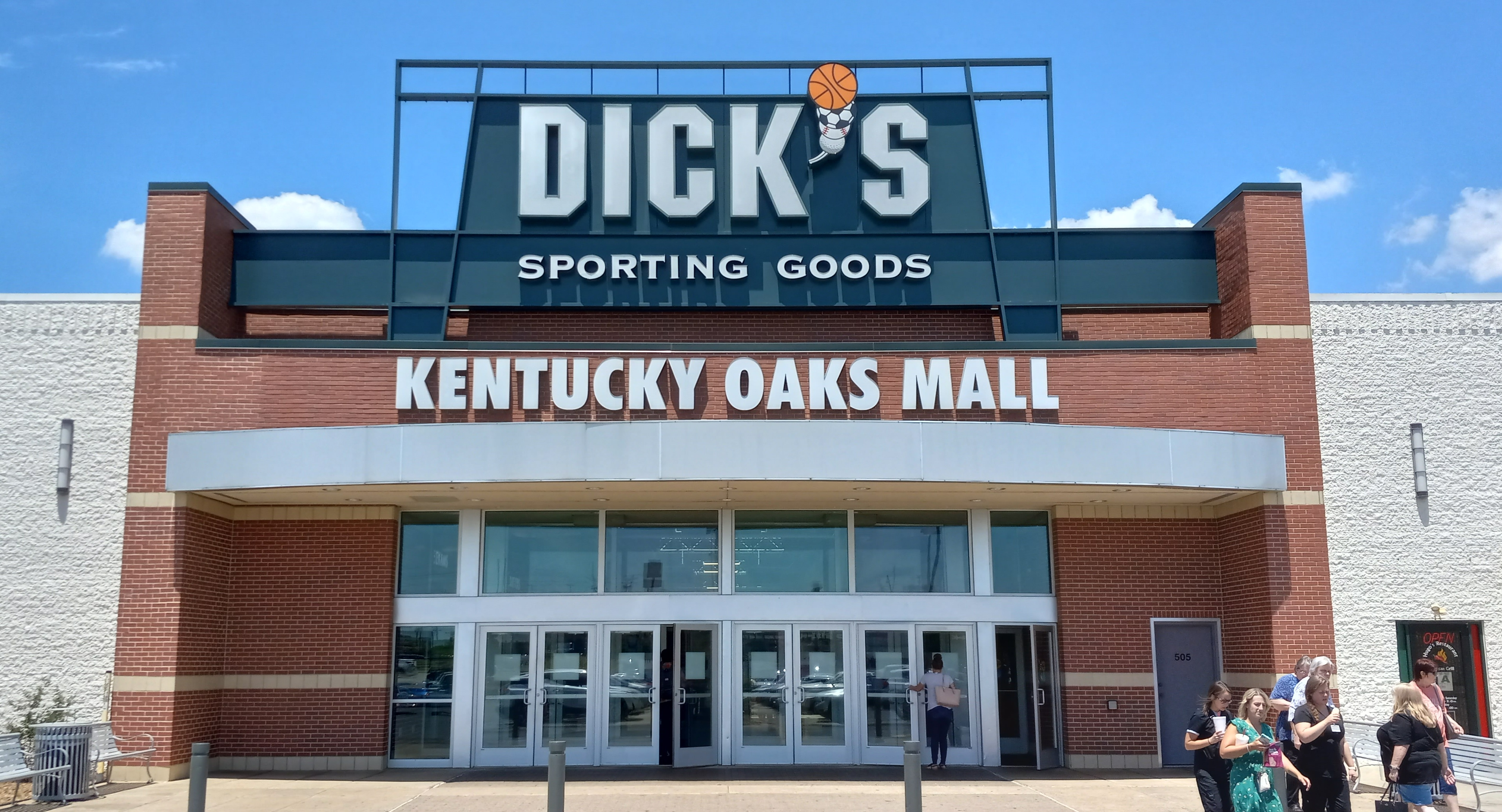
- Entrance to Kentucky Oaks Mall, June 2022
- Location: Paducah, Kentucky, United States
- Address: 5101 Hinkleville Road
- Opened: 1982
- Developer: Cafaro Company
- Manager: Cafaro Company
- Num. of stores: 100
- Num. of anchor tenants: 9
- Floor area: 1,300,000 square feet (120,000 m^{2}) (GLA)
- Floors: 1
- Public transit: Paducah Transit Authority

Kentucky Oaks Mall is an enclosed super-regional shopping mall in Paducah, Kentucky, United States. The mall was developed by the Cafaro Company, which owns and manages it. There are more than 100 stores. The anchor stores are Ross Dress for Less, Burlington, 2 Dillard's stores, HomeGoods, Best Buy, JCPenney, Dick's Sporting Goods, Sierra, and Vertical Jump Park. Other major tenants of the mall include H&M, Five Below, and Shoe Dept. Encore.

== History ==
Kentucky Oaks Mall first opened in 1982 on U.S. Route 60 (Hinkleville Road) just west of Interstate 24. At the time, it had JCPenney, Sears, Ben Snyder's (later Hess's, now Dillard's), and Meis (which became Elder-Beerman in 1989) as its anchors. Venture added its first Kentucky location to the mall in 1989. The Venture store closed in 1998 and became Shopko in May 1999. In 2000, it was rumored that the mall would be sold to CBL & Associates Properties. Shopko remained in the mall for only two years, closing in 2001 along with several other stores, most of which were former Venture stores as well. Several big-box stores were added on the mall's periphery; a Walmart was opened in February 1983 and replaced with a Supercenter in 1992, and a prototype store for The Home Depot opened in 2002.

On March 8, 1994, Sam's Club opened north in the mall's surrounding area.

By 2003, K's Merchandise Mart had opened in the space vacated by Shopko. Best Buy and Old Navy were both added in mid-2004, with the former supplanting a former Ruby Tuesday restaurant.

K's Merchandise closed on November 7, 2006, with the chain's bankruptcy. The K's items were then liquidated by HPG Enterprises, which was closed only one month later after a judge forced it to close due to deceptive advertising. Despite the loss of this anchor store, the mall continued to gain tenants in 2006, including Hollister Co. and New York & Company. In November 2010, Dick's Sporting Goods opened in the space formerly occupied by K's Merchandise.

In 2015, Sears Holdings spun off 235 of its properties, including the Sears at Kentucky Oaks Mall, into Sertiage Growth Properties.

On December 27, 2016, Sears announced that its store would be closing as part of a plan to close 30 stores nationwide. The store closed on March 19, 2017. Elder-Beerman also closed in 2018 as parent company The Bon-Ton filed for bankruptcy. Cafaro Company announced in late 2018 a plan to redevelop the former Sears property for Burlington, Ross Dress for Less, and other smaller stores, and the former Elder-Beerman for Five Below and HomeGoods. As part of this redevelopment, H&M was also added to the mall.
