= Cafaro Company =

American owner of retail shopping centers

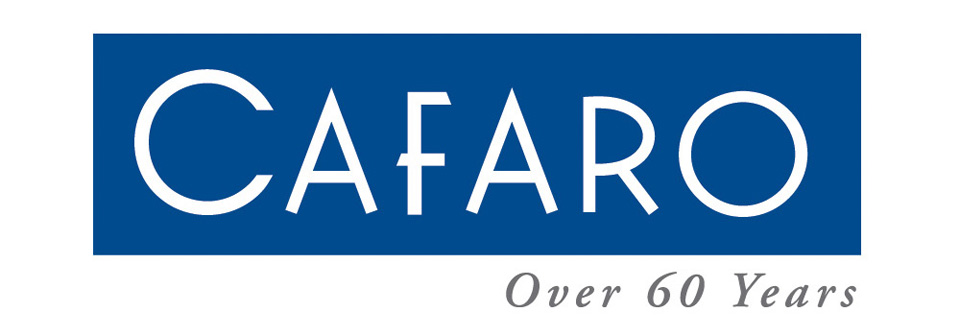
- Type: Private
- Industry: Retail
- Founded: 1949; 77 years ago
- Founders: William M. Cafaro; John A. Cafaro
- Headquarters: Niles, Ohio, U.S.
- Area served: United States
- Services: Property management Real estate development
- Website: cafarocompany.com

The Cafaro Company is an American property management and real estate development company headquartered in Niles, Ohio. It is the largest privately-owned shopping center development and management company in the U.S., managing more than 30,000,000 square feet (2,800,000 m^{2}) of commercial real estate throughout the country.

== History ==
Brothers William M. Cafaro and John A. Cafaro began developing grocery stores for Kroger in 1942. In 1949, they formed William M. Cafaro & Associates and expanded into shopping center development, opening a grocery plaza in Sharon, Pennsylvania, and another Kroger-anchored center in Barberton, Ohio. The brothers also managed the non-grocery tenants in the centers they developed.

The Cafaro Company opened its first enclosed regional shopping mall, American Mall in Lima, Ohio, in 1965. Eastwood Mall followed in 1969, and in 1970 the company developed Kennedy Mall, the first enclosed shopping mall in Iowa. During the 1970s and 1980s, Cafaro concentrated its regional mall development in Ohio, Michigan, Indiana, Pennsylvania, and West Virginia. As the company expanded, William Cafaro's sons assumed larger leadership roles: Anthony Cafaro Sr. became president in 1978, while John J. Cafaro, as executive vice president, helped develop Meadowbrook Mall and Ohio Valley Mall.

In 1988, Target Corporation asked the company to develop shopping centers for the retailer in the Pacific Northwest, expanding the company portfolio into Washington and Oregon and resulting in the establishment of an office in Puyallup, Washington. William M. Cafaro died in April 1998.

In the 2000s, the company diversified into sports and mixed-use development projects, including 7 17 Credit Union Field at Eastwood (formerly known as Cafaro Field and Eastwood Field) and major redevelopments at properties such as Millcreek Mall and Spotsylvania Towne Centre. In 2009, Anthony Cafaro Sr. and John J. Cafaro retired as president and executive vice president, respectively, and were succeeded by Anthony Cafaro Jr. and William A. Cafaro.

== Enclosed mall properties ==
Property Name	Location
Eastwood Mall	Niles, Ohio
Governor's Square Mall	Clarksville, Tennessee
Grand Central Mall	Vienna, West Virginia
Huntington Mall	Barboursville, West Virginia
Kennedy Mall	Dubuque, Iowa
Kentucky Oaks Mall	Paducah, Kentucky
The Mall of Monroe	Monroe, Michigan
Meadowbrook Mall	Bridgeport, West Virginia
Millcreek Mall	Erie, Pennsylvania
Ohio Valley Mall	St. Clairsville, Ohio
Sandusky Mall	Sandusky, Ohio
South Hill Mall	Puyallup, Washington
Spotsylvania Towne Centre	Fredericksburg, Virginia

== Former properties ==
Property Name	Location
American Mall	Lima, Ohio
Ashtabula Towne Square	Ashtabula, Ohio
Beaver Valley Mall	Monaca, Pennsylvania
Charleston Town Center	Charleston, West Virginia
Eastgate Plaza (formerly Eastgate Mall)	Wichita, Kansas
Five Points Mall (formerly North Park Mall)	Marion, Indiana
Fort Saginaw Mall	Saginaw, Michigan
Marion Centre (formerly Southland Mall)	Marion, Ohio
McGuffey Mall	Youngstown, Ohio
Southern Park Mall (co-developer)	Boardman, Ohio
Tallahassee Mall	Tallahassee, Florida
