= Governor's Square (Clarksville, Tennessee) =

Coordinates: 36.58810°N 87.28721°W

Governor's Square Mall
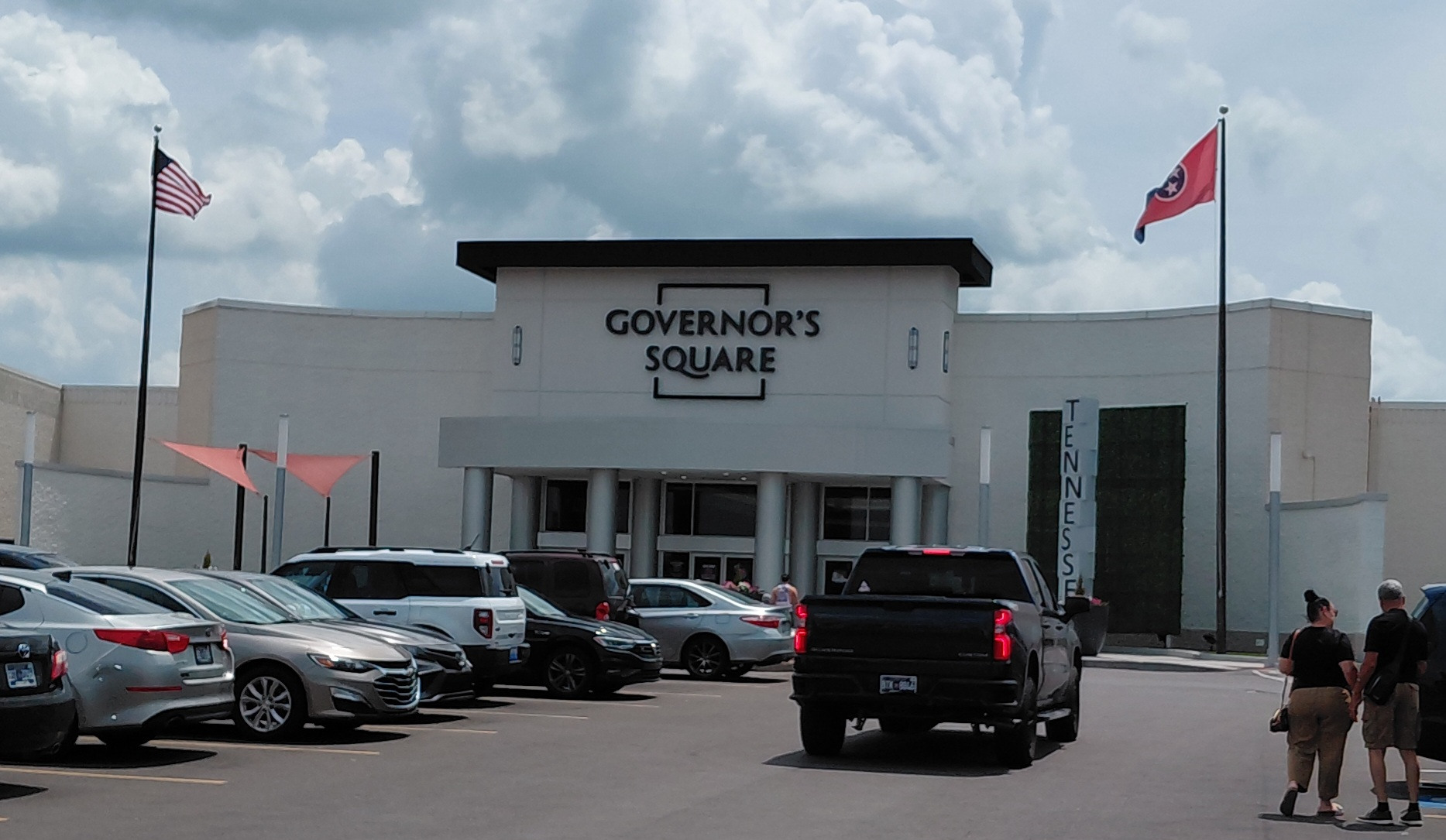
- Entrance to Governor's Square Mall, July 2025
- Location: Clarksville, Tennessee, U.S.
- Address: 2801 Wilma Rudolph Boulevard
- Opened: October 29, 1986
- Developer: CBL & Associates Properties and The Cafaro Company
- Manager: The Cafaro Company
- Owner: The Cafaro Company
- Num. of stores: 100+
- Num. of anchor tenants: 7 (6 open, 1 vacant)
- Floor area: 805,000 sq ft (74,800 m^{2})
- Floors: 1

Governor's Square Mall is an enclosed shopping mall in Clarksville, Tennessee, United States, serving the Clarksville metropolitan area. It is owned by the Cafaro Company. Its anchor stores are Burlington, Dick's Sporting Goods, Ross Dress For Less, JCPenney, Belk, Old Navy, and Dillard's. The mall contains over 100 stores and restaurants across 805,000 sq ft (74,800 m^{2}) of space.

== History ==
Plans for the mall were announced by the Youngstown, Ohio-based Cafaro Company in 1985, with an estimated construction cost of $40 million. Governor's Square Mall opened in October 1986, with a total cost of $50 million. At the time of its opening, the area around Exit 4 on Interstate 24 was largely undeveloped. The mall is now the center of the retail and commercial district for the Clarksville area. By August 1987, the mall had 66 tenants, with JCPenney, Sears, and Snyder's as the three anchor stores. Occupancy at the mall reached 92 percent by 1990, with a total of 98 stores.

In 1994, Dillard's announced plans to open a store at the Governor's Square Mall. An original anchor Snyder's (later Hess's) was split between Borders Books & Music and Goody's Family Clothing. After Goody's closed, it became Dick's Sporting Goods. A food court was also added. Borders closed in 2011 and became Ross Dress for Less in 2013.

On October 15, 2018, it was announced that Sears would be closing as part of a plan to close 142 stores nationwide. Burlington opened a store at the former Sears location in September 2021.
