= Meadowbrook Mall =

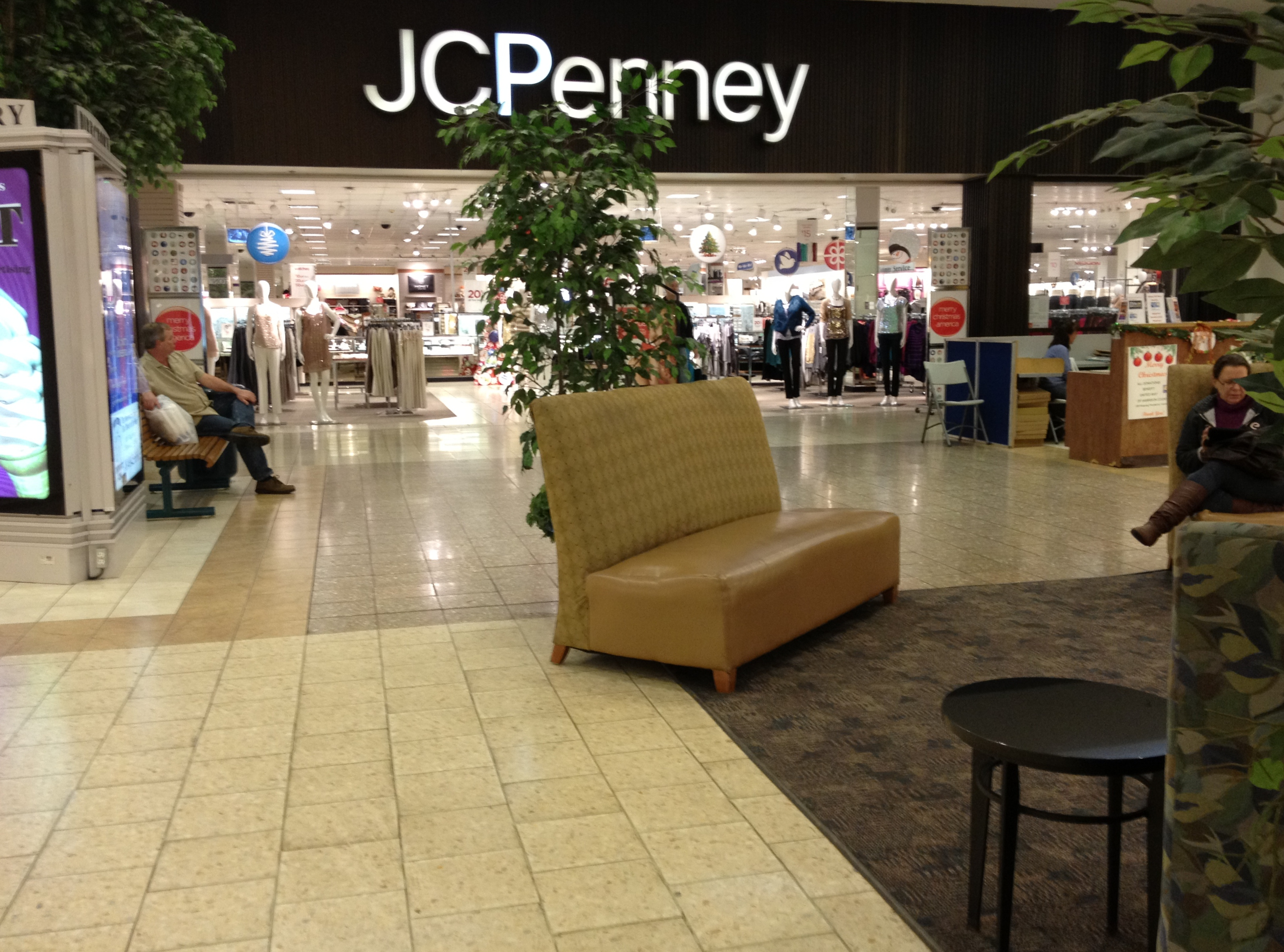
- JCPenney at Meadowbrook Mall, December 2012
- Location: Bridgeport, West Virginia, United States
- Coordinates: 39.31284°N 80.27243°W
- Address: 2399 Meadowbrook Road
- Opened: 1982
- Developer: Cafaro Company
- Manager: Marcello Lalama
- Owner: Cafaro Company
- Num. of stores: 109
- Num. of anchor tenants: 6
- Floor area: 849,206 square feet (78,894 m^{2})
- Floors: 2 (1 publicly accessible)
- Website: www.meadowbrookmall.com

Meadowbrook Mall is a super-regional shopping mall located in Bridgeport, West Virginia, United States, along Interstate 79. The mall is owned and managed by the Cafaro Company of Youngstown, Ohio. Anchors are JCPenney, Target, Marshalls, Boscov's and a Cinemark theater.

== History ==
Meadowbrook Mall opened in November 1982 with six stores and JCPenney, Murphy's Mart, and Montgomery Ward as anchors. The mall was co-developed and owned by the Gleacher and Cafaro companies. The mall later contained 97 stores, including a Cinema 6 and The Bon-Ton.

Bon-Ton closed by 1990. A 24,141-square-foot (2,242.8 m^{2}) Marshalls was announced to open on October 15, 2009. In 2013, the mall was partially demolished and renovated. ULTA Beauty opened on October 30, 2015. On December 28, 2016, Sears was announced to close in early 2017. On May 18, 2023, Marshalls relocated to the former Elder-Beerman site for the opening of Boscov's on October 5, 2023.

== Gas leak ==
On December 19, 2025, around 6:51 p.m. EST, a gas leak was reported in the mall. This caused the mall to evacuate customers and staff and close to fix the repairs. The mall was reopened on December 20, 2025, at 9:00 a.m EST.
