= Kennedy Mall =

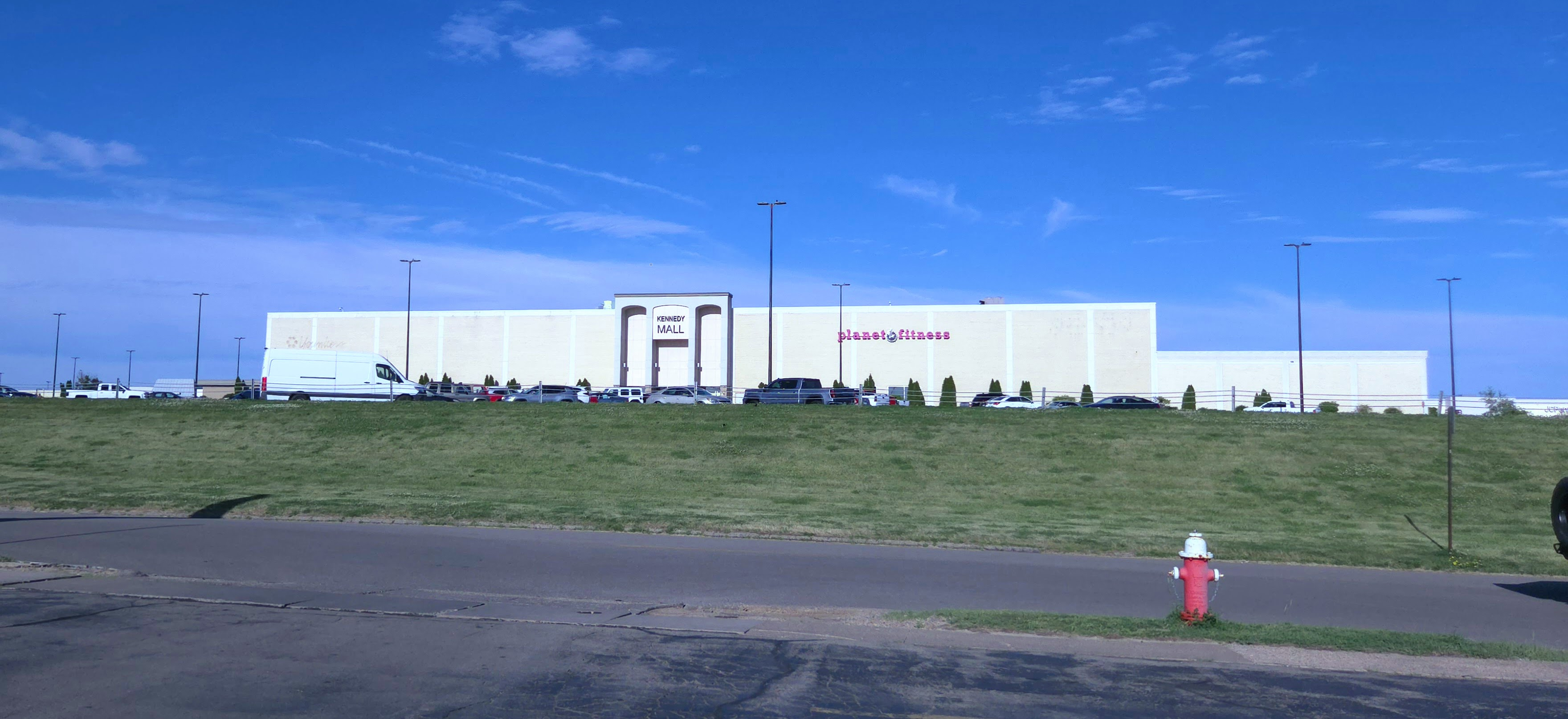
- The western entrance of the Kennedy Mall in June 2026
- Location: Dubuque, Iowa, United States
- Coordinates: 42.494°N 90.723°W
- Opened: April 15, 1970
- Developer: Cafaro Company
- Manager: Cafaro Company
- Owner: Cafaro Company
- Num. of anchor tenants: 8
- Floor area: ~700,000 sq ft (65,000 m^{2})
- Floors: 1 with partial upper level (2 in former Younkers Mens)
- Public transit: Purple The Jule
- Website: kennedymall.com

Kennedy Mall is a shopping mall located in Dubuque, Iowa. It is owned by the Cafaro Company. The mall is anchored by Shoe Carnival, Planet Fitness, JCPenney, Dick's Sporting Goods, Ulta Beauty, HomeGoods, Marshalls, and Books-A-Million.

== Description ==
The Kennedy Mall contains 700,000 square feet (65,000 m^{2}).

== History ==
=== 20th century ===
In 1964, Montgomery Ward announced that it would move its store in Dubuque, which was located in the downtown area, out to the west end. In February 1966, rezoning of the land on which the mall was built was approved. William M. Cafaro and Associates (now Cafaro Company) of Youngstown, Ohio developed the site. The mall was completed in 1968.

In 1968, Younkers was opened as the Kennedy Mall's first store. This was followed by Montgomery Ward in May 1969, and Roshek's in the fall of 1970. The mall was formally opened on April 15, 1970, with F. W. Woolworth Company operating as a junior anchor. At the time, it had sixty stores, which made it Iowa's largest enclosed mall. Soon afterward, a tornado had damaged the Dubuque area, including the mall.

In the 1980s, JCPenney, Younkers, Sears, and Armstrong's would move into the Kennedy Mall. A number of renovations were made to the mall in 1989. This included opening up a food court at the northeast corner of the mall and a number of cosmetic improvements to the mall. Also, a space for Sears was carved out of the Armstrong Department store.

Originally, there was a General Cinema movie theater with a single 795-seat auditorium located within the mall. In 1972, it was remodeled into a two-screen theater with about 300 seats in each auditorium. In the 1980s, General Cinema built a new six-screen theater named Kennedy Mall Cinema 6 in the parking lot just west of the mall to replace the theater inside the mall.

=== 21st century ===
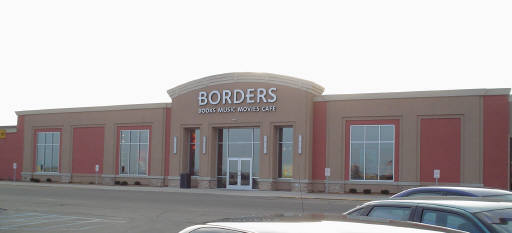
The former Borders book store at the mall. This store is now HomeGoods.

On January 21, 2014, it was announced that Sears would be closing in late April. Vertical Jump Park opened in 2016. Mindframe Theaters closed down January 1, 2017 and was replaced with Michigan-based Phoenix Theatres. In 2018, the Younkers closed, affecting ninety employees.

In early 2020, Kennedy Mall partnered with Carnegie-Stout Public Library to open the Reading Corner, a community reading space inside the mall. The space closed during COVID-19 pandemic and was later displaced by a retail store, but was reopened in February 2024. The closure also came with an order from Governor Kim Reynolds to shut down all non-essential businesses in March 2020. In February 2023, it was announced that Books-A-Million would be moving into half of the former Younkers store. A HomeGoods took over the book store and a few other empty store fronts inside the mall. In June 2024, the mall requested zoning modifications to allow for businesses to be built in the southwestern parking lot. World Earth Minerals Superstore opened in November 2024, also in the former Younkers section. In 2026, Marshalls opened in the Kennedy Mall.
