= William M. Cafaro =

American businessman (1913–1998)

William M. Cafaro (May 23, 1913 – April 22, 1998) was an American pioneer in mall development who founded the Cafaro Company, one of the nation's largest commercial real estate developers.

== Early years ==
Cafaro was born in Youngstown, Ohio, to Anthony and Flora Diana Cafaro. He grew up in the Hazelton neighborhood of the city's east side and attended East High School. He later attended Hall's Business College.

As a youth, Cafaro worked as a pinsetter at a local bowling alley and maintained a paper route in the city's downtown. At the age of 17, he took a job at a local Republic Steel plant and rose to the position of shift foreman. Meanwhile, Cafaro and his brother, John, owned and operated a popular east side establishment known as the Ritz Bar & Supper Club, which drew top entertainers.

== Career ==
His real estate career began in the 1940s, when he began to buy and sell properties on Youngstown's north side. Cafaro used the proceeds from these sales to purchase a car dealership in Warren, Ohio. In the 1950s, he developed supermarkets in Barberton and Akron. His first major undertaking was the development of a large strip mall in Sharon, Pennsylvania. Over the next few decades, the Cafaro Company developed more than 70 commercial properties. These included shopping centers, open malls, and enclosed regional shopping malls.

In the late 1960s, Cafaro established the Eastwood Mall, in Niles, Ohio, one of the country's first "super regional" enclosed shopping centers. As his obituary notes, "That and other projects nationwide each exceeded 1,000,000 square feet (93,000 m^{2}) of retail tenant space under one roof and were considerable engineering feats at the time".

== Civic activities and later years ==
Cafaro was closely associated with the development of Youngstown State University. In the 1960s, he lobbied Ohio state officials to designate YSU as a state university. In addition, he served for years on the board of the YSU Education Foundation, where he was instrumental in the establishment of Cafaro House, a residential honors facility for outstanding students.

Cafaro died at the offices of the Cafaro Company on April 22, 1998. Funeral services were held at Our Lady of Mount Carmel Church in Youngstown.

== Honors ==
In 1970, the president of the Republic of Italy made Cafaro a Knight of the Order of the Italian Solidarity. In 1996, he received a lifetime achievement award from the National Italian American Foundation, in Washington, D. C.
