= Steve & Barry's =

Defunct American retail clothing chain

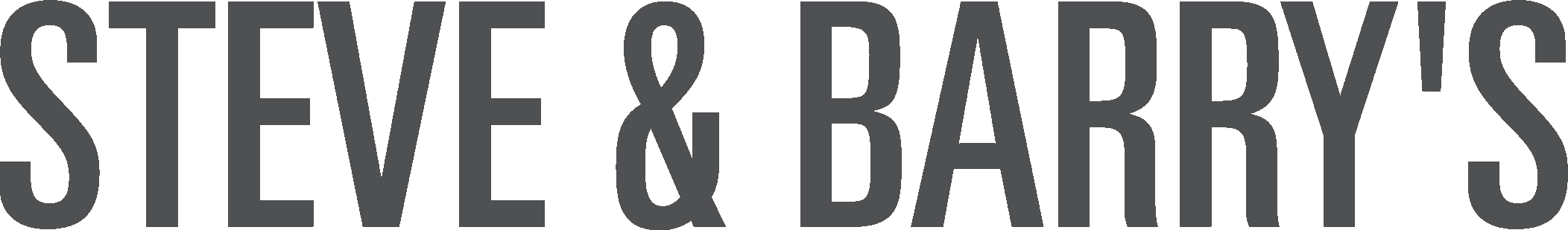

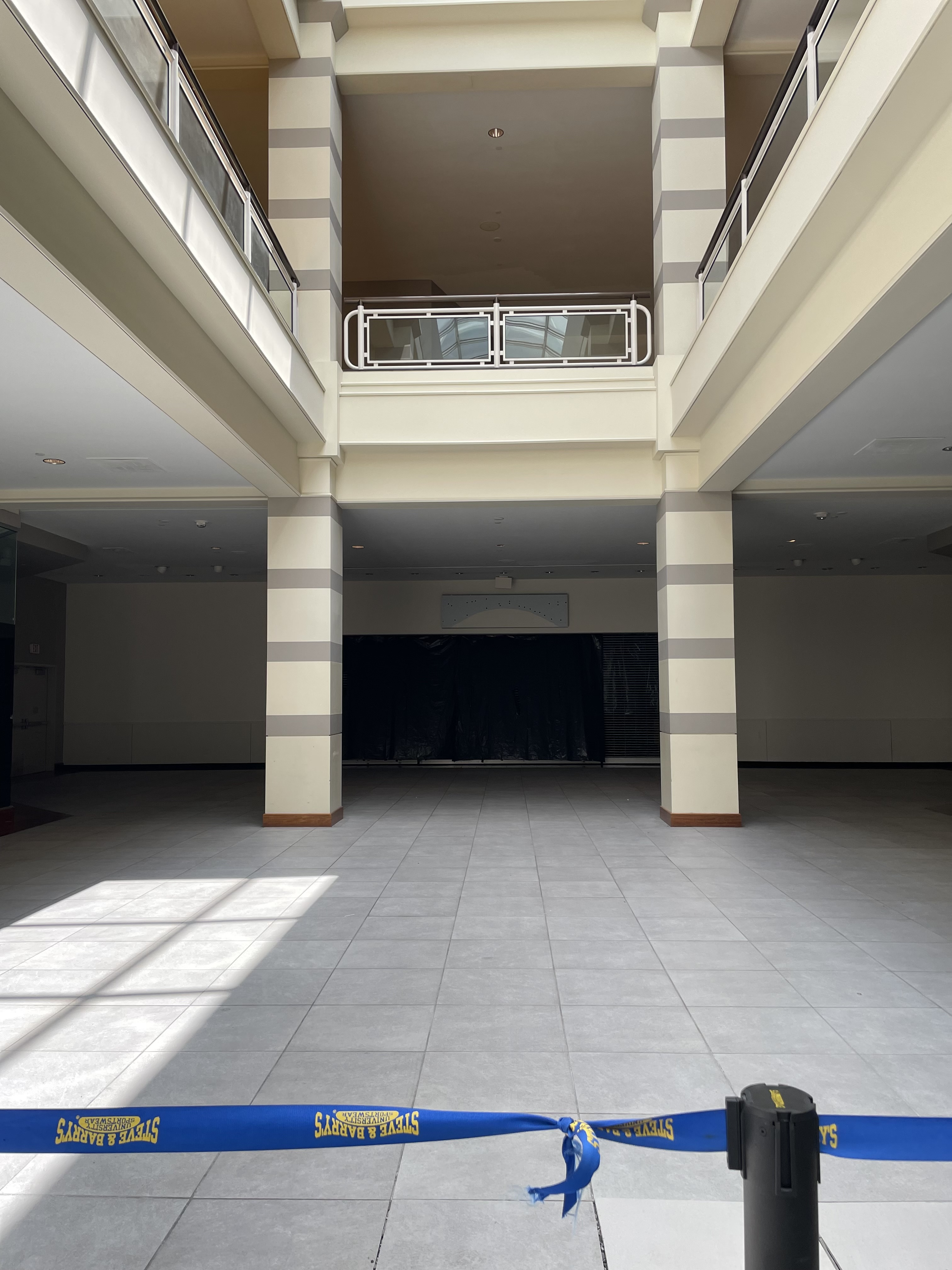
- Former Steve & Barry's store located at Forest Fair Mall in Cincinnati, Ohio. Store logo is visible on stanchions blocking the concourse off.
- Type: Private
- Industry: Retail
- Founded: 1985; 41 years ago (as Steve & Barry's University Sportswear)
- Founders: Steven Shore; Barry Prevor
- Defunct: 2009; 17 years ago
- Fate: Bankruptcy And Liquidation
- Headquarters: Port Washington, New York, U.S.
- Key people: Hal Kahn; (chief executive officer); Gary Sugarman; (COO)
- Products: Clothing
- Revenue: $1.1 billion (2008)

Steve & Barry's was an American retail clothing chain, featuring casual clothing, footwear and accessories. Headquartered in Port Washington, New York, the chain operated 276 stores in 39 states before liquidating throughout 2008 and 2009.

The chain's origin was based on various university campuses across the United States. Until 2007, it was called Steve & Barry's University Sportswear, and the chain specialized in college-related clothing and private-label casual clothing. The chain dropped the "University Sportswear" tagline after securing licensing agreements with several celebrities to develop and distribute private-label lines of clothing designed or inspired by each of them, in an attempt to expand the chain's customer base.

== History ==
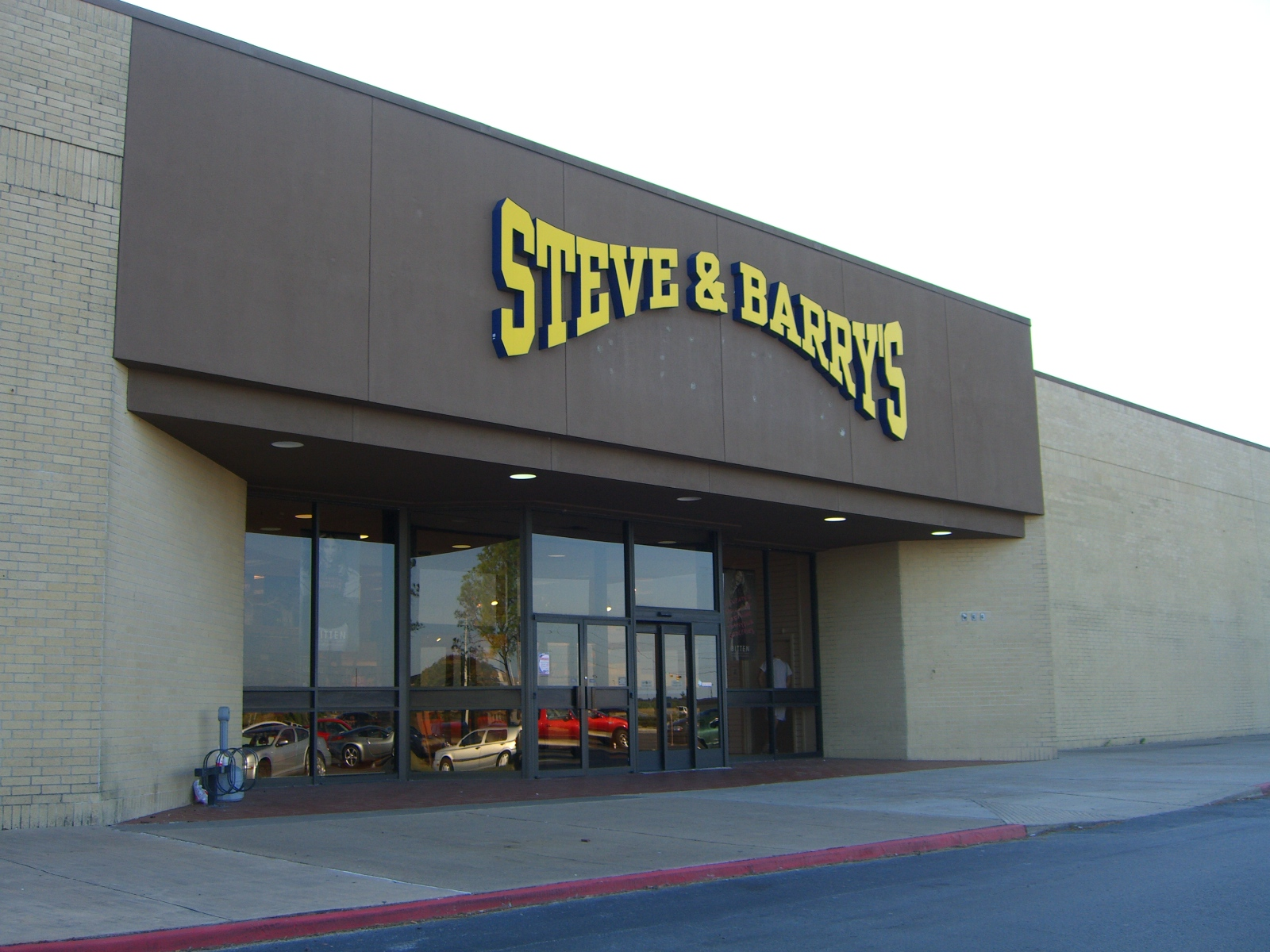
Steve & Barry's store, a former Mervyn's, at West Oaks Mall, Houston, Texas, demolished in 2011 for Edwards Theaters which is now closed

Founded by Steven Shore and Barry Prevor at the University of Pennsylvania in 1985 while Prevor was an undergraduate student, Steve & Barry's became a local popular destination due to its low prices compared to other university bookstores and gift stores. The success of the original store led to the opening of locations on university campuses, including Michigan State University, the University of Michigan, the University of Illinois, the University of Wisconsin–Madison, Indiana University, Rutgers University, the University of Colorado at Boulder, and Purdue University.

In 1998, Steve & Barry's opened its first large mall-based store at Great Lakes Crossing in Auburn Hills, Michigan. The new line of products included business casual, denim, active wear, outerwear, footwear and T-shirts. In addition, the company began marketing "All-American" brands such as Hershey's, Marvel Comics, Ford, WWE, My Little Pony, Monopoly, and General Mills cereals, amongst others.

The continuing product line expansion and store growth allowed the company to achieve a 50% annual growth rate over more than two decades. The International Council of Shopping Centers named Steve & Barry's as the "Hot Retailer of the Year" in 2005, along with Apple Computer and Williams-Sonoma, for generating the most mall traffic and cachet. Brandweek named Steve & Barry's 2007 Marketer of the Year. The Company's in-house video productions won a 2007 Silver Telly Award for distinction in creative work. By 2007, Steve & Barry's was ranked in the 400 largest private companies in America by Forbes Magazine. Founders Steve Shore and Barry Prevor were awarded the Ernst & Young Entrepreneur of the Year Award for 2006 in a metropolitan New York Area 20th anniversary event with more than 500 people in attendance.

For several years, the company was the fastest growing specialty retailer in the United States, adding 3,200,000 square feet (300,000 m^{2}) of new retail space in 2005, 6,000,000 square feet (560,000 m^{2}) of new retail space in 2006, and 5,250,000 square feet (488,000 m^{2}) of new retail space in 2007; more than the combined total of specialty clothing competitors Gap (Gap, Banana Republic, Old Navy), Abercrombie & Fitch, American Eagle Outfitters, and Pacific Sunwear. Steve & Barry's was among the top 10 builders of new square footage among all retailers in the United States when including big-box chains like Wal-Mart, Target, Home Depot, Walgreens, Costco, etc.

In 2006, private equity firm TA Associates closed a minority investment in the company for an undisclosed amount. A group of investment firms led by Bay Harbour Management, former owner of Barneys New York luxury department store chain, later purchased the company for $168 million. In early 2008, GE Commercial Finance Corporate Lending provided a $197 million (~$281 million in 2024) asset-based credit facility to the company, for working capital to replace Steve & Barry's credit facility from the CIT Group.

On July 9, 2008, the company filed for Chapter 11 bankruptcy reorganization, citing a liquidity squeeze and the economic downturn, while in discussions with potential strategic and financial partners for a stronger Steve & Barry's to emerge. While initial results were promising, reorganization efforts ultimately failed, and successor parent company BH S&B Holdings announced the liquidation of its 173 remaining stores at the height of the credit crisis on November 27, 2008, which later converted the Chapter 11 reorganization into a Chapter 7 liquidation.

== Celebrity lines ==
In 2006, the chain announced its partnership with NBA point guard Stephon Marbury, a joint venture in which the chain would produce Marbury's Starbury Collection, a 50-item line of discount clothing, athletic clothing, and sneakers. The centerpiece of the line was the Starbury One, a basketball sneaker that retailed for $14.98. The low price point for an authentic on-court NBA shoe was positioned as a social statement, including donations of thousands of pairs to public school basketball players, with publicity that caused lines and sold-out conditions at many Steve & Barry's stores. Marbury liked the high-quality, low price-point promise, which, as he later said, meant "we can help teach kids to be responsible, earn their own money and buy these shoes without asking their parents for money." When the collection was unveiled in August 2006, Marbury committed his time and energy by handing out Starburys to high school athletes at basketball camps, on playground courts and in barber shops. He wore on-court exactly the same shoes that consumers got off the shelves. In March 2007, the company announced that then Chicago Bulls center, and 4-time NBA Defensive Player of the Year, Ben Wallace, would endorse the Starbury brand, wearing Starbury's during all his games and debuting his own Big Ben Starbury sneaker in the 2007-08 NBA season.

Similarly, Sarah Jessica Parker introduced her own clothing line, BITTEN, on June 7, 2007. The brand was originally leaked to the press during an early fashion show in March 2007. The Bitten name came from the phrase that one who becomes an actor has been "Bitten" by the acting bug. After an appearance on The Oprah Winfrey Show, the brand launched in early June 2007, with roughly 400 pieces of clothing that was reported to grow to 500 or more by the fall. The line achieved significant commercial and critical success. Sarah Jessica Parker stated that growing up with her sister's hand-me-downs inspired her to do something so affordable, explaining "It's a way of giving women without financial means access to good, simple, well-made clothes to feel proud of." The Project Runway reality television series, with Sarah Jessica Parker as guest judge, went on to design clothing which was sold exclusively at Steve & Barry's stores.

Announced during the summer of 2007, former Nickelodeon star Amanda Bynes also debuted a clothing line, Dear, on August 16, 2007. Similar to the Bitten line, Dear was a women's brand that appealed mostly to younger women.

Steve & Barry's signed tennis star Venus Williams to market her own clothing and sneakers line called EleVen.

Likewise, American golfer Bubba Watson had his own clothing line called "Bubba Golf".

On May 15, 2008, the company debuted big-wave surfer Laird Hamilton's "Wonderwall" collection with a surfing expo around New York's Statue of Liberty. The collection featured men's clothing themed around surfing, skating, and the outdoors, utilizing the tagline "Every man is equal before the wave". Hamilton grew up in Hawaii with a single mom and not a lot of money, and he stated that he teamed with Steve & Barry's because he understood the pressures and wanted his line to speak to teens who haven't had access to hip clothes because of their economic status.

American singer Ciara, who was at the time the face of rap mogul Jay-Z's 'Rocawear' clothing line, unveiled plans to launch her own fashion line with Steve & Barry's in 2008.

== Business model ==
The company was a proponent of "Extreme Value Retailing", generally offering every item in the store at a single price point of $5.98 to $9.98, varying with seasonal offerings. Some high value celebrity endorsed items were sometimes sold for slightly higher prices up to a maximum of $19.98. Shore and Prevor discussed their methods for keeping prices down.

Steve & Barry's business model was to keep prices low by not advertising through traditional streams, relying on publicity and viral marketing to get the word out, running its company and stores very efficiently, selling in large volumes, and making modest profits on each item. It also sourced clothing progressively, meaning it purchases product from a wide variety of manufacturers at different times throughout the year. The bidding between manufacturers allowed the buyer to purchase at a lower per unit cost than larger retailers who frequently have standing contracts with suppliers.

The company's low prices and exclusive product lines drew significant traffic and cachet, helping to draw shoppers to smaller retailers in the same shopping complex. The company often opened retail locations in economically challenged areas with household-income levels, crime rates and population trends that caused other retailers to abandon the neighborhood. Individual store sizes of 25,000 to 150,000 square feet made the retailer a mall's anchor store, allowing the company to negotiate low rents and large cash inducements.

== Financial problems and bankruptcy plan ==
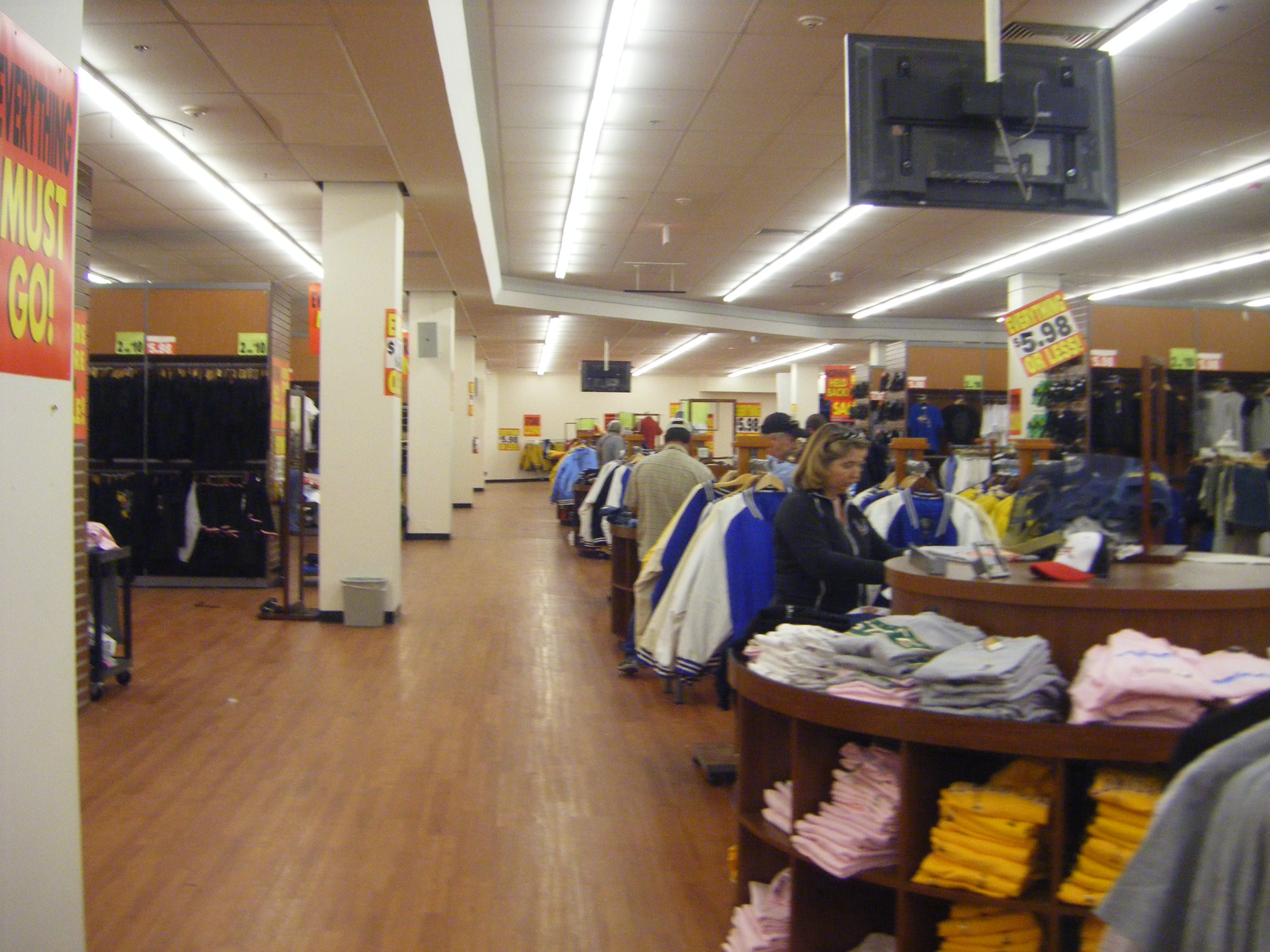
Steve & Barry's liquidation sale with all items priced at $5.98

As of June 21, 2008, the company was deficient in paying a $135.9 million balance outstanding to a General Electric Commercial lending unit. The firm filed for bankruptcy protection under Chapter 11 on July 9, 2008. All stores were to remain open with the store's return policy, store credit, and gift cards unchanged. Founders and co-Chief Executives Steve Shore and Barry Prevor cited liquidity concerns and the generally harsh conditions for retailers in recent months.

The Associated Press reported that Steve & Barry's was considering a plan to sell all or some of its assets to repay its outstanding debt. Steve & Barry's was also in talks with Sears Holdings Corporation for a possible acquisition. It was reported that Sears might have been interested in buying some or all of Steve & Barry's brands, or that Sears Holdings could open Steve & Barry's store-within-a-store areas in its Sears or Kmart locations.

On August 21, 2008, Steve & Barry's announced that BH S&B Holdings LLC, a newly formed affiliate of investment firm Bay Harbour Management L.C., agreed to acquire certain assets of Steve & Barry's. In addition to acquiring merchandise inventories and transfer rights to Steve & Barry's store leases, BH S&B Holdings would acquire all Steve & Barry's intellectual property rights, including its celebrity and brand licenses, and the company's key facilities, including its Port Washington, New York headquarters, Columbus, Ohio distribution center, and certain overseas offices. Bay Harbour planned to keep open about 150 of the chain's 276 stores, and brought Hal Kahn, chairman and CEO of Macy's East, on board as the new CEO.

Bankruptcy documents revealed 2008 annual sales of $1.1 billion and assets of $693 million. Total sales in 2008 increased by approximately 70% from prior year sales, with average sales per store increasing by 25%.

Reorganization efforts failed, with court filings stating that revenue suffered because of the declining health of the U.S. economy and the slump in the retail market. On November 20, 2008, after closing many stores, Steve and Barry's parent company announced the remaining 176 stores would be liquidated by early 2009 and the chain was going out of business.
