= River Falls (Clarksville, Indiana) =

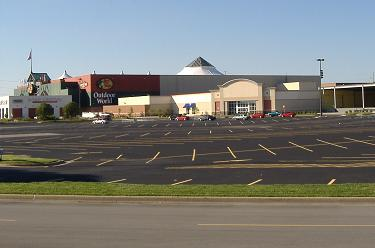
- Bass Pro Shop after Remodel of River Falls Mall
- Location: Clarksville, Indiana, United States
- Coordinates: 38°19′15″N 85°45′43″W
- Opened: 1990
- Closed: 2006 (original indoor mall) (current power center still open)
- Developer: General Growth Properties
- Manager: Columbus Pacific Properties
- Owner: Columbus Pacific Properties
- Num. of stores: 7
- Num. of anchor tenants: 5
- Floor area: 828,647 square feet (76,983.8 m^{2})
- Floors: 2

River Falls is a shopping center in Clarksville, Indiana, on Lewis and Clark Parkway (formerly State Road 131). From its opening in 1990 as River Falls Mall until 2006, it was an enclosed mall, with 762,000 square feet (70,800 m^{2}) of gross leasable area. It originally comprised multiple entertainment venues and retail. After losing the majority of its tenants, River Falls was redeveloped in 2006 as a power center, comprising Dick's Sporting Goods, Old Time Pottery, Jo-Ann Fabrics, Gabe's Department Store, and Bass Pro Shops.

== History ==
River Falls Mall opened in 1990, across from the existing Green Tree Mall and comprising 762,000 square feet (70,800 m^{2}) of retail space. It included Walmart and Bacon's as its anchor stores, as well as several entertainment venues, such as miniature golf and bumper cars. Dawahares (later All About Sports) and Toys "R" Us also operated within the mall. When Bacon's parent company was acquired by Dillard's in 1998, Dillard's operated its men's clothing, children's clothing, and housewares departments in the former Bacon's building, while retaining women's clothing at the Green Tree Mall store. Although the mall struggled with high vacancy for most of its existence, the addition of a Dick's Sporting Goods in 1999 briefly increased occupancy to 92 percent.

Bass Pro Shops entered negotiations with Chicago-based mall owner General Growth Properties in 2002 to open a store at the mall. Negotiations were completed and construction on the Bass Pro Shops store was started in early 2004. Dillard's closed its store around this time, returning all of its departments to the Green Tree Mall location, as had been the case before the River Falls store opened. Soon afterward, the movie theater closed, and Walmart moved out of the mall to a new Supercenter. Dick's Sporting Goods then moved out of the middle of the mall and into the former Walmart. In 2005, Bass Pro Shops opened, displacing most of the mall itself. Toys "R" Us, the former Dillard's, and the former Walmart were all left standing.

Since the opening of Bass Pro Shops, the mall has been "de-malled", and turned into a power center consisting of big-box stores. Subsequent openings include Old Time Pottery and Louisville Athletic Club, both of which displaced portions of the former Walmart wing. A brand new movie theater, Great Escape River Falls 12, opened in November 2006. The rest of the former mall structure between Dick's Sporting Goods and Bass Pro Shops has become Old Time Pottery, Louisville Athletic Club, hhgregg (closed 2017), and Jo-Ann Fabrics. Toys "R" Us was the only holdover still in its original location from when it was an enclosed mall, however after the company's bankruptcy in 2018, Toys "R" Us has since closed.

Gabe's Department Store opened in the former shopping complex in 2024.

Since the closure of Toys “R” Us in 2018, the space has been used as an expo center. Each month, the Indiana Reptile Breeders Expo is held. The expo acts as a place to buy and sell reptiles, interact with the reptiles, and a place to buy pet supplies.

== See also ==
- List of shopping malls in the United States
