= Wayne Kent Taylor =

American businessman (1955–2021)

- Born: September 27, 1955; Fort Leonard Wood, Missouri, U.S.
- Died: March 18, 2021 (aged 65); Louisville, Kentucky, U.S.
- Citizenship: United States
- Education: University of North Carolina
- Children: 3

Wayne Kent Taylor (September 27, 1955 – March 18, 2021) was an American businessman. He was the founder and CEO of the Texas Roadhouse restaurant chain.

== Early life ==
Taylor was born at Fort Leonard Wood, Missouri, to Powell Taylor, a lieutenant in the Army, and Marilyn (Bergmann) Taylor. Taylor grew up in Louisville, Kentucky. His father worked for General Electric after leaving the Army, and his mother was a buyer for a local boutique.

He graduated from the University of North Carolina at Chapel Hill, which he attended while on a track scholarship.

== Career ==
Taylor founded Texas Roadhouse in 1993, at the Green Tree Mall in Clarksville, Indiana. His goal was to create an "affordable, Texas-style" restaurant. He was turned down more than 80 times while seeking investors. His initial investors were three doctors from Elizabethtown, Kentucky, who invested $300,000. To show the investors his initial design for the first restaurant, Taylor sketched the design on a cocktail napkin.

Until his death, Taylor was involved in the chain's day-to-day operations.

== Philanthropy ==
During the COVID-19 pandemic in the United States, Taylor donated his compensation package to support his company's frontline workers, and had committed to fund a clinical study to help members of the military who had tinnitus.

== Personal life ==
Taylor had three children and five grandchildren.

== Death ==
Taylor died by suicide on March 18, 2021, at the age of 65. He had been struggling with post-COVID-19 symptoms including severe tinnitus for months after becoming infected with the virus. After some improvement from an experimental treatment, "Taylor went to get his COVID vaccine and the tinnitus came roaring back. Two days later [...]" he died by suicide.
