= Grant Street Transportation Center =

Bus station and parking garage in Pittsburgh, Pennsylvania

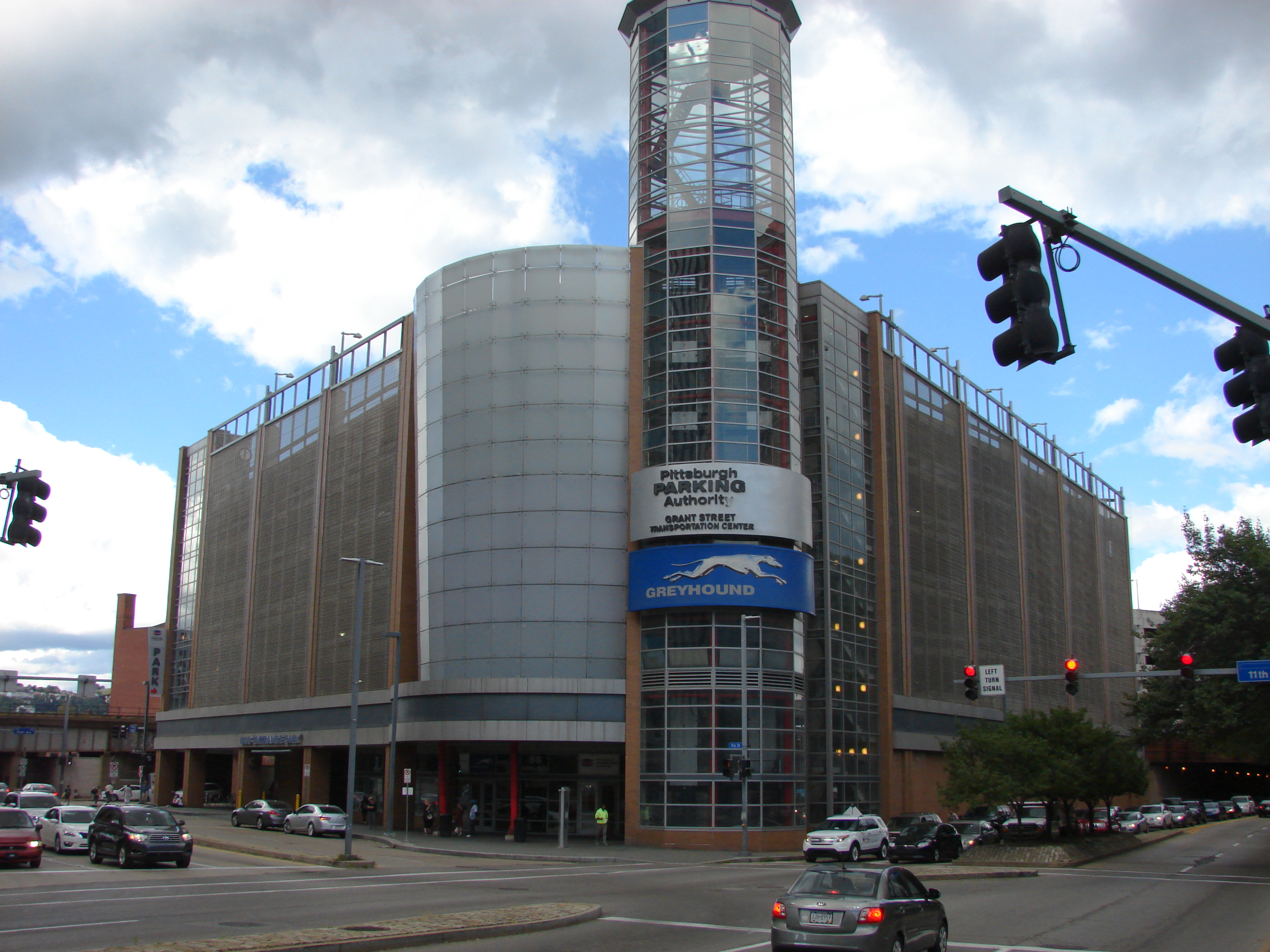
- Main entrance to the bus station and tall glass tower at the corner of Liberty Avenue and 11th Street

General information
- Location: 55 11th Street; Pittsburgh, Pennsylvania
- Coordinates: 40°26′41″N 79°59′36″W
- Owner: Pittsburgh Parking Authority
- Bus stands: 14
- Bus operators: Amtrak Thruway; Greyhound Lines; FlixBus; Fullington Trailways; Mid Mon Valley Transit Authority; Mountain Line Transit Authority
- Connections: Amtrak (at Union Station) East Busway (at Penn Station)

Construction
- Parking: 991 spaces
- Architect: IKM

History
- Opened: September 9, 2008
Location
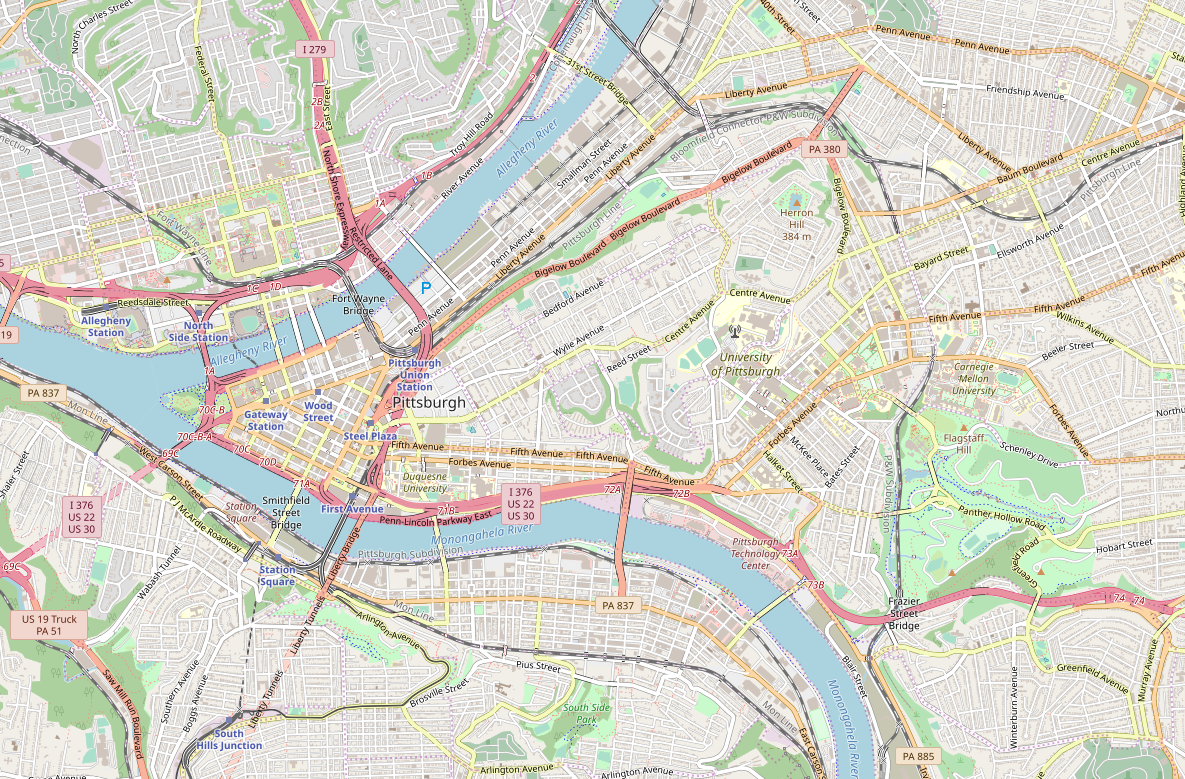
- Location within Downtown Pittsburgh

The Grant Street Transportation Center is an intercity bus station and parking garage in downtown Pittsburgh, Pennsylvania. The facility is operated by the Pittsburgh Parking Authority and takes up an entire city block, with the ground floor hosting the bus station and some retail space. Upper floors are dedicated to parking.

== Operations ==
=== Bus station ===
The ground floor bus station covers 24,647 square feet (2,289.8 m^{2}) and hosts 14 bus slips. The main entrance to the bus station is at the base of the 165-foot-tall (50 m) glass tower at the corner of Liberty Avenue and 11th Street. The center is located across the street from Pittsburgh Union Station which is served by two daily Amtrak trains and is the western terminus of the Martin Luther King Jr. East Busway.

Greyhound Lines is the primary tenant at the bus station, but it is also served by Amtrak Thruway, Fullington Trailways, Commuter routes A, 1 and 2 of the Mid Mon Valley Transit Authority and the 29 Grey Line of the Mountain Line Transit Authority.

=== Parking structure ===
Above ground level, the property is bisected by an elevated railroad bridge. The result is that from ground level, the center appears as one facility visually, but functions as two separate parking garages, referred to as the red and blue garages, with a total of 991 spaces.

The parking authority advertises the center as being a parking location for the nearby David L. Lawrence Convention Center, Heinz History Center, August Wilson African American Cultural Center, and Strip District. The center also offers long-term parking for passengers catching a train from Union Station or riding an intercity bus route.

== History ==
The center replaced a Greyhound station that was built in 1959 on the same property. At the time of its construction, the center cost US$50 million to build.

The plan for the transportation center started to come together in summer 2002. At that time, Greyhound approached the city, looking to rebuild its 40-year-old bus station. At the same time, the city had also been looking to add parking for Downtown, the Strip District and the Convention Center which, at the time, was about to open a major expansion. A plan for the parking authority to buy the land, raize the old bus station and replace it with a combination bus station and parking garage was announced in February 2003. Greyhound moved out of the old bus station in July 2005 and into temporary buildings in the parking authority's Second Avenue Plaza lot. The primary architect for the project was IKM and the general contractor was PJ Dick.

The new bus station opened on September 9, 2008, ahead of a grand opening for the entire facility a few weeks later on September 29.
