= Nittany Mall =

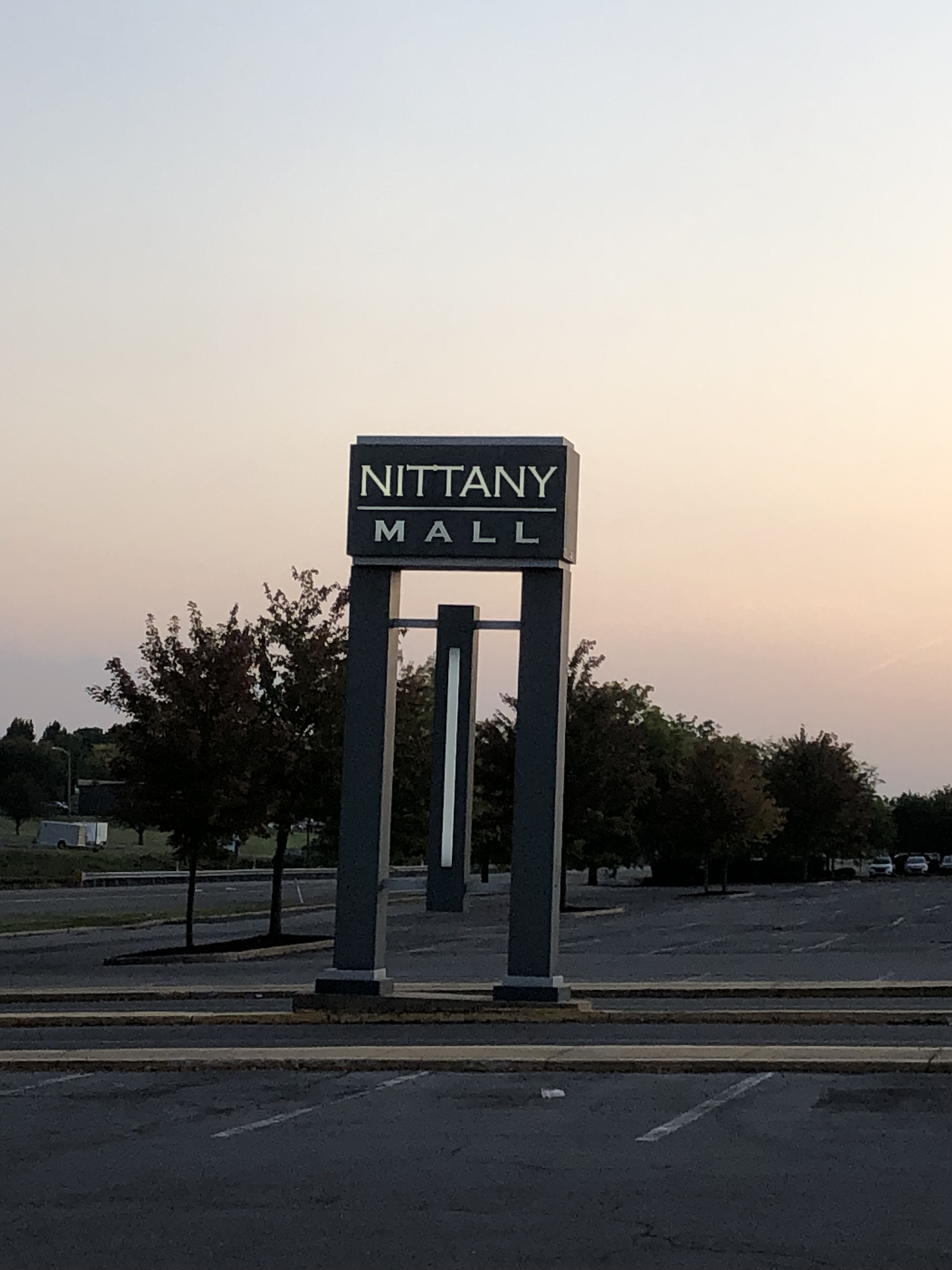
- Location: College Township, Centre County, Pennsylvania, United States
- Coordinates: 40°50′01.7″N 77°47′52.3″W
- Address: 2901 East College Avenue; State College, Pennsylvania
- Opened: January 1968
- Developer: Crown American
- Manager: Namdar Realty Group
- Owner: Namdar Realty Group
- Num. of stores: 29
- Num. of anchor tenants: 4
- Floor area: 532,160 square feet (49,439 m^{2})
- Floors: 1
- Parking: Lighted lot
- Public transit: CATA bus: CC, XB
- Website: shopnittanymall.com

Nittany Mall is an enclosed regional shopping mall in College Township, Centre County, Pennsylvania, serving the State College area. It is located at the intersections of Route 150 and Route 26, one mile off the I-99 corridor. It is uniquely situated within four miles of the Pennsylvania State University, allowing the mall to attract both area residents as well as college students. Current anchor stores are Dunham's Sports, Gabe's, Rural King, and Happy Valley Casino.

== History ==
The Nittany Mall was developed by Crown American and officially opened in January 1968. The mall originally had just two anchors, Grants and Penn Traffic, and approximately 30 smaller stores. Its first expansion in 1970 included the addition of a Sears store, which was relocated from downtown State College, and over a dozen other smaller stores. The new Sears included 45 merchandise departments and a 10-bay automotive center.

After the closing of the Grants chain in 1976, Gee Bee took over the space. Penn Traffic, one of the mall's original anchors, was sold to developer and Hess's department store chain owner Crown American in 1982 who rebranded the stores as Hess's. The expansion and renovation of the Nittany Mall in 1989-1990 included the addition of a fourth anchor, JCPenney. Also at this time, the Sears store was expanded and relocated to a new east section of the mall while the Sears automotive center was moved to a separate location in the mall and eventually moved again to a new standalone building on the property.

In 1992, Gee Bee was converted to Value City after that company acquired the Gee Bee stores chain. Hess's continued to operate at the mall until 1994 when it was sold to Bon-Ton Stores. Value City operated until 1997 when it was closed and razed to make room for a new Kaufmann's department store. The May Department Stores Company, which owned Kaufmann's, was sold to Federated Department Stores in 2005. Federated proceeded to convert various May properties to Macy's, including the Nittany Mall store, in 2006.

The JCPenney store remained at the mall until 2015 when JCPenney announced plans to close 39 of its stores in the United States that year. The JCPenney store was replaced by a Dunham's Sports, one of the nation's largest sporting goods chains, in 2016. In November 2017, Sears announced it would be closing 63 more of its stores including the Nittany Mall location. The Sears store closed in January 2018 but the automotive center remained open for three more years. In April 2018, it was announced that the entire Bon-Ton stores chain would be closing as the company failed to find a suitable buyer. The Sears and Bon-Ton closures left the mall with just two anchors (Dunham's Sports and Macy's) for the first time since 1970.

On January 6, 2020, it was announced that the Macy's store would be closing in March 2020. In March 2021, Rural King department store opened in the former Sears space. A few months later in June 2021, Gabe's department store opened in the former Bon-Ton location. Construction of a Bally's mini-casino, which had been expected to open at the former Macy's site in 2022, had been delayed due to ongoing petition hearings.

In 2025, construction began on the casino in the former Macy’s site with an opening date of spring 2026. In June 2025, Saratoga Casino Holdings of upstate New York was brought on to manage the casino as the majority owner and replaced Bally’s as the owner and operator. Saratoga Casino Holdings bought SC Gaming OpCo, LLC, the entity that was building the project. The casino has 750 slot machines and 30 live-dealer table games, plus a sportsbook area. The casino was named Happy Valley Casino and held a preview event for the media in April, 2026. The casino then opened on April 27, 2026. Upon its completion, the mall had all of its anchor stores occupied.

== Gallery ==
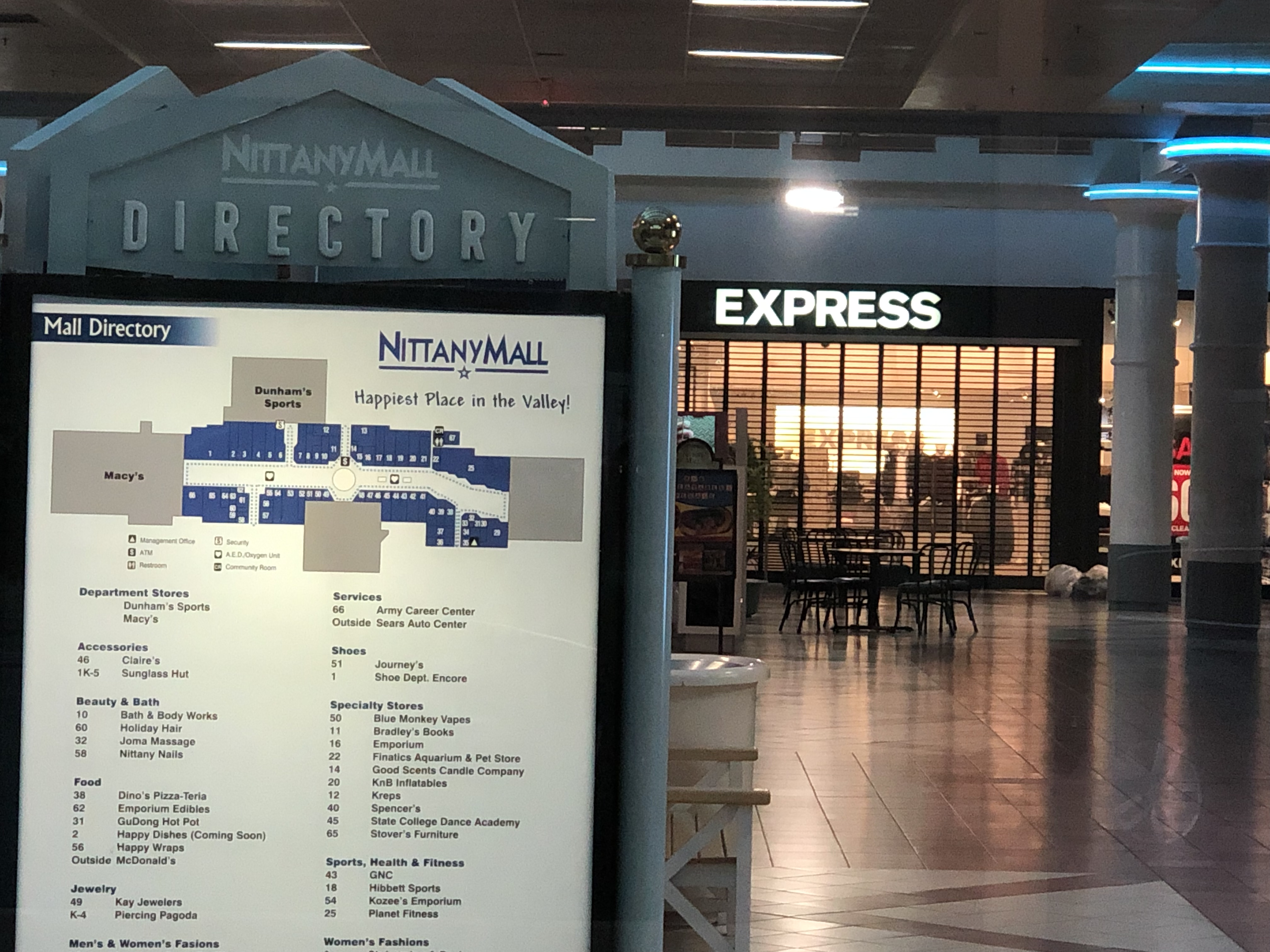
Interior

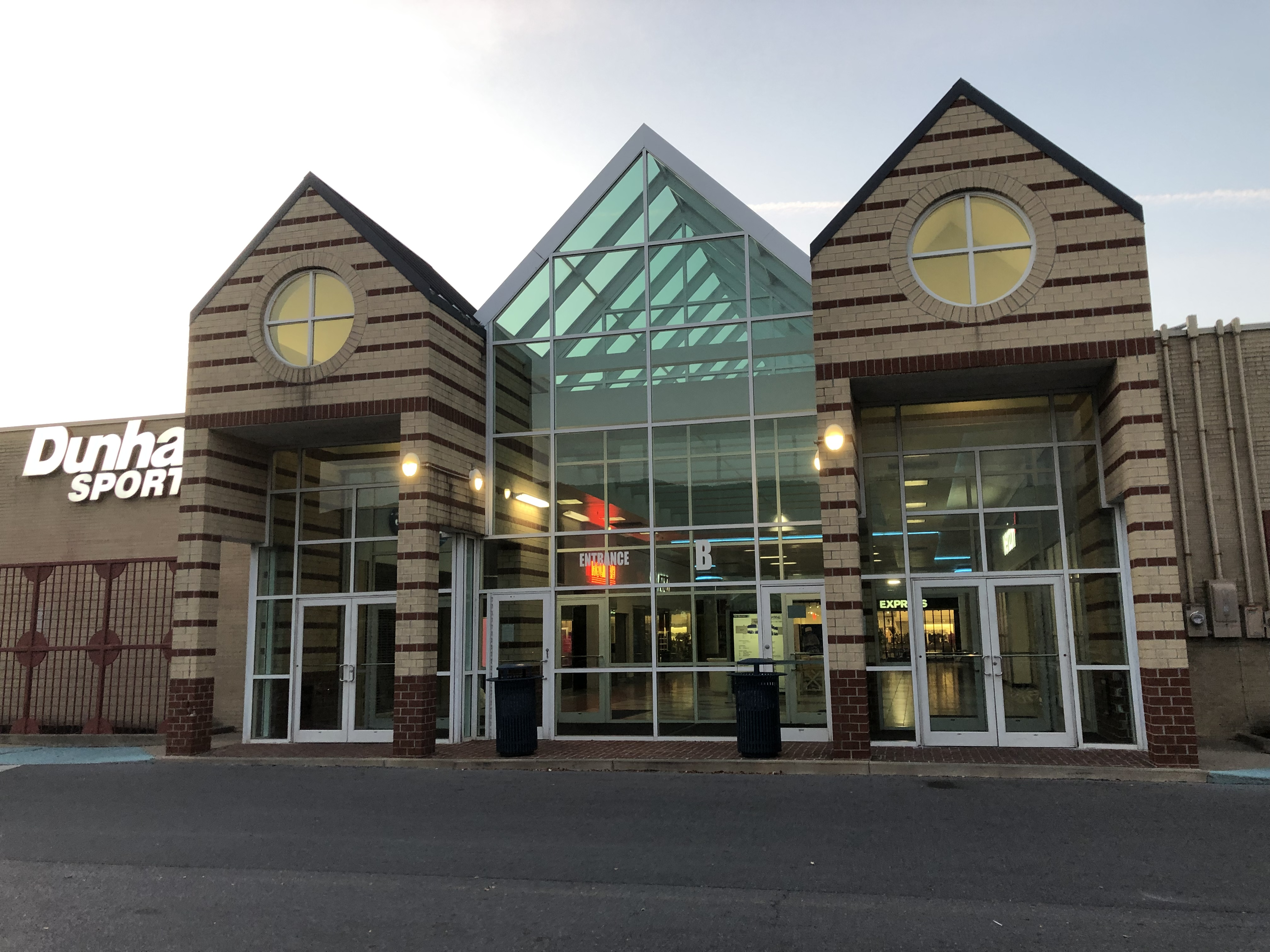
Mall south entrance

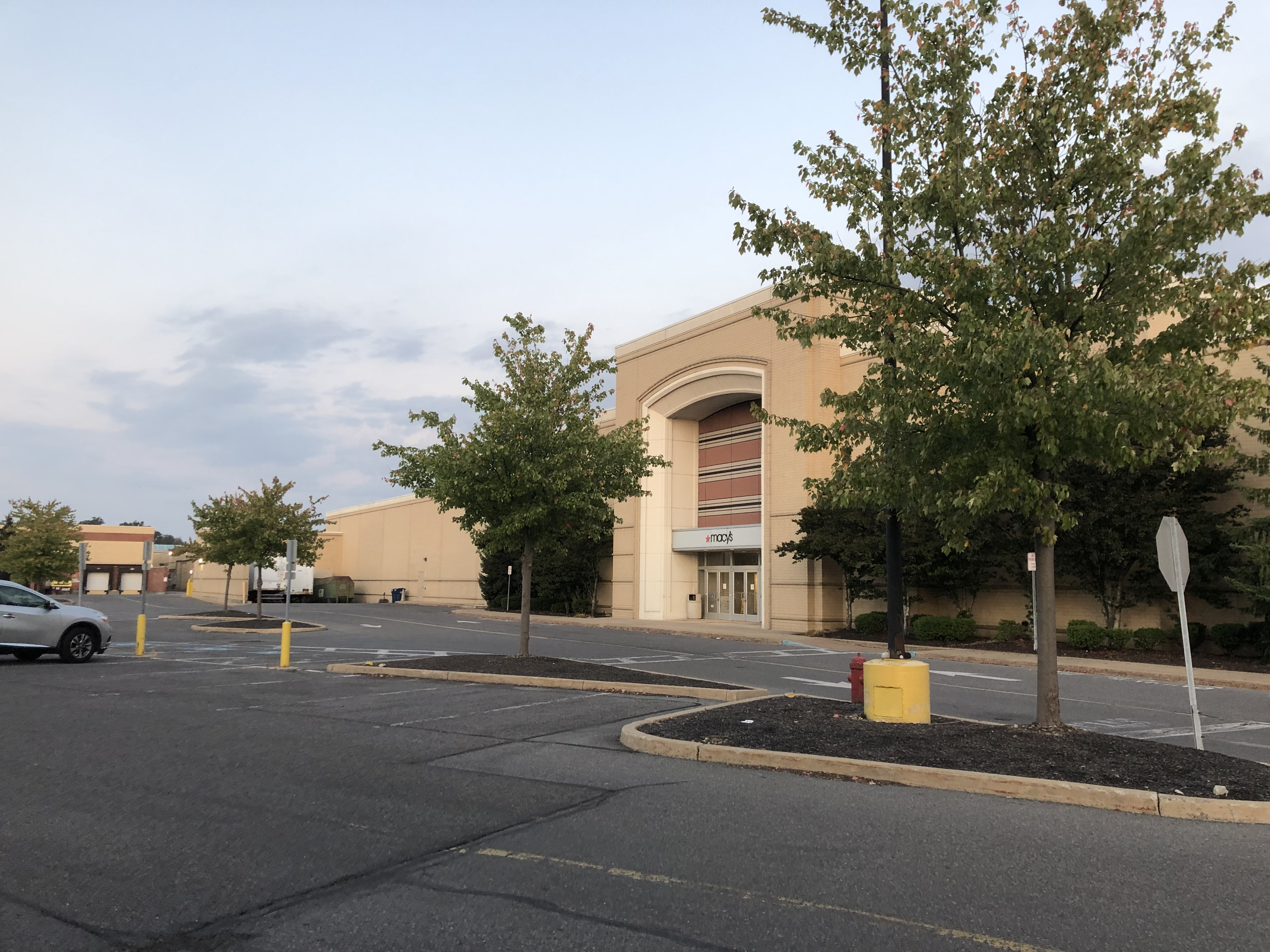
Former Macy's

== See also ==
- List of shopping malls in Pennsylvania
