= Mountaineer Mall =

Dead mall in Morgantown, West Virginia

- Interior view (May 2026)
- Location: Morgantown, West Virginia, U.S.
- Coordinates: 39°36′20″N 79°57′39″W
- Address: 5000 Greenbag Rd
- Opened: August 5, 1975; 51 years ago
- Renovated: 1987
- Developer: First Union Management
- Owner: Jager Management Inc.
- Num. of stores: 30 (as of October 2026)
- Num. of anchor tenants: 4 (1 open, 3 vacant)
- Floor area: 676,000 square feet (62,802 m^{2})
- Floors: 1
- Parking: 6,000
- Public transit: MLTA: Route 4; Buckwheat Express: Route 2
- Website: www.mountaineerplaza.com

Mountaineer Mall and Professional Plaza is a shopping mall and business park located in Morgantown, West Virginia, United States. It is the first of two malls built in Morgantown; the other is the Morgantown Mall. Major tenants are Senior Monongalians, Spark! Imagination and Science Center, and Osher Lifelong Learning Institutes.

== Overview ==
Mountaineer Mall is composed of rusted-brick wall with tiled flooring and carpets; benches, trees, and planters laid throughout the walkways. It was built for 65 stores. The singular corridor had Montgomery Ward to the east, JCPenney in the center, and Murphy’s Mart to the west. The 1987 addition extruded from the central area and had fake skylights and brass fixtures. The addition was built on a slight incline, so a ramp and accompanied stairs were needed to connect the two.

== History ==
Mountaineer Mall was developed by First Union Management on the south side of Morgantown, off of U.S. Route 119 and on a raised bluff near the Monongahela River. The mall started construction in 1973 and it partially-opened with 19 stores on August 5, 1975. 32 stores were open by January the next year. Anchors were Murphy's Mart (later Ames), JCPenney, and Montgomery Ward. It was the first mall to open in the Morgantown metropolitan area and despite its compact size, was a big success. In 1987, the mall was expanded 143,000 square feet (13,300 m^{2}), which would include the construction of a freestanding Giant Eagle and a new anchor store, Stone & Thomas, which opened in November.

In the 1990s, many tenants began leave the after the early 1990s recession and the opening of the newer Morgantown Mall. JCPenney followed suit, as they needed more space. The mall then transitioned to attract discount businesses. JCPenney was replaced by U.S. Factory Outlets in 1993, which became Gabriel Brothers in 1996. A 126,000 square feet (11,700 m^{2}) Walmart opened in the former Ames space in January 1994. Stone & Thomas became Elder-Beerman in 1998. Montgomery Ward closed in 1999.

TeleTech opened in 2000, in part of the former Montgomery Ward space. The rest was taken up by General Glass, which opened in February 2005. In 2002, Spark! opened as the Children's Discovery Museum of West Virginia. In April 2005, the International Council of Shopping Centers and the Environmental Protection Agency awarded the Mountaineer Mall with "Best Community Partnership (Large Shopping Center)" for its recycling program. Walmart closed in October 2006, when two new Supercenters opened near Morgantown. In 2007, Gabriel Brothers opened their flagship store in Morgantown Commons near Morgantown Mall, keeping the Mountaineer Mall location open but with a "smaller selection". This would, however, close the next year. Elder-Beerman closed in January 2008 after its lease expiry, having become redundant as the chain had a store at Morgantown Mall. Rex Appliances, one of the last remaining large stores, closed in 2009 when the entire chain shut down. In February 2010, Mylan Pharmaceuticals announced that it would renovate the former Walmart space into offices for its IT and legal departments. The next year, Mylan started renovating the former Gabriel Brothers to expand its offices.

On February 15, 2020, Eloquence Antiques & Artisans moved and reopened in Mountaineer Mall. The store expanded 4,000 square feet (370 m^{2}) in 2026. In early August 2024, the United States Army Reserve held decontamination training drills at the mall. As of 2026, Mylan and TeleTech have vacated the site.

== Gallery ==
Former Elder-Beerman

TeleTech

Former Walmart and Goodwill

Senior Monongalians

Exterior entrance

Sam Goody

Brooks Fashions

== See also ==
- List of shopping malls in West Virginia
- Meadowbrook Mall
- Southwyck Mall
- Machesney Park Mall
- Summit Place Mall
- Rolling Acres Mall
- Randall Park Mall
