= Morgantown Mall =

Shopping mall in West Virginia, US

- Morgantown Mall food court (October 2026)
- Location: Westover (Morgantown), West Virginia, U.S.
- Coordinates: 39°37′36″N 79°59′49″W
- Address: 9500 Mall Rd
- Opened: September 1990
- Owner: Kohan Retail Investment Group
- Num. of stores: 56
- Num. of anchor tenants: 6 (1 vacant)
- Floor area: 555,147 square feet (51,575 m^{2})
- Floors: 1
- Parking: 2998
- Public transit: MLTA bus: Route 2
- Website: www.morgantownmall.com

Morgantown Mall is a shopping mall located in Westover, West Virginia, United States, at the interchange of Interstate 79 and U.S. Route 19. It is the newer of the two malls located in Morgantown; the other is the Mountaineer Mall. Anchors are JCPenney, Dunham's Sports, Burke's Outlet, Home Centric, Ollie's Bargain Outlet, and AMC Classic. WVU Medicine operated in the former Sears as a logistics and distribution center. To the north lies The Morgantown Commons.

== History ==
Plans for the mall were announced in 1989 by Glimcher Realty Trust and site work began on June 12. It was announced to open on September 13, 1990, with Elder-Beerman, JCPenney, Sears, and K-Mart (later Proffitt's) as anchors. The mall was a newer alternative to the Mountaineer Mall located across town along Greenbag Road. Due to its popularity, many anchors abandoned the Mountaineer Mall and began moving to the Morgantown Mall.

On May 29, 2001, Morgantown Mall Associates LTD. Partnership of Columbus, Ohio, filed a complaint via arbitration over the domain name "morgantownmall.com" which had been registered in Rio de Janeiro, Brazil. Morgantown Mall Associates (owner of Morgantown Mall) stated that the domain name was identical to their current website and that it was used in "bad faith". The entity which had registered the domain name failed to respond to the complaint, and the arbitrator, James P. Buchele, ordered the domain name to be transferred to Morgantown Mall Associates.

Proffitt's was converted to Belk, opening on March 1, 2006. On November 1, Gabriel Brothers opened in the nearby Morgantown Commons. Elder Beerman operated two stores in Morgantown in each mall before the closure of the Mountaineer Mall location in January 2008, due to lease expiry. In 2016, The Gap and Hollister left the mall due to their owner companies restructuring. The Hollister was planned to be replaced with a Rue21. On October 15, 2018, Sears was announced to close as part of its national closure of 142 stores due to Chapter 11 bankruptcy. This followed the closures of Belk and Elder-Beerman the same year. Some of the vacant space became Ollie's Bargain Outlet and Dunham's Sports in 2020, the AMC Classic was renovated the same year. In 2025, ownership was transferred from Washington Prime Group to Kohan Retail Investment Group. Their previous owner filed for Chapter 11 bankruptcy protection after the COVID-19 pandemic.

== Gallery ==
Elder-Beerman

Sears

JCPenney

Belk

Steve & Barry's

== See also ==
- List of shopping malls in West Virginia
- Huntington Mall
- Grand Central Mall
- Foxcroft Towne Center at Martinsburg
- Charleston Town Center
- Meadowbrook Mall
