= Clarksville High School (Indiana) =

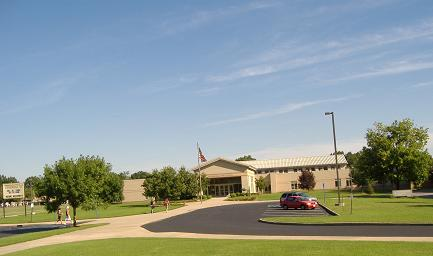

Location
- 800 Dr. Dot Lewis Drive; Clarksville, Indiana 47129; United States; 38°17′56″N 85°46′04″W

Information
- Type: Public high school
- Established: 1955
- School district: Clarksville Community School Corporation
- Principal: Adrienne Goldman
- Staff: 26.67 (on an FTE basis)
- Grades: 9-12
- Enrollment: 385 (2023–2024)
- Student to teacher ratio: 14.44
- Color
- Mascot: Generals
- Website: www.clarksvilleschools.org/clarksville-high

Clarksville High School is located in Clarksville, Indiana, United States. It serves most of the town of Clarksville, but the school boundaries do not exactly match the municipal boundaries. Some students within the town of Clarksville attend Jeffersonville High School or Silver Creek High School.

Clarksville High School has an enrollment of approximately 390 students for the 2013–2014 school year. This is a drop from approximately 750 students in the late 1970s. The town of Clarksville presently has an estimated population of 22,000 residents.

== History ==
The school opened its doors in 1955–1956 and the first class was graduated in 1958. Plans to build it were started in 1952, and by 1955 the school was opened. Before it was built, Clarksville children either went to Jeffersonville High School or New Albany High School.

== Sports ==
Clarksville's school colors are black and white with gold accent, and the school nickname is the Generals. The school song is sung to the tune of the Navy Blue and Gold. Clarksville High School is a member of the Mid-Southern Athletic Conference.

Clarksville High School is host to an annual track meet in the spring. It has historically been called the Clarksville Relays, but the name was changed to The Daniel Faulkner Relays in honor of a 1999 graduate killed in Iraq.

== See also ==
- List of high schools in Indiana
- Mid-Southern Conference
- Clarksville, Indiana
