= Aspen Creek Grill =

American restaurant chain

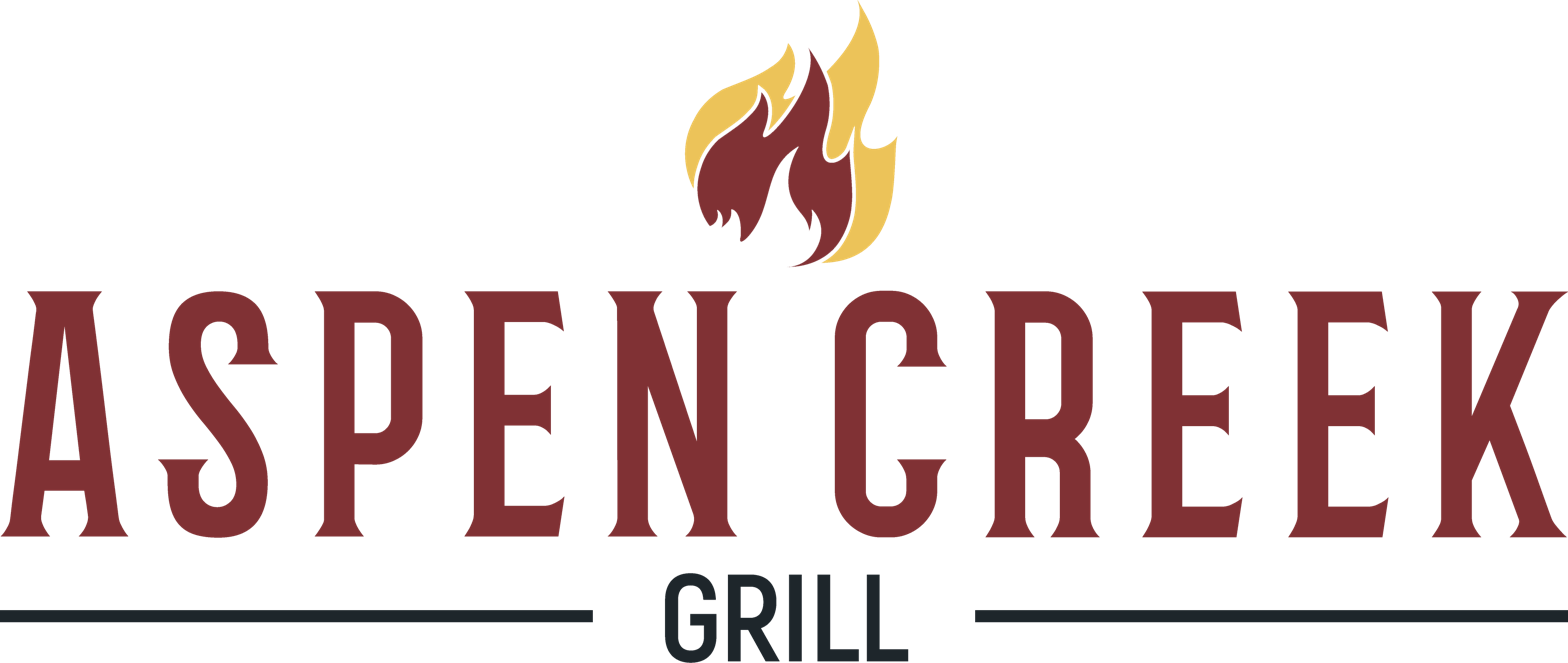
- Company type: Subsidiary
- Industry: Family dining restaurant
- Founded: February 24, 2009 in Fern Creek, Kentucky
- Founder: Kent Taylor
- Headquarters: Fishers, Indiana, United States
- Number of locations: 8 (2009)
- Areas served: Louisville, KY, Amarillo, TX, Irving, TX, San Antonio, TX, Lubbock, TX, Noblesville, IN Greenwood, IN Whitestown, IN Tyler, TX
- Products: Steaks, Salads Chicken, Pasta, Burgers and Seafood
- Owner: Bern Rehberg (President) Steve Madinger (CEO)
- Parent: Ultra Steak
- Website: www.aspencreekgrill.com

Aspen Creek Grill (formerly Aspen Creek) is a restaurant chain with 8 locations.

Aspen Creek's menu centers on steaks, salads, chicken, pasta, burgers and seafood.

Aspen Creek restaurants are located in Louisville, Kentucky; Noblesville, Whitestown, and Greenwood, Indiana; and Amarillo, Irving, Lubbock, and San Antonio in Texas.

== History ==
The first Aspen Creek restaurant was opened in the Louisville suburb of Fern Creek, on February 24, 2009. As its name implies, the store's design is much like a mountain lodge found around Aspen.

It was previously owned by Texas Roadhouse.
