= Clarksville Community School Corporation =

School district in Indiana, United States

Clarksville Community Schools

Location
- Clarksville, Indiana United States
- Coordinates: 38.3020°N 85.7659°W

District information
- Type: Public
- Motto: Discovering excellence
- Grades: Pre-K through 12
- Superintendent: Tina Bennett

Students and staff
- Students: Approx. 1,364

Other information
- Website: www.clarksvilleschools.org

Clarksville Community School Corporation is a public school system serving Clarksville, Indiana. The current enrollment is approximately 1,364 students at three schools. The current superintendent is Tina Bennett.

== Administration ==
Aside from the superintendent and the school administrators, there are five departments within CCSC: Curriculum, Food Service, Transportation, Technology, and Athletics. An elected, five-member school board provides fiscal oversight, among other functions. Security at the CCSC complex is provided by a police officer from the Clarksville Police Department.

== Schools ==
CCSC operates four schools within walking distance of each other and the Administration Building.

- Clarksville Elementary School, formerly Green Acres Elementary School, serving Pre-K through 4th Grade
- Clarksville Middle School, serving 5th through 8th grades
- Clarksville High School, serving 9th through 12th grades
- Renaissance Academy, opened in 2014 is a part of the New Tech Network of schools, which emphasize project-based learning and increased technology application, serving grades 9 through 12.

CCSC formerly operated George Rogers Clark Elementary School, but closed the school in 2010 as a cost-saving measure. To handle the increased population at Clarksville Elementary, fifth grade students were moved to the middle school. The former GRC complex has been sold to a church group.

Three other schools, located within the Clarksville town limits, are not operated by CCSC. Parkwood Elementary School is operated by Greater Clark County Schools. St. Anthony School and Our Lady of Providence Junior-Senior High School are both parochial, co-educational schools operated by the Roman Catholic Archdiocese of Indianapolis.

== 2012–2013 statistics ==
For the 2012–2013 school year, the graduation rate was 98.7%, well above the state average. 89.7% of graduates went on to pursue a college degree, again above the state average. 67.2% of students received free or reduced lunch, also above the state average.

== Athletics ==
Clarksville Middle School and Clarksville high School's sports teams are the Generals. CHS is a part of IHSAA Class 2A, and is a member of the Mid-Southern Conference; they have won the 2013–2014 Class 2A Southridge Regional Championship, and the 2012–2013 Class 2A Crawford County Sectional.
