= Texas Roadhouse =

American chain steakhouse

Texas Roadhouse, Inc.

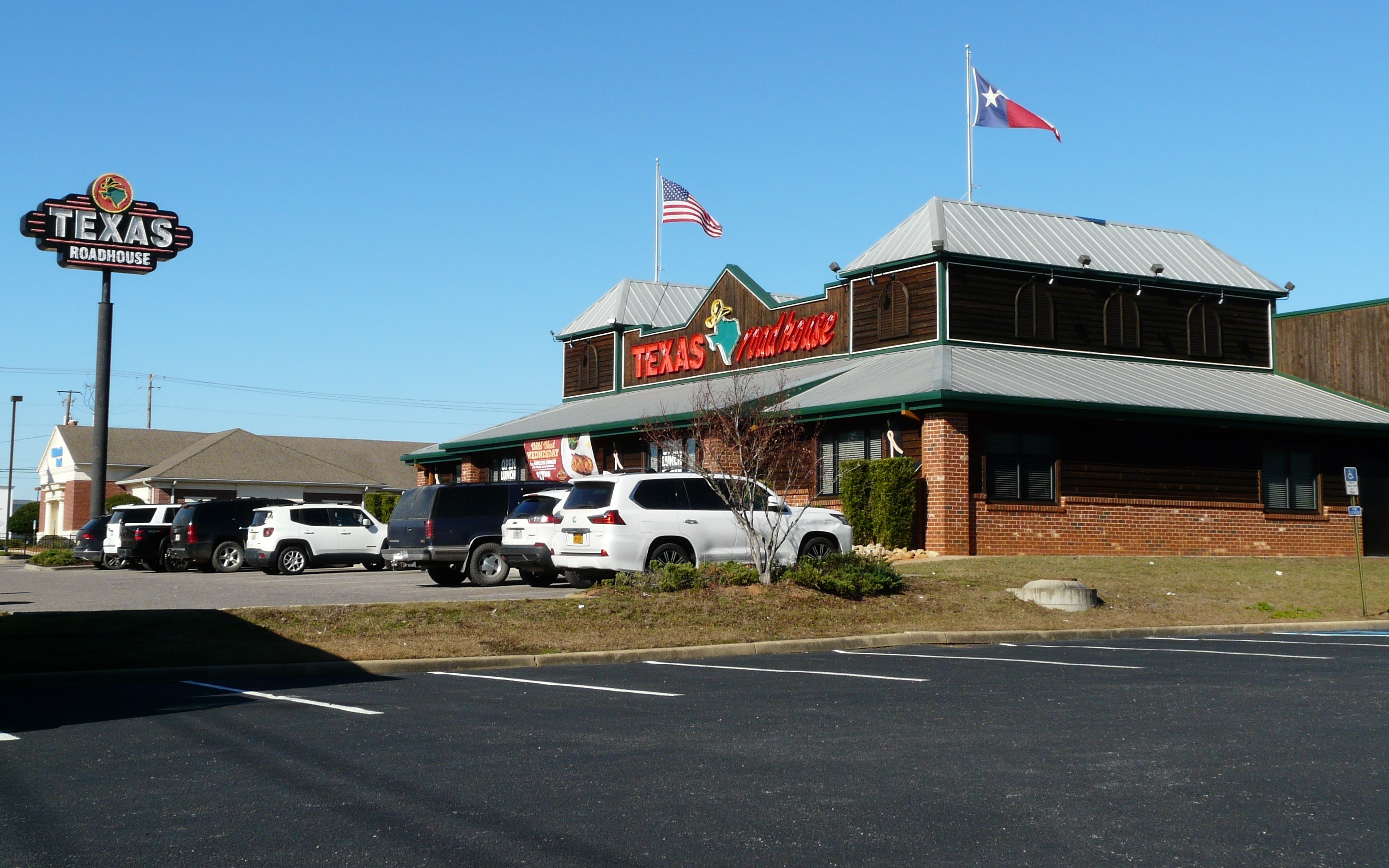
- Texas Roadhouse in Dothan, Alabama
- Type: Public
- Traded as: Nasdaq: TXRH; S&P 400 component
- Industry: Restaurants
- Founded: 1993; 33 years ago in Clarksville, Indiana
- Founder: W. Kent Taylor
- Headquarters: Louisville, Kentucky, U.S.
- Number of locations: 872 (November 2025)
- Area served: United States, Saudi Arabia, Kuwait, Bahrain, United Arab Emirates, Qatar, Philippines, Taiwan, Mexico, China, South Korea and Puerto Rico
- Key people: Jerry Morgan (CEO); Keith Humpich (interim CFO); Hernan Mujica (CIO); Chris Colson (general counsel); Gina Tobin (president); Travis Doster (Chief Communication Officer)
- Products: Steak, ribs, chicken, margaritas, beer, burgers, country dinners, salads, appetizers, combos, desserts, kids' meals, and seafood
- Revenue: ▲US$4.631 billion (2023)
- Operating income: ▲US$186.20 million (2017)
- Net income: ▲US$186.12 million (2017)
- Total assets: ▲US$1.33 billion (2017)
- Total equity: ▲US$839.08 million (2017)
- Number of employees: ~64,900 (2020)
- Website: texasroadhouse.com

Texas Roadhouse is an American steakhouse chain that specializes in steaks in a Texan and Southwestern cuisine style. It is a subsidiary of Texas Roadhouse Inc, which has two other concepts (Bubba's 33 and Jaggers) and is headquartered in Louisville, Kentucky. As of August 2025, the chain operates about 816 locations, 755 of which are domestic locations in 49 U.S. States. 61 international locations located in 10 Foreign Countries and 1 U.S. Territory. There are 684 domestic and 60 international Texas Roadhouses, 56 domestic Bubba's 33, and 15 domestic and 1 international Jaggers.

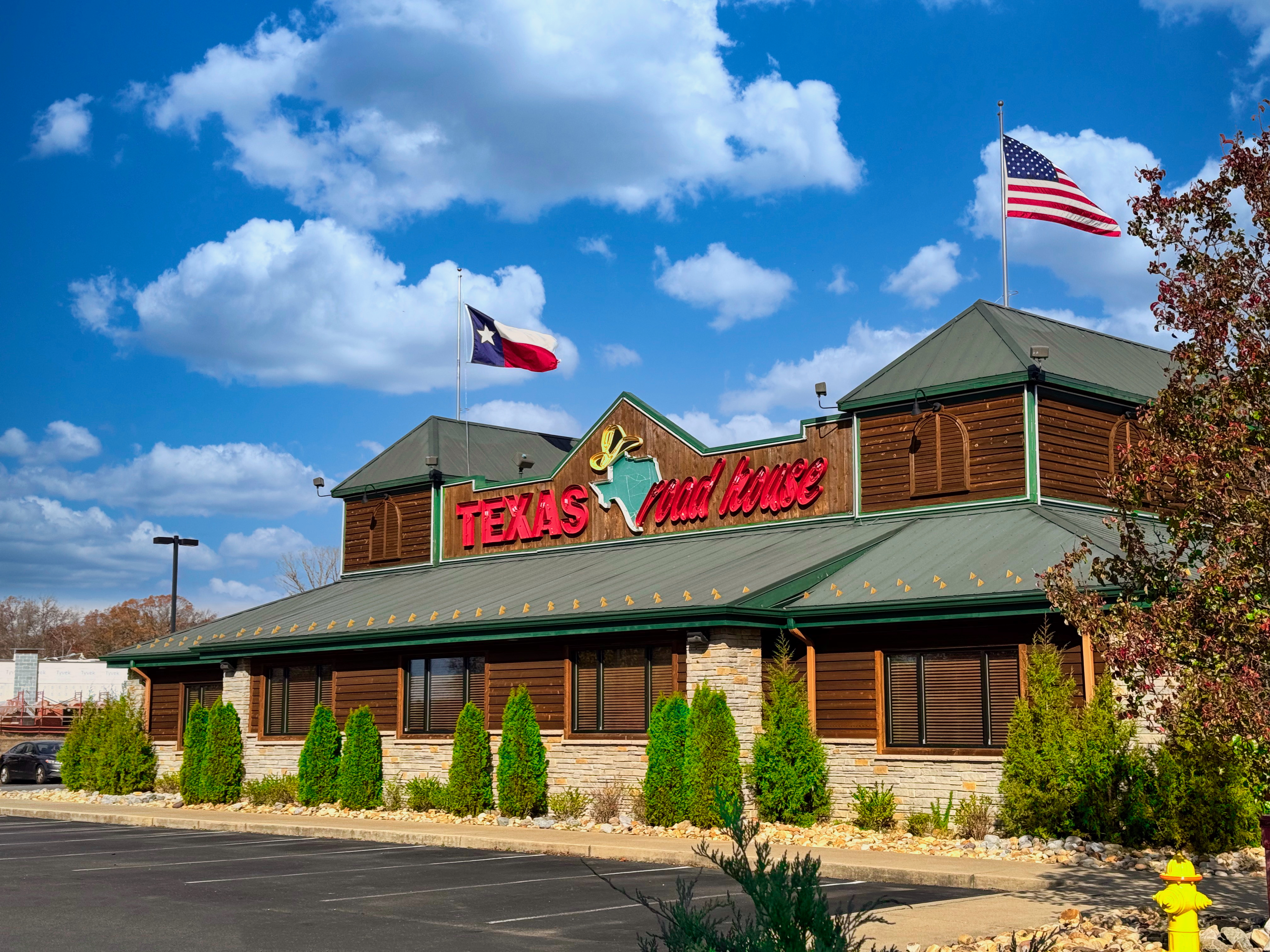
Texas Roadhouse in California, Maryland

== History ==
Texas Roadhouse was established in 1993, at the Green Tree Mall in Clarksville, Indiana, across the Ohio River from Louisville, Kentucky. Founder W. Kent Taylor, a Louisville native, lived in Colorado and worked at nightclubs and restaurants there. In 1990, Taylor returned to his hometown of Louisville, Kentucky. He began work as a Kentucky Fried Chicken manager and had dreams to open a Colorado-themed restaurant. Former Kentucky governor John Y. Brown, Jr. helped Taylor fulfill his dream by backing him with $80,000. In 1991, Taylor opened Buckhead Mountain Grill. Taylor was his own executive chef. Brown invested more money and wanted to open a second store in Clarksville, but complications in the partnership caused it to fall apart.

Brown had elected to pursue another steak concept without Taylor, leaving Taylor with the decision to either stay committed to Buckhead or attempt to start a new business. He decided to go with the latter; however, he had trouble finding investors to help him launch the new concept. Taylor was turned down by many potential investors. Finally, Taylor met a potential investor while he was managing at Buckhead. Dr. John Rhodes became interested in Taylor's proposition of the new steak restaurant concept that Taylor showed to him through drawings on loose papers and cocktail napkins. Taylor was able to convince Dr. Rhodes and two of his colleagues to invest $100,000 each in 1992. A year later on February 17, 1993, the first Texas Roadhouse in Clarksville, Indiana opened its doors. In 1994, Taylor sold his shares in Buckhead Mountain Grill to focus solely on Texas Roadhouse.

In 1993, the second Texas Roadhouse opened in Gainesville, Florida. In 1994, three additional restaurants opened in Cincinnati; Ohio, Clearwater, Florida; and Sarasota, Florida. These three locations would all close because of poor building locations. Kent Taylor was forced to decide how to continue the success of the first two restaurants in Clarksville and Gainesville while dealing with the failures of the three new stores. Taylor decided that better in-store training, building designs, and restaurant decor would help improve Roadhouse's growth. Taylor hired a promising chef who worked in Louisville, Kentucky, Jim Broyles. Broyles was hired as the Director of Food and Beverages and transformed the way Roadhouse prepared and served food. The chain expanded rapidly in the late 1990s, and by the end of 1999, 67 restaurants had been opened. In 2004, Roadhouse became a public company, listing under the symbol "TXRH" on Nasdaq at a price of $17.50 per share and raising $159.3 million. In September 2011, Texas Roadhouse started their international expansion with the first international location in Dubai in the United Arab Emirates. During the COVID-19 Pandemic in 2020, Taylor donated his entire salary and bonus, totaling over $800,000, to his employees.

After struggling with unbearable tinnitus, Taylor died by suicide on March 18, 2021, at the age of 65. It was announced that Jerry Morgan would take over the role of president and CEO.

Taylor's memoir, Made From Scratch: The Legendary Success Story of Texas Roadhouse, was published posthumously.

In April 2025, Texas Roadhouse became the largest casual-dining restaurant chain in the United States according to data from Technomic on the Top 500 largest restaurant chains in the U.S. surpassing previous leader Olive Garden.

=== Finance ===
The key financial trends for Texas Roadhouse, Inc. are as follows, based on fiscal years ending December 31:

Year	Revenue (USD billion)	Gross Profit (USD billion)	Net Income (USD billion)
2001	0.1599	0.1599	0.0073
2007	0.7351	0.1335	0.0393
2014	1.580	0.2903	0.0870
2019	2.762	0.4962	0.1744
2022	4.010	0.6536	0.2698
2024	5.370	0.9473	0.4336
2025	5.878	1.013	0.4335

In the first quarter of 2025, the company posted a 10% year-over-year rise in revenue to nearly $1.5 billion, with earnings per share of $1.70, and same‑store sales growth of 3.5%, outperforming analysts' expectations.

== Competition and business challenges ==
Texas Roadhouse competes with many local restaurants and large restaurant chains, such as Darden Restaurants, Cracker Barrel, and Bloomin' Brands. According to a 2024 GlobalData report, the company competes with other restaurants through food prices, customer service, food quality, menu choices, and convenience. The report also mentions that increasing operating costs and government regulations could affect the company's business and financial performance.

== Animal welfare and sustainability ==
According to Texas Roadhouse Corporate Sustainability Report 2023, Texas Roadhouse is committed to audits by independent third-party auditors ensuring that they adhere to FDA guidelines and also "ensure that the animals are treated with respect and cared for in accordance with the principles of the Farm Animal Welfare Committee (FAWC) and under the guidance of the “Five Freedoms” of animal welfare". These third-party auditors abide by strict guidelines set by a multitude of independent Organizations. These organizations include: The North American Beef Institute (NAMI), National Cattleman's Beef Association (NCBA), Beef Quality Assurance (BQA), National Chicken Council (NCC), United Egg Producers (UEP), and the Pork Quality Assurance Plus (PQA+) Antibiotic Principles for hogs. Texas Roadhouse also prides itself on its 100% Norwegian sourced salmon that are raised free of antibiotics, fed all-natural diets, and provided adequate space for comfortable and natural growth cycles.

== Operations and marketing ==
A Texas Roadhouse location in Angeles City, Philippines

Texas Roadhouse's mission statement is "Legendary Food, Legendary Service". Their mascot is an armadillo named Andy. The company's restaurants offer entertainment in the form of line dancing. The waiters, waitresses and hosts perform these dances throughout the night. The employees participate in intercompany competitions: bartenders compete in "The Real Bar" competition, and meat cutters in the annual "Meat Hero Competition".

The Roadhouse Corporation supports the homebuilding programs Habitat for Humanity International and Homes For Our Troops. The company also sponsors a road cycling team of about 20 cyclists. Texas Roadhouse is a major supporter of Special Olympics.

Each restaurant had a table called "Willie's Corner", with pictures and memorabilia of Willie Nelson. In 2002, Nelson signed a deal to become an official partner of Texas Roadhouse. Since then, Nelson has heavily promoted the chain, including a special on Food Network. Willie Nelson is the owner of Texas Roadhouse in South Austin, TX.

A half slab of ribs

== Cuisine ==
Texas Roadhouse serves Texan and American cuisine, including steak, ribs, chicken, and seafood. The restaurant is known for its steaks, which are hand-cut daily and cooked to order on gas-fired grills. Its menu also includes pork chops, pulled pork, hamburgers, sandwiches, salads, and vegetable plates.

== See also ==
- Aspen Creek Grill, restaurant chain formerly owned by Texas Roadhouse
