= Green Tree Mall =

Shopping mall in Clarksville, Indiana, United States

Coordinates: 38°19′01″N 85°45′55″W

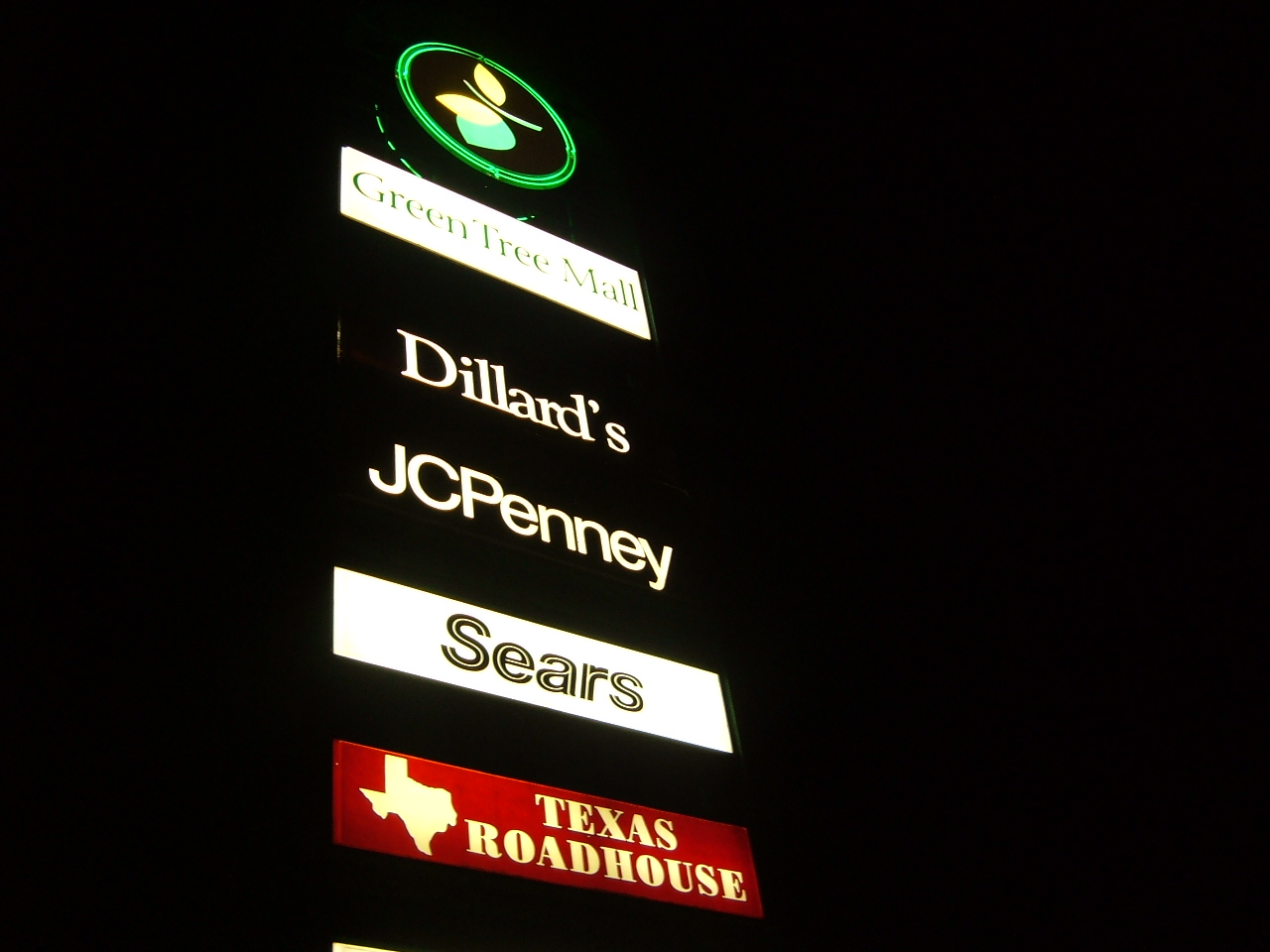
- Road sign for Green Tree Mall, 2004
- Location: Clarksville, Indiana, United States
- Opened: December 24, 1968
- Developer: Roger Smith
- Manager: Namdar Realty
- Owner: Namdar Realty
- Num. of stores: 81
- Num. of anchor tenants: 3
- Floor area: 793,837 sq ft (73,749.9 m^{2})
- Floors: 1 (staff mezzanine in JCPenney)
- Website: greentreemall.com

Green Tree Mall is a shopping mall located in Clarksville, Indiana, United States. The mall is located off of I-65 about four miles (6 km) north of downtown Louisville. It has a total area of 795,382 square feet (73,893 m^{2}). It was named for a large boundary tree of considerable age that once stood at the location. Currently, there are more than 80 inline stores and 2 major anchor stores (Dillard's and JCPenney). The third anchor was Sears which closed on October 1, 2017. The mall is managed by Namdar Realty. Green Tree Mall is a retail anchor for the Clarksville area.

== History ==
The first store to open at the mall was a Sears department store, which opened on September 29, 1966. The rest of the mall opened for business in 1968, including JCPenney and a Danners dime store Prentice sold the mall in 1977 to Macerich. JCPenney and Sears remain at their original locations and Dillard's anchors the back annex.

The first Texas Roadhouse opened in 1993 and operated at the mall until 2026. Ben Snyder's department store was an original anchor. When Hess's purchased the Ben Snyder's chain, the company built a new store instead, and the former Ben Snyder's location became a food court. Hess's store is now Dillard's. The food court proved unsuccessful and was later known as Tumble Station before becoming a martial arts school in 2016.

Macerich sold the mall in June 2013 to CBL Properties. It was sold again to Centennial Realty in 2021. It was sold again in 2023 to Namdar realty according to Www.greentreemall.com.

On July 7, 2017, it was announced that Sears would be closing as part of a plan to close 43 stores nationwide. The store closed in October 2017.

== Gallery ==
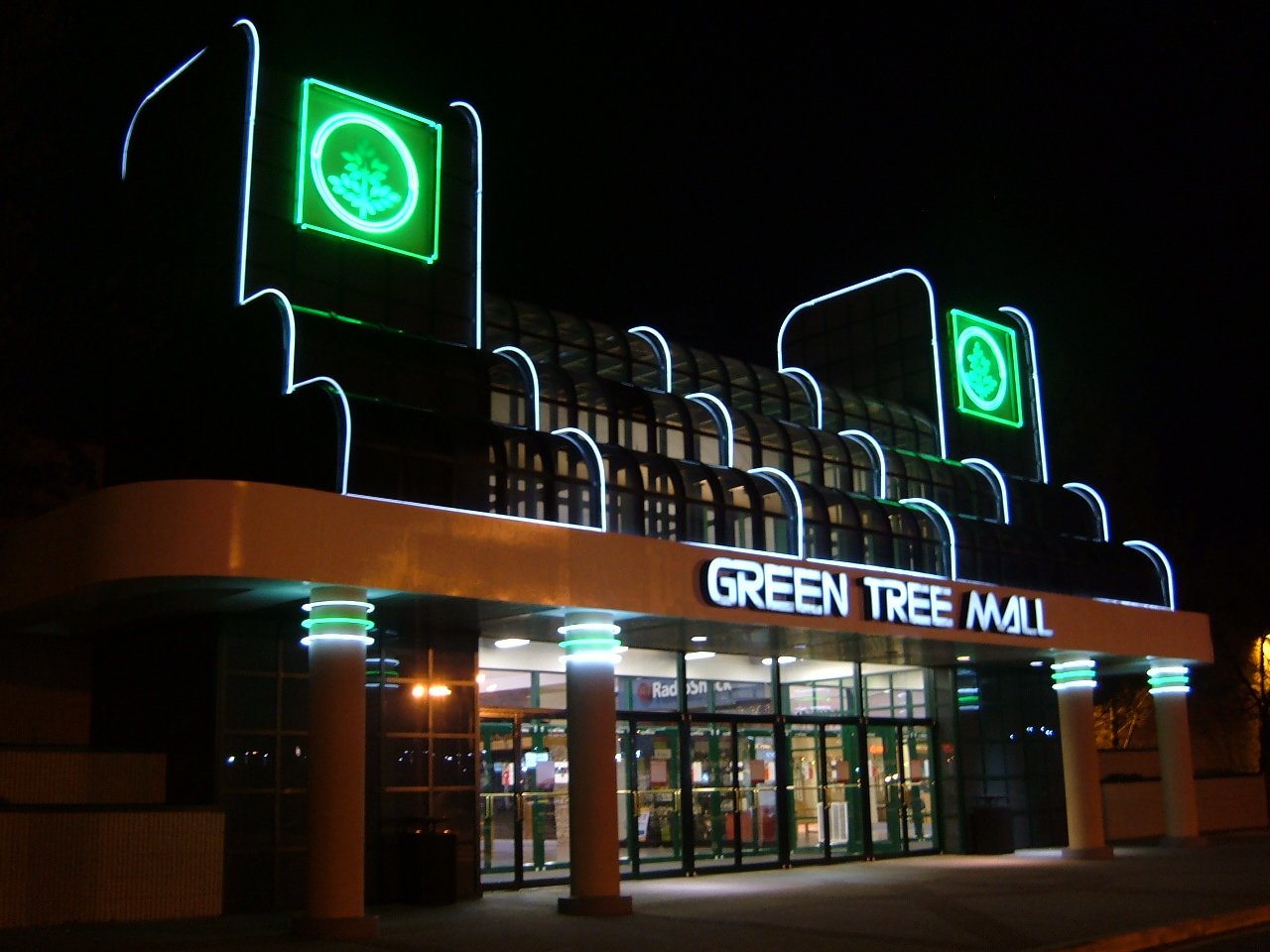
Main entrance of the mall at night

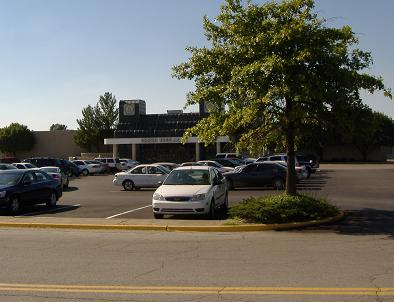
Front of Green Tree Mall

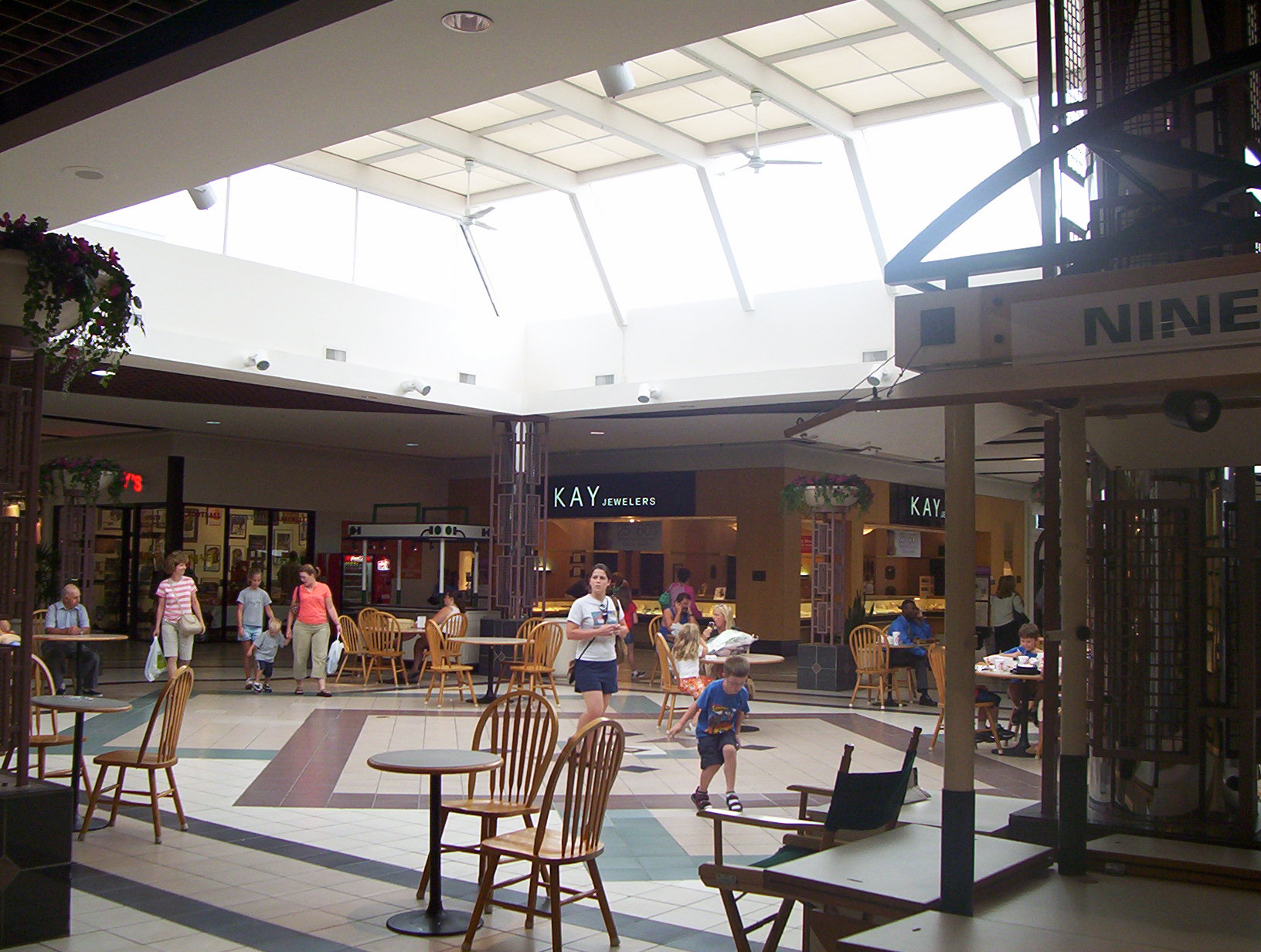
Center Court

== See also ==
- River Falls Mall
- List of shopping malls in the United States
