= Mid Mon Valley Transit Authority =

- Founded: April 3, 1962
- Headquarters: 1300 McKean Ave. Charleroi, Pennsylvania
- Service area: Washington County, Pennsylvania; Westmoreland County, Pennsylvania; Fayette County, Pennsylvania
- Service type: Bus
- Routes: 7
- Fuel type: CNG
- Website: mmvta.com

The Mid Mon Valley Transit Authority is a public transportation service that is located in Washington County, Westmoreland County, and a small portion of Fayette County in Pennsylvania. It provides inter-city bus and paratransit service to select communities within the area.

The Mon Valley region is located within the metropolitan (but, except for Finleyville, not the urban) area of Pittsburgh; however, daily bus routes are provided to the city, with hourly service for much of the day on Monday through Friday.

== Route List ==
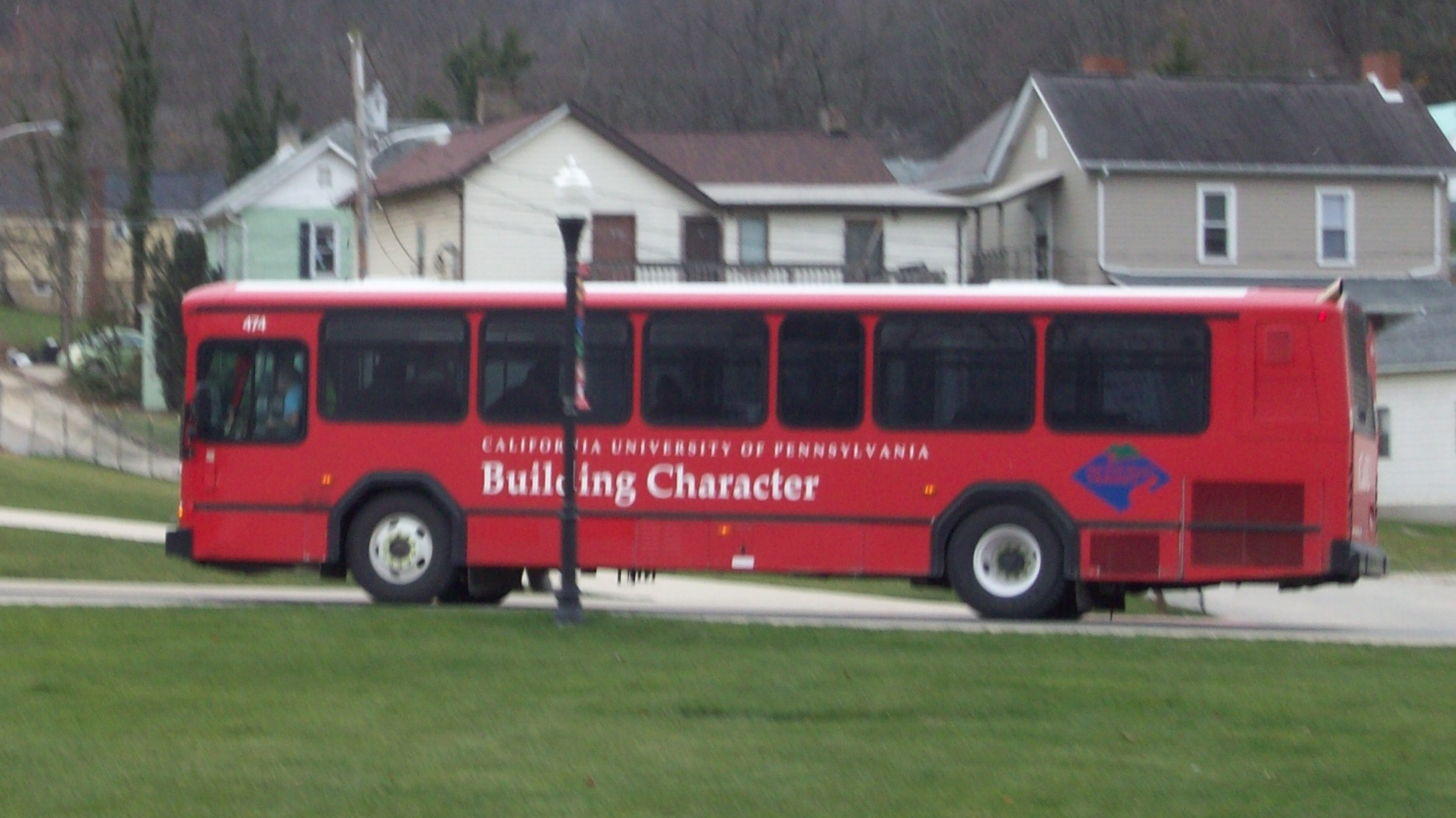
MMVTA Silver Line (now Valley 3) at the edge of campus, California University of Pennsylvania

Effective October 1, 2022 the MMVTA revamped their entire route system.

- Commuter A- Donora, Monessen, Charleroi, North Charleroi, Fisher Heights (Carroll Township), Monongahela, New Eagle, Crookham Park & Ride (Union Township), Finleyville to Downtown Pittsburgh (7 days)
- Commuter Express 1- Donora, Monongahela, New Eagle to Downtown Pittsburgh (M-F, limited stops)
- Commuter Express 2- Donora, Monessen, Charleroi to Downtown Pittsburgh (M-F, limited stops)
- Cal Commuter- Downtown Pittsburgh, Large Park & Ride (Jefferson Hills) to California University of Pennsylvania (weekday rush)
- Local 1- New Eagle, Monongahela, Mon Valley Hospital, Fisher Heights Giant Eagle (Carroll Township), Charleroi, North Charleroi, Lower Belle Vernon, North Belle Vernon to Rostraver Township Shopping Centers (M-F)
- Local 2- West Brownsville Walmart, California University of Pennsylvania, California Borough, Elco, Roscoe, Stockdale, Allenport, Dunlevey, Charleroi to Rostraver Township shopping centers, Donora Monongahela, New Eagle (M-F)
- Local 3- Mon Valley Hospital, Fisher Heights Giant Eagle (Carroll Township), Donora, Monessen, Rostraver Shopping centers (M-F)
- Local 4- (Formerly Weekender 1) New Eagle, Monongahela, Donora, Monessen, Rostraver Shopping Centers (Weekends only)
- Local 5- (Formerly Weekender 2) West Brownsville Walmart, California Borough, Elco, Roscoe, Stockdale, Allenport, Dunlevey, Charleroi, North Charleroi, Lower Belle Vernon, N. Belle Vernon, Rostraver Shopping Centers (weekend only)

== Park & Ride Lots ==
- California University of Pennsylvania (California)- 71 spaces (Cal Commuter, Local 2, Local 5)
- Chamber Plaza (Charleroi)- 50 spaces (Commuter A, Commuter Express 2, Local 1, Local 2, Local 5)
- Crookham (Union Township)- 50 spaces (Commuter A)
- Large (Jefferson Hills)- 400 space lot owned by Port Authority of Allegheny County (Cal Commuter)
- MMVTA Transit Center (North Charleroi)- 10 spaces (Commuter A, Commuter Express 2, Local 1)
