= Old Time Pottery =

Discount retailer

- Company type: Private
- Industry: Retail
- Founded: 1986
- Founder: Jack Peterson
- Headquarters: Murfreesboro, Tennessee, US
- Number of locations: 34 (2023)
- Area served: Florida, North Carolina, Ohio, Indiana, Illinois, Missouri, Alabama, South Carolina, Tennessee, Georgia, Virginia and Oklahoma
- Key people: Scott Peterson (CEO)
- Products: Home decor, wall decor, home textiles, bed & bath products, kitchen products, rugs
- Owner: Gabe's
- Website: Old Time Pottery

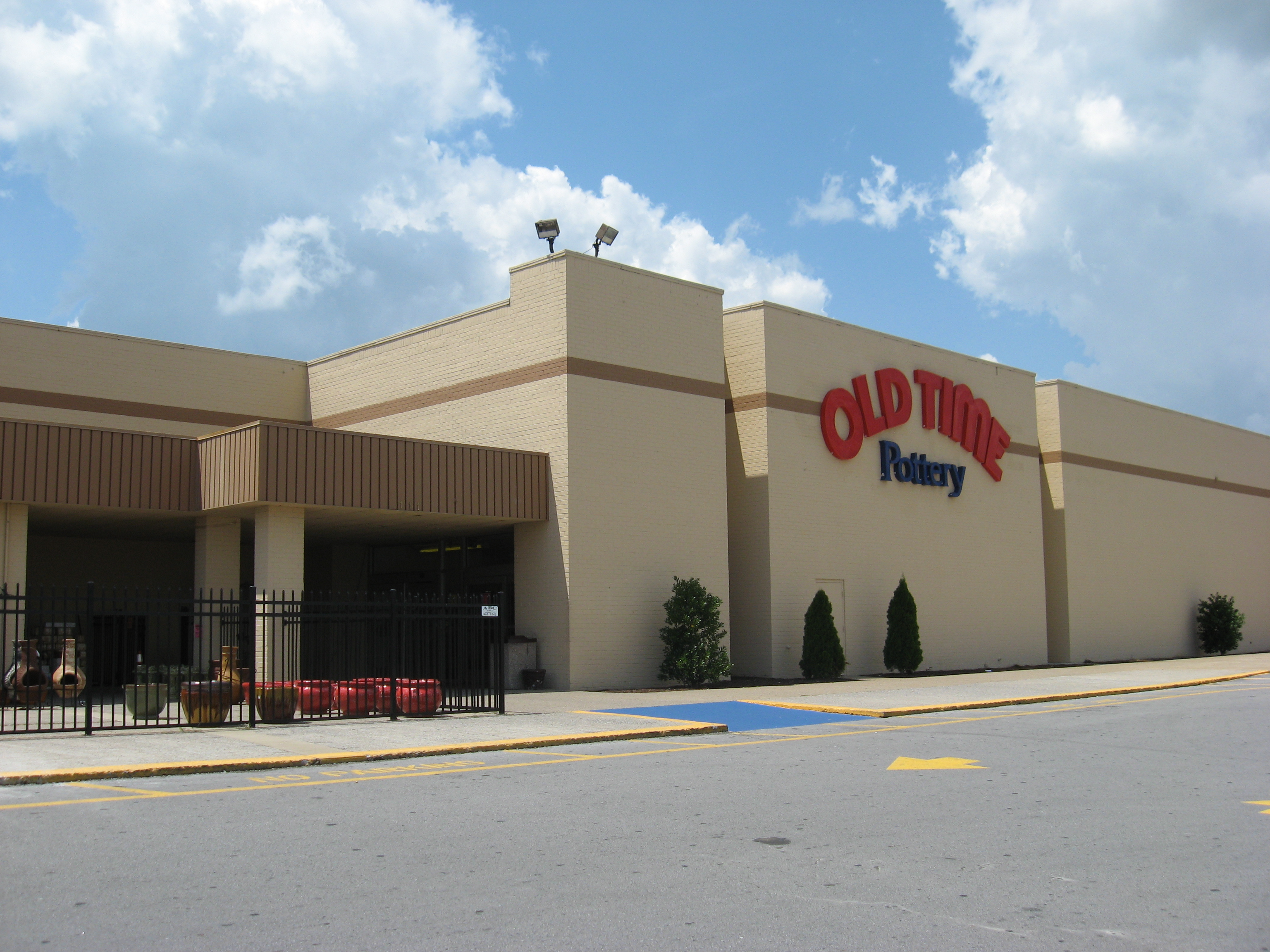
Old Time Pottery in Madison, Tennessee

Old Time Pottery is a discount home décor retailer based in Murfreesboro, Tennessee, United States.

== History ==
Old Time Pottery was founded in 1986 by Jack Peterson in Murfreesboro, Tennessee. It initially only sold pottery items but later expanded to include other home décor and furniture products.

In August 2009, Old Time Pottery filed for Chapter 11 bankruptcy and later announced the closure of 8 stores that eventually closed in early 2010.

In June 2020, Old Time Pottery filed for Chapter 11 bankruptcy again, blaming the COVID-19 pandemic. The company announced the closure of some of its locations in an effort to restructure its debt. In April 2023, the home merchandise chain was acquired by Gabe's, an off-price retailer headquartered in Morgantown, West Virginia.
