= Clarksville, Indiana =

- Town
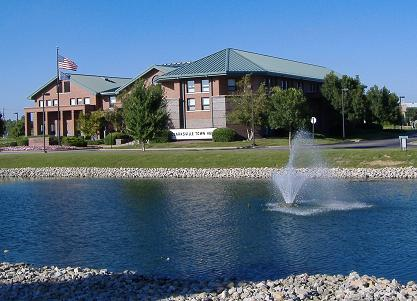
- Clarksville Town Hall

- Flag

- Location of Clarksville in Clark County, Indiana.
- Coordinates: 38°21′02″N 85°46′02″W
- Country: United States
- State: Indiana
- County: Clark
- Townships: Silver Creek, Jeffersonville
- Established: 1783

Government
  - Type: Town Council
  - President: Ryan Ramsey

Area
  - Total: 10.24 sq mi (26.51 km^{2})
  - Land: 10.04 sq mi (26.00 km^{2})
  - Water: 0.20 sq mi (0.51 km^{2})
- Elevation: 469 ft (143 m)

Population (2020)
  - Total: 22,333
  - Density: 2,225/sq mi (858.9/km^{2})
- Time zone: UTC−5 (EST)
  - Summer (DST): UTC−4 (EDT)
- ZIP codes: 47129
- Area codes: 812 & 930
- FIPS code: 18-12934
- GNIS feature ID: 2396649
- Website: townofclarksville.com

Clarksville is a town in Clark County, Indiana, United States, along the Ohio River and is a part of the Louisville Metropolitan area. The population was 22,333 at the 2020 census. The town was founded in 1783 by early resident George Rogers Clark at the only seasonal rapids on the entire Ohio River, it is the oldest American town in the former Northwest Territory. The town is home to the Colgate clock, one of the largest clocks in the world and the Falls of the Ohio State Park, home to the world's largest exposed Devonian period fossil bed.

== History ==
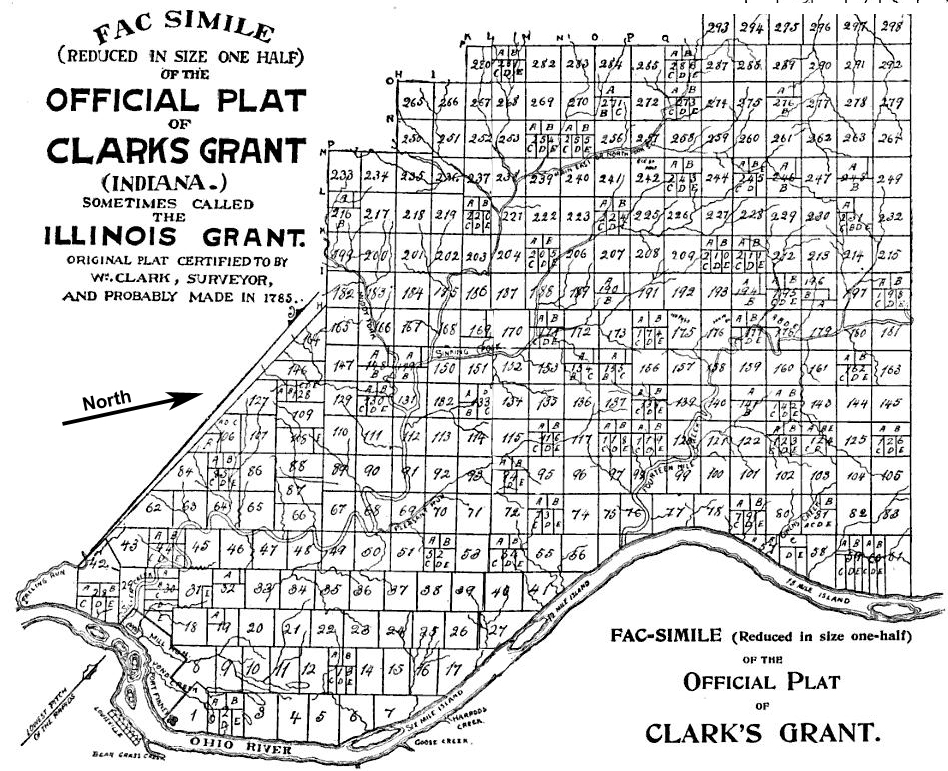
Original plat of Clark's Grant

The site that would become Clarksville was first used as a base of operations by George Rogers Clark during the American Revolutionary War. In 1778 he established a post on an island at the head of the Falls of the Ohio, from which he trained his 175-man regiment. After the war, Clark was granted a tract of 150,000 acres (610 km^{2}) for his services in the war. In 1783, 1,000 acres (4 km^{2}) were set aside for the development of a town, Clarksville. The same year a stockade was built and settlement began.

The explorer William Clark was a younger brother of George Rogers Clark. Historian Stephen Ambrose writes of Meriwether Lewis and William Clark in Undaunted Courage, "When they shook hands [at Clarksville], the Lewis and Clark Expedition began." A two-figure statue near the falls commemorates the expedition. Several localities other than Clarksville claim precedence for the start of the Lewis and Clark Expedition, most notably St. Louis, Missouri.

Due to the many floods in the nineteenth century and the Indiana Canal Company's failed competition to build a canal around the Ohio Falls, the town struggled. On August 24, 1805, the Indiana Territorial Legislature authorized the construction of a canal around the Falls of the Ohio at Clarksville. The first attempt failed and the investors lost their money. Historians believe it was used to finance the conspiracy of Aaron Burr. Developers tried to build a canal in 1817 and again in 1820. But the race to build the canal was lost in 1826 when the federal government made a large grant to build the Louisville and Portland Canal. The lack of a canal handicapped the growth of the town as the Falls of the Ohio made river transport from the city difficult.

Clarksville became a popular dueling spot for Kentuckians who wanted to dodge their home state's anti-dueling laws. The most famous of these was the 1809 duel between Henry Clay and Humphrey Marshall. There was an attempt to build a second town within Clarksville's boundaries, named Ohio Falls City, until the Indiana Supreme Court ruled that this would be illegal.

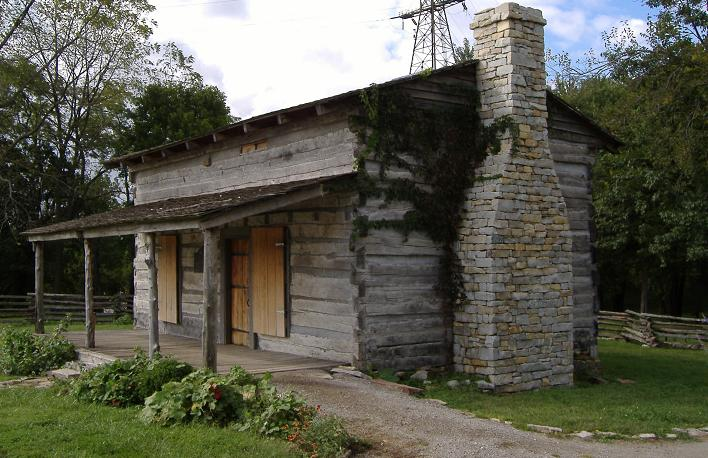
George Rogers Clark cabin along the Ohio River

The town was managed by a ten-member Board of Trustees in the charter from Virginia. The trustees were allowed to align lots along roads and sell the lots for the proceeds to benefit the town. The trustees could elect replacements as needed and did not have to reside in the town. This remained controversial with residents until 1889 when the board stopped meeting and was replaced by a three-member board. One member was selected by the Floyd County Commissioners, one by the Clark County Commissioners, and one by residents of Clarksville. Between 1889 and 1937, the town established a five-member board entirely elected by residents. The historic records related to this governmental change were lost in the Ohio River flood of 1937.

The Great Flood of 1937 decimated the town. The entire town was submerged beneath as much as 12 feet (3.7 m) of water in some areas for over three weeks during January and February. With almost all of the old town destroyed, Clarksville was rebuilt with a new modern city plan.

The post-World War II housing boom and new jobs brought growth to the city. The population increased from 2,400 in 1940 to 22,000 in 2000. The city has expanded to the north by annexing several sizable suburbs. By 1981 the State of Indiana changed statutes to convert the managing board of trustees to a council with members rather than trustees. In 1990 voters approved expansion of members of the Town Council from five to seven following the area growth.

== Geography ==
According to the 2010 census, Clarksville has a total area of 10.17 square miles (26.34 km^{2}), of which 9.97 square miles (25.82 km^{2}) (or 98.03%) is land and 0.2 square miles (0.52 km^{2}) (or 1.97%) is water.

== Demographics ==
Historical population
Census	Pop.	Note	%±
1880	1,037		—
1890	1,692		63.2%
1900	2,370		40.1%
1910	2,743		15.7%
1920	2,322		−15.3%
1930	2,243		−3.4%
1940	2,386		6.4%
1950	5,905		147.5%
1960	8,088		37.0%
1970	13,298		64.4%
1980	15,164		14.0%
1990	19,833		30.8%
2000	21,400		7.9%
2010	21,724		1.5%
2020	22,333		2.8%
Source: US Census Bureau

=== 2020 census ===
As of the 2020 census, Clarksville had a population of 22,333. The median age was 39.1 years. 22.3% of residents were under the age of 18 and 18.2% of residents were 65 years of age or older. For every 100 females there were 91.1 males, and for every 100 females age 18 and over there were 87.6 males age 18 and over.

100.0% of residents lived in urban areas, while 0.0% lived in rural areas.

There were 9,282 households in Clarksville, of which 28.5% had children under the age of 18 living in them. Of all households, 37.1% were married-couple households, 20.4% were households with a male householder and no spouse or partner present, and 33.2% were households with a female householder and no spouse or partner present. About 34.3% of all households were made up of individuals and 15.0% had someone living alone who was 65 years of age or older.

There were 10,033 housing units, of which 7.5% were vacant. The homeowner vacancy rate was 1.2% and the rental vacancy rate was 9.9%.

Racial composition as of the 2020 census
Race	Number	Percent
White	17,003	76.1%
Black or African American	1,594	7.1%
American Indian and Alaska Native	192	0.9%
Asian	231	1.0%
Native Hawaiian and Other Pacific Islander	6	0.0%
Some other race	1,528	6.8%
Two or more races	1,779	8.0%
Hispanic or Latino (of any race)	2,741	12.3%

=== 2010 census ===
As of the census of 2010, there were 21,724 people, 9,175 households, and 5,464 families living in the town. The population density was 2,178.9 inhabitants per square mile (841.3/km^{2}). There were 9,839 housing units at an average density of 986.9 per square mile (381.0/km^{2}). The racial makeup of the town was 85.1% White, 5.6% African American, 0.3% Native American, 0.7% Asian, 5.7% from other races, and 2.5% from two or more races. Hispanic or Latino of any race were 9.5% of the population.

There were 9,175 households, of which 29.9% had children under the age of 18 living with them, 39.0% were married couples living together, 14.5% had a female householder with no husband present, 6.0% had a male householder with no wife present, and 40.4% were non-families. 33.8% of all households were made up of individuals, and 13.9% had someone living alone who was 65 years of age or older. The average household size was 2.34 and the average family size was 2.98.

The median age in the town was 37.3 years. 22.9% of residents were under the age of 18; 9.5% were between the ages of 18 and 24; 27.5% were from 25 to 44; 24.8% were from 45 to 64; and 15.2% were 65 years of age or older. The gender makeup of the town was 48.0% male and 52.0% female.

=== 2000 census ===
As of the census of 2000, there were 21,400 people, 8,984 households, and 5,561 families living in the town. The population density was 2,120.6 inhabitants per square mile (818.8/km^{2}). There were 9,537 housing units at an average density of 945.1 per square mile (364.9/km^{2}). The racial makeup of the town was 90.56% White, 5.59% African American, 0.27% Native American, 0.93% Asian, 0.03% Pacific Islander, 1.08% from other races, and 1.53% from two or more races. Hispanic or Latino of any race were 2.80% of the population.

There were 8,984 households, out of which 28.4% had children under the age of 18 living with them, 44.4% were married couples living together, 13.3% had a female householder with no husband present, and 38.1% were non-families. 31.6% of all households were made up of individuals, and 13.2% had someone living alone who was 65 years of age or older. The average household size was 2.32 and the average family size was 2.92.

In the town, the population was spread out, with 23.1% under the age of 18, 9.9% from 18 to 24, 29.8% from 25 to 44, 22.0% from 45 to 64, and 15.2% who were 65 years of age or older. The median age was 36 years. For every 100 females, there were 91.1 males. For every 100 females age 18 and over, there were 87.8 males.

The median income for a household in the town was $35,473, and the median income for a family was $44,688. Males had a median income of $30,860 versus $23,329 for females. The per capita income for the town was $20,315. About 5.6% of families and 8.1% of the population were below the poverty line, including 10.5% of those under age 18 and 6.7% of those age 65 or over.

== Attractions ==
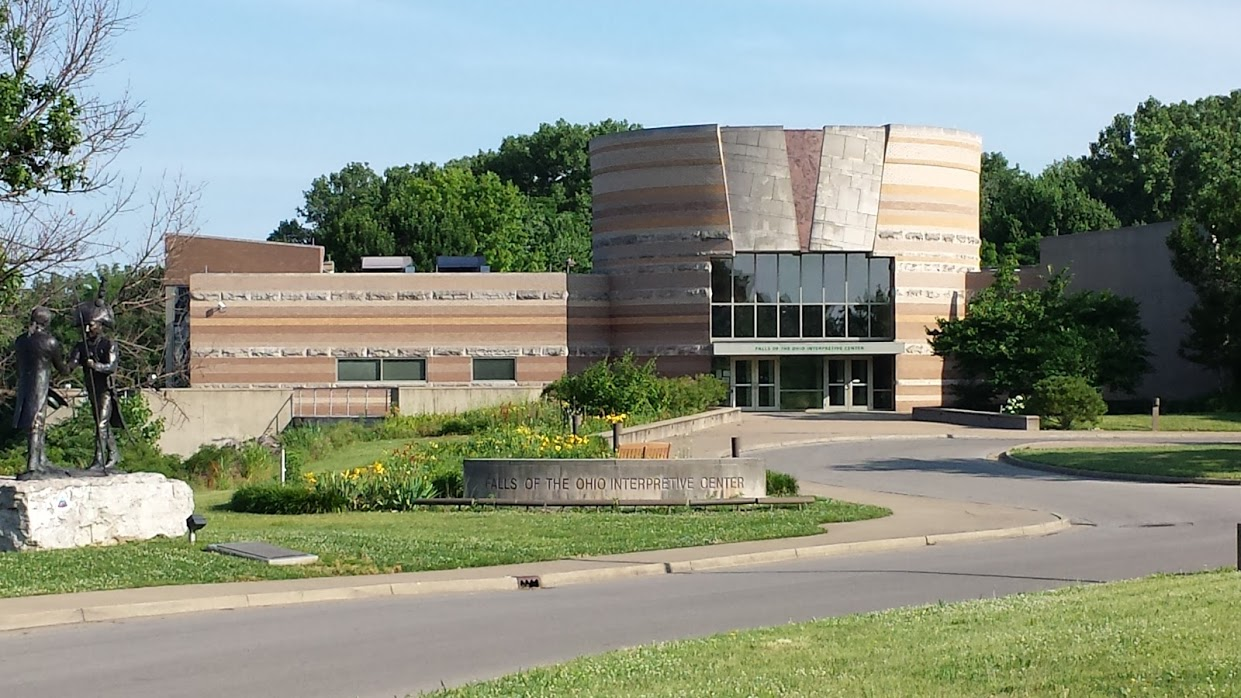
The Falls of the Ohio Interpretive Center located next to the Ohio River fossil beds

Clarksville has the largest exposed fossil beds from the Devonian period. This area has now been incorporated in the Falls of the Ohio State Park, where the state has built an education center. The fossils include plant and marine life from a prehistoric coral reef that are 386 million years old.

Several other local parks included sports fields, such as the 332-acre (1.3 km^{2}) Lapping Park, which contains a golf course, a Disc Golf course, soft ball field, shelter house, amphitheater, and hiking trails.

The city has the "7th largest clock in the world", at the former Colgate-Palmolive Plant near the Ohio River. Many locals still mistakenly claim it as the "2nd largest clock in the world", but it was surpassed years ago. As the Colgate company closed the plant in early 2008, the clock's future was in question. The town has vowed to keep the clock in its current location, which can be seen from across the river in downtown Louisville, Kentucky.

The Clarksville Little Theater is one of the oldest continuously running community theaters in the United States. Also located here is Derby Dinner Playhouse, the only dinner theater in the area.

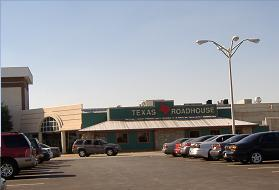
First Texas Roadhouse at the Green Tree Mall

Clarksville is home to several churches, including Southeast Christian Church, Faith Assembly Church, St. Anthony Parish, and Seven Pillars Church International.

The restaurant chain Texas Roadhouse first started in Clarksville, and its original location is open as an outlet at the Green Tree Mall. Clarksville is the home of the United States's second-largest Bass Pro at the River Falls Mall.

== Education ==
Clarksville Community School Corporation, Greater Clark County Schools, and West Clark Community Schools serve sections of Clarksville.

== Notable people ==
- John James Audubon spent considerable time here, as he made many of his bird fieldbook sketches at the Falls of the Ohio.
- Tony Bennett, former Indiana Director of Education
- Frank Kimmel, a NASCAR driver, was born and lives in Clarksville.
- Mickie Knuckles, female professional wrestler, born in Clarksville
- Rose Will Monroe, aka Rosie the Riveter

== Twin cities ==
The Clarksville sister or twin city program began in 1998. Bewdley and Melton Mowbray in the UK were the first sister cities to begin friendship ties in 1998 and 1999 and relations have continued. Most recently La Garenne-Colombes in Paris urban area, France joined the sister cities of Clarksville.

- Bewdley, Worcestershire, United Kingdom
- Melton Mowbray, Leicestershire, United Kingdom
- La Garenne-Colombes, Île-de-France, France

== Gallery ==
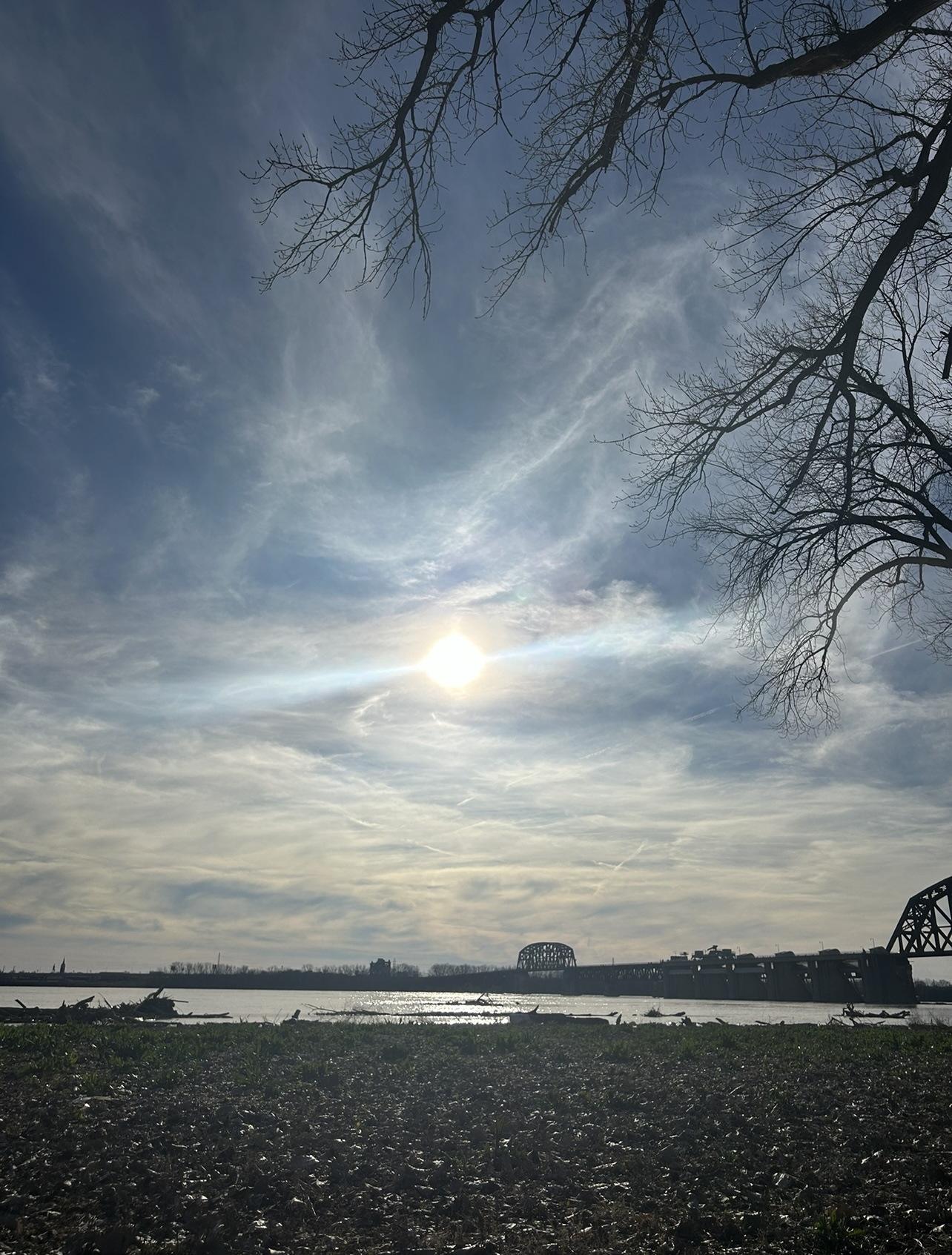
Ohio River Greenway, Clarksville, IN. Overlooking Fourteenth Street Bridge and Ohio River.

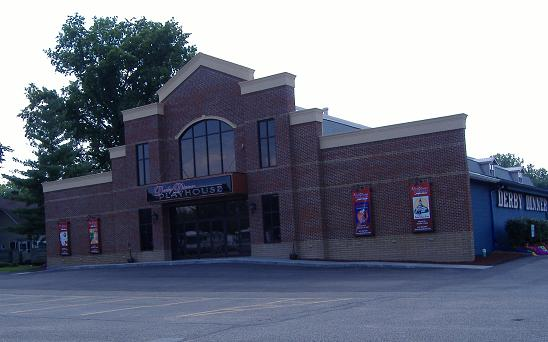
Derby Dinner Playhouse

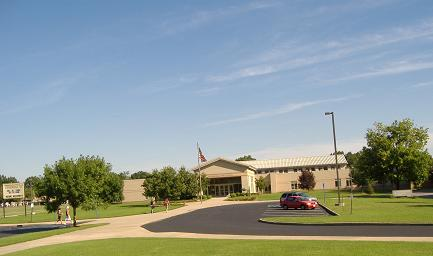
Clarksville High School

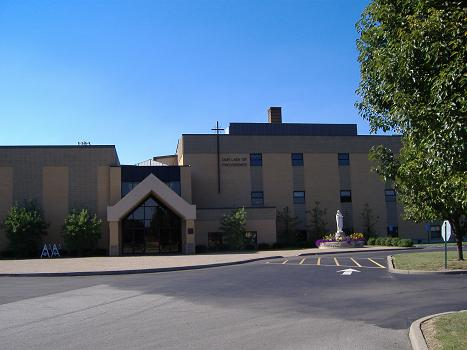
Providence High School

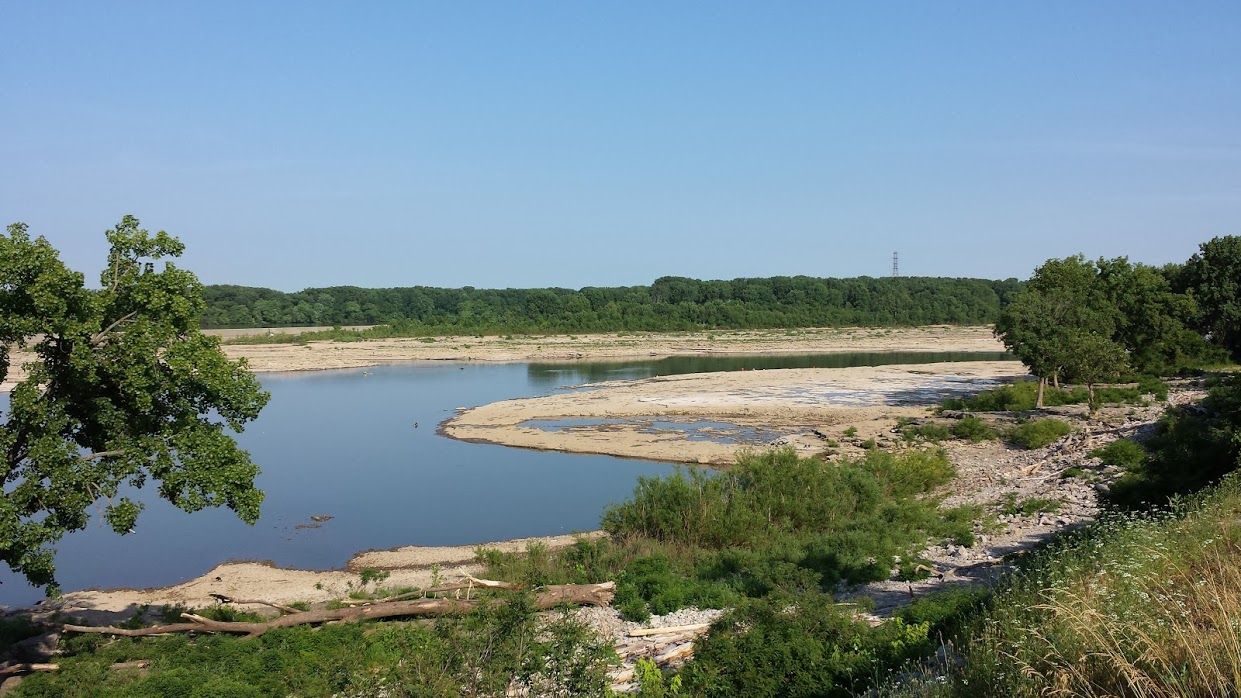
World's largest exposed Devonian fossil bed is at Clarksville's Falls of the Ohio State Park

== See also ==
- Clarksville Senior High School
- Clarks Hill, Indiana, a community in Tippecanoe County originally named Clarksville
- John Minta
- List of cities and towns along the Ohio River
