= Gabe's =

American retail chain

Gabriel Brothers, Inc.
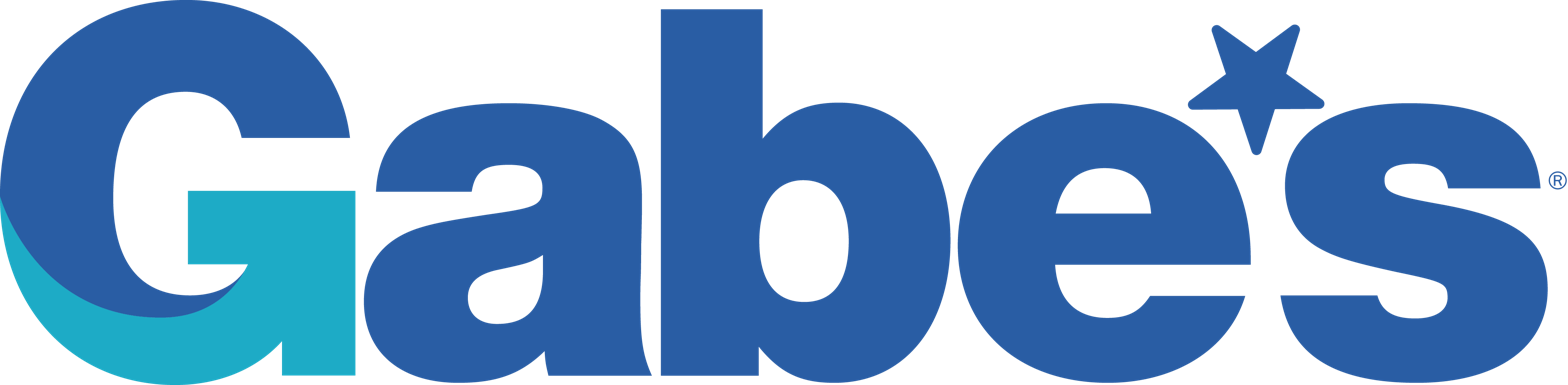

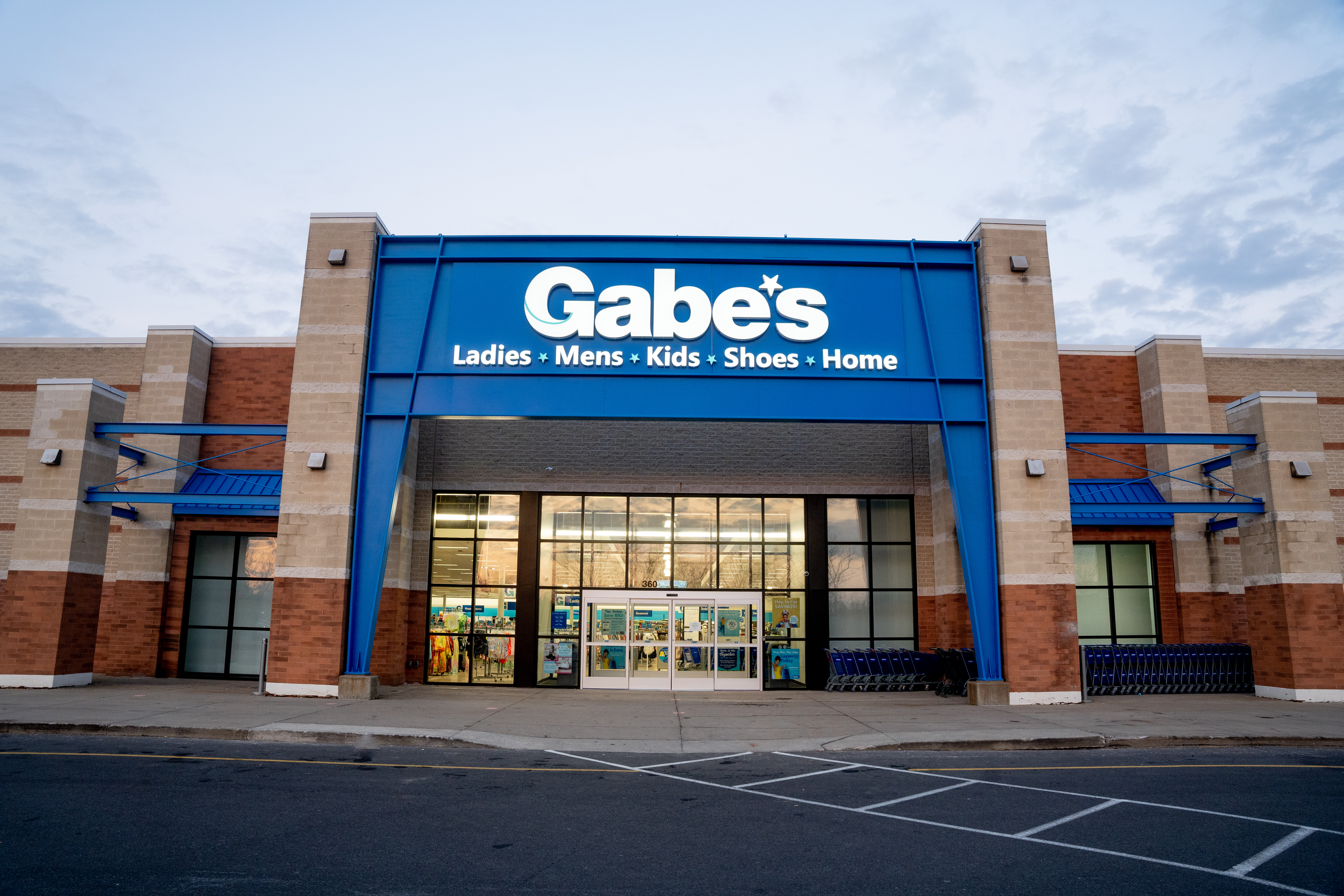
- Exterior of a Gabe's store in Elyria, Ohio (a former Dick's Sporting Goods)
- Trade name: Gabe's
- Formerly: Gabriel Brothers; (1961–2013)
- Company type: Private
- Industry: Retail
- Founded: 1961 (65 years ago) in Morgantown, West Virginia
- Founders: Jamarah Gabriel; Arthur Gabriel
- Headquarters: 55 Scott Avenue; Morgantown, West Virginia; U.S.
- Number of locations: ▲131 stores (April 2023)
- Area served: Alabama, Delaware, Florida, Georgia, Illinois, Indiana, Kentucky, Maryland, Michigan, Missouri, New Jersey, New York, North Carolina, Ohio, Oklahoma, Pennsylvania, South Carolina, Tennessee, Virginia, West Virginia
- Key people: Jason Mazzola (CEO)
- Products: Clothing and accessories, footwear, beauty and health products, bedding, housewares, furniture, food, small electronics, pet supplies, toys
- Revenue: ▲US$1 billion (2021)
- Owner: Alvarez & Marsal Capital (majority; 2012-2016); Warburg Pincus (majority; 2016-present); Gabriel family (minority; 2012-present)
- Number of employees: 8,000 (2023)
- Subsidiaries: Old Time Pottery
- Website: www.gabesstores.com

Gabriel Brothers, Inc. (doing business as Gabe's) is an American off-price department store chain headquartered in Morgantown, West Virginia, United States. As of 2023, there are 131 Gabe's stores and 38 Old Time Pottery stores across 20 states, with the support of six distribution centers serving the Mid-Atlantic, Midwest, and Southeast.

== History ==
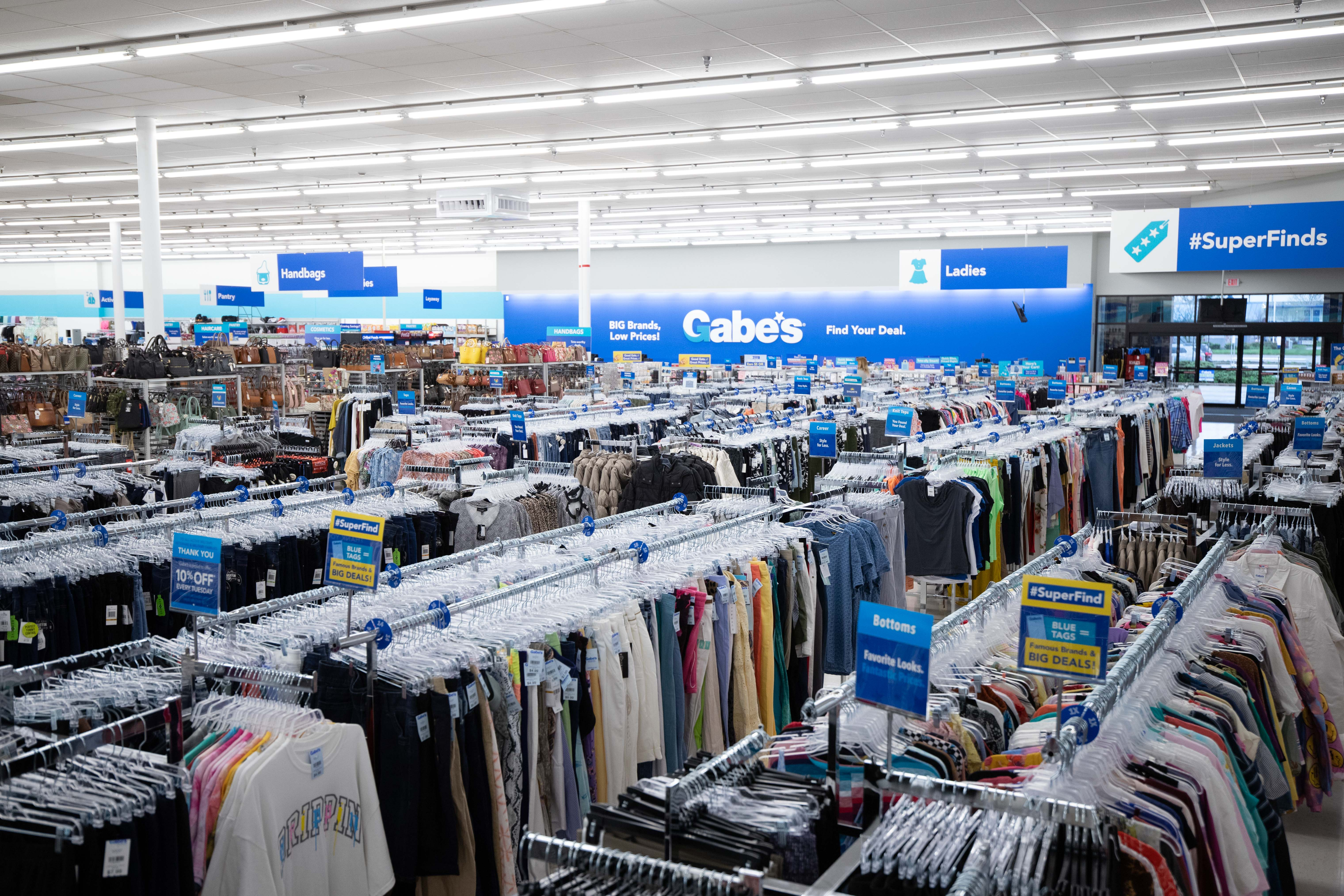
Interior of a Gabe's store in Perrysburg, Ohio

In the early 1920s, Zaghieb G. "Z.G." Gabriel began selling merchandise out of the back of a green-paneled truck he had outfitted with shelves and drawers. As he drove his mobile shop through the coal towns of Fayette County, Pennsylvania, he greeted and got to know his customers, seeing firsthand the need for inexpensive merchandise. Z.G. began to hop freight trains bound for New York City, taking empty duffle bags with him. There, he would buy up excess inventory from shops, returning with bags full of merchandise to sell at deep discounts.

In 1961, Z.G.'s two sons, James and Arthur, co-founded Gabriel Brothers in Morgantown, West Virginia. Through the 1980s and 1990s, the brothers led Gabe's through an expansion into various states including Maryland, Ohio, and Virginia.

On March 21, 2012, the Gabriel family sold its majority interest in the company to Alvarez & Marsal Capital, a New York City-based middle-market private equity firm. In 2013, the stores were rebranded as "Gabe's", but retained "Gabriel Brothers" as its legal name.

On December 22, 2016, Alvarez & Marsal Capital sold their stake to Warburg Pincus, a private equity firm also based in New York City.

In April 2023, Gabe's acquired the Tennessee-based, home merchandise chain Old Time Pottery.

As of 2024, there are 131 Gabe's and 34 Old Time Pottery store locations in 20 states: Alabama, Delaware, Florida, Georgia, Illinois, Indiana, Kentucky, Maryland, Michigan, Missouri, New Jersey, New York, North Carolina, Ohio, Oklahoma, Pennsylvania, South Carolina, Tennessee, Virginia, and West Virginia.
