= The Mall at Partridge Creek =

- Location: Clinton Township, Macomb County, Michigan, United States
- Coordinates: 42.626°N 82.946°W
- Opened: October 18, 2007; 19 years ago
- Developer: Taubman Centers
- Manager: Spinoso Real Estate Group
- Num. of stores: 80+
- Num. of anchor tenants: 1 (1 open, 2 under construction)
- Floor area: 640,000 square feet (59,457.9 m^{2})
- Floors: 1
- Parking: 3,250
- Website: www.shoppartridgecreek.com

The Mall at Partridge Creek is an open-air shopping center in Clinton Township, a suburb of Detroit, Michigan, United States. The mall opened to the public on October 18, 2007. The mall features the large-scale traditional retailer L.L.Bean in addition to a Cooper's Hawk, P. F. Chang's, and a large 14-screen MJR Theatres. The mall also features prominent specialty retailers such as Evereve, Lululemon Athletica, Dry Goods, Lush Cosmetics, and White House Black Market.

The Mall at Partridge Creek feature, pop jet fountains, a 40' fireplace, a TV court, and welcomes dogs and provides four dog comfort stations on site.

== History ==
The Mall at Partridge Creek was developed by Taubman Centers of Bloomfield Hills, Michigan and opened on October 18, 2007. It is also the first mall to open in Macomb County since Lakeside Mall in 1976. The mall has reported an average sales per square foot of $539, among the highest in the nation and well above the threshold for 'class A' mall properties.

On April 18, 2008, Nordstrom opened, the second anchor store at the mall.

On January 31, 2013, Parisian became Carson's.

The state's first L.L.Bean opened in the center court in August 2016.

On April 17, 2018, the closure of all Carson's stores was announced, due to bankruptcy. On July 19, 2023, it was announced that Powerhouse Gym would open in the former Carson's anchor building.

In June 2019, it was announced that Nordstrom would close their anchor store.

By 2023, since the government lockdown, The Mall at Partridge Creek announced several newest additions, among them are Versona, Evereve, Cato, Buckle, Lovisa, JD Sports, and BoxLunch.

On July 15, 2025, Apple announced that it would be closing in mid-August, ahead of the store's opening in Downtown Detroit. The store closed on August 16, 2025.

== About the mall ==
The mall features around 80 shops and restaurants. Tenants of the mall include L.L.Bean, Eddie Bauer, Starbucks. The mall features a 14-screen MJR movie theater; a snow-melt system on the sidewalks; an outdoor play area.

The mall (and most of the stores) is billed as dog friendly, and the mall itself maintains a dog/owner code of conduct and a list of dog friendly stores. It joins at least 38 other pet friendly malls in the United States.
