= MAX Credit Union =

Credit union in Alabama, US

. MAX Credit Union is a state-chartered credit union based in Montgomery, Alabama. MAX Credit Union operates 18 locations in five counties in Central and East Alabama and as of January 2021 had US$1.77 billion in assets and 116,418 member owners. MAX is ranked the 5th largest credit union in Alabama in asset size and the 212th largest credit union in the US in asset size. MAX provides consumer and commercial financial services and is regulated and insured by the National Credit Union Administration (NCUA).

== History ==
MAX Credit Union was originally founded as Maxwell Federal Credit Union, a federally-chartered financial institution, on 27 April 1955 by 16 Air Force employees and enlisted personnel at Maxwell Air Force Base in Alabama. Maxwell Federal Credit Union opened for business on 27 June 1955. Membership was open to military and civil service personnel on Maxwell and Gunter Air Force Bases (now Gunter Annex) and only loans and savings accounts were offered. Maxwell Air Force Base Director of the Management and Training office Mamie S. Maples was the first president of the board of directors of Maxwell Federal Credit Union. The credit union had 144 customers and $62,000 in assets on 31 Dec 1955. Assets totalled $1 million in June 1963, $100 million in June 1982, and $200 million in May 1985.

In June 1960, the credit union's name changed from Maxwell Federal Credit Union to Maxwell-Gunter Federal Credit Union and branches were opened on Maxwell and Gunter Air Force bases, in Prattville and at Montgomery Mall. In 1979 the credit union opened a fifth location at Eastdale Mall in Montgomery and began offering checking accounts.

Maxwell-Gunter Federal Credit Union was renamed MAX Federal Credit Union in 1985. New branches were opened on Zelda Road and Vaughn Road in Montgomery in March 1985 and October 1986, and in the Retirement Systems of Alabama (RSA) building in March 1996. In June 1997, MAX opened a branch in Wetumpka, Alabama.

On 25 February 1998, MAX Federal Credit Union received a community charter, which allowed anyone who lived, worked, or attended school in Montgomery, Autauga, and/or Elmore counties in Alabama to open accounts at MAX. MAX Federal Credit Union members voted to become a state-chartered financial institution in November 2007; this allowed the credit union to expand operations outside of the Montgomery Metropolitan Statistical Area (MSA). The credit union's name then changed to MAX Credit Union.

Since 2007, MAX Credit Union has opened eight new locations in Montgomery, Prattville, Millbrook, Auburn, Opelika, Tallassee, and Troy, Alabama. MAX Credit Union opened MAX Leasing USA, a subsidiary commercial leasing company, in February 2009.

== Products and services ==
MAX Credit Union offers personal and business banking products and services.

== Community involvement ==
The MAX4Kids Foundation is a non-profit organization created in 2001 by MAX associates to raise funds for charitable organizations. As of January 2019, the MAX4Kids Foundation had donated over $1,000,000 to the MAX4Kids Scholarship Program and children's charities in the River Region and East Alabama.
