= Meridian Mall =

Coordinates: 42.724885°N 84.418774°W

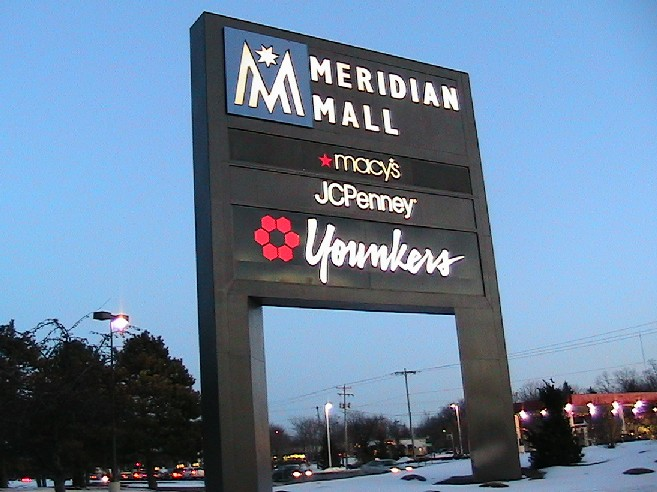
- Meridian Mall entrance sign along Grand River Avenue (2010)
- Location: Meridian Charter Township (Okemos), Michigan, United States
- Address: 1982 West Grand River Avenue
- Opened: November 6, 1969; 57 years ago
- Developer: M.H. Hausman Co.
- Manager: CBL Properties
- Owner: CBL Properties
- Num. of stores: 125
- Num. of anchor tenants: 8
- Floor area: 997,128 sq ft (92,636 m^{2}).
- Floors: 1 (2 in Dick's Sporting Goods and former Younkers Women's)
- Public transit: CATA
- Website: www.meridianmall.com

Meridian Mall is a super-regional shopping mall located in Okemos, Meridian Township, a suburb of Lansing, Michigan, United States.

It opened in 1969, the same year as its main competitor, Lansing Mall, on the other end of the Lansing metropolitan area. The mall originally featured the J.W. Knapp Company and Woolco as its anchor stores, and underwent many expansions over the years. A G. C. Murphy dime store was subdivided for additional mall space in 1979, while J.W. Knapp sold its store to JCPenney a year later. Expansions in 1982 and 1987 added two more wings of stores anchored by Hudson's (later Marshall Field's, now Macy's) and Mervyn's, while the closure of Woolco allowed for the addition of a food court and Service Merchandise. Further renovations at the beginning of the 21st century relocated the food court and replaced Service Merchandise with Jacobson's, while also adding Galyan's (now Dick's Sporting Goods) and several other big-box stores. After only two years in business, the Jacobson's store closed and converted to Younkers; following the closure of Mervyn's in 2006, Younkers expanded its presence in the mall by moving some departments into that space, until parent company The Bon-Ton filed for bankruptcy in 2018 and closed all stores. Ashley HomeStore opened a store in the former Younkers on November 8, 2025.

Meridian Mall features about 125 stores and a food court, plus a movie theater on its periphery. The mall's anchor stores are High Caliber Karting and Entertainment, JCPenney, Launch Trampoline Park, Macy's, Schuler Books & Music, Ashley HomeStore, and Dick's Sporting Goods. Other major tenants include H&M and Planet Fitness. Meridian Mall is owned and managed by CBL Properties, which has owned it since 1998.

== History ==
Meridian Mall was built by the M.H. Hausman Company and opened to the public on November 6, 1969. The mall was built at the northwest corner of Grand River Avenue (M-43) and Marsh Road in Meridian Charter Township. Originally, the mall featured two anchor stores: the Lansing-based J.W. Knapp Company (Knapp's) and Woolco, a discount department store then owned by the F. W. Woolworth Company. Major tenants at the time included the Meridian 4, a four-screen movie theater multiplex operated by American Multi-Cinema (now AMC Theatres), along with a G. C. Murphy dime store, a Cunningham Drug pharmacy, and a Hamady supermarket. Two local restaurants, Schensul's Cafeteria and Elias Brothers Big Boy, also had locations in the mall.

The Hamady store was closed in 1972 and remained vacant until 1976, when it was converted to a second movie theater complex that also featured four screens. This newer theater became known as Meridian East 4, while the existing ones were renamed Meridian West 4. In 1979, the G. C. Murphy store was closed and its space was divided into a new mall section consisting of twelve shops, known as "The Court". Among the first stores to open in The Court were CardAmerica, Casual Corner, and MC Sports.

=== The 1980s ===
J. W. Knapp filed for bankruptcy in 1980 and sold all three of its shopping mall stores (in Meridian Mall, Lansing Mall, and Jackson's Westwood Mall) to JCPenney. A new wing was added to the south end of Meridian Mall in 1982, bringing in the Detroit-based Hudson's as a third anchor. New tenants in the Hudson's wing included several clothing stores and a Foot Locker, while the existing mall was refurbished with new planters, flooring, seating, skylights, and canopies over the mall entrances. Later in 1982, the F. W. Woolworth Company closed all stores in the Woolco division, and in 1983, the vacated Woolco space was subdivided for a 50,000-square-foot (4,600 m^{2}) Service Merchandise catalog showroom, a food court, and a mall corridor with space for up to fifteen more tenants. Among these tenants was a local 18,000-square-foot (1,700 m^{2}) men's clothing and sporting goods store known as B. Altman's. A 1987 expansion added another new wing ending in a Mervyn's department store. The store opened concurrently with seven others in the state, one of which was located at Lansing Mall, as part of the chain's introduction to Michigan. This addition at Meridian Mall included more than ten new storefronts, including Lerner New York (now known as New York & Company), LensCrafters, Babbage's (now known as GameStop), and new locations for Gantos and County Seat.

=== 1990s-early 2000s ===
Meridian Mall side entrance from west end of building

By 1993, expansions at Lansing Mall had created significant competition between the two malls; that year, the approximately 60 businesses had stores at both malls, and 40 unique to each. One of the few renovations to Meridian Mall during the 1990s came in 1995, when Hobie's restaurant was removed from the food court to accommodate more seating. Additions in 1996 included Abercrombie & Fitch, Select Comfort, and the first Kirkland's home furnishings store in Michigan.

On August 27, 1998, CBL & Associates Properties (now known as CBL Properties) acquired Meridian Mall. Immediately afterward, several new tenants joined the mall, including The Children's Place, Mrs. Fields, Braun's Fashions (now known as Christopher & Banks), and the first Ann Taylor and Old Navy stores in the Lansing area. Service Merchandise closed its Meridian Mall store in early 1999. A $20 million mall renovation began in 2000, which added new floor tiles, skylights, seating areas, and restrooms, along with many new stores. One of the key tenants in this renovation plan was a two-story Jacobson's department store, which opened in early 2000 on the former site of Service Merchandise, and replaced an existing Jacobson's in downtown East Lansing. In addition, Bed Bath & Beyond built a store in the same wing, the food court was relocated to center court, and the Hudson's was expanded by 50,000 square feet (4,600 m^{2}). Shortly after receiving the expansion, Hudson's was renamed to Marshall Field's when parent company Target Corporation began consolidating the names of its department stores. The new food court opened in November 2000, with restaurants including A&W, Sbarro, Olga's Kitchen, Panda Express, and Arby's. The remaining restaurants from the old food court stayed until year's end, when that space was removed for Schuler Books & Music, replacing their previous location across the street. Galyan's, a sporting goods store based in Indiana, opened next to the new food court in 2002. Coinciding with the addition of these stores, the mall also added Suncoast Motion Picture Company, Steve & Barry's, Hollister Co., and an AT&T Wireless store, while Bailey Banks & Biddle, MC Sports, and several locally owned stores closed. The site occupied by Galyan's was originally to have been occupied by a new multiplex theater, but this was canceled due to concerns that major theater chains were overbuilding. Prior to the renovation, both of the existing theaters in the mall had closed: Meridian East 4 in December 1999, and Meridian West 4 in July 2000.

Jacobson's declared bankruptcy in 2002 and closed. A year later, its building was tenanted by Younkers, which also opened at Lansing Mall the same year. Due to space limitations in the old Jacobson's, Younkers operated its men's and children's departments in a newly created, adjacent storefront. This expansion displaced the mall offices, which operated out of a temporary location in the Mervyn's wing for a short time, until the Steve & Barry's store was relocated to the JCPenney wing and the previous location was remodeled into a new mall office.

=== Mid 2000s-2020s ===
In 2004, Dick's Sporting Goods acquired and renamed all of the Galyan's stores. Two more changes came to the mall's anchors in 2006; first, in early 2006, Mervyn's closed all of its Michigan stores, and later the same year, Marshall Field's was one of several chains to be acquired and renamed by Macy's. Younkers expanded its presence at the mall in mid-2008 by moving its men's clothing, children's clothing, and furniture departments into the vacated Mervyn's space, while retaining women's clothing and accessories at the existing store. This two-store concept, referred to by parent company The Bon-Ton as a "dual anchor", alleviated the congested layout of the existing store, while allowing a greater variety of merchandise to be offered between the two locations. Steve & Barry's closed at the mall in September 2008.

The former Meridian Mall Outer 6 AMC movie theater on the mall's periphery closed its doors on September 5, 2011. The theater reopened in December 2012 as Studio C!, offering drinks and made-to-order food ordered and served at patrons' seats. In late 2013, plans were approved to add H&M and Gordmans to the mall sometime in 2014. Planet Fitness and Shoe Carnival both opened in the Macy's wing in late 2013. On April 29, 2017, Gordmans closed their Meridian Mall location due to bankruptcy. Launch Trampoline Park was announced as its replacement in mid-2018. The Bon-Ton filed for bankruptcy in mid-2018, and began liquidation of all its stores, including both Younkers locations at Meridian Mall. In mid-2019, High Caliber Karting and Entertainment announced that it would open in the former Younkers Men's & Home store. The complex features indoor kart racing, axe throwing, bowling, and arcade games as well as a bar and restaurant. High Caliber Karting & Entertainment expanded its complex at Meridian Mall into the former location of Old Navy in early 2020 after that chain closed its Meridian Mall store.

On June 23, 2020, JCPenney announced that it would be closing as part of a plan to close thirteen stores nationwide after filing for Chapter 11 bankruptcy. However, JCPenney cancelled the store's closing in early July. Bed Bath & Beyond closed in 2023 after filing for bankruptcy. In March 2024, Schuler Books' owners confirmed they would be relocating into the former Bed Bath & Beyond location. In February 2025, Ashley HomeStore announced that a location would be opened in May in the former Younkers location. It opened on November 8, 2025.

On May 30, 2025, the mall experienced a shooting in the parking lot outside of Dick's Sporting Goods in which 2 people sustained gunshot wounds. The suspect was arrested later on May 30 and was arraigned June 1 on counts of assault with intent to murder, carrying a concealed weapon and felony firearm. The suspect, a 19 year old woman has her bond set at 1 Million dollars according to the Ingham County District Court.
