= Montgomery Mall =

Montgomery Mall can refer to the following:

- Montgomery Mall (Alabama) in Montgomery, Alabama
- Montgomery Mall (Pennsylvania) in North Wales, Pennsylvania
- The former name of Westfield Montgomery in Montgomery County, Maryland
