= Sarasota Square Mall =

Former shopping mall in Sarasota, Florida

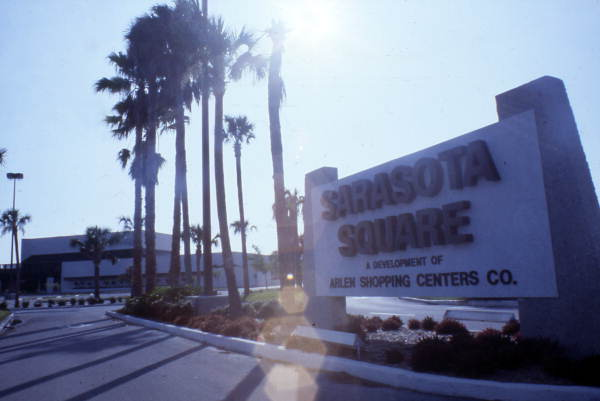
- Exterior of Sarasota Square Mall in the 1980s
- Location: Sarasota, Florida; United States
- Coordinates: 27.2342°N 82.493°W
- Address: 8201 South Tamiami Trail
- Opened: September 28, 1977
- Closed: December 2024
- Previous names: Westfield Shoppingtown Sarasota Square (2003–2005); Westfield Sarasota Square (2005–2019)
- Developer: Arlen Realty and Development Corporation
- Owner: Torburn Partners
- Public transit: Breeze Transit
- Website: www.sarasotasquaremall.com

Sarasota Square Mall (also known as Westfield Shoppingtown Sarasota Square and Westfield Sarasota Square) was a shopping mall near Sarasota, Florida on the northwest corner of U.S. Route 41 and Beneva Road. It opened in September 1977 and closed in late 2024. The mall was demolished in February 2025 with its anchor stores, Costco and JCPenney, operating as freestanding stores.

== History ==
=== Planning and construction ===
Arlen Realty and Development Corporation, a predecessor of CBL & Associates Properties, announced Sarasota Square Mall in 1976. The mall was planned to be anchored by Maas Brothers and JCPenney, the latter of which would relocate from nearby Southgate Shopping Plaza (which was an outdoor strip mall at the time). The mall would also include J. Byrons as a smaller anchor and a six-screen movie theater. Additional space was left on the north side for an additional large anchor. Maas Brothers, J. Byrons, and an AMC movie theater opened on August 4, 1977.

=== Opening and early years ===
Sarasota Square officially held its grand opening on September 28, 1977, and JCPenney opened the same day. JCPenney was located on the south side of the mall, and Maas Brothers and J. Byrons were located across from each other in the center. The movie theater was located within the mall on the northeast corner. Other early tenants in the mall included Camelot Music, Kinney Shoes, and Morrison's Cafeteria.

Sears built a store at Sarasota Square on the additional anchor space on the north side, which opened on October 24, 1979.

AMC opened a second six-screen theater in 1983 in a separate building on the northeast corner of the mall property, giving the mall 12 screens. AMC named the new theater "Sarasota Square 6 East", while the existing theater inside the mall was renamed "Sarasota Square 6 West".

J. Byrons closed in 1985, and its space was converted into the Trellis Garden Food Court, which opened in March 1986. An expansion from the food court east began construction in 1986, which included a fourth anchor, Parisian, which was the store's second location outside its home state of Alabama. Parisian opened on November 1, 1989.

In 1991, Maas Brothers was merged with Burdines by the parent company of the two stores. Despite the fact that Burdines operated a store nearby at Southgate, the company retained its store at Sarasota Square. The Maas Brothers store was officially rebranded as Burdines on October 20, 1991. Along with the rest of the Burdines chain, the Sarasota Square store was renamed Burdines-Macy's on January 30, 2004, as the brands were merged by their parent company. On March 6, 2005, the Burdines name was officially dropped and the stores were fully merged into Macy's.

In 1995, it was reported that Parisian had planned to sell its store to Dillard's. According to the plan, if Dillard's failed to acquire the Parisian store, it would instead build its own store adjacent to JCPenney, and the Parisian site would be sold to Jacobson's. Ultimately, Parisian closed in January 1996, and Dillard's opened in the former Parisian building on March 2, 1996.

=== Westfield acquisition ===
Westfield Group acquired the mall in 2003 from then-owners Coyote Group, and renamed it Westfield Shoppingtown Sarasota Square. The "Shoppingtown" was dropped in June 2005. In 2006, Westfield refurbished both the interior and exterior of the mall. A new 12-screen AMC theater was built between Dillard's and JCPenney, along with a new adjoining food court. The theater opened on December 20, 2006. The two previous six-screen theaters were closed, and the Trellis Garden Food Court was remodeled to include more store space.

Dillard's closed its Westfield Sarasota Square store, along with the DeSoto Square store in Bradenton on December 5, 2009. The Sarasota Square store was demolished and replaced with a Costco, which opened on August 17, 2012.

In July 2019, Unibail-Rodamco-Westfield announced the shopping center would be renamed "Sarasota Square", dropping Westfield from its name and returning it to its original name before the group's acquisition of the property.

=== Decline and closure ===
In 2015, Sears Holdings spun off 235 of its properties, including the Sears at Westfield Sarasota Square, into Seritage Growth Properties. In 2017, Macy's and Sears announced their stores at Sarasota Square would close. Macy's closure was part of a plan to close 68 stores nationwide, with Sarasota Square's store closing permanently on March 26, 2017. Sears closure was part of a plan to close 20 additional stores nationwide after announcing 72 closures on June 6, 2017. Sears closed permanently on September 18, 2017.

In August 2020, the mall's noteholder, U.S. Bank National Association, notified Unibail-Rodamco-Westfield of proceeding with foreclosure action. Unibail-Rodamco-Westfield was notified on May 5, 2020, of its default to the mortgage-backed security loan associated with the property. The mall was acquired by Torburn Partners in 2021.

The Florida Department of Health (FDOH) utilized the mall as a county-operated COVID-19 vaccination clinic from January to June 2021. The Department of Health in Sarasota County stated they delivered more than 150,000 doses of the Moderna vaccine at the vaccination clinic.

Torburn Partners proposed in May 2023 to redevelop the site by demolishing the majority of the mall except for the JCPenney and Costco anchor stores and planning 1,200 apartments on the site with build-out expected within five to seven years. The site will also have mixed retail in place of the existing enclosed building.

AMC Theatres closed on October 31, 2024. The mall closed in late 2024, and demolition began in February 2025. JCPenney and Costco have been retained as separate stores, and the former AMC was not demolished and remains vacant. In June 2025, Costco bought the property where its store is located for $10.5 million.
