= Crossings at Siesta Key =

- Location: Sarasota, Florida, U.S.
- Coordinates: 27.3009°N 82.5285°W
- Address: 3501 South Tamiami Trail
- Opened: 1956
- Developer: Benderson Development
- Num. of stores: 46
- Num. of anchor tenants: 3 (2 vacant, one occupied)
- Floor area: 415,478 sq ft (38,599.2 m^{2})
- Floors: 1 (2 in Macy's)

Crossings at Siesta Key (formerly known as South Gate Shopping Plaza, Southgate Plaza, Westfield Southgate, and Westfield Siesta Key) is a shopping mall in Sarasota, Florida that opened in 1956. The mall features a Cinebistro on the site of the previous anchor tenant Saks Fifth Avenue, and has two vacant anchor pads once occupied by Dillard's (later LA Fitness) and Macy's.

== History ==
=== Strip mall ===
Crossings at Siesta Key originally opened on January 15, 1957 as an outdoor strip mall named South Gate Shopping Plaza. The original strip included two supermarkets: Publix and Winn Dixie, along with a W. T. Grant and Woolworth. JCPenney was added as part of a 1961 expansion, which brought a department store to the plaza.

W.T. Grant closed in 1977. The building was bought by Burdines, which opened in November 1977. Burdines heavily renovated the building in preparation for opening. During renovations, they added an atrium to the store with a glass elevator, which allowed them to use the building's partial second floor for retail (W.T. Grant only used the first floor for sales).

Also in 1977, JCPenney closed its store and relocated to the newly-built Sarasota Square Mall. Robinson's of Florida, the Florida division of California-based J.W. Robinsons opened in the former JCPenney space in October 1978. The Robinson's store was notable since it was their first Florida store to open in an existing building and was smaller than their other Florida stores. Robinson's sold its Florida stores to Maison Blanche, a Louisiana-based department store in 1987. The store was officially rebranded as Maison Blanche on March 28, 1988.

In 1981, the mall's first enclosed wing was added.

=== Enclosed mall ===
The mall, by that point named Southgate Plaza, was fully enclosed in 1988. In August 1991, Maison Blanche sold its Southgate Plaza location and six others on the Gulf Coast of Florida to Dillard's. In 1994, Publix moved to a larger store across the street. The Publix building became Saks Fifth Avenue in 1996. Following the opening of Saks Fifth Avenue, the mall was renovated to include more upscale stores such as Williams Sonoma, Ann Taylor, and Banana Republic.

Westfield Group bought the mall in 2002, renaming it Westfield Shoppingtown Southgate. Burdines was renamed Burdines-Macy's on January 30, 2004 as the brands were merged by their parent company. On March 6, 2005, the Burdines name was officially dropped and the stores were fully merged into Macy's, who still operates at the mall today. The "Shoppingtown" suffix in the mall's name was dropped in June 2005, and the mall became Westfield Southgate.

In 2012, Saks Fifth Avenue confirmed that it would relocate to the Mall at University Town Center, a new mall being built in Sarasota by Taubman Centers. Dillard's closed their doors at Southgate in 2014, also relocating to the Mall at University Town Center. In late 2014, Cobb Theatres announced it would take over the Saks space for a "Cinebistro" concept.

On June 1, 2017 the mall was renamed Westfield Siesta Key. Lucky's Market and LA Fitness opened in sections of the former Dillard's space in 2017. Lucky's Market closed on February 12, 2020 with the rest of the chain's Florida stores, and was replaced by Aldi. Westfield sold their share of the mall to their partner, O’Connor Capital Partners, in December 2020, and the mall was renamed Crossings at Siesta Key.

Crossings at Siesta Key was sold to Benderson Development in 2022, the same company who owns Mall at University Town Center.

On January 9, 2025, it was announced that Macy's store would be closing as part of a plan to close 66 stores nationwide. The store closed on March 23, 2025, which left the mall with no anchors, cementing its status as a dead mall.
