= Theresa Rosado =

American artist

Theresa Rosado (born 1965) is a Latin American artist who focuses her art on realism and some forms of surrealism. Her paintings reflect her Latin American heritage and have been described by critics to be fragments of her dreams and memories. Per Rosado, she was drawn to an unusual sense of beauty and wonder and was intrigued by symbolism in paintings in Catholic churches and contemporary revisions. She is the owner of Casa de Rosado, an art gallery for which she received a City Pulse LGBT Inclusion Award in 2018.

== Biography ==
Theresa Rosado was born in 1965 in St. Louis, Missouri and was raised by a blue collar family of Puerto Rican and Macedonian descent.

== Education ==
Rosado went to Michigan State University studying and graduating with a degree in anthropology. She took additional an additional course in Art history of Mexico taught by Charlene Villasenor Black of UCLA at Michigan State University. She also self taught herself African-American Art History.

== Artworks ==
=== On Prom Night I Danced with My Grandmother ===
On Prom Night I Danced with My Grandmother (1993) pictures three figures who contribute to the Latin American culture hinted in the painting. A female playing the guitar with her companion and a smaller figure dressed in blue under a dome-like structure. This blue figure may represent her grandmother and may be whom the female guitarist is playing and dancing to. The painting is composed of two sections. The upper half of the painting includes a colorful background of pineapples hung across a blue sky, plants along the white wall, a blue and red polka dot dress in the left corner, and the female's companion playing the guitar while dancing along the wall. The bottom portion of the painting consists of the female guitarist in a yellow and red polka dot outfit dancing along the grass in front of the white wall. There are red flowers near the white dome over the small blue figure. The female, her companion, and the small blue figure are placed in a triangular manner within the painting which symbolize unity.

=== Flying Girl ===
In Rosado's 1994 Flying Girl she combines surrealism with realism by painting a mansion surrounded by flowers with a girl in a yellow dress flying towards the top of the mansion. According to Robert Henkes, the girl in the yellow dress presents the element of surrealism because if she were not to be in the painting, the scene would look realistic. Within the field of red flowers surrounding the house is a yellow bird, perched on top of one of the flowers near the front of the house. The identical row of windows on the sides of the house remain consistent in size and may be seen in the era of the Italian Renaissance. Because this painting has elements of surrealism, it is difficult to interpret any symbols because it is personal to the artist.

=== Prayer of a Sun Woman ===
Prayer of a Sun Woman (1994) presents elements of human life within the centered image of the sunflower woman. The sunflower woman is composed of the sunflower head, a woman's body and legs, and a branching leaves that represent the arms. Circling the branching sunflower woman are birds of multiple colors. Henkes states that behind this abnormal sunflower are normal sunflowers growing vertically from the pink ground. He further states that this sunflower woman overlapping the normal field of normal sunflowers makes the painting more unique as it allows the audience to focus on the sunflower woman. Across the chest of the woman is a flag of Puerto Rico that put emphasis on Rosado's cultural background.

=== Five Mysteries or More ===
Five Mysteries or More (1994) contains a variety of components. The painting takes place in a garden of Eden. Within this garden is a blue stream running down from the focal point of a woman's face, four naked woman with their feet in the water besides the stream, which flows down to a clothed woman in a blue dress holding the flags of Rosado's ancestral and native countries, Cuba and the United States of America. All of the woman in the painting are of different races and are connected by an ongoing circle of fruit that tie around their necks. Per Henkes, the painting as a whole is personal to Rosado as it contains many elements or her life that can only be truly and accurately interpreted by Rosado herself.

== Exhibitions ==
Solo Exhibitions

- 1995: Casa de Unidad, Detroit, Michigan
- 1995: Lansing Art Gallery, Lansing, Michigan
- 1996: General Motor Institute, Flint, Michigan

Group Exhibitions

- 1991: Ella Sharp Museum, Jackson, Michigan
- 1992: Northern Michigan University, Marquette, Michigan
- 1992: Scarab Gallery, Detroit, Michigan
- 1993: Michigan Heritage & Folklore Gallery, Grand Rapids, Michigan
- 1994: Krasl Art Center, St. Joseph, Michigan
- 1995: Flint Fine Art Gallery, Flint, Michigan
- 1995: Michigan State University, East Lansing, Michigan
- 1995: Kresge Art Center, Michigan State University, East Lansing, Michigan
- 1995: Kellogg Center, East Lansing, Michigan

== Collections ==
Rosado's work can be seen in the collections of the Labor Council for Latin American Advancement and the Interfaith Council for Workers Justice.
