= Westwood Mall =

Westwood Mall may refer to:

- Westwood Mall (Jackson, Michigan), a shopping mall in Jackson, Michigan, United States
- Westwood Square Mall, a shopping mall in Mississauga, Ontario, Canada (formerly known as Westwood Mall)
