= Lakeview Square Mall =

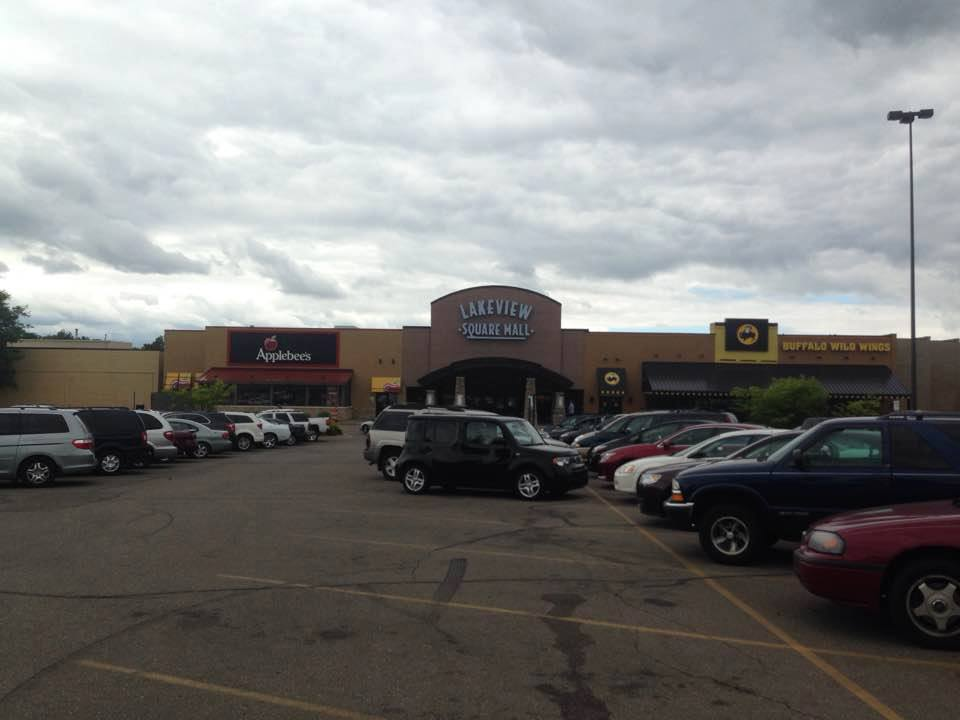
- Western entry (2016)
- Location: Battle Creek, Michigan
- Coordinates: 42.263°N 85.184°W
- Address: 5775 Beckley Road
- Opened: August 3, 1983; 43 years ago
- Renovated: 1999/2000, 2024 (Buffalo Wild Wings only)
- Previous names: Battle Creek Square Mall (Early concept phase)
- Developer: Forbes/Cohen Properties, LLC.
- Manager: GK Real Estate
- Owner: GK Real Estate
- Num. of stores: 25
- Num. of anchor tenants: 3 (2 open, 1 vacant)
- Floor area: 550,000 square feet (51,000 m^{2}) (GLA)
- Floors: 1
- Parking: Uncovered
- Public transit: Battle Creek Transit
- Website: www.lakeviewsquare.com

Lakeview Square Mall is an enclosed shopping mall serving the city of Battle Creek, Michigan. It opened in 1983 and features Horrocks Farm Market and ExtraSpace Storage as anchors. Previous anchor stores at the mall included Sears, J. C. Penney, Macy's (previously Hudson's and Marshall Field's), and Gilmore Brothers. Other major tenants include Barnes & Noble, Shoe Dept. Encore, and Dunham's Sports. The mall is managed by GK Development.

== History ==
Sidney Forbes and Maurice Cohen, owners of Forbes/Cohen Properties, first announced plans for Lakeview Square in 1980. The proposal called for a mall to be located on property on Beckley Road on the south side of Battle Creek, bound to the north by I-94 and to the east by M-66. In order to construct the mall, Forbes/Cohen had to acquire a permit from the Michigan Department of Natural Resources to relocate Brickyard Creek, a creek running along the western side of the property.

Lakeview Square opened on August 3, 1983. When it opened, the mall featured three anchor stores: JCPenney, Sears and Hudson's (which became Marshall Field's in 2001 and Macy's in 2006), along with a Big Boy, which is now where Applebee's is, Cole's, which relocated from the Downtown Michigan Mall, opening a women's clothing store, along with a men's clothing store in 1986. Zales also relocated from the Michigan Mall, along with Florsheim. In 1993, Kalamazoo-based Gilmore Brothers opened at the mall. One of the first expansions at the mall was a movie theater complex, which was added to the Sears wing and opened in 1995.

General Growth Properties bought the mall, along with Westwood Mall and Lansing Mall, from Forbes/Cohen in 1998. The same year, Old Navy opened at the mall, replacing a space vacated by Kalamazoo-based department store Gilmore Brothers five years prior. In 1999, the mall was remodeled. Dunham's Sports also opened a store at the mall in 2006, relocating from the nearby Minges Creek Plaza. Steve & Barry's opened a store at the mall in 2007, replacing Old Navy. The Steve & Barry's went out of business during the company's bankruptcy in 2008. That space is now occupied by Shoe Department Encore.

The mall was sold to Cushman & Wakefield in 2011, and again to GK Development in 2013.

Around the 2010 to 11 mark, when the mall was remodeled again, the food court was removed and a Buffalo Wild Wings opened in its place.

On January 4, 2017, it was announced that Macy's would be closing as part of a plan to close 68 stores nationwide. The store closed in March 2017. On March 17, 2017, it was announced that JCPenney would also be closing on July 31, 2017 as part of a plan to close 138 stores nationwide which left Sears as the only anchor left. After those two closures, more stores left the mall, including FYE in July 2018. On November 8, 2018, it was announced that Sears would be closing as well in February 2019 as part of a plan to close 40 stores nationwide which will leave the mall with no anchors left. Around late 2022 to early 2023, more stores left including: Bath & Body Works(opened in 1998), left the mall and moved to a bigger building at the Harper Village Center a block away, Claire's, which moved into the nearby Walmart Supercenter, and Auntie Anne's. Leaving only a couple stores in the middle corridor of the mall including: General Nutrition Center(GNC), and Chinese Wellness. In late 2023, Maurices left the mall and moved into the vacated Gordon Food Service building. The Mall now only has 12 name brand stores.
