= The Village of Rochester Hills =

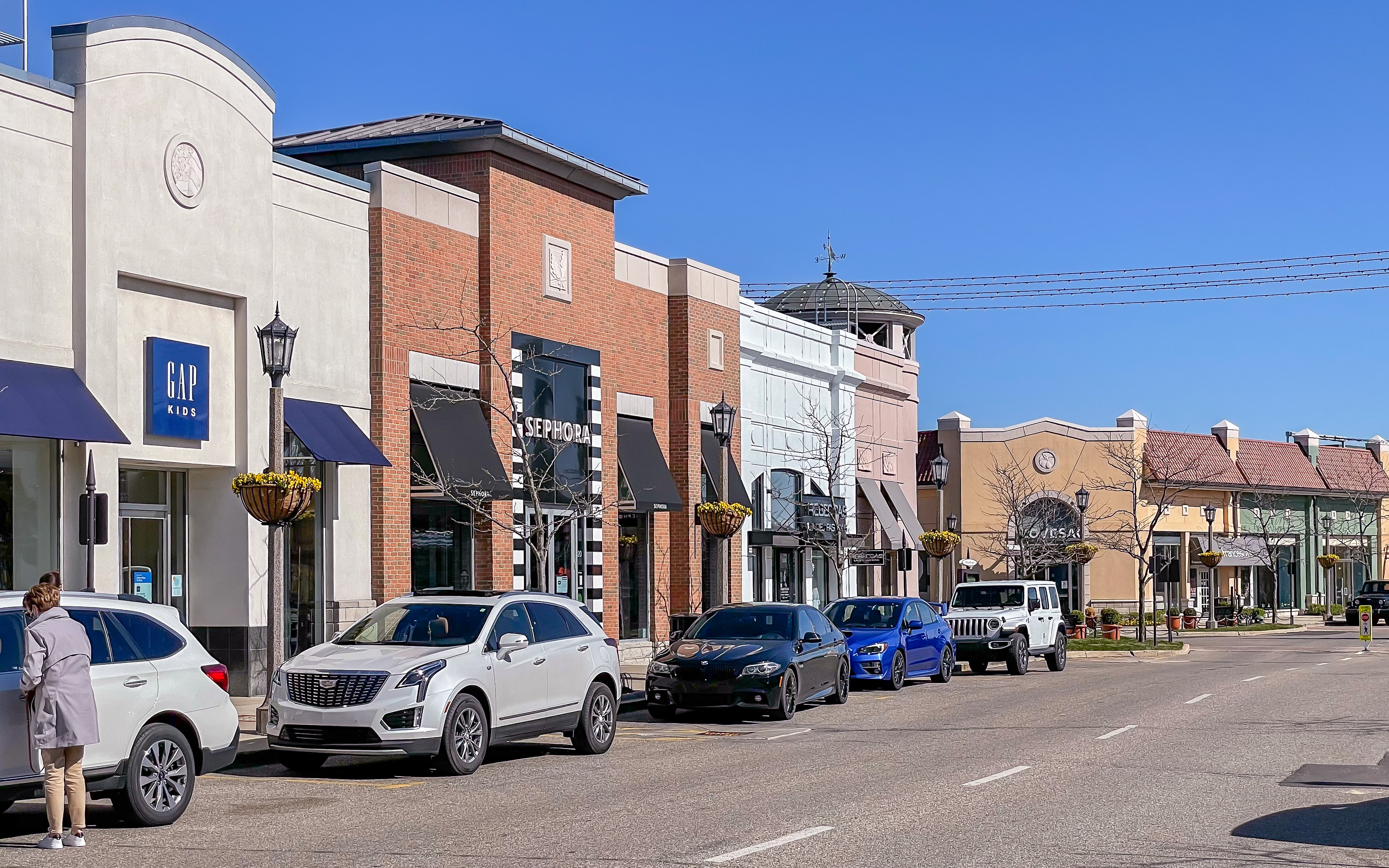
- 2021
- Location: Rochester Hills, Michigan, United States
- Coordinates: 42°41′02.9″N 83°11′34.2″W
- Address: 104 N. Adams Rd. Rochester Hills, MI 48309
- Opened: September 20, 2002
- Developer: Robert B. Aikens & Associates
- Owner: Robert B. Aikens & Associates
- Num. of stores: 40+
- Num. of anchor tenants: 2
- Floor area: 375,000 square feet (34,800 m^{2})
- Floors: 1 (2 in Von Maur)
- Public transit: SMART 492
- Website: website

The Village of Rochester Hills is a lifestyle center located in Rochester Hills, Michigan, a northern suburb of Detroit. Built in 2002, the center replaced a former enclosed shopping mall called Meadowbrook Village Mall. The Village of Rochester Hills features the traditional retailers Von Maur and Whole Foods Market, in addition to prominent specialty retailers such as Williams Sonoma, Talbot's, Banana Republic, Chico's, J.Jill, and Pottery Barn.

== History ==
The northeastern corner of Walton Boulevard and Adams Road in Rochester Hills, Michigan was originally occupied by Meadowbrook Village Mall. This was a small enclosed shopping mall built in 1976, which did not feature any major anchor stores, and Frank's Nursery & Crafts as the largest tenant.

Starting in the mid-1980s, Meadowbrook Village Mall's owners, Robert B. Aikens & Associates, had made unsuccessful attempts to attract national chain stores to the mall. In 1996, the company made the decision to demolish the property for a lifestyle center complex anchored by a Parisian department store and a Farmer Jack Food Emporium supermarket, with the other stores arranged along a "main street." The Village of Rochester Hills opened on September 20, 2002 as the Detroit area's first lifestyle center, with more than fifty inline tenants, including the largest Talbots clothing store in the state, and the state's first Coldwater Creek. Upon opening the Village of Rochester Hills store, Detroit became the second most-profitable market for the Parisian chain. Farmer Jack closed the last of its stores in 2007 when its parent company, The Great Atlantic & Pacific Tea Company (A&P), decided to exit the Detroit market, and Whole Foods Market moved from an existing store into the former Farmer Jack building.

Parisian became Carson's in January 2013.

On April 18, 2018, it was announced that Carson's would shutter after it wasn't able to establish any new conditions to satisfy its established long-term debt. In 2019, it was announced Von Maur would begin overhauling the structure. The new Von Maur store, the chain's fourth Michigan location, initially had planned on opening in the fall of 2020, however it opened a year and a half later on March 19, 2022, due to COVID-19.

In April 2019, Barnes & Noble opened a new store at the Village.
