= Lansing Mall =

Coordinates: 42.74203°N 84.62704°W

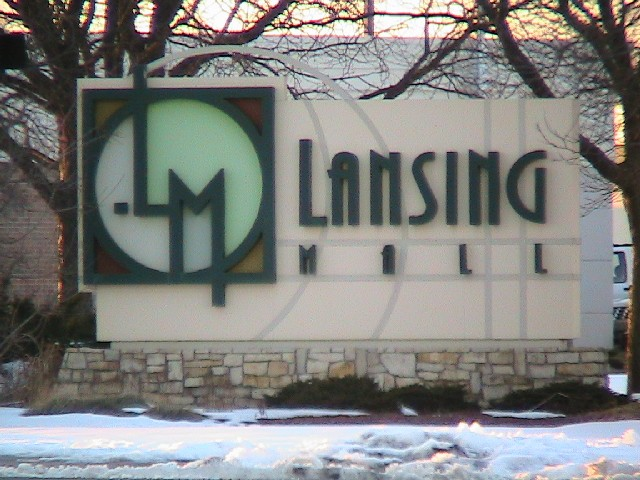
- Lansing Mall entrance sign on Saginaw Highway
- Location: Delta Charter Township, Michigan, United States
- Address: 5330 West Saginaw Highway
- Opened: July 31, 1969; 57 years ago
- Developer: Forbes-Cohen
- Manager: Kohan Retail Investment Group; Summit Properties USA
- Owner: Kohan Retail; Summit Properties USA
- Num. of stores: approx. 60
- Num. of anchor tenants: 3
- Floor area: 830,052 square feet (77,114.4 m^{2})
- Floors: 1 (2 in JCPenney)
- Public transit: CATA
- Website: lansingmall.com

Lansing Mall is an enclosed shopping mall located in Delta Charter Township, Michigan, United States, just outside Lansing, the state capital of Michigan. Opened in July 1969, the same year as its crosstown competitor Meridian Mall, Lansing Mall consists of 830,052 square feet (77,114.4 m^{2}) of gross leasable area, with approximately 60 stores and restaurants, as well as a food court. Its original anchor stores were Wurzburg's, Federal's, and Montgomery Ward. Only three years after opening, Wurzburg's and Federal's were replaced by J.W. Knapp Company (Knapp's) and Robert Hall Village respectively. In 1979, the Robert Hall space was then vacated as part of an expansion project that also added a new mall wing ending in Hudson's, while J. C. Penney replaced Knapp's a year later and Mervyn's joined in 1987. The mall's anchor stores remained unchanged between then and the first decade of the 21st century: Hudson's was renamed to Marshall Field's, which itself later became Macy's, while the bankrupted Montgomery Ward and Mervyn's were replaced with Younkers and a Regal Entertainment Group movie theater. Following the closures of Macy's and Younkers, the mall's only operational department store is J. C. Penney. Other major tenants include Dunham's Sports, Barnes & Noble, a food court, BEST furniture store, Zap Zone XL, and a 12-screen movie theater. The mall is managed and owned by Kohan Retail Investment Group and Summit Properties USA.

== History ==
Lansing Mall was built by Detroit, Michigan-based mall developers Forbes-Cohen, just outside the state capital of Lansing, Michigan within Delta Township along M-43 (Saginaw Highway). It officially opened to the public on July 31, 1969. Originally, it included three anchor stores: Montgomery Ward at the eastern end, Federal's at the western end, and Wurzburg's, a department store based in Grand Rapids, Michigan, in the middle. Other major tenants at opening included Cunningham Drug, Schensul's Cafeteria, and McCrory. Wurzburg's sold its store to the Lansing-based J.W. Knapp Company (Knapp's) in March 1972, in order to focus on its Grand Rapids-area stores. In December 1972, Federal's announced the closure of six stores due to a bankruptcy filing, including both the Lansing Mall store and a second Lansing-area location at the Frandor Shopping Center. Robert Hall Clothes announced in late 1974 that it would open a Robert Hall Village discount store in the former Federal's space. This store also lasted only three years, and its inventory was liquidated in 1977 after Robert Hall filed for bankruptcy.

In 1979, the mall underwent a two-phase expansion. The first phase divided the former Federal's/Robert Hall Village anchor store into a new mall concourse, which featured soft seating areas, planters with ficus trees, and skylights. Stores present in this expansion included The Limited, Casual Corner, Lane Bryant, The Gap, and Herman's World of Sporting Goods, along with a cluster of restaurants that included Elias Bros. Big Boy, York Steak House, Hot Sam Pretzels, Great Hot Dog Experience, Morrow's Nuts, Mrs. Fields, and Olga's Kitchen. The second phase, featuring identical decor, consisted of a new wing extending westerly beyond the first phase of expansion, adding several new stores along with a Hudson's department store. After the expansion was complete, the mall featured over 105 tenants. One year after this expansion, Knapp's also filed for bankruptcy and sold its location at Lansing Mall, along with ones at Meridian Mall in nearby Okemos and Westwood Mall in Jackson, to J. C. Penney. After York Steak House closed, its space was used to create a food court known as the Picnic, which opened for business in August 1984. Included in the food court were nine restaurants, seating for 299 patrons, and new planters. As they were adjacent to the Picnic, many of the restaurants added in the 1979 expansion were considered part of it as well.

=== 1980s to Mid-1990s ===
Another expansion to the mall was announced in 1986 and completed a year later, consisting of a new wing anchored by a Mervyn's department store. The opening of this store was part of that chain's entry into the Michigan market, which comprised several other stores across the state including a second Lansing area store at Meridian Mall. Construction of this wing required the demolition of an original outparcel, the Lansing Mall Theater, which was the last single-screen cinema in the Lansing area. Lansing Mall's expansion, extending northerly from the Picnic, consisted of fifteen new storefronts including Lerner New York (now known as New York & Company) and LeRoy's Jewelers, along with relocations of Waldenbooks and three other existing tenants. In addition, Taco Bell joined the food court.

=== Decline ===
Many store closings ensued at the mall in the early 1990s, including five chain clothing stores and a T.J. Cinnamons bakery all in late 1991 and early 1992. Despite these closures, the mall also gained Champs Sports and a dollar store, and its occupancy level of 92 percent was higher than the average occupancy rate of 85 percent for malls in the Midwestern United States at the time. Limited Brands (now L Brands) opened three stores then under its ownership in 1993: a combination Limited Express/Structure store (now known as Express and Express Men, respectively) and Victoria's Secret. The combined Limited Express/Structure took the place of Herman's World of Sporting Goods, which had closed earlier in the year. According to the mall's then-general manager, Limited Brands had wanted to open all three brands at the mall for several years, and that all three were highly demanded by shoppers due to their presence at Meridian Mall. Following these additions, Lansing and Meridian malls had nearly 60 stores in common with each other and nearly 40 others that were unique to each. In 1995, the mall received new planters and an enlarged customer service booth. Meanwhile, RadioShack and Regis Hairstylists moved to new storefronts, Lane Bryant expanded its existing store, and Buckle, Bombay Company, and Pacific Sunwear joined. These were followed in 1996 by Gymboree, Bath & Body Works, and the second Disney Store in the state of Michigan.

=== Late 1990s to Mid 2010s ===
In 1996, Forbes-Cohen sold the mall to General Growth Properties, who immediately began a $24 million renovation. As part of this renovation, the mall concourses were given new tiles, skylights, and seating areas, while the exterior was given new lighting and signage. Also, the food court's seating area was doubled in size and the mall restrooms were renovated. Following the closure of Montgomery Ward in May 1999, many renovations focused on the eastern wing of the mall. Old Navy opened in July 2000, displacing seven smaller storefronts in that wing. One of these stores, Men's Wearhouse, moved to a new storefront with exterior access. Barnes & Noble opened two months later, displacing seven more storefronts in that wing and resulting in the closure of B. Dalton, which was owned by the same company at the time. Two new restaurants also joined at this point: Panera Bread and Genghis Grill, whose location was both their first in Michigan and their first to be located in a mall. The former Montgomery Ward building was tenanted by Younkers in 2002, although the store's construction was delayed. Saks, Inc., then-owners of the Younkers chain, had bought the Montgomery Ward building in 1997 and had intended to convert it at this point, but lacked the finances to construct the store at the time. As a result, General Growth purchased the building back and, once Montgomery Ward closed, leased the space to Younkers. The former Montgomery Ward automotive repair center, located just east of the store, was demolished and replaced with a Best Buy, which opened in 2002 as well. Two years after this expansion was completed, Dunham's Sports took further space in the Younkers wing.

Lansing Mall entrance from south side

More anchor store changes ensued in 2006: Mervyn's closed in January of that year, and became Steve & Barry's that November. TJ Maxx moved into the mall in March 2006, replacing an older store across the street. The opening of TJ Maxx replaced several storefronts, including three stores that closed entirely (The Gap, Buckle, and Bombay Company), along with two others (FYE and Foot Locker) which were relocated elsewhere in the mall. Both Steve & Barry's and Old Navy closed at the mall in 2009.

Lansing Mall main entrance from south side

General Growth spun off management of 30 mall properties, including Lansing Mall, into a new division called Rouse Properties in 2011. (Note: Brookfield Properties Retail Group acquired the Rouse portfolio in 2016, and then acquired General Growth in 2018.) In January 2013, Regal Entertainment Group announced that it would build a 50,000-square-foot (4,645 m^{2}) 12-screen cinema on the site of the vacated Mervyn's/Steve & Barry's anchor. The new theater opened in July 2014. Toby Keith's I Love This Bar & Grill began to build a bar in several storefronts adjacent to the theater in 2013, but construction was halted due to several contractors filing liens against the owners of the chain for not "reimbursing them in a timely and complete manner". As a result, the chain was evicted from the still-unfinished property, and Rouse Corporation won a $6.2 million lawsuit against its owners. A local bar known as Tequila Cowboy ultimately took over the space, and opened there in December 2015.

=== Late 2010s to present ===
Macy's announced in January 2017 that its store at Lansing Mall would close that year, along with three others in Michigan. Another anchor vacated in 2018 when The Bon-Ton, which took ownership of the Younkers chain in 2006, filed for bankruptcy and underwent liquidation at all stores. The closure of these anchor stores has coincided with the closure of several other inline tenants throughout. A mid-2018 article in the Lansing State Journal noted that the mall had over 15 vacancies, and several other storefronts that had been repurposed as store displays. Closures at this point included Vitamin World, rue21, and Finish Line, the latter of which was repurposed as a storefront church. In addition, Tequila Cowboy closed in March 2019. Later that year, it was replaced by a new completely renovated live music venue called Overdrive. However, Overdrive closed in 2020 due to the COVID-19 pandemic. Also in 2019, a further sign of the mall's decline emerged when tenants Panera Bread and Chipotle announced plans to vacate the mall and reopen nearby. Panera has since relocated to a freestanding building adjacent to the parking lot, while Chipotle opened a new location in the shopping plaza across the street. In November 2019, Houlihan's, a restaurant which had been at the mall for nearly 40 years, abruptly closed, announcing on their Facebook page that high rent was a determining factor. Moving trucks were present at the restaurant the next day, gathering items. In October 2020, Brookfield Properties put the mall up for sale.

In March 2021, Brookfield Properties sold the mall to Kohan Retail Investment Group. At the time of sale, the mall was approximately 56 percent leased. TJ Maxx moved out of the mall in September 2021. Later after this, BEST Furniture store took the spot of Macy's, and Zap Zone moved from by the nearby Elmwood Park Apartments, and into the spot of Younkers, now called Zap Zone XL. Best Buy has also left its location in the Mall's parking lot, joining TJ Maxx at the nearby Delta's Crossing.
