= Schuler Books & Music =

Bookstore

Schuler Books

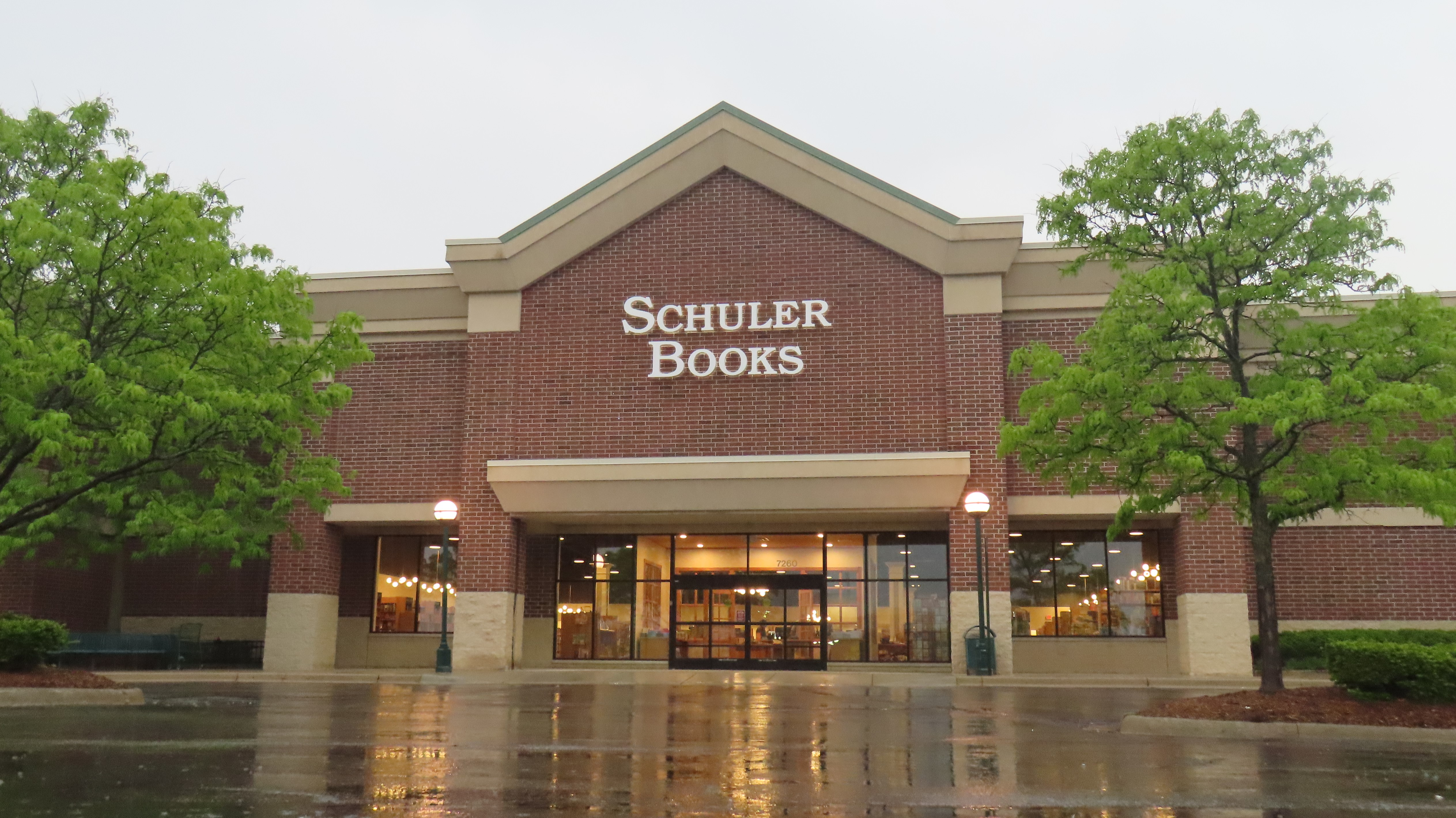
- Schuler Books in West Bloomfield, Michigan
- Company type: Family business
- Industry: Bookselling
- Founded: 1982
- Headquarters: Grand Rapids, Michigan
- Number of locations: 4 (2023)
- Key people: Bill Fehsenfeld; Cecile Fehsenfeld
- Products: Books, Music, Gifts, Magazines, Used Books
- Website: www.schulerbooks.com

Schuler Books is an independent bookseller with four locations across the U.S. state of Michigan. Along with new and used books, Schuler stores feature an extensive gift section, magazines, print on demand services, event spaces, and a café.

== History ==
Schuler was founded in 1982 by Bill and Cecile Fehsenfeld. The two had met working at an Ann Arbor bookstore; Bill later worked for Borders, before the pair opened their first store on 28th Street in Grand Rapids. The original store predominantly sold new books and newspapers, but did not have a café, though the store served espresso drinks via a kiosk cart. A much larger store opened in 1995 a few blocks west of the original location, with The Chapbook Café and expanded offerings with music among other items.

Schuler expanded to the Lansing area in 1990 with a store in Okemos. In 2001, it moved to the Meridian Mall. A second Lansing location opened at Eastwood Towne Center in 2002, and closed on February 3, 2018, allegedly following a rent dispute. 6,000 used books from the Eastwood store's inventory were donated to the Friends of the East Lansing Public Library following its closure.

A second Grand Rapids-area location opened in Walker in 2003, and closed in 2014.

In 2007, Schuler opened a location in downtown Grand Rapids, in part of the former Steketee's department store. This store closed in 2013.

Schuler acquired an Espresso Book Machine in 2009, and began offering print on demand books.

In 2014, Schuler acquired Ann Arbor bookstore Nicola's Books. The store retained its original name until July 2022, when it was rebranded as Schuler. Schuler acquired a neighboring storefront for an expansion of the store, with plans to complete the expansion by December 2022.

In August 2022, Schuler announced an expansion into the Detroit market, with plans for a store in West Bloomfield. The store opened in May 2023.

== Locations ==
Current

- 2660 28th St. SE, Grand Rapids, Michigan – opened 1995
- Meridian Mall, 1982 W Grand River Ave., Okemos, Michigan – opened 2001
- 2509 Jackson Ave., Ann Arbor, Michigan – formerly Nicola's Books, acquired 2014, rebranded as Schuler in 2022
- 7260 Orchard Lake Rd., West Bloomfield, Michigan – opened May 2023

Former

- 2975 28th St. SE, Grand Rapids, Michigan – opened 1982, closed 1995
- 4800 Okemos Rd., Okemos, Michigan – opened 1990, closed 2001
- Eastwood Towne Center, 2820 Centre Blvd., Lansing, Michigan – opened 2002, closed 2018
- 3165 Alpine Ave. NW, Walker, Michigan – opened 2003, closed 2014
- 40 Fountain St. NW, Grand Rapids, Michigan – opened 2007, closed 2013
