= Laurel Park Place =

Coordinates: 42°24′43.6″N 83°24′54″W

- Location: Livonia, Michigan, U.S.
- Opened: 1989
- Developer: Schostak Bros. & Co.
- Manager: CBL & Associates Properties (mall portion)/ Schostak (office portion)
- Owner: CBL & Associates Properties (mall portion)/ Schostak (office portion)
- Num. of stores: approx. 30
- Num. of anchor tenants: 5 (2 open, 3 vacant)
- Floor area: 506,685 sq ft (47,100 m^{2})
- Floors: 1 (2 in Von Maur, 4 in office building, 6 in Marriott hotel)
- Parking: 4-floor garage
- Website: www.laurelparkplace.com

Laurel Park Place is an enclosed shopping mall located in the city of Livonia, a suburb of Detroit, Michigan, United States. The mall, which is managed by CBL & Associates Properties, features approximately 30 stores and three restaurants. Laurel Park Place includes a Phoenix movie theater, restaurants, a food court, the attached Livonia Marriott hotel, and an office building. In 2004, Laurel Park Place had $409 per sq ft of sales, above the threshold for class A mall properties. It is located near the intersection of I-275 and 6 Mile Rd. The mall's anchor stores are Von Maur and Dunham's Sports.

== History ==
Laurel Park Place was developed by Schostak Bros & Co. of Southfield, Michigan. The mall opened in 1989, featuring a Marriott hotel, an office tower, with Jackson, Michigan-based Jacobson's as its anchor store. This store was the largest Jacobson's in the chain.

Parisian opened its first Michigan location at the mall in August 1994. The store was part of a 150,000-square-foot (14,000 m^{2}) expansion that included additional mall space at the northern end. Jacobson's declared bankruptcy and closed the last of its stores in 2002, with its store at Laurel Park Place replaced a year later by Von Maur. CBL & Associates Properties acquired a 70% joint venture interest in the mall from Schostak Bros. & Co. in 2005. Schostak has since moved its headquarters into Laurel Park Place's office complex.

In 2007, Laurel Park Place was one of three Detroit-area shopping malls to install big-screen televisions throughout the mall, advertising businesses within the mall itself. A food court was added next to the Marriott hotel in 2008, but is mostly vacant as of 2020.

Parisian was re-branded to Carson's in January 2013.

On April 18, 2018, it was announced that Carson's would be closing as parent company The Bon-Ton Stores was going out of business. The store closed on August 29, 2018.

On November 15, 2019, Dunham's Sports opened a 45,000-square-foot (4,200 m²) store in the lower level of the former Carson's.

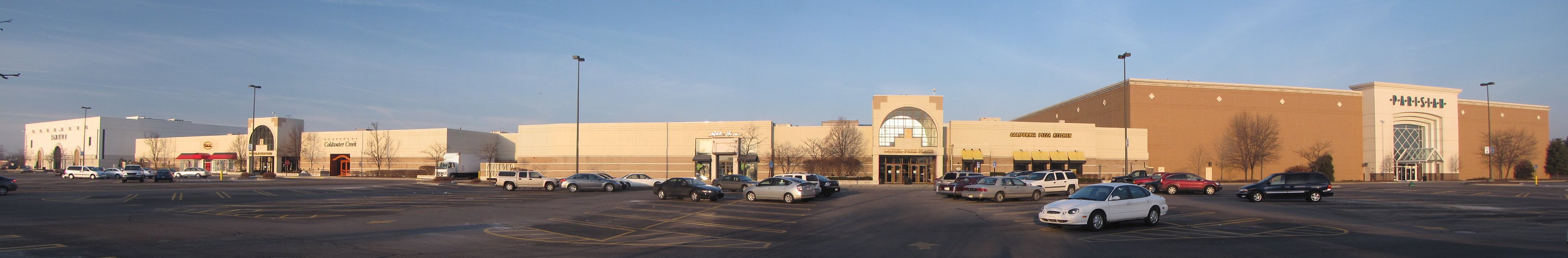
Laurel Park Place, east entrance, circa 2012
