= Personal stylist =

Person who selects or recommends clothing and accessories for a client

A personal stylist advises individuals on new fashion trends, clothing styles, personal styles, colors, and make-up. A personal stylist is not to be confused with a wardrobe stylist, who selects the clothing for published editorial features, print or television advertising campaigns, music videos, concert performances, and public appearances made by celebrities and models. Personal stylists typically work one-on-one with a client, while wardrobe stylists are often part of a larger creative team collaborating with a fashion designer, photographer, art director, hair stylist, and makeup artist to put together a particular look or theme for a specific project.

== Personal styling ==
A personal stylist is concerned with an individual rather than a particular fashion brand.

Interest in personal stylists has increased in recent years, influenced by a rise to fame for celebrity stylists like Rachel Zoe, Trinny and Susannah, and Gok Wan, and the overabundance of reality television shows featuring makeovers and the day-to-day lives of personal stylists (e.g., The Rachel Zoe Project). This has increased awareness of there being a theory behind achieving styles that suit people individually. Personal stylists are now addressing this demand and work with the general public, who view the service as a luxury but a beneficial experience.

There are numerous personal stylists worldwide, and the numbers are growing steadily. Many personal stylists are affiliated with an accredited industry body, such as the Federation of Image Professionals International (FIPI), which sets the industry standards in line with City and Guilds and is based in the UK. Training is offered by a number of image schools and can take up to a month to complete.

== Role and services ==
Personal stylists advise clients on clothing, colours, make-up, hair, and overall appearance for personal or professional situations. Services may include reviewing or organising a client's wardrobe, selecting outfits for events such as weddings or business meetings, and advising on personal presentation. Some styling work overlaps with fashion, retail, media, photography, and image consulting, and stylists may work with other professionals such as hair stylists, make-up artists, photographers, or creative teams.

== Distinction from related occupations ==
A personal stylist overlaps with, but is distinct from, several related appearance and fashion occupations. Closely related titles include image consultant, fashion consultant, and personal wardrobe consultant; occupational classifications describe these roles as advising clients on clothing, accessories, hair colour, hairstyles, make-up, posture, general appearance, and manners.

By contrast, a photographic or fashion stylist generally works on visual productions, such as photo or video shoots, and may choose clothes, props, backgrounds, and other visual elements according to a creative brief. Make-up artists are a separate occupation focused on applying make-up and styling hair for people appearing on camera, on stage, or in front of a live audience.

== Training and professional organizations ==
Training requirements for personal stylists and related image-consulting occupations vary by country and provider. In Canada, the Government of Canada's Job Bank states that specialized training courses are available for colour consultants, make-up and skin care consultants, and other image, social, and personal consultants, while experience in fashion, art, modelling, or related fields is usually required. The same source states that the occupation is not regulated in Canada.

Professional associations and training providers offer voluntary qualifications or continuing professional development. The Federation of Image Professionals International offers a Master Award in Image Consultancy, with modules including colour analysis, style and body analysis, cosmetic application, personal shopping, and wardrobe management, and also describes a voluntary continuing professional development programme for members.

== Personal styling services ==
Personal styling services, also known as online styling services or clothing subscription boxes, are services that provide boxes of clothing via mail. These services are usually subscription-based. Personal styling services come in the form of both startup companies and add-ons for existing brands and department stores.

== See also ==
- Stitch Fix
- Subscription box
- Trendsend
- Trunk Club
