= Lansing Art Gallery =

Nonprofit art gallery in Lansing, Michigan

Coordinates: 42.73437°N 84.55248°W

The Lansing Art Gallery ("LAG") was a nonprofit art gallery located in downtown Lansing, Michigan, USA. LAG offered a meeting space for other arts organizations, exhibition facilities, memberships for individuals and businesses, art competitions, education outreach, "Art Smart" after-school classes, Art Scholarship Alert, high school competition, summer art camps, workshops, artist demonstrations, and lectures. In addition to sales, LAG offered art rental/lending, and actively marketed those services to local businesses.

== History ==
The gallery was formed in 1965 by a group of local artists, teachers and business people, with the support of Lansing governmental leaders, and was originally known as the Lansing Community Gallery. It was the first permanent art gallery in Lansing. As of 1978, LAG was partially funded through the Comprehensive Employment and Training Act (CETA), with CETA funding the entire director's salary.

During its lifespan LAG has been located in six different locations, with its final relocation being to the former J.W. Knapp Company Building in early 2022. The Knapp's building is not the first historically significant location of LAG, which was located above Jim's Tiffany Restaurant from 1967 to 1975, the Lansing Center for the Arts Building along with Boarshead Theater from 1975 to 2004, and the former Lieberman's, the only commercial building designed by architect and designer George Nelson from 2004 to 2009. The move to the Knapp's Center was funded in part by a grant from the Michigan Economic Development Corporation Match on Main program, through the Downtown Lansing Inc. downtown management agency. In February 2022, Lansing's mayor, Andy Schor, announced plans to build a mid-sized performing arts center in downtown, tentatively named "The Ovation", with LAG as one of the prospective tenants.

The Lansing Art Gallery closed down at the end of April 2025, citing insurmountable financial challenges. The nonprofit organization which ran the gallery continued to operate, organizing and stewarding its remaining funds while trying to decide whether it should refocus on art education and advocacy without the benefit of a physical gallery or dissolve.

== Awards ==
In 1995, LAG received a Distinguished Service Award by the Michigan Art Education Association for its "commitment and dedication to the culture and arts of the city of Lansing", noting its then-current programs, including Art Smart after-school classes, Art Scholarship for high school students, Visual Arts exhibits, Brown Bag lectures, and annual Lansing Community College Student Art Show.

== Outdoor public art projects ==
In 2010, LAG began offering outdoor, free public art displays, and in 2011 secured funding from the Lansing Economic Development Corporation and the Arts Council of Greater Lansing for an outdoor public display of 75-100 works throughout the streets of Lansing. The 2011 public art exhibit, "City Streets" and the 2012 exhibit "Art by the River" was subjected to vandalism, including destruction of a sculpture "Meditation Tower" by artist Mark Chatterley, valued at $28,000. After these incidents, security monitoring for the exhibits was increased by Lansing police. Surveys showed that 44% of the visitors to Art by the River traveled to Lansing specifically to see the display, significantly contributing to the local economy. In 2018, LAG organized ArtPath, a display of works by Michigan-based artists along a three-mile stretch of Lansing's River Trail, sponsored by MEDC, Auto-Owners Insurance and Patronicity among others, which attracted over 82,000 visitors in 2020.

== See also ==
- List of museums in Michigan
