= J.W. Knapp Company =

American department store in Michigan

J. W. Knapp & Co.
- Logo for Knapp's department store used during the 1970s.

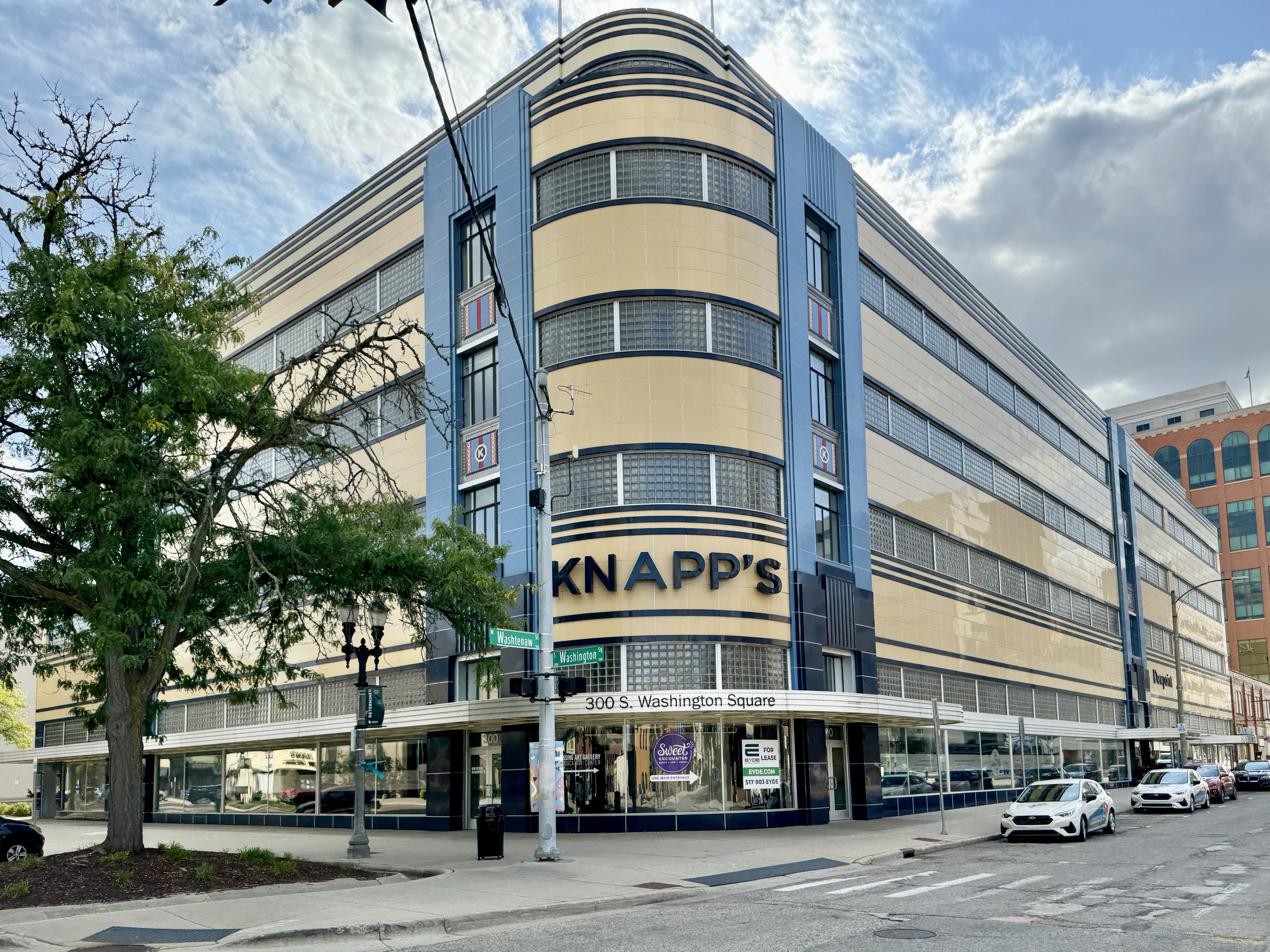
- Exterior of the former Knapp Building flagship store in Lansing, Michigan (2024)
- Trade name: Knapp's
- Company type: Subsidiary
- Industry: Retail
- Genre: Department Store
- Predecessor: Jewett & Knapp
- Founded: 1893; 133 years ago
- Founders: Joseph W. Knapp; Frank W. Jewett
- Defunct: October 17, 1980; 45 years ago
- Fate: Acquired and Converted into JCPenney
- Successor: JCPenney
- Headquarters: Lansing, Michigan, United States
- Number of locations: 4 (3 Lansing area, 1 Jackson)
- Areas served: Central Michigan
- Parent: Charles Stewart Mott Foundation (1950-1970); L.S Good (1970-1980)
- Website: None

The J. W. Knapp & Co., more commonly known as "Knapp's", was a chain of department stores in mid-Michigan based in Lansing, Michigan.

== History ==
In 1893, Joseph W. Knapp, a salesman originally from Hillsdale, Michigan opened a dry-goods, coat, and carpet store in Albion, Michigan in partnership with Frank W. Jewett, called Jewett & Knapp. By 1897, the store had relocated to 123 N. Washington Avenue in Lansing, occupying 6,000 sq ft (560 m^{2}) of space at the site of a former dry-goods store.

In 1908, Jewett and Knapp sold the business to Frank Lackey, who renamed the store "J.W. Knapp Company". Knapp remained in charge of company operations, with Lackey as a silent partner. Knapp's billed itself in advertising of the day as "Lansing's Busy Reliable Store".

The same year, the business moved to 220–226 South Washington St. By 1918, Knapp's had incorporated a specialty gift store into its business, the "Kenilworth Gift Shop" in partnership with Kenilworth Studios of Chicago, and involved an extensive advertising campaign. In 1923, Knapp supplied the latest current fashions to costume participants in a musical revue at Michigan Agricultural College in nearby East Lansing. In 1928 the store was expanded and renovated for $15,000 to help it compete with the rival F.W. Arbaugh Company. The new South Washington store featured a pneumatic cash transportation tube system.

In 1937, Knapp's commenced construction of a new building, completed in 1939, at 300 S. Washington, on the site of the Hotel Downey, which was demolished to make room for the new store, and the still earlier Lansing House hotel and saloon. The store expanded by the 1940s to cover a full city block.

In the 1950s, the company was sold to the Charles Stewart Mott Foundation, which owned a collection of department stores in mid-Michigan, including Smith-Bridgman in Flint; D.M. Christian Company in Owosso, and Robinson's in Battle Creek. Knapp's opened a smaller branch in East Lansing in the early 1960s; this store was later closed, and a newer Knapp's was built as one of the anchor stores of Meridian Mall in Okemos when it opened in 1969. Two additional mall-based locations, at Lansing Mall in Lansing, and Westwood Mall in Jackson, were acquired in 1972 from Grand Rapids-based Wurzburg's.

Extensive television advertising on WJIM Channel 6 made Knapp's known throughout mid-Michigan.

In 1970 the L.S. Good Co. of Wheeling, West Virginia bought all of the Mott Foundation divisions; L.S. Good Co. declared bankruptcy in 1980, and all of the former Mott Foundation nameplates were shuttered. The three mall-based locations were all sold to JCPenney, while the downtown Lansing location had been permanently closed by the parent company weeks prior. The structure was converted to office space and later to mixed use.

== See also ==
- J.W. Knapp Company Building
