= The Shoppes at Eastchase =

- Dillard's, anchor for The Shoppes at EastChase
- Location: Montgomery, Alabama
- Coordinates: 32.36°N 86.16°W
- Opened: November 2002
- Developer: Jim Wilson & Associates
- Owner: Bayer Properties
- Num. of stores: 63
- Num. of anchor tenants: 1
- Floor area: 725,000 square feet (67,355 m^{2})
- Floors: 1 (2 in Dillard's)
- Website: theshoppesateastchase.com

The Shoppes at EastChase is the principal retail component of the EastChase mixed-use development located in Montgomery, Alabama at the intersection of Interstate 85 and Taylor Road on the east side of the city. The Shoppes at EastChase was the catalyst in attracting higher-end national and regional retailers to the Montgomery metropolitan area and the Central Alabama region.

The lifestyle center itself opened November 2002, with numerous in-line tenants, including Talbot's, Ann Taylor, The Gap and Banana Republic, while the anchor retailer, Dillard's, opened a two-level 157,339-square-foot (14,617.3 m^{2}) store March 2004. This store replaced one at Montgomery Mall.

Book and media retailer Books-A-Million functions as junior anchor at 14,400 square feet (1,340 m^{2}), while defunct home furnishings retailer Linens 'n Things previously occupied a 27,984-square-foot (2,599.8 m^{2}) junior anchor pad in a different section of the lifestyle center now occupied by DSW Shoes. An outparcel was developed for home furnishings retailer Rooms To Go, which opened a 7,000-square-foot (650 m^{2}) store south of the main entrance drive. There are several casual dining facilities in the Shoppes at EastChase, including Bonefish Grill and Zoës Kitchen. The Shoppes at EastChase has a gross leasable area of 350,000 square feet (33,000 m^{2}) and currently features fifty merchants.

In August 2016, it was announced that fast fashion retailer H&M will develop a 22,000 square foot junior anchor space in the lifestyle center component of EastChase. By June 2017, original tenants Banana Republic, Ann Taylor and Williams-Sonoma closed their EastChase locations to create retail space for the retailer.

Expected to open during fall, Eastchase is extending a new area to include a relocated Best Buy, Burlington, Panda Express, Bad Daddy's Burger Bar, Jersey Mike's Subs and Great Clips.

Two additional open-air power and convenience centers complement the retail component of the EastChase development: The 325,907-square-foot (30,277.8 m^{2}) Plaza At EastChase and the larger 513,688-square-foot (47,723.2 m^{2}) EastChase Market Center. The Plaza At EastChase is tenanted with (then) new to the market big box stores such as Target, World Market, Kohl's and PetSmart. EastChase Market Center features numerous big box retailers and eateries that have relocated from declining strip mall locations along nearby East Boulevard, among them Bed Bath & Beyond (now closed) and Michaels arts and crafts supply store. Wholesale warehouse club Costco operates a location adjacent to EastChase Market Center.

Originally developed by Jim Wilson and Associates, The Shoppes At EastChase is currently owned by JPMorgan Chase and managed by Crawford Square Real Estate Advisors.
