= Dawn Foods =

American wholesale food products company

Dawn Food Products, Inc.
- Type: Private
- Industry: Food products
- Founded: 1920; 106 years ago
- Headquarters: Jackson, Michigan, United States
- Area served: International
- Key people: Carrie Jones-Barber, CEO; John Schmitz, president (North America); Steven Verweij, president (Europe, AMEAP); Emilio Castillo, president (Latin America)
- Products: Bread, ingredients
- Revenue: ~$1.25bn (2006)
- Number of employees: 5,000 (2019)
- Website: www.dawnfoods.com

Dawn Foods (originally called the Dawn Donut Company) is an American wholesale manufacturer and distributor of breads, baked goods, mixes, and other food products. The company is based in Jackson, Michigan and operates globally.

== History ==
Prior to 1920, the bakery in Jackson, Michigan was known as Century Bakery; it was purchased by Grover Lutz and Eugene Worden in 1920, who expanded and renamed it the Dawn Donut Company. It produced a donut mix which proved successful and brought the company customers from across the Midwest. The mix was sold in 100 lb bags and 200 lb barrels, delivered by rail or horse. Dawn was the first industrial bakery mix company in the United States.

Dawn was greatly affected by the Great Depression and later by rationing during World War II, and as a result its operations in the 1930s and 1940s were much smaller than during the 1920s.

In 1935, Marlin Jones began working at Dawn as a bookkeeper; over the next two decades, he and his wife Evelyne saved money, and in 1955 Jones borrowed the rest needed to purchase Dawn for approximately $600,000. Under the Jones' ownership, the company expanded during the 1950s and 1960s. In 1957, Dawn was worth over $1M and the company purchased Baker Perkins's automated donut machine division. The same year, Marlin's son Ron began working for Dawn as an accountant, and siblings Miles and Steven joined in 1967 and 1968 respectively. The company patented an automatic donut turnover icing machine in 1966, and formed subsidiary Dawn Equipment Company the same year.

Dawn Donut Company was officially renamed Dawn Food Products in 1978. By 1982, when Marlin Jones died, the company's annual revenue was $40m. Dawn purchased Bessire & Company's icing production facilities in 1982, and purchased Denver-based distributor Western Bakers Supply in 1985.

Through a partnership with the Torigoe Company, Dawn expanded to Japan in 1979; it later established a manufacturing plant in Evesham, United Kingdom in 1989. The company founded its Dawn Foods International division in 1997.

In 2002, Dawn acquired Canadian mix manufacturer CSP Foods from Saskatchewan Wheat Pool for CAD$35M. In 2003, the company purchased Bunge Limited's North American operations for $76M. Dawn Foods moved its headquarters to a larger location in Jackson – the former Jacobson's headquarters – in 2004. Dawn saw an annual revenue of $2B in 2006.

Ron, Miles, and Steven Jones were inducted into AIB International's Baking Hall of Fame in 2007.

== Current operations ==
The company operates sixteen distribution centers in North America. As of 2020, the CEO is Carrie Jones-Barber; she has worked at Dawn since 1985. Notable clients include Krispy Kreme, Starbucks, and WW International.

Dawn Foods publishes a quarterly magazine, Batter Up.

== Locations ==
=== Offices ===
- Evesham, United Kingdom – sales office
- Amstelveen, Netherlands - Europe HQ, sales office
- Oosterhout, Netherlands - sales office
- Paris, France - sales office
- Barcelona, Spain - sales office
- Palmela, Portugal - sales office
- Poznan, Poland - sales office
- Darmstadt, Germany - sales office
- Budapest, Hungary - Sales office CEE
- Boston – digital innovation team
- Dubai, UAE – sales office
- Jackson, Michigan – headquarters

=== Manufacturing ===
As of 2020, Dawn Foods operates manufacturing facilities in 57 locations.

- Crown Point, Indiana – frozen products
- Evesham, UK – manufacturing
- Louisville, KY – filling and icing
- Modesto, California – bakery mix
- Seattle, Washington – bakery mix
- Steenbergen, Netherlands – frozen dough products
- Groningen, Netherlands - manufacturing
- Palmela, Portugal
- Darmstadt, Germany
- Manage, Belgium
- Erquinghem, France
- Bielsko Biala, Poland
- Monterrey, Mexico

== Acquisitions ==
- Jabex Sp Zoo Poland (2020)
- Bunge North America (2003)
- CSP Foods (2002)
- Knaubs Cakes (1997)
- Millie's Cookies (1989)
- Mixco International SA de CV (1997)
- Unifine Food & Bake (2011)
- Western Bakers Supply (1985)

== See also ==
- E. E. Smith – Food engineer and science-fiction author (1890–1965) who was the production manager from 1936 to 1940
