= Jacobson's =

Former American department store chain

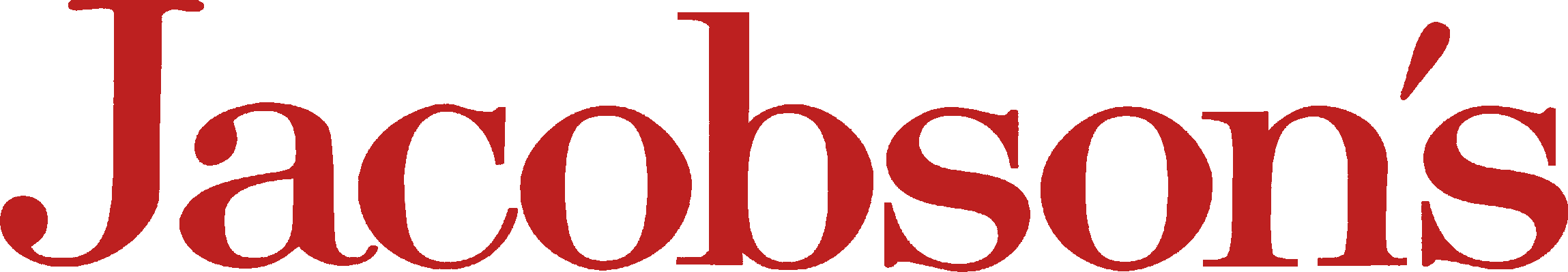
- Industry: Retail (department store)
- Founded: 1838; 188 years ago, Jackson, Michigan
- Founder: Abram Jacobson
- Defunct: 2002; 24 years ago (original company); 2011; 15 years ago (revival)
- Fate: Chapter 11 bankruptcy followed by liquidation (original company); Shuttered by owner (revival)
- Headquarters: Jackson, Michigan (original); Winter Park, Florida (revival)
- Number of locations: 0
- Area served: Florida, the Midwest
- Key people: Tammy Giaimo
- Products: Apparel, jewelry, furniture

Jacobson's was an American regional upscale department store chain. Based in Jackson, Michigan, the chain operated primarily in Michigan and Florida, but also had stores in Ohio, Indiana, Kentucky and Kansas. Jacobson's focused on apparel, fine jewelry and home furnishings. The chain entered bankruptcy in early 2002 after 164 years of service. One store in Winter Park, Florida was re-established as Jacobson's in 2004, but closed in 2011.

== History ==
The first Jacobson's store was opened by Abram Jacobson in Reed City, Michigan, in 1838. It eventually expanded to Ann Arbor, Battle Creek and Jackson, Michigan, as well, moving its headquarters to Jackson in 1937. Two years later, brothers Zola and Nathan Rosenfeld purchased the company and began expanding it throughout the state. Zola held the title of company president at the time of his death in 1961, while Nathan remained chairman until his 1982 death.

In 1945, Nathan Rosenfeld hired J. Russell Fowler, a former manager for the Jordan Marsh chain, to manage Jacobson's. Under Fowler's management, Jacobson's saw a significant increase in sales and expanded into Florida. Despite declining sales in the 1980s, the chain attempted two prototypes: a more upscale store at Laurel Park Place in Livonia and a discount store in Troy.

=== 1990s ===
Logo for Jacobson's department stores used from the 1970s to the early 2000s

Jacobson's faced further retail decline in the early 1990s. In 1991, the store began operating on Sundays. Previously, Jacobson's stores were closed on Sundays, as it was believed that doing so would help to attract a better caliber employee. Also that year, the chain opened a store in Naples, Florida, and moved its flagship from downtown Ann Arbor to a former Lord & Taylor location at Briarwood Mall. A location in Birmingham, Michigan, was renovated to target upscale shoppers in their mid-twenties.

The chain made further changes to its retail line in the 1990s, expanding its plus-size clothing lines and adding other lines catered to younger shoppers. A decision was made to control the growth of stores, by only opening one or two a year. The chain's first Kentucky location, in Louisville, opened in 1994. In 1995, however, Jacobson's posted its biggest loss since 1977, and as a result, three Metro Detroit locations were closed and thirty-two workers were laid off. In addition, competitors Nordstrom and Parisian had begun opening locations in Detroit, increasing the chain's competition. Jacobson's also opened locations in Leawood, Kansas, and Boca Raton, Florida.

By 1997, Jacobson's had twenty-four stores in operation. The chain began to promote its customer service and quality through marketing, and although the Midwestern locations continued to lose money, the Florida stores remained profitable. An East Lansing, Michigan, location that opened in 1970 was relocated to a new store on the site of a former Service Merchandise at Meridian Mall in nearby Okemos in 2000.

=== 2000s ===
In 2002, however, Jacobson's filed for Chapter 11 bankruptcy protection and closed five stores, including one at The Fashion Mall at Keystone in Indianapolis, Indiana, as well as the Meridian Mall location. After failing to find a buyer, Jacobson's began liquidation on its last remaining stores, and was closed by the end of 2002. The Briarwood Mall store and another at Laurel Park Place in Livonia, Michigan, were both sold to Davenport, Iowa-based Von Maur. In early 2004, Longwood, Florida-based Jake's Stores bought the naming rights and re-established Jacobson's in Florida. The company's headquarters in Jackson found a new tenant in baked goods manufacturer Dawn Foods in 2004.

The second incarnation of Jacobson's never saw the planned expansion ever take place. After nearly eight years of doing business as a one-store operation near the former Winter Park, Florida Jacobson's location, the "new" Jacobson's closed on December 21, 2011. Its owner, Tammy Giaimo, shuttered the one location with plans to open a store using a different name near another company she owned.
