= Olga's Kitchen =

American chain of Greek-American family restaurants

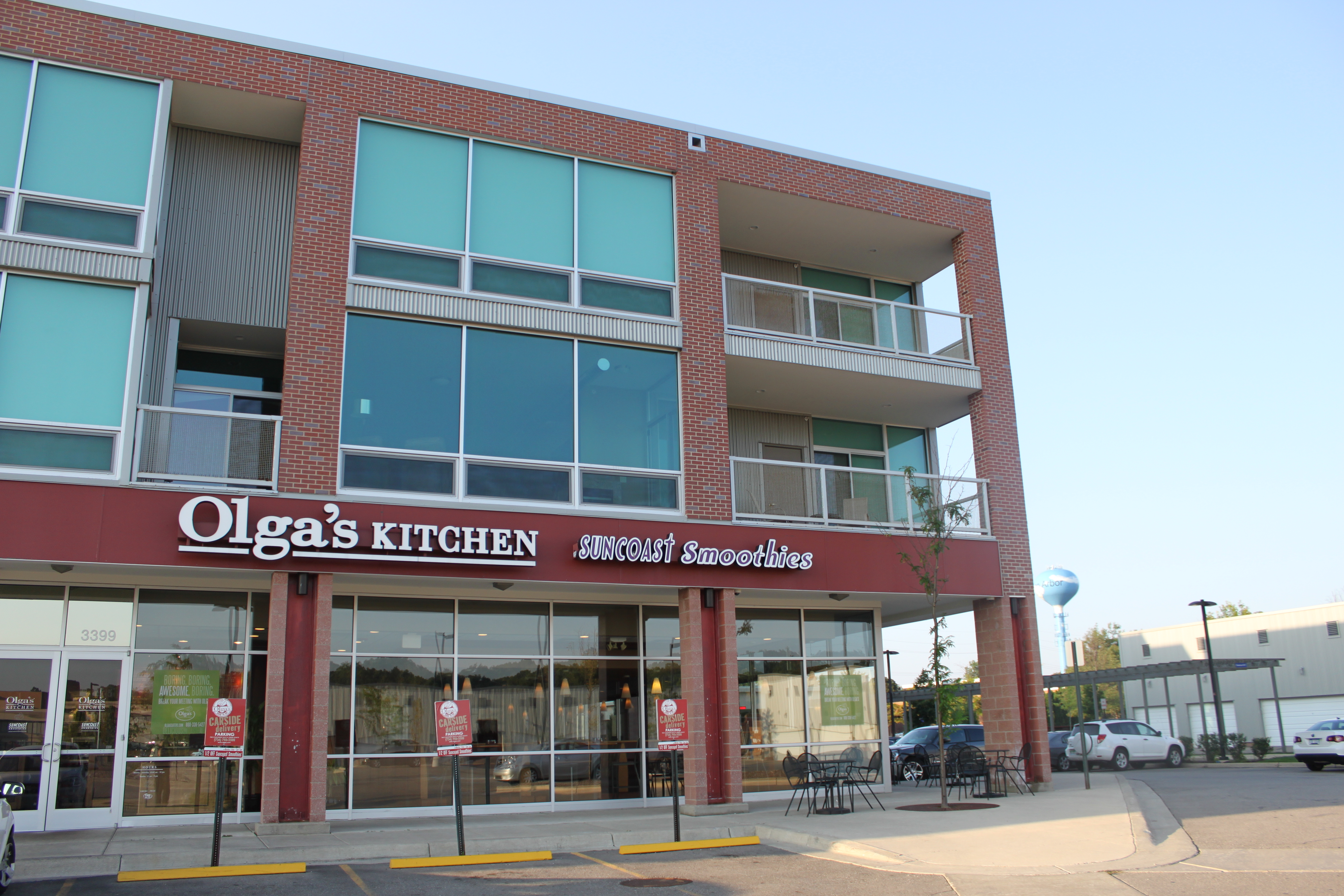
- Olga's Kitchen in Ann Arbor, Michigan
- Industry: Restaurant
- Founded: 1970 in Birmingham, Michigan, US
- Founder: Olga Loizon
- Headquarters: Livonia, Michigan
- Number of locations: 36 (2025)
- Area served: Midwest
- Products: Greek-American cuisine
- Website: olgas.com

Olga's Kitchen is an American chain of Greek-American family restaurants located primarily in the U.S. state of Michigan, founded by Olga Loizon in 1970. The company is based in Livonia, Michigan, and currently has 36 locations: one in Illinois, two in Ohio, and the rest in Michigan.

== History ==
Olga Loizon founded the first Olga's Kitchen in Birmingham, Michigan in 1970. Loizon developed the chain's recipes in her own basement, using a machine for making souvlaki meat which her uncle had purchased, and sauce inspired by her mother's recipes for yogurt. Throughout the 1970s and 1980s, the chain expanded through southeastern Michigan and into Illinois. The first one in Florida opened at Clearwater Mall in Clearwater, Florida in 1981. By 1985, the chain had garnered over $22 million in revenue and had begun franchising. By 1992, the chain had 56 stores in 11 states, and had opened a prototype store at Lakeside Mall in Sterling Heights. This number had shrunk by 1999 to 28 stores in four states, although one of the earliest in St. Clair Square in Fairview Heights, Illinois remained open at the time.

In June 2015, Olga's Kitchen filed for Chapter 11 bankruptcy protection. In the process it closed its one location in the city of Detroit. Loizon died at age 92 in January 2019.

== Food ==
For most of the chain's early history, one of its signature items was "Olga Bread", a handmade type of bread used on all of the chain's sandwiches, which themselves are called "Olgas". A 2006 review of the Lansing Mall location in the Lansing State Journal described the chain's signature sandwich, the Original Olga, as "a hearty sandwich that is tasty and quite filling." The sandwich, served on the Olga bread, features broiled beef and lamb, onions, tomatoes, and a yogurt-based sauce called Olga Sauce.

== See also ==
- List of Greek restaurants
