= Evereve =

American women's clothing retailer

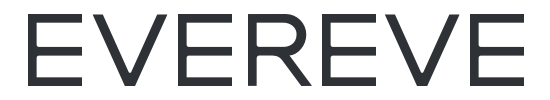
- Type: Private
- Industry: Retail
- Predecessor: Hot Mama
- Founded: 2004
- Founders: Megan Tamte, Mike Tamte
- Headquarters: Edina, Minnesota, U.S.
- Number of locations: 112
- Area served: United States
- Key people: Megan Tamte (co-CEO), Mike Tamte (co-CEO)
- Products: Women's fashion, women's clothing
- Services: Personal styling
- Number of employees: 2,500
- Subsidiaries: Trendsend
- Website: evereve.com; trendsend.com

Evereve, Inc. is an American women's clothing retailer headquartered in Edina, Minnesota. It currently operates 113 stores across the United States. The company also sells via e-commerce on its website and via a subscription-based personal styling service named Trendsend.

== History ==
Evereve was founded in 2004 by Megan and Mike Tamte, originally operating under the name Hot Mama. The first store was located at 50th and France in Edina, Minnesota.

The name Hot Mama resulted in the brand regularly being mistaken for a maternity store, prompting a rebrand in 2014 to Evereve.

Evereve reached 100 retail locations across more than 30 states by 2023. It became an equity owner in the men's clothing retailer Jaxen Grey.

== Operations ==
The company carries products from approximately 150 third-party brands and its own private label. The private label, established in 2021, accounts for 20% of sales.

The company is managed by co-founders and co-CEOs Megan Tamte and Mike Tamte. Megan Tamte was a recipient of the Ernst & Young Entrepreneur of the Year award for the Upper Midwest in 2013.

In 2021, it launched EVEREVE TV, a platform for video-based styling.

=== Trendsend ===
In 2014, the company launched Trendsend, a subscription-based personal styling service providing curated apparel shipments. 90% of Trendsend's boxes are curated in-store by stylists, while the other 10% are styled at their warehouse. The boxes are personalized based on body type and lifestyle, with two to three outfits shipped directly right to customers. Trendsend offers the same products as the Evereve website.
