= Robert Hall Clothes, Inc. =

Connecticut-based American garment retailer

Robert Hall Clothes
- Industry: Retail
- Founded: 1937
- Founder: Jacob Schwab
- Defunct: 1977
- Fate: Bankrupt
- Products: Clothing
- Parent: United Merchants and Manufacturers Inc.

Robert Hall Clothes, Inc., popularly known as Robert Hall, was an American retailer that flourished circa 1938–1977. Based in Connecticut, its warehouse-like stores were mostly concentrated in the New York, Chicago and Los Angeles metropolitan areas. According to a Time magazine story in 1949, the corporate name was an invention. The founder and head was garment merchant Jacob Schwab, who "plucked the name out of the air." It started as a single store in Waterbury, Connecticut in 1937. Schwab had been treasurer of United Merchants and Manufacturers, the parent company of Robert Hall, since 1922. By 1946 Schwab was among the highest-paid executives in America, earning more than $440,000 a year.

== History ==
In 1937, the company opened as a single store in Waterbury, Connecticut. It gradually expanded to over 350 warehouse-like outlets, based in 36 states. In the mid-1950s, the Robert Hall shop launched on 2725 6th Ave. in Huntington, West Virginia. The company already had retail facilities in Portsmouth, Ohio, and Morgantown, West Virginia.

Robert Hall produced its clothing in the U.S., mostly in the lower Hudson Valley near Poughkeepsie, New York, and in North Carolina. Ultimately the offshoring of clothing production in the 1970s doomed the company when it failed to follow suit and was undercut by retailers like K-Mart and other similar department stores. These competitors offered only “ready to wear” garments (made in various sizes), whereas Robert Hall offered tailoring and customer services to assure customers that the affordable garments they purchased actually fit them and could last a lifetime.

In July 1977, after losing more than $100 million in three years, the company entered bankruptcy proceedings. In summer 1977, all 367 Robert Hall stores were sold for $35 million. In 1982, Jacob Schwab died at the age of 90 in Manhattan.

== Sales ==
Robert Hall pioneered low-overhead, large-facility ("big box") merchandising, and combined inexpensively made goods with extensive radio and television advertising. Many Americans who grew up in the 1950s and '60s recall the commercial jingles. ("When the values go up up up/And the prices go down down down/Robert Hall this season/Will show you the reason/High quality - economy." Another jingle had the last line replaced with "Low overhead... low overhead.")

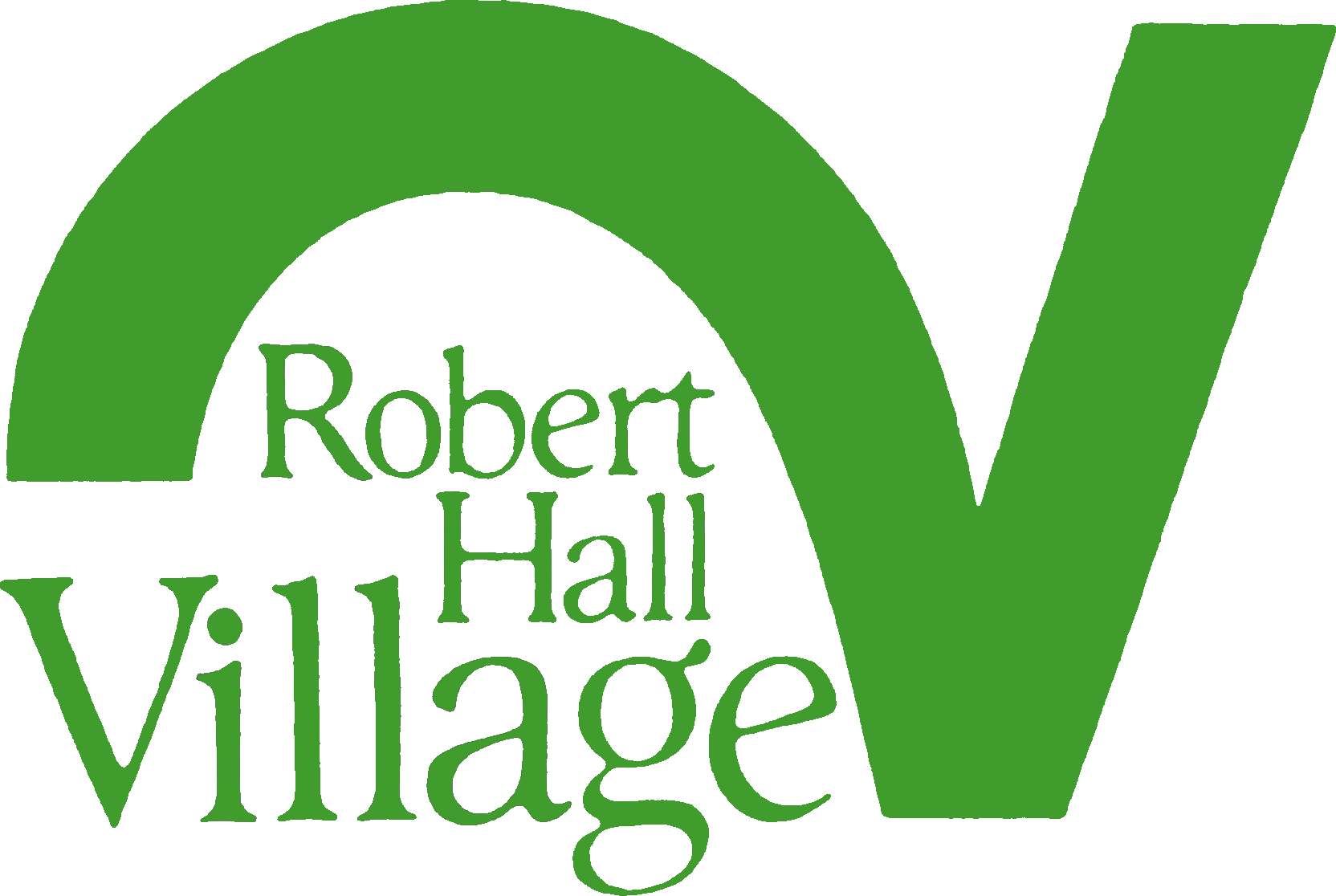
Robert Hall Village logo

The company also operated outlets of Robert Hall Village, where Robert Hall clothing was sold alongside other merchandise in stores of approximately 120,000 ft² in what's considered one of the forerunners of the discount superstore concept. Non-clothing retail areas were leased to other companies.

== Bankruptcy ==
In July 1977, Robert Hall's parent company, United Merchants and Manufacturers, filed for bankruptcy citing losses in the Robert Hall chain. All 366 Robert Hall stores were closed and inventory was auctioned off. The Robert Hall business was purchased from the UMM bankruptcy by Steven Watstein, who managed to do it with its own assets then liquidated it.

A story in the January 17, 2022 New Yorker, "What's the Deal, Hummingbird?" by Arthur Krystal includes the jingle for Robert Hall.
