= Eastdale Mall =

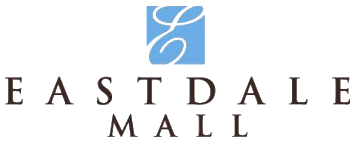
- Location: Montgomery, Alabama, United States
- Coordinates: 32.3854604°N 86.2085332°W
- Opened: August 3, 1977
- Developer: Aronov Realty
- Manager: Namdar Realty Group
- Owner: Namdar Realty Group
- Num. of stores: 100+
- Num. of anchor tenants: 6
- Floor area: 964,717 square feet (89,625.1 m^{2})
- Floors: 1 (2 in Dillard's, closed 2nd floor in At Home.)
- Website: shopeastdale.com

Eastdale Mall is a regional enclosed shopping mall located in Montgomery, Alabama. It opened on August 3, 1977. As of 2010, it was 964,717 square feet (89,625.1 m^{2}) in size. The anchor stores are At Home, JCPenney, Dillard's, and Belk.

== History ==
Montgomery Ward was an original anchor to the mall. It closed in 1983 and became Sears.

JCPenney was added to the mall in 2005, relocating from a store at Montgomery Mall. Both of the Belk locations were previously occupied by Parisian until 2007; the larger of the two was built as Pizitz, then operated as McRae's from 1987 to 1998. Dillard's was previously a Gayfers until 1998. Sears closed in 2016. At Home opened in the former Sears in 2017.

The mall's movie theater closed in March 2013, but reopened sometime in 2021 and continues to show movies to this day. Later that same year, a Chuck E. Cheese's opened across from Belk in the mall.
