= J.W. Knapp Company Building =

- U.S. National Register of Historic Places
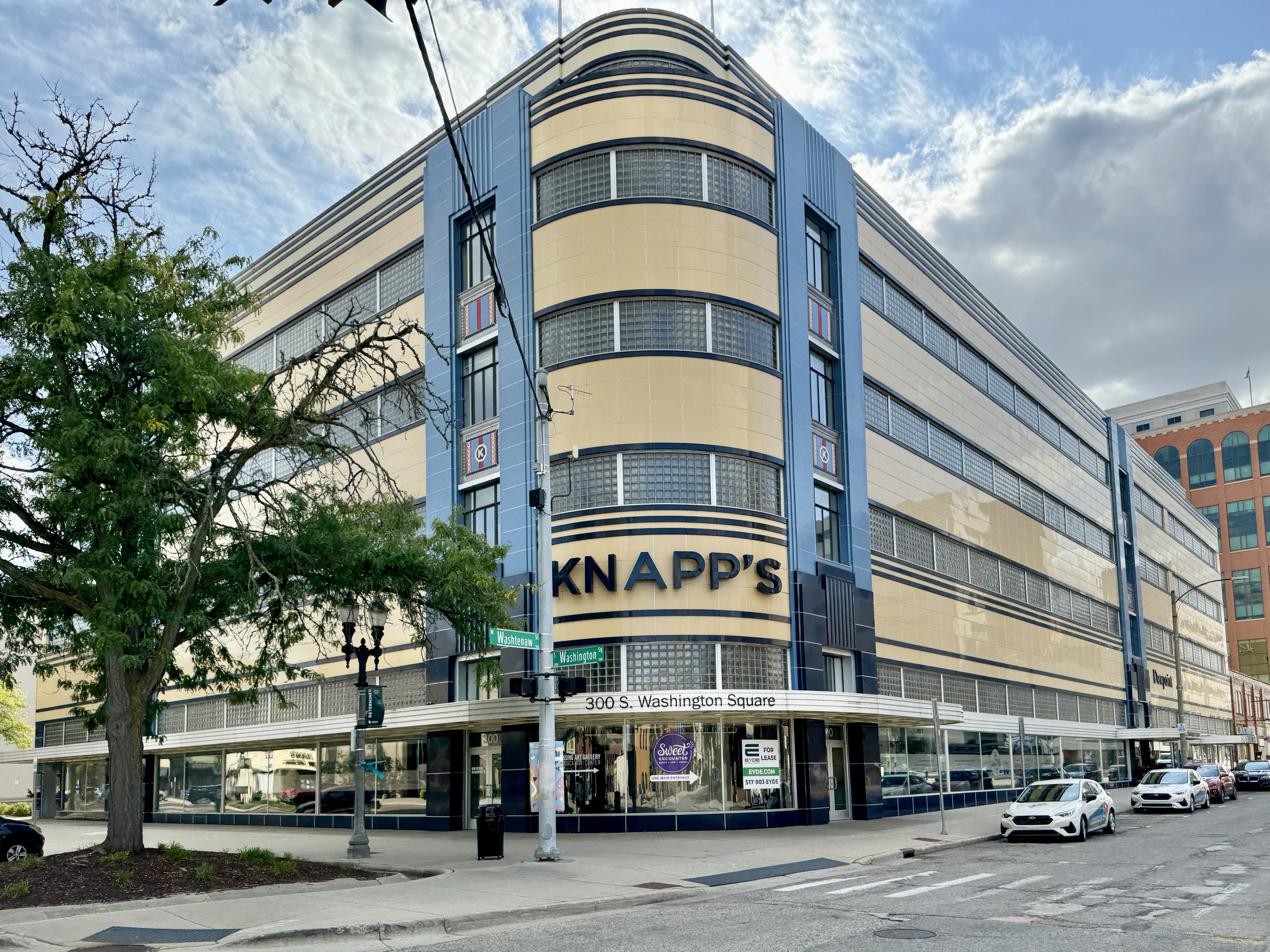
- Interactive map of J.W. Knapp Company Building
- Location: 300 S. Washington Ave., Lansing, Michigan
- Coordinates: 42°43′52″N 84°33′10″W
- Area: less than one acre
- Built: 1937
- Architect: Bowd–Munson Company
- Architectural style: Streamline Moderne
- MPS: Downtown Lansing MRA
- NRHP reference No.: 83000851
- Added to NRHP: May 21, 1983

The J.W. Knapp Company Building is a historic five-story, 190,000-square-foot (18,000 m^{2}) Streamline Moderne building in Lansing, Michigan, United States. The building opened in 1939 as the Downtown Lansing location of the J.W. Knapp Company, a local department store chain which was in business until 1980.

The building was listed on the National Register of Historic Places in 1983, and its interior was remodeled into offices for the State of Michigan, which occupied it until 2003. A subsequent renovation beginning in 2012 converted it to a mixed-use development featuring office space, ground-floor retail space, and apartments.

== Architecture ==
Designed by Orlie Munson of the Bowd–Munson Company, which also designed several other Art Deco landmarks in Lansing, including the Ottawa Street Power Station, it was constructed by the Christman Company in 1937 through 1938. The curvilinear look of the streamlined structure comes from huge plates of concrete faced with enamel, called "Maul Macotta", a copyrighted product of the Maul Macotta Company and prismatic glass brick windows. Alternating horizontal bands of yellow macotta and glass block are interrupted by vertical blue macotta pylons, rising from the building's four principal entrances. The pylons are pierced by windows. The entrance portals, display window aprons, and decorative banding are dark blue macotta. Red, yellow and blue spandrels, incorporating the letter "K" as a design element, decorate the entrance portals.

== History ==
The building housed the main department store of the Lansing-based J.W. Knapp Company. When completed in 1939, it was hailed in the contemporary press as "the most modern building in the Midwest". Today, it is considered to be one of the finest intact examples of Streamline Art Moderne commercial buildings in the Midwest, notable for its size, clarity of design and brilliant colors. The western end of the building was enlarged in 1949.

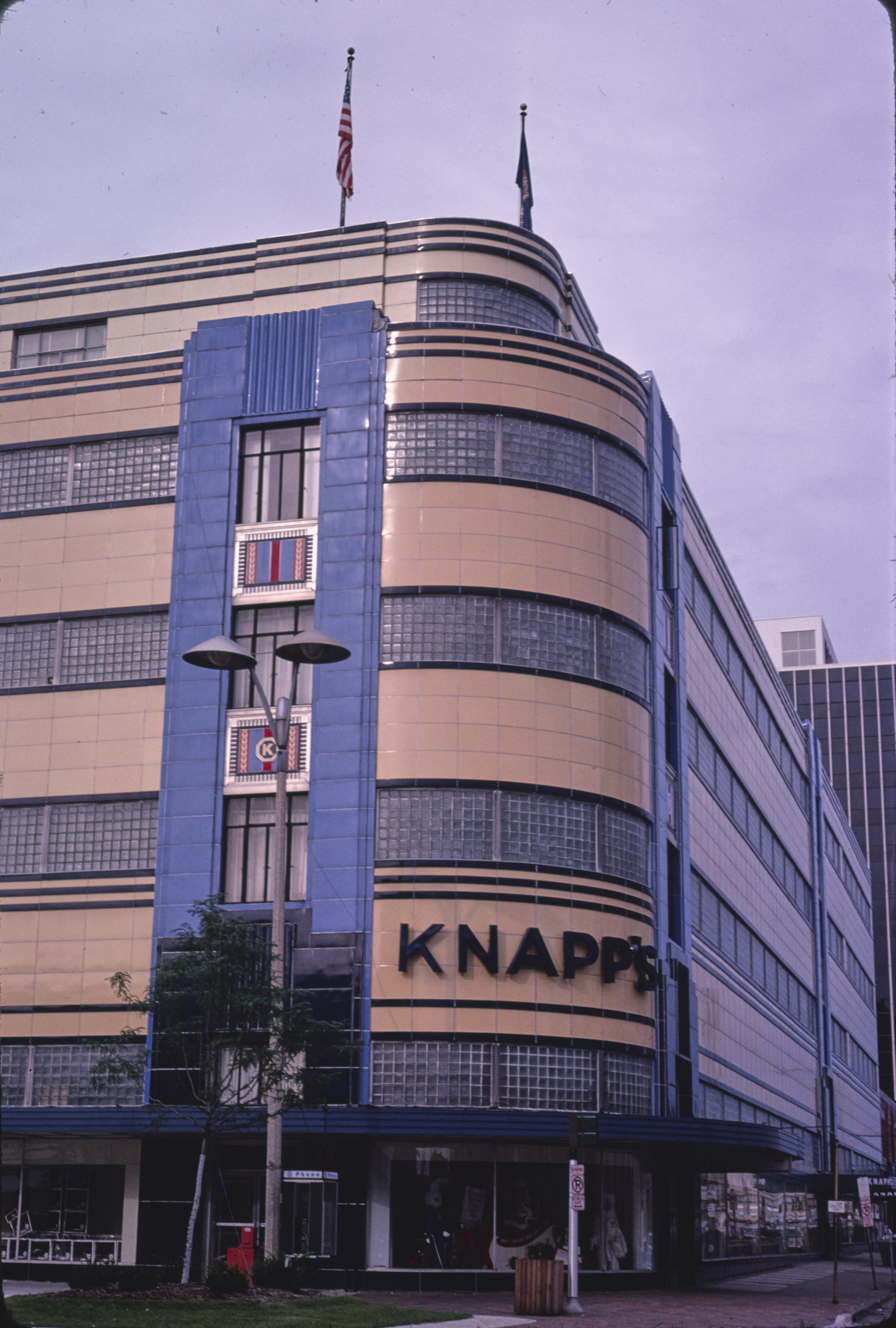
Photographed by John Margolies, 1980

The building was listed on the National Register of Historic Places on May 21, 1983.

The Eyde Company, a local developer, purchased the building in 1983, and converted most of its selling floors to state government offices, renaming it the "Knapp's Center". The state offices moved out in 2003. During the holiday season, the storefront windows are used by the MSU Museum to display historic Santa Claus advertising cutouts in connection with the city's Silver Bells Parade.

Various proposals for redevelopment of the building were considered, including a failed bid in 2004 to house the Michigan Department of Community Health, and a 2008 proposal to convert the building to a performing arts center. During the 2008–2009 academic year, the Michigan State University interior design program used the redevelopment of the building as the basis for its senior thesis. Resulting proposals included a variety of commercial and residential uses.

In 2010, plans were announced to redevelop the building for mixed residential, office and commercial use, subject to obtaining necessary governmental permits and obtaining tax credits, loans and grants, with construction initially planned to commence in 2011 and to be completed in 2013. The bands of glass block which give the building an external appearance of lightness, present a barrier to redevelopment due to the lack of outside views for prospective tenants. The redevelopment proposals include cutting a four-story glass atrium covered with a skylight from the second through fifth floors to give the interior more light, as well as replacement of the Maul Macotta panels, which have suffered water damage due to a design flaw in the metal banding not apparent in 1937 when they were installed, with modern metal or concrete counterparts. Construction eventually began in December 2012, with a 14-month construction schedule and a $36.5 million budget. The construction is now completed, and the building is home to numerous offices, shops, and apartments.
