= Mall at University Town Center =

Shopping mall in Sarasota County, Florida

The Mall at University Town Center
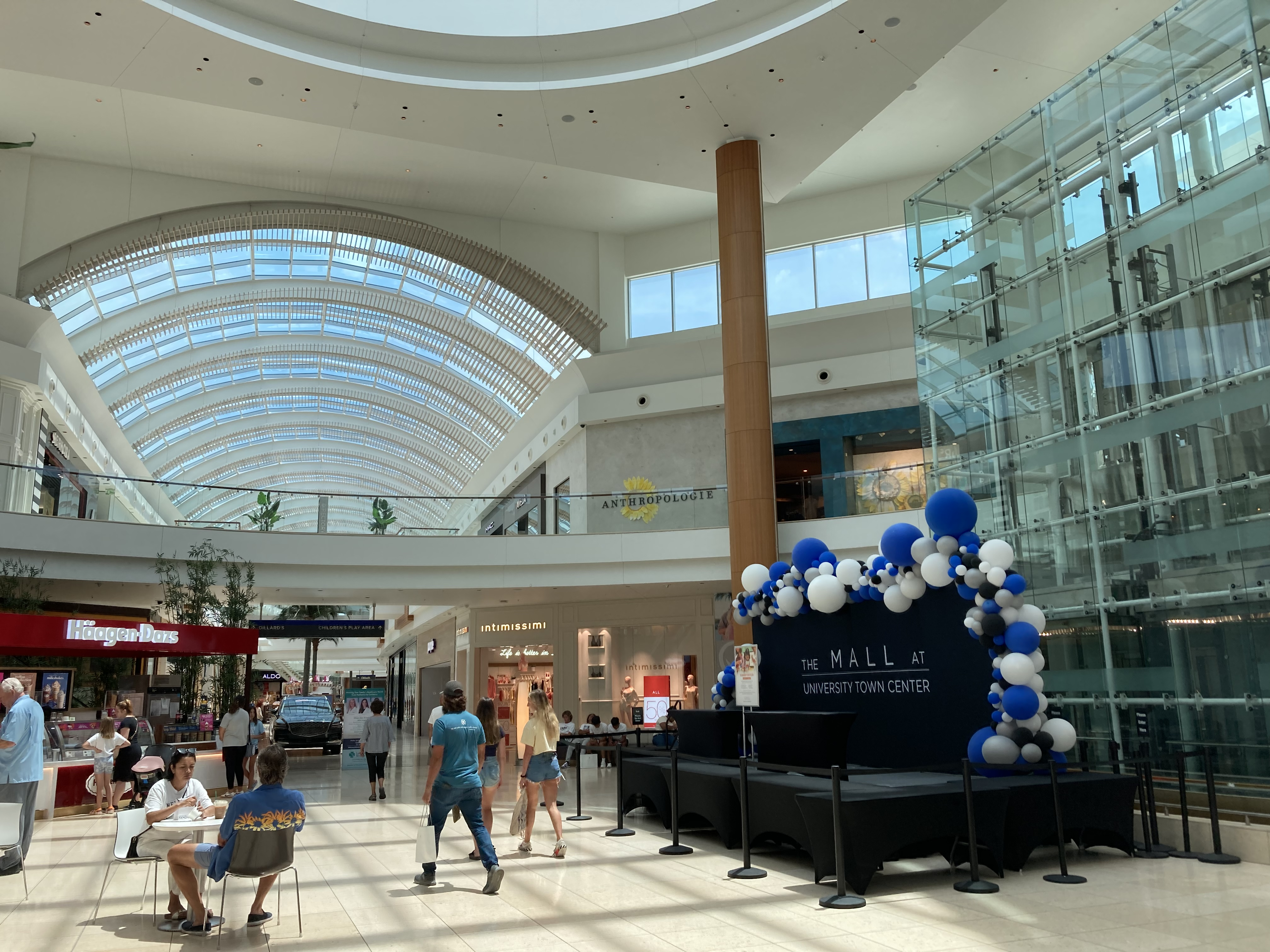
- Interior of The Mall at University Town Center
- Location: Sarasota, Florida, United States
- Coordinates: 27.3844°N 82.4529°W
- Address: 140 University Town Center Drive; Sarasota, FL 34243
- Opened: October 16, 2014; 12 years ago
- Developer: Taubman Centers and Benderson
- Manager: Simon Property Group and Benderson
- Owner: Simon Property Group and Benderson
- Architect: JPRA Architects
- Num. of stores: 150+
- Num. of anchor tenants: 3
- Floor area: 880,000 square feet (82,000 m^{2})
- Floors: 2
- Website: www.simon.com/mall/the-mall-at-university-town-center

The Mall at University Town Center is a shopping mall located in Sarasota County, Florida, United States, just south of the Manatee County line near the planned community of Lakewood Ranch. It opened on October 16, 2014 and is anchored by Saks Fifth Avenue, Macy's, and Dillard's, with Dick's House of Sport expected to open as the fourth anchor in 2027.

== History ==
Planning for The Mall at University Town Center began in 2002, when Benderson Corporation purchased the land and announced their intention to develop a regional shopping mall. In 2007, Nordstrom signed a letter of intent to open at the mall. Neiman Marcus and Macy's signed letters of intent soon after, with a planned groundbreaking in 2008 and a planned opening in 2010. The Taubman Corp. joined the project in May 2008, a 50/50 split with Benderson. In summer of 2009, the project was placed on hold due to the Great Recession, and all three signed-on anchor stores pulled out.

On October 15, 2012, a revamped Mall at University Town Center was unveiled. Macy's rejoined the project, this time with Dillard's and Saks Fifth Avenue. Groundbreaking occurred on October 15, 2012, and the mall officially opened on October 16, 2014. At the time of its opening, it was the first regional shopping center built in Sarasota in 35 years and was one of two enclosed malls that opened in the United States during 2014.

During the COVID-19 pandemic the mall closed on March 19, 2020, and reopened on May 6.

On March 6, 2026, Saks Global announced the closure of twelve Saks Fifth Avenue locations nationwide in an effort to cut costs, including the location at The Mall at University Town Center. A deal was reached between the landlord of the store and Saks Global to keep Saks Fifth Avenue store open at University Town Center.

As of June 2026, a two-story Dick's House of Sport is under construction as the fourth anchor tenant.

== The District at UTC ==
The District East and The District West are two shopping centers located just east and west of the Mall at UTC. The District West includes retailers such as Super Target, Old Navy, Best Buy, Ulta Beauty, Petco, and Dick's Sporting Goods. The District East is slated to include shopping, hotels, a movie theater and housing. Bordering Nathan Benderson Park, home of the 2017 World Rowing Championships. The District East is under development as of 2017.

On June 29, 2023, it was announced that Christmas Tree Shops would be closing as part of a plan to close all 82 stores nationwide. The store closed on August 12, 2023.
