= Parisian (department store) =

U.S. department store chain

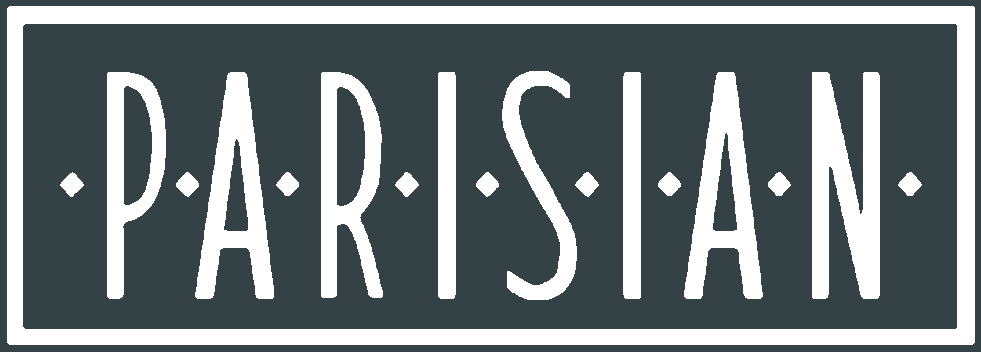
- Type: Department store
- Industry: Retail
- Founded: 1877; 149 years ago
- Defunct: 2007; 19 years ago
- Headquarters: Birmingham, Alabama, United States
- Products: Clothing, footwear, bedding, furniture, jewelry, beauty products, and housewares.
- Parent: Parisian (1877-1988); LJ Hooker (1988-1989); Independent (1989-1996); Proffitt's (1995-1998); Saks, Inc. (1998-2006)

Parisian Inc. (/pəˈriːʒən/, pə-REE-zhən) was an American chain of upmarket department stores founded and headquartered in Birmingham, Alabama. Competing mainly through the 1980s against Nordstrom, Neiman Marcus, and Gus Mayer, Parisian underwent a series of restructurings and mergers during its 130-year history, and was taken over by Proffitt’s, Inc. in 1996. In September 2006, Belk purchased Parisian from Saks for $285 million with twenty-four locations later becoming Belk by September 2007. Belk sold four stores in Michigan, Indiana, and Ohio to The Bon-Ton in October 2006. Bon-Ton operated these stores individually under the Parisian name until 2013 when the exclusive marketing rights to operate under the Parisian name expired, marking the end of this upmarket department store brand.

== History ==
=== Early history ===
Parisian was founded in Birmingham, Alabama in 1877 by Estella and Bertha Sommers. The sisters sold it to Carl Hess and William Holiner in the 1920s. Hess's son Emil and Holiner's son-in-law, Leonard Salit, bought the chain in 1950 and established its first credit program. After Salit died, Hess's family took over the chain.

Parisian opened stores in several shopping malls throughout Birmingham in the 1970s, including Eastwood Mall (now Eastwood Village). In the 1960s, it began opening stores outside Birmingham, first with a store in Gateway Shopping Center in Decatur, Alabama and then Parkway City Mall in Huntsville, University Mall in Tuscaloosa, Bel Air Mall in Mobile, and Eastdale Mall and Montgomery Mall in Montgomery. By the mid-1980s, Parisian had 13 stores in Alabama. Its first two stores outside the state were both in Florida at Cordova Mall in Pensacola and Sarasota Square Mall (now Westfield Sarasota Square) in Sarasota. Australian-based real estate firm LJ Hooker bought Parisian, Bonwit Teller, and B. Altman in 1988, but sold its share in Parisian back to the Hess family a year later after filing for bankruptcy. By the early 1990s, Parisian had opened its first stores outside the Southeastern United States in Michigan, Indiana, and Ohio. In the mid 1990s, two new stores opened in Florida at Seminole Towne Center and The Avenues.

=== Acquisition by Proffitt's in 1995 ===
In 1995, Proffitt's Inc. bought 38-store Parisian for $200 million and assumed Parisian's $250 million debt. Proffitt's, which had acquired McRae's two years before, also acquired Herberger's and Younkers in 1996. In 1997, Proffitt's included five brands: 19 Proffitt's stores, mostly in Tennessee; 29 McRae's stores in Alabama and Mississippi; 48 Younkers stores, mostly in Iowa, Wisconsin and Michigan; 40 Parisian stores; and 39 Herberger's stores, concentrated in the Midwest.

Proffitt's continued to make acquisitions, buying the Carson Pirie Scott chain of 52 stores in the Midwest in 1997 and Brody's in North Carolina in 1998. Proffitt's bought Saks Fifth Avenue for $2.1 billion in 1998, which included 100 Saks stores and 40 discount Off 5th outlet stores, and changed its own name from Proffitt's, Inc. to Saks Incorporated.

At its height, Saks Incorporated operated more than 250 medium to high-end department stores under its Saks Fifth Avenue Enterprises group, the Parisian division, the Northern Department Store Group (Younkers, Herberger's, Carson Pirie Scott, Bergner's, Boston Store), and its Southern Department Store Group (Proffitt's and McRae's) — plus more than 50 Club Libby Lu specialty shops.

=== Sale of Parisian to Belk in 2006 ===
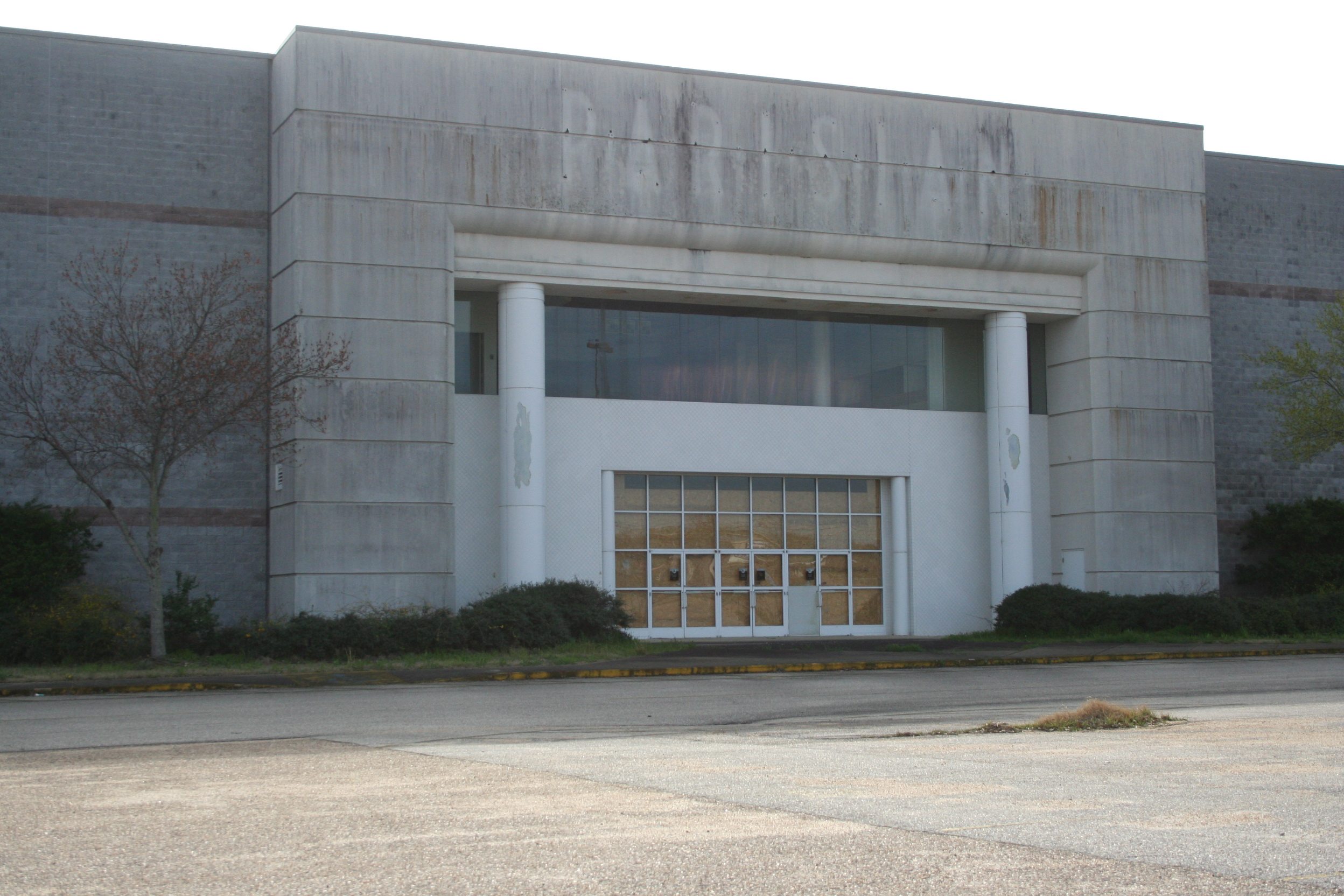
Parisian label scar at Montgomery Mall in Montgomery, Alabama

Belk, Inc., a privately held department store chain based in Charlotte, North Carolina purchased the Proffitt's and McRae's stores from Saks on March 8, 2006, and immediately converted them to Belk. On August 2, 2006, Belk announced the $285 million purchase of Parisian from Saks with Belk later announcing plans for twenty-four Parisian locations to become Belk by September 12, 2007. With the Parisian transaction complete, Belk operates 315 stores in 19 states. That transaction included 38 Parisian department stores, a 125,000-square-foot (11,600 m^{2}) administrative/headquarters facility in Birmingham, Alabama, and a 171,000-square-foot (15,900 m^{2}) distribution center in Steele, Alabama.

=== Bon-Ton agreement ===
On October 25, 2006 Belk announced the $22 million ($32.8 million in 2024) sale of four Parisian locations and the rights for the construction of a fifth store to The Bon-Ton Stores, Inc. Under the agreement, Bon-Ton was allowed to operate the four locations under the Parisian nameplate for an agreed amount of time. Despite the agreement, Parisian ceased to exist in 2006, and the remaining stores operated as Bon-Ton Stores using the Parisian name. The stores were located in:

- Livonia, Michigan – Laurel Park Place – 148,800 sq ft (13,820 m^{2}).
- Rochester Hills, Michigan – The Village of Rochester Hills – 120,500 sq ft (11,190 m^{2}).
- Beavercreek, Ohio – The Mall at Fairfield Commons – 130,200 sq ft (12,100 m^{2}). – became an Elder-Beerman. The store was consolidated to a separate store at the mall by Elder-Beerman in 2014, and the structure will be torn down in 2015 to make room for new restaurant construction.
- Indianapolis, Indiana – Circle Centre – 144,000 sq ft (13,400 m^{2}). – former site of the L. S. Ayres flagship store – Became Carson Pirie Scott. Store closed in Spring 2018.
- Clinton Township, Michigan – The Mall at Partridge Creek – 120,000 sq ft (11,000 m^{2}). (opened October 18, 2007; first Parisian opened under Bon-Ton)

By 2012, stores located in Laurel Park Place in Livonia, The Mall at Partridge Creek in Clinton Township, and The Village of Rochester Hills in Rochester Hills, continued to operate under the Parisian name. In January 2013, Bon-Ton's exclusive rights to operate the stores as Parisian expired, marking the end of this upscale department store brand.
