= Cato Corporation =

American women's clothing retailer

The Cato Corporation
- Company type: Public
- Traded as: NYSE: CATO (Class A); Russell 2000 Index component
- Industry: Apparel stores
- Founded: 1946
- Founder: Wayland Cato
- Headquarters: Charlotte, North Carolina, U.S.
- Number of locations: 1,372
- Key people: John P. Derham Cato; President and CEO
- Revenue: ▲US$1.01 billion (2016)
- Operating income: ▲US$95.93 million (2016)
- Net income: ▲US$66.84 million (2016)
- Total assets: ▲US$642.34 million (2016)
- Total equity: ▲US$412.66 million (2016)
- Number of employees: 10,500 (January 2016)
- Website: www.catofashions.com

The Cato Corporation is an American retailer of women's fashions and accessories. The company is headquartered in Charlotte, North Carolina. As of January 2016, the company operated 1,372 stores under the names Cato, Cato Plus, It's Fashion, It's Fashion Metro and Versona.

== History ==
In 1946, the company founder, Wayland Cato, left United Merchants to launch his own business in Charlotte with his sons, Wayland Henry Cato, Jr., and Edgar Thomas.

Five main-street stores were opened in the first year, with two more being opened in 1947. Earnings for that year were $404,000. The company continued to open stores through the 1950s, including some in shopping centers.

The company went public in 1968, took itself private in 1980, then went public again in 1987. Early in the 1990s, the business avoided bankruptcy by implementing a new discount pricing strategy and updating its inventory.

Cato stores are typically located in strip malls anchored by a national discounter like Walmart.

== Store divisions ==
- Cato and Cato Plus—Junior, misses and plus sizes
- It's Fashion—Juniors, and Plus size
- It's Fashion Metro—Larger It's Fashion stores that also include clothing for men, big and tall men, infants and toddlers
- Versona -- "Exclusive" apparel and accessories

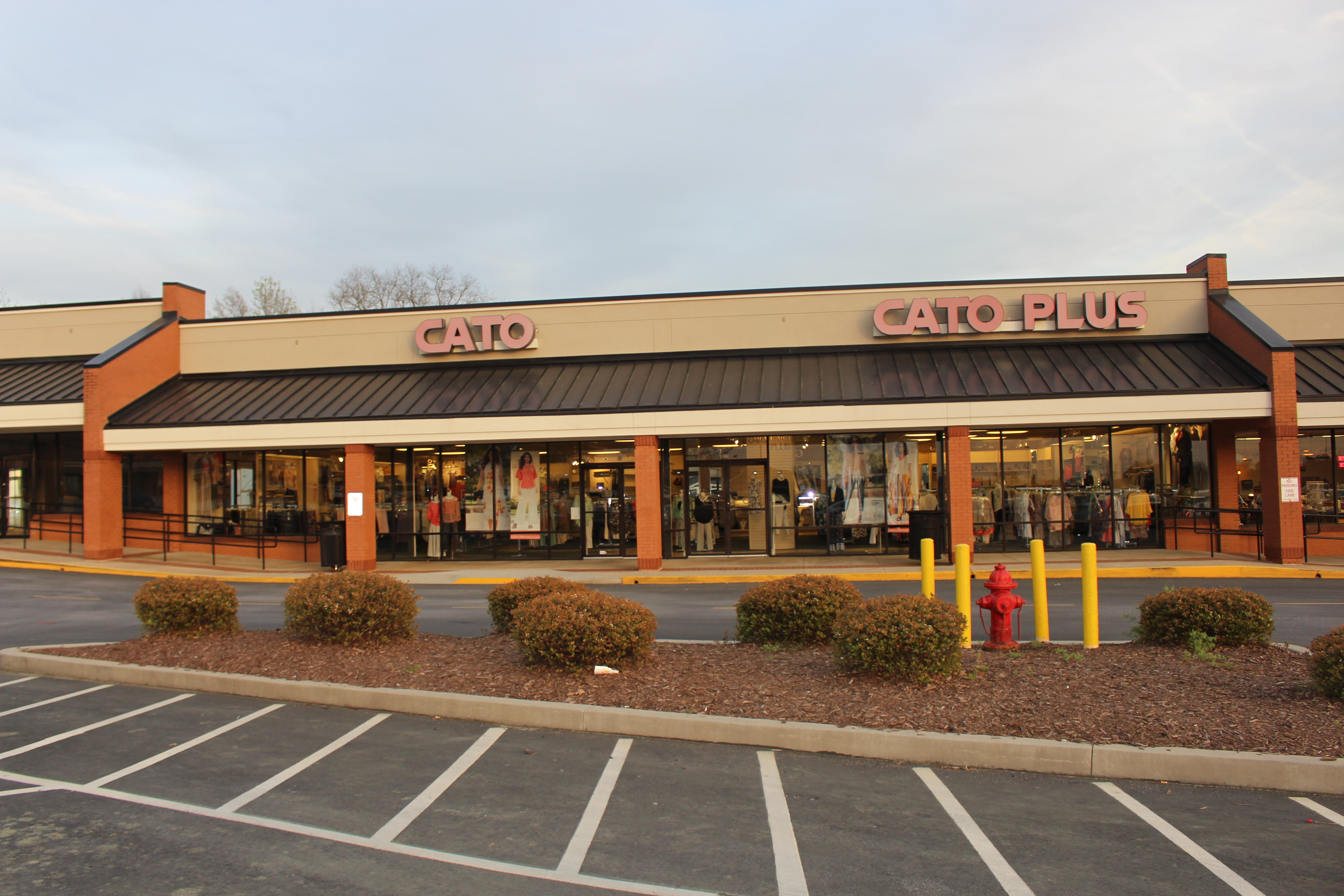
Cato and Cato Plus in Griffin, Georgia
