= Montgomery Mall (Alabama) =

Former shopping mall in Montgomery, Alabama

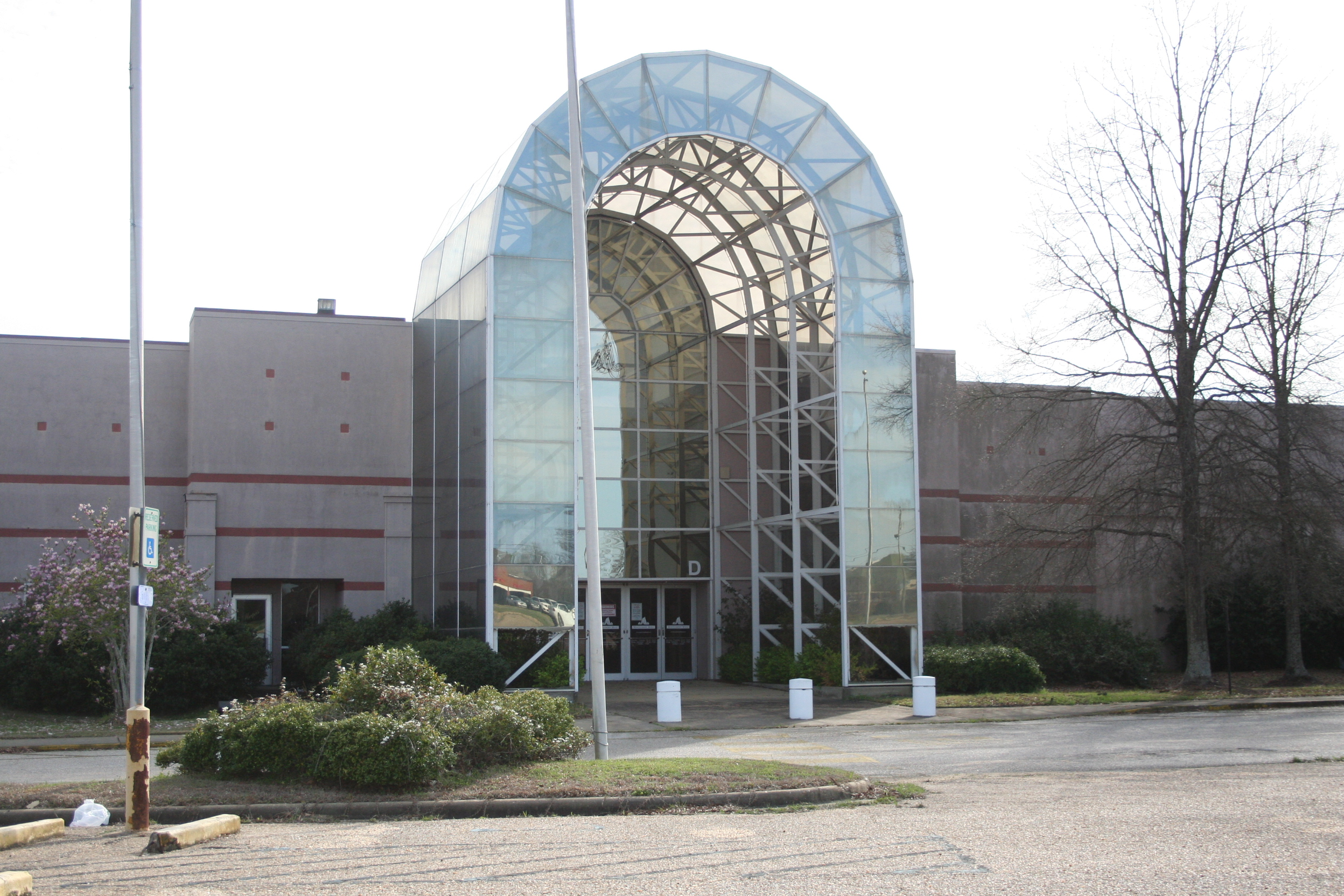
- Entrance to Montgomery Mall, March 2013
- Location: Montgomery, Alabama, United States
- Coordinates: 32.3293°N 86.2460°W
- Address: 2899 E. South Blvd.
- Opened: 1970
- Closed: September 22, 2008
- Developer: Jim Wilson & Associates
- Num. of stores: approx. 100
- Floor area: 726,882 sq ft (67,529.5 m^{2})
- Floors: 1

Montgomery Mall was an enclosed shopping mall in Montgomery, Alabama, United States. Opened in 1970, it closed in 2008 after several years of declining traffic. In February 2013, redevelopment began on the vacant mall property. Three former anchor tenants buildings are occupied by Loveless Academic Magnet Program (LAMP) High School, Montgomery Preparatory Academy for Career Technologies (MPACT), and the City of Montgomery Department of Public Safety which encompasses the South Central Montgomery Police Department.

== History ==
Montgomery Mall opened in 1970 with Montgomery Fair and JCPenney as its anchor stores. Other major tenants at the time included Lerner New York, Morrison's Cafeteria, Singer Sewing Center, and Elmore Variety Store. The Montgomery Fair store was later rebranded Gayfers. An expansion, begun in 1987 and completed in 1988, added a new wing anchored by Parisian.

In 1998, Glimcher Realty Trust bought the mall for $70 million. By the early 2000s, several stores had begun to close in the mall, including Piccadilly Cafeteria, Gap, Eddie Bauer, Ruby Tuesday, and American Eagle Outfitters. Both JCPenney and Dillard's, which acquired the Gayfers chain in 1998, closed their stores at Montgomery Mall in 2005. JCPenney relocated to a new store at Eastdale Mall, while Dillard's moved to The Shoppes at Eastchase.

Although Steve & Barry's replaced the former Dillard's in early 2005, Parisian closed in 2006, as did several other stores. In 2007, Montgomery mayor Bobby Bright criticized Glimcher as using the mall for a tax write-off, and said that they "never showed willingness" to improve it. Glimcher sold off the mall in May 2007. The mall closed on September 22, 2008, with Steve & Barry's staying until September of that year.

In May 2011, Keith Corporation announced plans to purchase 440,000 square feet of mall space, including the former JCPenney store, for conversion to health offices. Redevelopment began in February 2013. Under the redevelopment plans, the former Steve & Barry's building became a fire station, the former JCPenney became a magnet high school, and the former Parisian is used by Montgomery Technical Education Center.

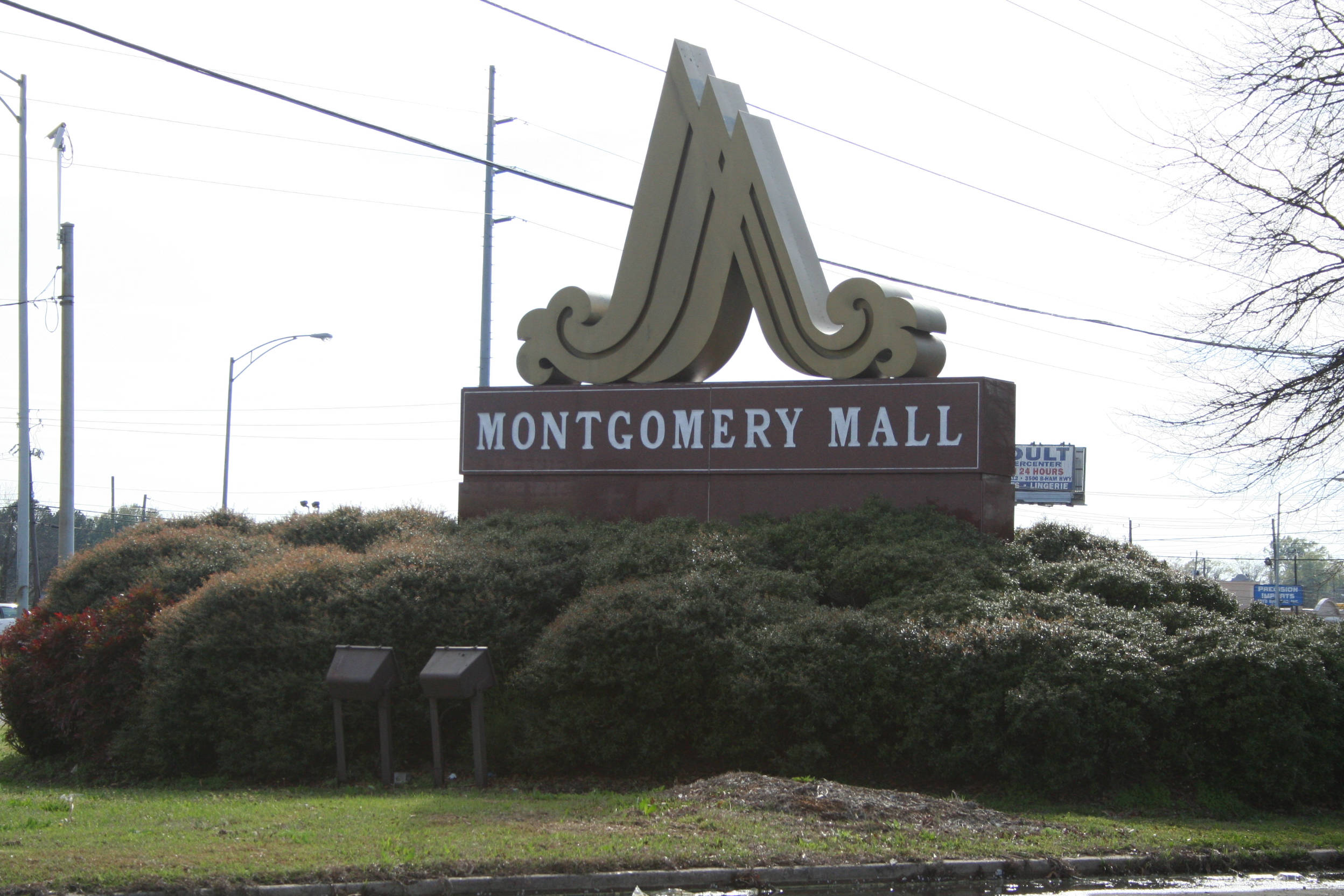
Sign for Montgomery Mall, March 2013
