= Westwood Mall (Jackson, Michigan) =

- Location: Jackson, Michigan
- Coordinates: 42.250°N 84.436°W
- Address: 1850 W. Michigan Ave.
- Opened: August 3, 1972; 54 years ago
- Developer: Forbes-Cohen
- Manager: Kohan Retail Investment Group
- Owner: Kohan Retail Investment Group; Summit Properties USA
- Num. of stores: 24
- Num. of anchor tenants: 3 (2 open, 1 vacant)
- Floor area: 510,000 square feet (47,000 m^{2}) (GLA)
- Floors: 1 plus 2nd floor which is mall staff only
- Public transit: JATA
- Website: shopwestwoodmall.com

Westwood Mall is an enclosed shopping mall serving the community of Jackson, Michigan. It opened in 1972 and the mall's anchor stores are JCPenney and Walmart. There is 1 vacant anchor store that was once Younkers.

== History ==
The mall opened on August 3, 1972 with Wurzburg's and Montgomery Ward as its anchor stores, but Wurzburg's sold its store to J.W. Knapp Company shortly before completion. Original tenants included Claire's, Motherhood Maternity, Kinney Shoes, Waldenbooks, Spencer Gifts, Circus World Toys, Merle Norman Cosmetics, and Walgreens. The Knapp store sold to JCPenney in 1980. Elder-Beerman was added as a third anchor in September 1993. General Growth Properties acquired the mall from Forbes/Cohen in 1998, along with nearby Lansing Mall and Lakeview Square Mall.

In 2004, Walmart opened its first Jackson location on the site vacated by Montgomery Ward three years prior. Five years later, the company expressed interest in purchasing houses behind the mall to build a retention basin.

Several stores closed in the mall in the late 2000s, including Gap, Ritz Camera and an original tenant, Crown & Carriage Gifts. Despite the loss of these stores, the mall retained a higher occupancy rate than the national average. The Elder-Beerman store was re-branded Younkers in 2012.

On April 18, 2018, it was announced that Younkers would be closing as parent company The Bon-Ton Stores was going out of business. The store closed on August 31, 2018.

In February 2021, the mall was sold to the Kohan Retail Investment Group.
