= List of shopping malls in Alabama =

The state of Alabama includes over 30 shopping malls. The largest in the state is Riverchase Galleria in Hoover.

Name	Location	Gross leasable area sq ft / m²	Format	Owner
Crossroads Mall	Albertville		Enclosed	BV Belk
Auburn Mall (1973–present)	Auburn	524,097 square feet (48,690 m^{2})	Enclosed	Hull Storey Gibson
Colonial Brookwood Village (1973–present)	Birmingham	750,754 square feet (69,747 m^{2})	Enclosed	Colonial Properties
Pinnacle at Tutwiler Farm (October 11, 2006–present)	Trussville	644,000 square feet (59,830 m^{2})	Lifestyle	Jones Lang LaSalle
The Summit (October 1997–present)	Birmingham	1,000,000 square feet (92,903 m^{2})	Lifestyle	Bayer Properties
Western Hills Mall (1969–present)	Fairfield	547,926 square feet (50,904 m^{2})	Enclosed	Aronov Realty
Decatur Mall (1978–present)	Decatur	575,947 square feet (53,507 m^{2})	Enclosed	Urban Retail
Wiregrass Commons (August 1986–present)	Dothan	638,554 square feet (59,324 m^{2})	Enclosed	CBL & Associates Properties
Florence Mall (1978–present)	Florence	600,000 square feet (55,742 m^{2})	Enclosed	Hull Storey Gibson
Gadsden Mall (July 31, 1974–present)	Gadsden	502,591 square feet (46,692 m^{2})	Enclosed	Spinoso Real Estate Group
Pelican Place at Craft Farms (2008–present)	Gulf Shores	372,000 square feet (34,560 m^{2})	Open air	Langley Properties
Riverchase Galleria (February 19, 1986–present)	Hoover	1,570,000 square feet (146,000 m^{2})	Enclosed	Brookfield Properties Retail Group
Bridge Street Town Centre (November 1, 2007–present)	Huntsville	550,000 square feet (51,097 m^{2})	Lifestyle	Miller Capital
Parkway Place (October 16, 2002–present)	Huntsville	643,135 square feet (59,749 m^{2})	Enclosed	CBL & Associates Properties
Jasper Mall (August 8, 1981–present)	Jasper	350,000 square feet (32,516 m^{2})	Enclosed	Sharp Realty
The Shoppes at Bel Air (August 16, 1967–present)	Mobile	1,345,000 square feet (124,955 m^{2})	Enclosed	4th Dimension Properties
Eastdale Mall (1977–present)	Montgomery	964,717 square feet (89,625 m^{2})	Enclosed	Aronov Realty
The Shoppes at Eastchase (November 2002–present)	Montgomery	725,000 square feet (67,355 m^{2})	Lifestyle	Bayer Properties
Southgate Mall (1968–present)	Muscle Shoals	499,110 square feet (46,369 m^{2})	Enclosed	Aronov Realty
Quintard Mall (August 1970–present)	Oxford	720,000 square feet (66,890 m^{2})	Enclosed	Grimmer family
High Point Town Center (2008–present)	Prattville	900,000 square feet (83,613 m^{2})	Lifestyle	AIG Baker
Village Shopping Center	Scottsboro		Outdoor	
Selma Mall (1971–present)	Selma	330,617 square feet (30,715 m^{2})	Enclosed	Aronov Realty
Eastern Shore Centre (November 17, 2004–present)	Spanish Fort	540,000 square feet (50,000 m^{2})	Lifestyle	Jim Wilson & Associates
Midtown Village	Tuscaloosa	344,000 square feet (32,000 m^{2})	Lifestyle	Cypress Equities
University Mall (August 20, 1980–present)	Tuscaloosa	733,254 square feet (68,122 m^{2})	Enclosed	Aronov Realty
Boaz Plaza Center	Boaz	13,000 square feet (1,208 m^{2})	Enclosed	
Tanger Outlet Foley	Foley	600,000 square feet (55,742 m^{2})	Open air	Tanger Factory Outlet Centers
The Outlet Shops of Grand River	Leeds	350,000 square feet (32,516 m^{2})	Open air	The Outlet Shops of Grand River
Patton Creek Shopping Center	Hoover	600,000 square feet (55,742 m^{2})	Open air	AIG Baker
The Wharf	Orange Beach	375,103 square feet (34,848 m^{2})	Open air	
Cox Creek Shopping Center	Florence	473,932.8 square feet (44,030 m^{2})	Enclosed	

== Defunct ==
Name	Location	Gross leasable area (sq ft / m²)	Format	Closed / de-malled	Demolished / redeveloped
Century Plaza (1975–2009)	Birmingham	450,000 sq ft (42,000 m^{2})	Enclosed	May 31, 2009	Demolition began in November 2020
Dunnavant's Mall	Huntsville	111,300 sq ft (10,340 m^{2}) (after expansion)	Enclosed	c. 1988	Converted into Huntsville Hospital Medical Mall; date not established
Eastwood Mall (1960–2006)	Birmingham	750,000 sq ft (70,000 m^{2}) (1967)	Enclosed	August 1, 2004 (interior)	Demolished in summer 2006; replaced by Eastwood Village
Heart of Huntsville Mall (1961–2007)	Huntsville	195,000 sq ft (18,100 m^{2}) (original)	Open-air (original)	2007	Demolition began in 2007
Madison Square Mall (1984–2017)	Huntsville	Nearly 1,000,000 sq ft (93,000 m^{2})	Enclosed	January 29, 2017	Demolition began in February 2017; redeveloped as MidCity District
The Mall	Huntsville	425,000 sq ft (39,500 m^{2})	Enclosed	Exact closure date unknown	Demolished around 1998; replaced by The Fountain
McFarland Mall (1969–2016)	Tuscaloosa	497,000 sq ft (46,200 m^{2})	Enclosed	September 1, 2016	Demolition began in 2014; final remaining structure demolished August 6, 2025
Meadowbrook Mall (later Bama Mall)	Tuscaloosa	171,000 sq ft (15,900 m^{2})	Enclosed	1995 (last indoor tenant)	Progressively de-malled from 1995 to 2001; converted into McFarland Plaza
Montgomery Mall (1970–2008)	Montgomery	700,000 sq ft (65,000 m^{2})	Enclosed	September 22, 2008	Partial redevelopment began in 2013; reused as One Center for educational, medical and civic purposes
Normandale Shopping Center	Montgomery		Shopping center	No definitive full closure date established	Partial demolition began in August 2018
Northside Mall	Dothan		Shopping center	2010 (redevelopment completed)	Major redevelopment and partial demolition proposed in October 2008; completion date unverified
Porter Square Mall	Dothan		Shopping center	Exact mall closure date unknown (reconverted in 2020–2022)	Conversion into Kingdom Life Center announced in September 2020
Springdale Mall	Mobile		Formerly enclosed	Progressively de-malled during the 2000s (enclosed mall portion closed in 2009)	Partially demolished and converted to a primarily open-air shopping center during the 2000s; retail activity continues
Vestavia Mall	Vestavia Hills			around 2001	Unknown
Westlake Mall (1969–2009)	Bessemer	323,000 sq ft (30,000 m^{2})	Enclosed	2009	Conversion into Marvel City Business Park announced in 2025; completion not established
