= Springdale Mall =

Coordinates: 30.67845°N 88.12297°W

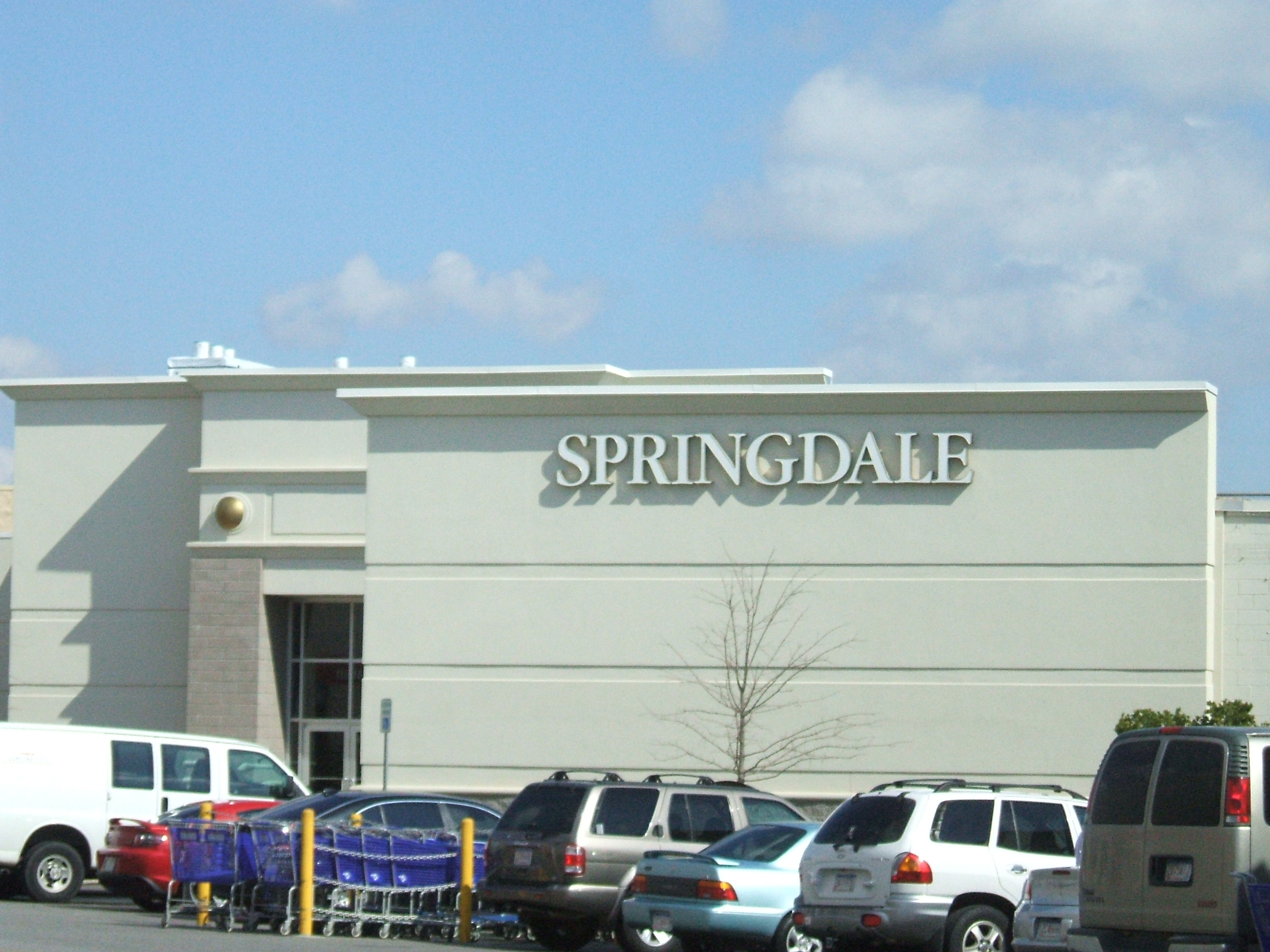
- Springdale Mall's current entrance is located just east of the site of the Dillard's court.
- Location: 3250 Airport Boulevard, Mobile, Alabama
- Opened: November 1959
- Closed: 2009 (indoor only)
- Manager: Brixmor
- Owner: Brixmor
- Num. of stores: 16
- Num. of anchor tenants: 7
- Floors: 1 (2nd floor currently vacant.)
- Website: brixmor.propertycapsule.com/cre/commercial-real-estate-listings/Mobile/AL/springdale/#overview

Springdale Mall is a shopping center located in Mobile, Alabama, United States, directly across from The Shoppes at Bel Air. Opened in 1959 as an open-air shopping center, Springdale Mall was later redeveloped as an enclosed shopping center. Facing competition from larger shopping centers in the area, Springdale was demolished in stages in the 2000s, with most of the former enclosed mall being replaced with big-box stores.

Springdale is almost entirely an open-air center again, featuring Bealls, Burlington Coat Factory, Cost Plus World Market, Crunch Fitness, Five Below, Marshalls, Sam's Club, and Shoe Station as anchor stores. The center is managed and owned by Brixmor.

== History ==
Opened in November 1959 as an open-air regional shopping center, Springdale was initially anchored by W.T. Grant, JCPenney and two supermarkets: Delchamps and National. Gayfers, a Mobile-based department store, would serve as the flagship anchor upon its completion in the summer of 1960.

Competition would arrive in late 1967 in the form of Bel Air Mall, an enclosed mall which was anchored by Sears and Hammel's. JCPenney relocated to Bel Air Mall in 1974.

An enclosed wing was completed in 1974, adjacent to the east end of the Gayfers building; this wing was anchored by Montgomery Ward and Alabama's first multiplex movie theater in an enclosed mall, the six screen Springdale Six operated by AMC. Lionel Playworld would open a 34,500 square foot toy superstore at the west end of the open air Springdale Plaza in November 1980. Texas-based Solo Stores would arrive in fall 1984. In October 1988, Toys "R" Us co-tenanted the Montgomery Ward building with a 45,000 square foot space. A second enclosed wing was added November 1989, leading from Gayfers to an existing McRae's store that opened August 1984. This "west mall" featured more nationally known in-line retailers such as The Limited, Express and Victoria's Secret. During this same late 1980s time frame, Gayfers expanded to more than 280,000 square feet (26,000 m^{2}) on three levels, becoming one of the largest department store buildings in the Gulf Coast region. After the completion of the west wing, the mall comprised two separate enclosed wings, as well as the original, remodeled 1950s open-air wing.

Springdale Mall both inside and out was featured in a motorcycle chase sequence in the 1994 film Raw Justice.

Barnes & Noble debuted its first South Alabama location in Springdale in the spring of 1994, followed by Old Navy, which opened its first Alabama store here, two years later, in the fall of 1996.

== Renovations ==
Springdale Mall was purchased in 1997 by CBL & Associates Properties, who had planned a substantial expansion of mall space in front of the Montgomery Ward building. In August 1998, Mercantile Stores, the owners of Gayfers and a host of regional department store nameplates, was purchased by Arkansas-based Dillard's. Although a full-line Dillard's was present across the street in Bel Air Mall, Dillard's initially maintained the former Gayfers at Springdale as a full-line Dillard's as well.

Also in 1998, Montgomery Ward closed its doors at Springdale Mall and its 104,000 square foot space was replaced with Burlington Coat Factory in Spring 1999. Office supply retailer Staples opened a 24,000 square foot store adjacent to the main entrance in fall 1999. In 2004, Toys "R" Us relocated to a new store on the site of the former Bel Air Village shopping center.

Throughout the late 1990s and into the 2000s, several more big-box stores were added to the mall's tenant roster. The first of these, Goody's Family Clothing, was added in 1998, followed by Staples and Linens 'n Things, both of which took up portions of the east mall. The former "west mall" from McRae's to Dillard's was gutted in 2001 for a Best Buy while Dillard's itself closed a year later.

By 2004, the former Dillard's was demolished, as was part of the mall's original enclosed wing; Staples, Linens 'n Things, Springdale Cinema and one in-line tenant space were all retained, as was the mall corridor leading to the theater entry. The year 2005 was a time of transition, as on the site formerly occupied by Dillard's, a Sam's Club wholesale warehouse was constructed, McRae's was acquired by Belk, and the Springdale Cinema was shuttered.

In 2008, Springdale Plaza would lose both the Goody's Family Clothing and Linens 'n Things anchors, as those chains succumbed to bankruptcy. Man Style, the only remaining store inside the enclosed east wing, moved to an outparcel on the property around this time as well. The enclosed wing is inaccessible to the public.

Barnes & Noble closed its Springdale Plaza location at the end of June 2010, after not being able to reach an agreement on the terms of its lease. Soon after, FYE closed their Springdale location, while still maintaining a store in Bel Air Mall across the street.

Discount retailer Big Lots renovated the former Linens 'n Things location and opened in November 2010.

Fashion retailer Marshalls opened in the renovated Goody's space Fall of 2010. This new store, a relocation from the nearby Mobile Festival Centre power center, is nearly 33,000 square feet (3,100 m^{2}) in size.

Arts & crafts retailer Michaels relocated into the former Barnes & Noble space in September 2011. Like Marshalls, they also vacated their former location at the Mobile Festival Centre. The renovated location is oriented towards Airport Blvd. Right next door, beauty retailer Ulta moved into the former FYE space in order to open a new 12,017-square-foot (1,116.4 m^{2}) store in the fall of 2011.

== Vacancies and redevelopment ==
With the recent renovation of Bel Air Mall into The Shoppes of Bel Air, Sears left the mall in September 2015 and was replaced by a Belk flagship store a year later. The Springdale location of Belk closed before the opening of the Belk Flagship. This was redeveloped into smaller stores in 2018.

In addition, Best Buy constructed a new store at the brand new McGowin Park shopping center nearby and moved out of Springdale in January 2016. Old Navy also constructed a new location in McGowin Park as well and moved out in March 2016.

Staples Inc. closed its Mobile location on mid-January 2017 and remains vacant.

In Spring 2018, it was announced that the whole two-level McRae's/Belk space will be renovated to make room for Bed Bath & Beyond, Cost Plus World Market, and Shoe Station which is set to move from its founding building near The Shoppes of Bel Air; leaving the upper floor vacant. Bed Bath & Beyond (which moved from Festival Centre) and Cost Plus World Market opened in November 2018.

Burke's Outlet (now Bealls Outlet) renovated the former Old Navy location and opened on September 27, 2018.

Burlington Coat Factory relocated into the former Best Buy space as Burlington in Spring 2019, leaving Big Lots the last surviving store in the vacant mall portion of this shopping center. The original Burlington has been split into a Conn's, Crunch Fitness and a DaVita Dialysis Center in the rear portion.

During 2021, much of the former interior mall space including the former Springdale Theatres was demolished. Only the side facing Airport Blvd was kept, including any remaining interior corridor entrances.

Michaels closed and relocated to Pinebrook Shopping Center, where they originally had a store after relocating to Festival Centre and then Springdale. Part of the former Michaels has since become a Five Below. Locally owned store Rock The Float would also open in the former Staples Inc. location around this time.

Due to bankruptcy, Bed Bath & Beyond would close in 2023. Big Lots would also close in 2023 due to their current issues. Bed Bath & Beyond’s space would then be turned into a Overstock Furniture. Conn's would close in 2024.

== See also ==
- Bel Air Mall
- Cordova Mall
- Pelican Place at Craft Farms
