= McFarland Mall =

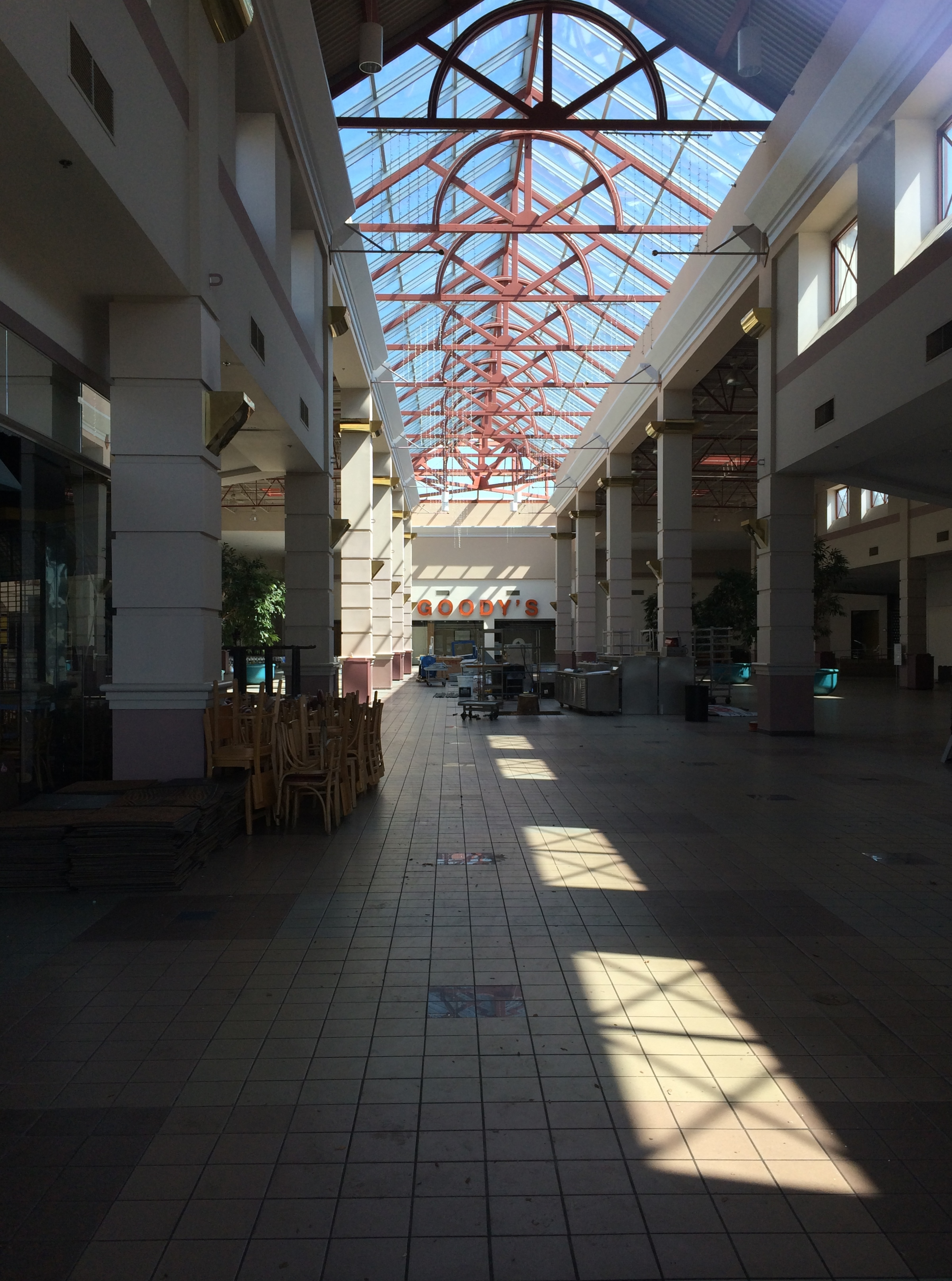
- Interior view of McFarland Mall, March 2014
- Location: Tuscaloosa, Alabama, U.S.
- Coordinates: 33°10′14.57″N 87°31′15.08″W
- Address: 900 Skyland Boulevard East
- Opened: February 19, 1969; 57 years ago
- Closed: September 1, 2016; 10 years ago (demolished by April 20, 2022)
- Developer: Ward Wharton McFarland and James Hinton
- Manager: Ward Morrow McFarland
- Owner: Stan Pate
- Num. of stores: 40 at peak
- Num. of anchor tenants: 4
- Floors: 1
- Website: Archived official website at the Wayback Machine (archived 2006-05-23)

McFarland Mall was a regional 497,000-square-foot (46,200 m^{2}) L-shaped shopping mall on Skyland Boulevard (U.S. Route 11) in Tuscaloosa, Alabama. Located near the interchange of Interstate 20/59 with McFarland Boulevard (U.S. Route 82), it was in the southern section of the city. Opening on February 19, 1969, the mall replaced Woods Square Shopping Center and Leland Shopping Center as the main commercial retail center in the Tuscaloosa area. Brandon Crawford and Associates of Birmingham was the architect for the mall. General contractor for the project was N.C. Morgan Construction Company of Tuscaloosa. McGiffert and Associates of Tuscaloosa provided the engineering services for the mall.

At its opening in 1969, McFarland Mall had 2 anchor stores, Woolco and Gayfers and 30 stores. At its height, McFarland Mall had 4 anchors, 40 stores, a 12-screen movie theater and a food court. Despite the opening of the larger University Mall in 1980, the mall survived an additional 30 years. However, the mall saw a steady 10-year decline during the 2000s following the closing of two anchors. Redevelopment was slated for 2013.

== History ==
McFarland Mall opened at 9:30 am on February 19, 1969. Tuscaloosa Mayor George Van Tassel and Tuscaloosa County Probate Judge John Puryear held the ribbon at the mall's main entrance. Mary Katherine Hinton, 7, and Elizabeth Russell Hinton, 5, daughters of co-developer, James "Jimmy" Hinton, cut the ribbon, signaling the opening of the mall.

Stores opening that day included: The ABC (Alabama Beverage Control) Store, Auto-Lec, Bell Shoes, Butler's Shoes, City National Bank, Drapery Shop (Drapes, Inc.), Eleanor Shop, Fair Snacks, Gayfers, Gilberg's Fabrics, Lawson's Gifts, Lorch's Diamond Shop, Mall Barber Shop, Mall Shoe Repair, McArthur Furniture, Munford Do-It-Yourself, Myrl's Boutique, Newsom Record Shop, Northington Laundry, Orange Julius, Paul Brown Hallmark Cards Shop, Pizitz, Postle Appliance Center, Raymon's, Singer Sewing Center, U.S. Post Office, Wagner's Shoes, Webster's Men's Wear, and WTBC Radio Station.

Stores scheduled to open later were: Baskin Robbins, Chuck Collins Studio, Color Corner Photo Service, Jacobs Drug and Cafeteria, Lee Roy Jordan's Flaming Steakhouse, Loft Candy, NGC Twin Theaters, Spiller's Pet Center, and The Swiss Colony.

Ward Morrow McFarland, son of co-developer, Ward W. McFarland, was the appointed mall manager.

The center was originally developed at an estimated $4.5 million by Ward Wharton McFarland and James Hinton. When it opened, McFarland Mall was the sixth fully enclosed mall constructed in the state of Alabama after Eastwood Mall in Birmingham, Heart of Huntsville Mall and The Mall in Huntsville, Bel Air Mall in Mobile and Southgate Mall in Muscle Shoals. Gayfers, Woolco (which had opened in November 1967), and Winn-Dixie (which had opened in an out-parcel in 1968) anchored the one-story new mall. Gayfers added a second floor to its store in 1975 and remained the only two-story tenant. Woolco closed in 1983 and was replaced by Zayre that same year. Following the demise of Zayre in 1989, the anchor space was divided into several smaller spaces. Jefferson Home Furniture (later Heilig-Meyers), T.J. Maxx and Drug Mart moved into the spaces, of which only T.J. Maxx opened out into the mall.

The mall saw significant renovations in 1980 and again in 1993, with the addition of a 320-seat food court under an enormous atrium and a new anchor space, occupied by Goody's Family Clothing. Winn-Dixie moved away from the mall and book retailer Books-A-Million moved into the out-parcel. Drug Mart became Shoe Station, and a Crafts, Etc. (later Michaels) store opened between Drug Mart and Heilig-Meyers in 1993. Heilig-Meyers closed in 2001 and was replaced by Sticks 'N' Stuff. Gayfers was acquired by Dillard's in 1998. The Fox 12 movie theater closed in 2004.

The mall remained under the ownership of the McFarland family through 2009. In May 2009, it was announced that Tuscaloosa developer Stan Pate had purchased the mall from Ward McFarland, Inc. ending the McFarland family association with the facility. The new owners have declared that they will be looking at many options to make the facility more profitable, from future renovations to completely demolishing the structure and building anew. McFarland is the second oldest enclosed mall in the state of Alabama with only Bel Air Mall being constructed earlier.

Following the closure of Dillard's in 2008 and Goody's the following year, the only remaining anchor was T.J. Maxx. The Dillard's wing was blocked off to the public in 2010.

=== Redevelopment ===
In December 2012, Stan Pate announced development plans to start sometime in 2013. Under these plans, most of the mall would have been demolished, including the former Dillard's building. Cheddar's Casual Café and Texas Roadhouse were also announced, and Books-A-Million was slated to move from an existing outparcel. Bed Bath & Beyond had also expressed interest in building a store on the property, which was to be renamed Encore Tuscaloosa. Cheddar's opened in April 2013; however, Books-a-Million closed their store in May 2013.

On March 19, 2014, the demolition commenced on the Dillards anchor store. The T.J. Maxx wing remained open with 3 indoor tenants and 3 tenants accessible from the exterior. As of June 15, 2015, T.J. Maxx, Classy Threads, and IT'S Fashion remained inside, but IT's Fashion would move to University Mall later that year. On March 1, 2016, T.J. Maxx left the mall and moved to McFarland Plaza in the former OfficeMax location. Shoe Station would also close and move to McFarland Plaza (in the former Shoe Carnival location) around the same time. Michaels had moved into the former Old Navy location at McFarland Plaza years earlier. Cheddar's closed later in 2016.

The former Sticks ’N’ Stuff hosted Spirit Halloween every year around the Halloween season until 2020, when it also moved to University Mall, taking over the former Sears anchor space. The former Books-A-Million hosted an antique shop called "Roadside Antiques", which sold a lot of stuff some of which was formerly owned by Pate (this store was demolished in 2024). Dollar Tree, the last operating business in McFarland Mall, closed in July 2025, with the building being demolished the following month.

On December 15, 2020, the demolition process began once again, starting with the former Chili's. Stan Pate's plan was to build a sportsplex over where the mall once stood. Demolition continued on February 23, 2021, with the old Woolco wing where Sticks ‘N’ Stuff, Michael's, Shoe Station, and TJ Maxx were housed for many years.

The process was concluded with the demolition of the former Goody's on April 20, 2022.

In 2024, it was announced that Stan Pate had decided to scrap the previous sportsplex plans in favor of plans for a brand new shopping center. Owner Stan Pate says the it will include "Retail, hotels, restaurants, coffee shops, ice cream shops," and so on. It is said to be bringing close to 1,000 jobs to Tuscaloosa.
