= Malbis, Alabama =

Unincorporated community in Alabama, United States

- Unincorporated community
- Location within the state of Alabama Malbis, Alabama (the United States)
- Coordinates: 30°39′21″N 87°51′07″W
- Country: United States
- State: Alabama
- County: Baldwin
- Elevation: 200 ft (60 m)
- Time zone: UTC-6 (Central (CST))
  - Summer (DST): UTC-5 (CDT)
- ZIP code: 36526 (Daphne); 36527 (Spanish Fort)
- Area code: 251
- GNIS feature ID: 0156648
- Website
- Malbis Plantation
- U.S. National Register of Historic Places
- Location within Alabama
- Location: 10145 US 90
- Nearest city: Daphne & Spanish Fort, Alabama, U.S.
- Built: 1906
- NRHP reference No.: 11000238
- Added to NRHP: May 10, 2011

Alabama Register of Landmarks and Heritage
- Designated: September 25, 2008

Malbis is an unincorporated community in Baldwin County, Alabama, United States. The community lies at the crossroads of U.S. 90 and Alabama State Route 181 just south of I-10. Portions of the settlement are today within the city limits of both Daphne and Spanish Fort. The city of Loxley lies to the east.

Malbis is considered a community or populated place but is not identified in the United States Census. It is part of the Daphne–Fairhope–Foley Micropolitan Statistical Area.

The Malbis Plantation was inducted into the National Register of Historic Places in May 2011.

== History ==
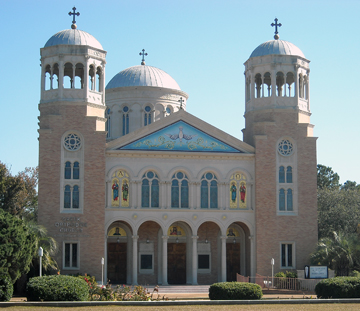
Malbis Memorial Church, built in honor of Jason Malbis

Known originally as the Malbis Plantation, the settlement was founded in 1906 by Jason Malbis. Malbis was a Greek philanthropist born in Doumena, Greece as Antonius Markopoulos. Malbis had been an Orthodox monk before coming to the United States to investigate the condition of fellow Greeks who had immigrated to the US. He changed his name to Jason Malbis and migrated south to Alabama.

While traveling through Alabama, Malbis became enamored with Baldwin County and purchased the land that would become the Greek colony. The community was populated for many years mostly by those of either secular or religious Greek heritage. The Malbis Memorial Church, a Greek Orthodox church, was built by the settlers and still stands today.

The community once included the Malbis Bakery, an ice plant, plant nursery, cannery, hotels, restaurants, its own power plant, turpentine, dairy, lumber, water towers and many acres of farmland. During the peak of the colony's success, the economy was largely based upon providing table food to nearby Mobile, Alabama. Much of the land was sold for commercial development, including a 500-acre (2.0 km^{2}) soybean field, which is currently covered by a large retail shopping mall known as Eastern Shore Centre.
