= Cordova Mall =

- Location: Pensacola, Florida, United States
- Coordinates: 30.47540°N 87.20763°W
- Opened: 1971
- Developer: Robert B. Aikens
- Manager: Simon Property Group
- Owner: Simon Property Group
- Num. of stores: 119
- Num. of anchor tenants: 8
- Floor area: 929,685 square feet (86,370.6 m^{2})
- Floors: 1 (Belk has 2 and Dillard's has 3)
- Parking: Available on-site.
- Website: www.simon.com/mall/cordova-mall

Cordova Mall, located in Pensacola, Florida, is the largest shopping center on the northwest Gulf Coast of Florida.

Opened in 1971 and renovated twice, in 1987 and 2008/2009, Cordova Mall comprises 929,685 square feet (86,370.6 m^{2}) of commercial property, with two major and six junior anchor stores. Five are situated in the mall (Dillard's, Belk, Dick's Sporting Goods, Old Navy, and Ross Dress for Less), and three are located in an open-air atmosphere (Best Buy, (Burlington and World Market). Until 2012, Dillard's operated two stores in the mall, which had been tenanted by D. H. Holmes and Gayfers. Montgomery Ward used to be located where World Market and Best Buy opened in 2001.

According to the Simon Property Group website, Cordova Mall is the third-most popular tourist destination in the Florida Panhandle, and serves eight million shoppers a year.

Office Depot opened next to the mall in 1992 during Labor Day weekend.

The mall was damaged in a tornado on October 18, 2007, although no injuries were reported.

In 2012, Dillard's closed its store in the former D. H. Holmes, consolidating all operations into the former Gayfers building. As a result, Belk moved from its existing location (which was previously the first Parisian store outside of Alabama until 2007) to the former D.H. Holmes/Dillard's, and Dick's Sporting Goods took over most of the store that had been Parisian and Belk. This also resulted in the closure of another Belk store at nearby University Mall (now University Town Plaza).

== See also ==
- Bel Air Mall
- Pelican Place at Craft Farms
- Springdale Mall
