= Westlake Center (disambiguation) =

Westlake Center is a mixed-use development in downtown Seattle, Washington, United States.

Westlake Center or Westlake Mall may also refer to:

- The Mall at Westlake, former shopping mall in Bessemer, Alabama, US
- Westlake Shopping Center in Daly City, California, US
