= World market =

World market can refer to any of the following:

- Market (economics)
- World economy
- World Market, an American chain of specialty/import retail stores
