= Pizitz Building =

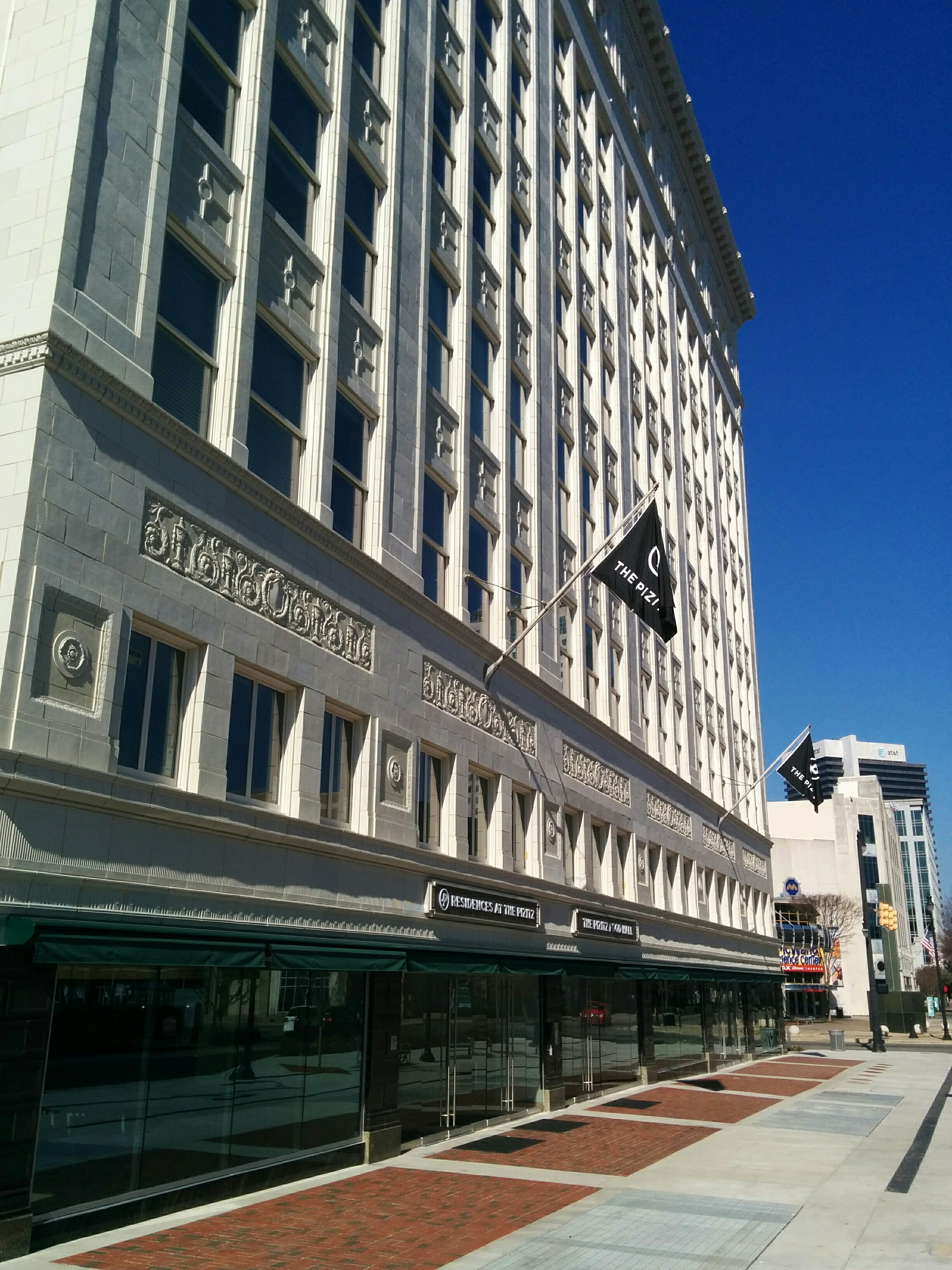
- The Pizitz Building in downtown Birmingham
- Location: Birmingham, Alabama, United States
- Coordinates: 33.5143°N 86.8079°W
- Address: 1821 Second Avenue North
- Opened: 1923 (department store); 2017 (redevelopment)
- Closed: 1988 (as Pizitz department store)
- Architect: Harry B. Wheelock
- Parking: Over 300 spaces (seven-level garage)
- Building details
- Former names: Pizitz Department Store

General information
- Type: Mixed-use building
- Completed: 1923; expanded in 1926

Technical details
- Floor count: 8 (original building)

The Pizitz Building is a historic building at 1821 Second Avenue North in downtown Birmingham, Alabama. It was the flagship store of the Pizitz department store chain until its closure in 1988. Originally constructed in 1923 and expanded in 1926, the building stood vacant for nearly three decades before being converted into apartments, retail space, restaurants and offices. The redevelopment formally opened in March 2017.

== History ==
=== Department store ===
The Pizitz department store chain was established in Birmingham in 1899 by Louis Pizitz, a Russian immigrant. It expanded over the following decades, eventually operating 13 stores in Alabama. The downtown location served as the company's flagship.

The building at 1821 Second Avenue North was constructed in two stages, in 1923 and 1926. Designed by Birmingham architect Harry B. Wheelock, the eight-story structure occupied a prominent position in the city's downtown shopping district.

The chain was sold to McRae's in the 1980s. The downtown department store closed in 1988, while other Pizitz locations were converted to McRae's stores.

=== Civil rights movement ===
During the era of racial segregation, the store's dining facilities were among those challenged by civil rights activists in Birmingham.

In August 1960, Frances Foster White, then a Black teenager, entered the Pizitz restaurant to challenge its segregation policy. She was arrested after requesting service. White later described her experience in an oral history interview conducted in 1996 at the Birmingham Civil Rights Institute.

Pizitz was again the site of demonstrations during the Birmingham campaign of 1963. In April, its lunch counter was closed after Black demonstrators requested service. Later that month, seven demonstrators were arrested outside the store. On May 10, white supremacists threw bricks through its windows following negotiations between civil rights leaders and the city's business community.

=== Closure and redevelopment ===
After the department store closed, the building remained largely unused. Bayer Properties purchased the property in 2000 and subsequently pursued plans for its redevelopment.

In August 2010, the developer discussed a proposed $60 million conversion with city officials. The plans at that stage included retail, restaurants and offices, but the project did not immediately proceed.

A later redevelopment converted the former store into a mixed-use property. The approximately $70 million project was completed in December 2016, with the residential portion opening that month. The building held its formal grand opening on March 16, 2017.

The renovation received a regional award from Engineering News-Record in 2017 in the renovation and restoration category.

== Architecture ==
The original department store was an eight-story building faced with ivory-colored terracotta. Its first floor was designed with sufficient height to accommodate a mezzanine. The upper facade has groups of three windows separated by decorative panels, with Palladian-inspired details around the top-floor windows.

During the redevelopment, workers repaired the deteriorated terracotta facade while retaining much of the original flooring and interior wall structure. A large opening was cut through the upper floors to form a lightwell for the apartments. An old department store clock, discovered during the renovation, was restored and installed in the food hall.

The building is included in the Downtown Birmingham Retail and Theatre Historic District, listed on the National Register of Historic Places in 1989. It is also part of the Birmingham Civil Rights Historic District, which was listed in 2006.

== Commercial and residential uses ==
=== Food hall and shops ===
The Pizitz Food Hall occupies part of the building's lower levels. When the redevelopment formally opened in 2017, it contained 13 food stalls, two restaurants and a bar. Warby Parker and Birmingham-based Yellowhammer Creative were among the retail tenants.

Businesses operating in the food hall in 2019 included Alabama Biscuit Company, Eli's Jerusalem Grill, Ono Poke, Piper and Leaf Artisan Tea Company and The Standard. The Louis Bar was also located in the hall. The selection of food vendors changed over time.

The food hall also included REVeal Kitchen, a rotating restaurant incubator developed with REV Birmingham. The space gave emerging food businesses an opportunity to operate for several months before making way for another vendor. Previous occupants included Bitty's Living Kitchen and The Preservery.

=== Apartments, offices and cinema ===
The renovation created 143 apartments on the upper floors. Other parts of the building were adapted for retail, coworking and events. Forge occupied office space on the mezzanine, while The Gallery was used for private events. The property also included a courtyard and an attached seven-level parking garage.

In August 2019, the Sidewalk Film Center + Cinema was completed in the building's lower level. Designed by Davis Architects, the facility includes two approximately 100-seat screening rooms, a lounge and bar, offices and space for film education.

== Later developments ==
The property was placed on the market for sale in July 2022. The listing covered its 143 apartments and commercial spaces.

In September 2025, the Birmingham City Council approved a two-year extension of repayment terms on a $3.2 million loan used to help finance the redevelopment. Representatives of Bayer Properties cited reduced business at the food hall following the COVID-19 pandemic and the need for further investment in its commercial spaces.

== See also ==
- Pizitz
- National Register of Historic Places listings in Jefferson County, Alabama
