= The Shoppes at Bel Air =

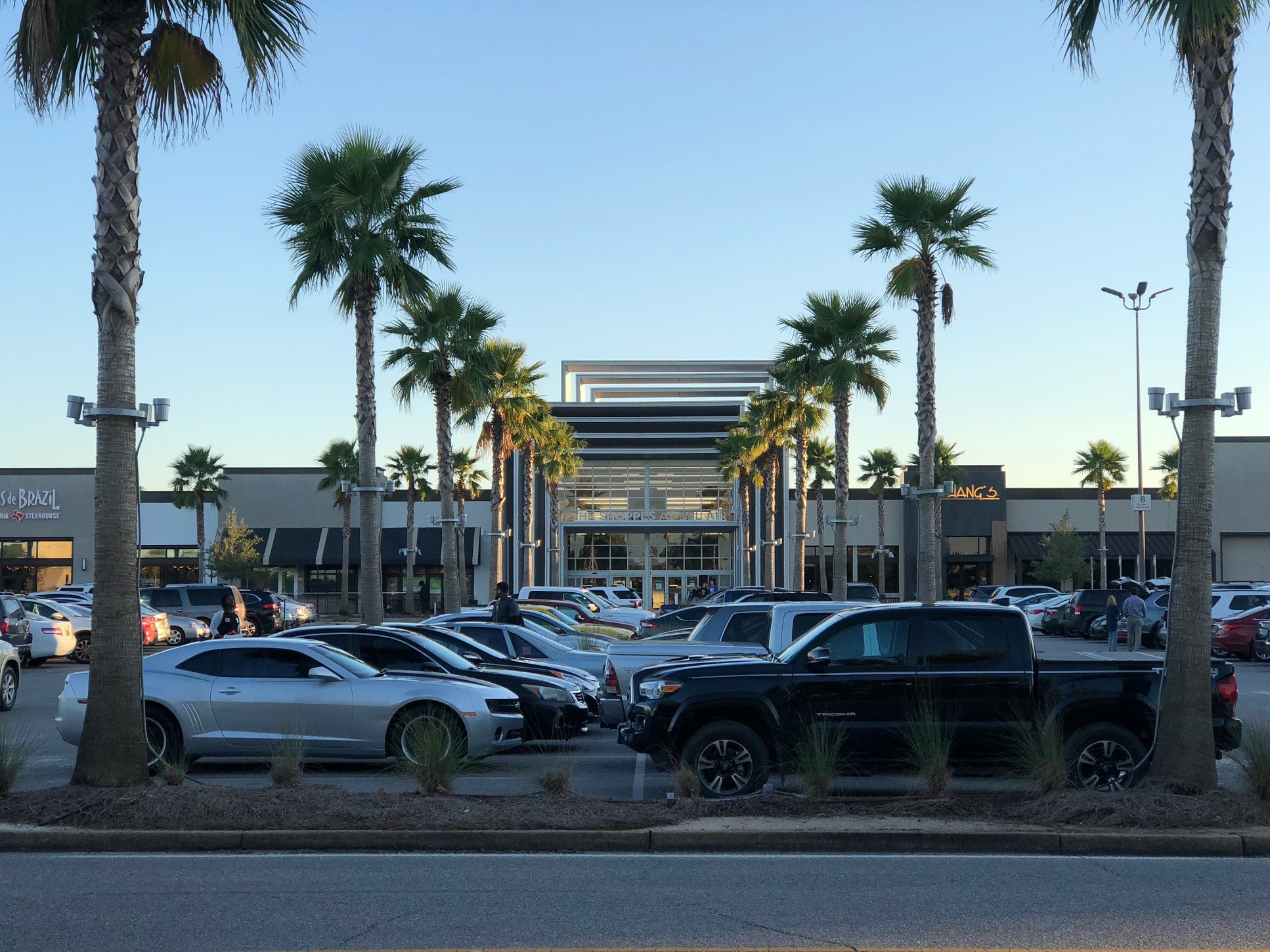
- Entrance to The Shoppes at Bel Air, 2018
- Location: Mobile, Alabama, United States
- Coordinates: 30°40′28.59″N 88°7′23.3″W
- Opened: August 16, 1967; 59 years ago
- Previous names: Bel Air Mall, Colonial Mall Bel Air, and Bel Air Mall
- Developer: Kenneth R. Giddens, William Lyon and Jay Altmayer
- Manager: 4th Dimension Properties
- Owner: 4th Dimension Properties
- Num. of stores: 130
- Num. of anchor tenants: 4 (1 Vacant)
- Floor area: 1,345,000 sq ft (125,000 m^{2})
- Floors: 1 (2 in Belk, Dillard's, and former JCPenney
- Website: https://www.shoppesatbelair.com/

The Shoppes at Bel Air is a super-regional shopping mall, located in Mobile, Alabama, United States. The mall has a gross leasable area of 1,345,000 sq ft (125,000 m^{2}). It is the oldest continuously operating enclosed super-regional mall in Alabama and serves as one of the primary retail venues for the west Mobile shopping district located at the vicinity of Airport Boulevard (Mobile County Highway 56) and Interstate 65. Currently, Belk, Dillard's, Surge Entertainment Center by Drew Brees, and Target serve as the mall's anchor stores. The mall also features more than 130 stores and restaurants; it has a vacant anchor that was once JCPenney.

== History ==
=== Planning, Construction, and Opening ===
More than ten years of research and planning took place before Bel Air Mall finally came to fruition in August 1967. Designed by the architecture firm of Herbert H. Johnson Associates of Washington, DC, the enclosed mall was developed by WKRG-TV founder Kenneth R. Giddens, William Lyon and Jay Altmayer as the centerpiece of an automobile-centric edge city known as Bel Air. In its original configuration, the mall consisted of a one-level 900-foot (270 m) long retail corridor of fifty in-line tenants anchored by Sears and local department store Hammel's. Over the years, the mall would be complemented by extensive commercial developments in the form of movie theaters, communal strip malls, office complexes and upscale apartment complexes in surrounding Bel Air development sites. It was originally decorated with nine Grecian statues that "originally stood at Versailles and were cast in the 1850s by order of Napoleon III." The mall took its name from its location at the intersection of Beltline Highway and Airport Boulevard.

=== 1970s ===
Hammel's would become D. H. Holmes in 1973. D. H. Holmes, a New Orleans–based department store, subsequently added a second level to the building and transformed it into a 200,000-square-foot (19,000 m^{2}) hub for its Gulf Coast operations. In 1974, a 191,000-square-foot (17,700 m^{2}) JCPenney store would serve as a two-level anchor for Bel Air Mall's new north–south enclosed mall corridor. With the completion of this mall expansion project, Bel Air Mall became Alabama's largest regional mall, a title it would retain until the 1986 debut of Riverchase Galleria in suburban Birmingham.

=== 1980s and 1990s ===
In February 1984, Parisian would serve as the 90,000-square-foot (8,400 m^{2}) anchor of a 122,000-square-foot (11,300 m^{2}) mall expansion just east of JCPenney. Sporting a modern interpretation of French Colonial architectural style, this expansion included a food court featuring a sunken seating area, landscaping and water features, a Ruby Tuesday casual dining restaurant and several new in-line retailers. Its exterior entrance would be marked with a two-level structure, although the second level was inaccessible and essentially functionless. In 1989 Arkansas-based Dillard's would enter the South Alabama market, with the acquisition of the D. H. Holmes chain.

Bel Air Mall began the 1990s with a $14 million overhaul which updated the mall's image. The signage was updated. The white modernist facades of the mall complex were enhanced with soft and warmer tones, the massive surface lots were extensively landscaped, and in the most noticeable design change, the two-tiered entrance structures which flanked the food court and main entrances were replaced with less dramatic canopied structures.

Bel Air Mall's most dramatic expansion and renovation of the decade would occur in 1996. In March of that year, discount retailer Target announced it would be locating its first South Alabama store at the mall. This served as the catalyst for a $40 million project that would see expansion and related renovation projects at the four other anchor stores. The food court and a couple of in-line merchants, including Bailey Banks and Biddle, were demolished for Target's 116,000-square-foot (10,800 m^{2}) debut. Sears would increase by 90,000 square feet (8,400 m^{2}), including a new 70,000-square-foot (6,500 m^{2}) second level and a more contemporary building facade. Parisian engulfed a mall corridor that previously connected the food court and the north–south mall in order to expand to 122,000 square feet (11,300 m^{2}). Dillard's undertook a substantial interior and exterior renovation, while JCPenney made storewide changes.

=== 2000s ===
The mall would become Colonial Mall Bel Air in the summer of 2000, following Colonial Properties acquisition of the mall in 1998. It would then revert to Bel Air Mall in 2007. Following the sale of 38 Parisian stores to Belk in August 2006, the Parisian store at Bel Air Mall was rebranded as a Belk store in September 2007.

In November 2008, fashion retailer Forever 21 opened a 26,000-square-foot (2,400 m^{2}) XXI Forever store in the former Woolworth's location. Most recently, that general retail space was home to several of Foot Locker's niche-oriented shoe store formats.

=== 2010s ===
Throughout the spring and summer of 2010, JCPenney underwent its most significant renovation in fourteen years. Brighter flooring and upgraded fixtures enhanced the store's new racetrack layout. The opening of a Sephora vendor shop on the first level, visible from the main mall entrance, was among the store's new additions.

In the spring of 2015, an ambitious renovation plan was announced for Bel Air Mall. Traveling from Airport Boulevard, a landscaped main boulevard will carry guests to the redesigned main entrance. Here, a towering new architectural structure has given that main mall entrance increased visibility from the north parking lot and as the anchor for the new exterior streetscape. Two new casual dining restaurants, P. F. Chang's and Grimaldi's Pizzeria have been developed on either side of this main entrance, forming a main entry plaza. Along with new native landscaping, seating areas and water features, this streetscape will be tenanted with upscale specialty stores and restaurants. The former Books-A-Million (which had closed Christmas Eve 2013), had been incorporated into the streetscape, providing additional retail space and a second, smaller entry corridor into the mall. At the other end of the original mall wing, adjacent to Dillard's, the long vacant Bel Air Cinema outparcel will be demolished for additional surface parking. The mall and its eventual streetscape were rechristened as The Shoppes at Bel Air in July 2015.

Sears closed its Bel Air location in September 2015, in order for Belk to begin construction on their $15 million flagship department store. The new 237,000 square foot Belk store had its soft opening in late September 2016.

In March 2016, it was announced that fast fashion retailer H&M would develop a 19,000 square foot store at Bel Air. The chain debuted as the mall's newest junior anchor in July 2016.

P. F. Chang's opened along the streetscape at the main entrance on February 13, 2017. Grimaldi's Pizzeria (now closed) opened on February 20, 2017, on the opposite side of the main entrance.

In April 2018, it was announced that upscale Brazilian steakhouse chain, Texas de Brazil, would be opening on the streetscape near the main entrance. The churrascaria opened in August 2018.

=== 2020s ===
Both P. F. Chang's and Texas de Brazil closed due to the mall being sold to Kohan Retail Investment Group in late 2020.

In February 2023, it was announced that Drew Brees-owned Surge Entertainment Center would be opening its fourth entertainment center location on the former Parisian/Belk anchor while the entire corridor that connected from Target to JCPenney will be renovated for extra space. The venue opened on June 15, 2023, completely isolating Target from the rest of the mall.

In May 2023, Kohan Retail Investment Group was nearly $700,000 behind on taxes for The Shoppes at Bel Air, causing Kohan to lose the property. Because of this, 4th Dimension Properties assumed management of the mall, and had later acquired the property for an unknown price, causing 4th Dimension to be the new owner and manager of Bel Air.

On June 7, 2024, it was announced that JCPenney would be closing. It closed on September 22, 2024.

In August 2024, 4th Dimension had announced that 6 new businesses are coming soon to the property, addressing the former P.F. Chang’s, Texas De Brazil, Grimaldi’s Pizzeria, among others, on both of Bel Air’s restaurant row, as well as new businesses in the interior of the mall, as well as addressing Bel Air’s former Forever 21. All of this caused occupancy rates and foot traffic to bounce back up for the mall.

In March 2026, Target announced that it would renovate its Bel Air location and is expected to take about four to five months to complete.

== See also ==
- Cordova Mall
- Pelican Place at Craft Farms
- Springdale Mall
- Eastern Shore Centre
