= Pelican Place at Craft Farms =

- Location: Gulf Shores, Alabama, United States
- Coordinates: 30°17′56″N 87°40′52″W
- Address: 3800 Gulf Shores Parkway
- Opened: 2008
- Manager: RCG Ventures
- Owner: RCG Ventures
- Architect: CMH Architects
- Num. of anchor tenants: 6
- Floor area: 372,000 square feet (35,000 m^{2})
- Website: pelicanplacegulfshores.com

Pelican Place at Craft Farms is a 372,000-square-foot (34,600 m^{2}) lifestyle center in Gulf Shores, Alabama. It is planned to expand to 650,000 square feet (60,000 m^{2}). It was designed by CMH Architects of Birmingham, the firm that also designed the Eastern Shore Centre in nearby Spanish Fort. It was developed by Colonial Properties as part of their "Pinnacle" brand of lifestyle centers and was originally known as the Pinnacle at Craft Farms. In September 2015, Langley Properties, the development's most recent management company, sold Pelican Place to RCG Ventures of Atlanta, Georgia, for more than $18 million.

The city of Gulf Shores paid approximately $10M to local landowner and future city mayor Robert Craft to acquire the first 44 acres of land for Pinnacle at Craft Farms project in 2004. The city would lease the acreage back to Colonial Properties Trust if they successfully developed an upscale open air mall two years after the sale. The lease would last for 30 years. Colonial would pay $10,000 per year after the city’s debt was paid. A clause in the bond deal between Gulf Shores and Colonial Properties allowed city officials to approve of the stores that Colonial was pursuing for the open air mall’s small shop spaces. In the agreement, Colonial was bound to lease space to a music store, book store and other specialty stores and upscale restaurants. The developer initially sought retailers such as Ann Taylor LOFT, American Eagle Outfitters, Coldwater Creek, and Swim & Sport as tenants. It was essential for Colonial to secure a lease with Target as an anchor.In June 2007, Colonial Properties would enter in a joint venture with Kentucky-based Langley Properties Company. This allowed Langley to pursue financial incentives available through the GO Zone Act of 2005.

Pelican Place has three anchors. These include a 60,000-square-foot (5,600 m^{2}) fourteen screen Cobb Theatres multiplex, a 15,676-square-foot (1,456.3 m^{2}) Books-A-Million, and 25,344-square-foot (2,354.5 m^{2}) Bed Bath & Beyond. In August 2024, the vacant Bed Bath & Beyond was replaced by Bealls Home Centric home furnishings store. A 90-room Courtyard by Marriott hotel, and a 45,000-square-foot (4,200 m^{2}) Publix supermarket are immediately south of Pelican Place. The main in-line tenant buildings of the shopping center are oriented along a linear street-scape, which is then intersected to the east by a pedestrian oriented restaurant plaza and splash fountain. Pelican Place was developed as a retail and entertainment component of the Craft Farms golf community, from which it is separated via a landscaped man-made retention pond. It is the primary retail component of the 150-acre (61 ha) master-planned community.

== See also ==
- Bel Air Mall
- Cordova Mall
- Eastern Shore Centre
