= University Town Plaza =

- Location: Pensacola, Florida, U.S.
- Coordinates: 30.4986°N 87.2251°W
- Address: 7171 North Davis Highway
- Opened: 1974
- Closed: 2013 (original indoor mall)
- Developer: Cousins Properties
- Owner: Washington Prime Group
- Num. of anchor tenants: 5
- Floor area: 747,000 square feet (69,400 m^{2}) (original mall)
- Floors: 1

University Town Plaza is an outdoor shopping mall in Pensacola, Florida, United States. It is being developed on the site of the former University Mall, which operated from 1974 to 2013. The mall's original anchor stores were J. C. Penney, Sears, and McRae's. In 2013, the mall was torn down except for its anchor stores and rebuilt as an outdoor complex. Anchor stores of the outdoor complex are J. C. Penney, Burlington, BJ's Wholesale Club, Conn's and Academy Sports + Outdoors. The mall is owned and managed by Washington Prime.

== History ==
University Mall opened in 1974 with J. C. Penney, Sears-closed in July 2018, and McRae's, in its first location outside Mississippi. The mall was largely damaged by Hurricane Ivan in 2004, but all three anchor stores soon reopened. Plans were first announced in 2007 to redevelop the mall, which had been losing stores, but retain all three anchors.

Belk, which bought the McRae's chain, closed its store at the mall in 2011 and consolidated into a newly relocated store at Cordova Mall. In 2013, Simon began demolition of the mall property, and announced the newly redeveloped mall would include Academy Sports + Outdoors, Burlington Coat Factory, and Toys "R" Us, which closed in June 2018. The first phase of renovation would also include a new series of inline shops including Famous Footwear, Motherhood Maternity, and a Jimmy John's restaurant. J. C. Penney has remained operational at the mall.

In 2015, Sears Holdings spun off 235 of its properties, including the Sears at University Town Plaza, into Seritage Growth Properties. The former Sears was torn down in 2019 for a BJ's Wholesale Club.

Conn's would open in the former Toys "R" Us in 2022.
