= Premiere Cinemas =

American movie theater chain

Premiere Cinema Corp.
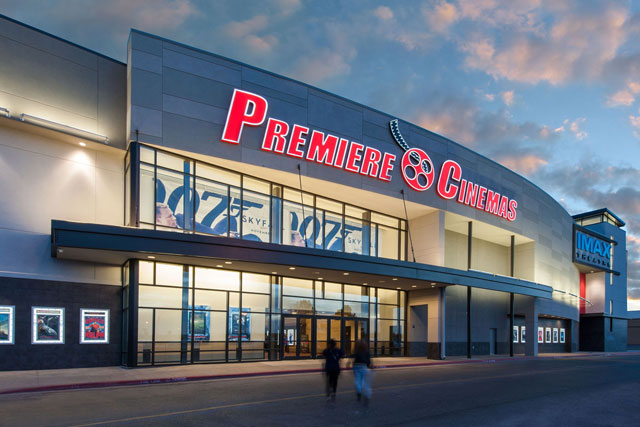
- Premiere Cinemas in Lubbock, Texas
- Trade name: Premiere Cinemas
- Type: Private
- Industry: Entertainment (movie theaters)
- Founded: 1985; 41 years ago
- Founder: Gary Moore
- Headquarters: Big Spring, Texas, U.S.
- Number of locations: 22
- Key people: Gary Moore (CEO)
- Revenue: US$97 million (2023)
- Owner: Gary Moore
- Number of employees: 1,700 (2023)
- Website: www.pccmovies.com

Premiere Cinemas is a privately held motion picture exhibitor headquartered in Big Spring, Texas. It is among the largest independently owned motion picture exhibitors in the U.S. and is ranked by Box Office magazine and the Cinema United Encyclopedia of Exhibition among the top 12 circuits in the U.S.

== History ==
Premiere was founded by Gary Moore, who bought his first theater in 1985 and later incorporated Premiere in 1993.

== Digital projection conversion ==
In 2008 Premiere Cinemas became one of the first cinema companies in the U.S. to begin the process of converting all of its 35mm film cinemas to all-digital projection. The company used digital projection technology pioneered by Texas Instruments through the invention of the DLP chip, and manufactured by Belgium-based Barco (Belgium-American Radio Company).

In 2018, opening the Biloxi Premiere LUX Ciné, Premiere unveiled its first use of NEC Laser projection, Making it the first location in the state of Mississippi to include full laser projection on all screens.

== New Horizons ==
Premiere received further notoriety as being the first company to successfully design, build and operate mezzanine-less multiplexes without traditional projection booths, incorporating the digital projectors directly into the theatre's architecture. Premiere accomplishes this by means of what it calls Digital Command Centers, typically glass-enclosed rooms off the theatre's lobbies displaying racks of digital terabyte GDC or Do-Re-Mi servers, processors, and monitors in public view. Motion picture content is delivered to Premiere Cinemas on hard drives or via satellite and stored on its library management servers where it is managed and transmitted to the auditoriums throughout the complex.

In 2017, Premiere Cinemas opened its first LUX Ciné and Pizza Pub concept in Grand Prairie, TX outside of Dallas. Premiere's LUX Ciné locations include state of the art luxury lounge recliners. These recliners feature reclining foot and head rests, customized head support and USB charger ports in each chair. LUX concession stands include bottled and draft beers and both self serve popcorn machines and self serve state of the art touch screen soda fountains. At locations featuring the Pizza Pub concept, guests can order their appetizers, pizzas and desserts at the concession stand or bar and meet food at their auditorium door when it is ready. The second Premiere LUX Ciné and Pizza Pub opened November 30, 2018 in Biloxi, MS at the Edgewater Mall.

During 2017, Premiere also began the process of retrofitting its theatres to lux recliner seating, replacing traditional rocking chairs with electric recliners. Concession retrofits were also complete making these four locations complete Premiere LUX Ciné concepts.

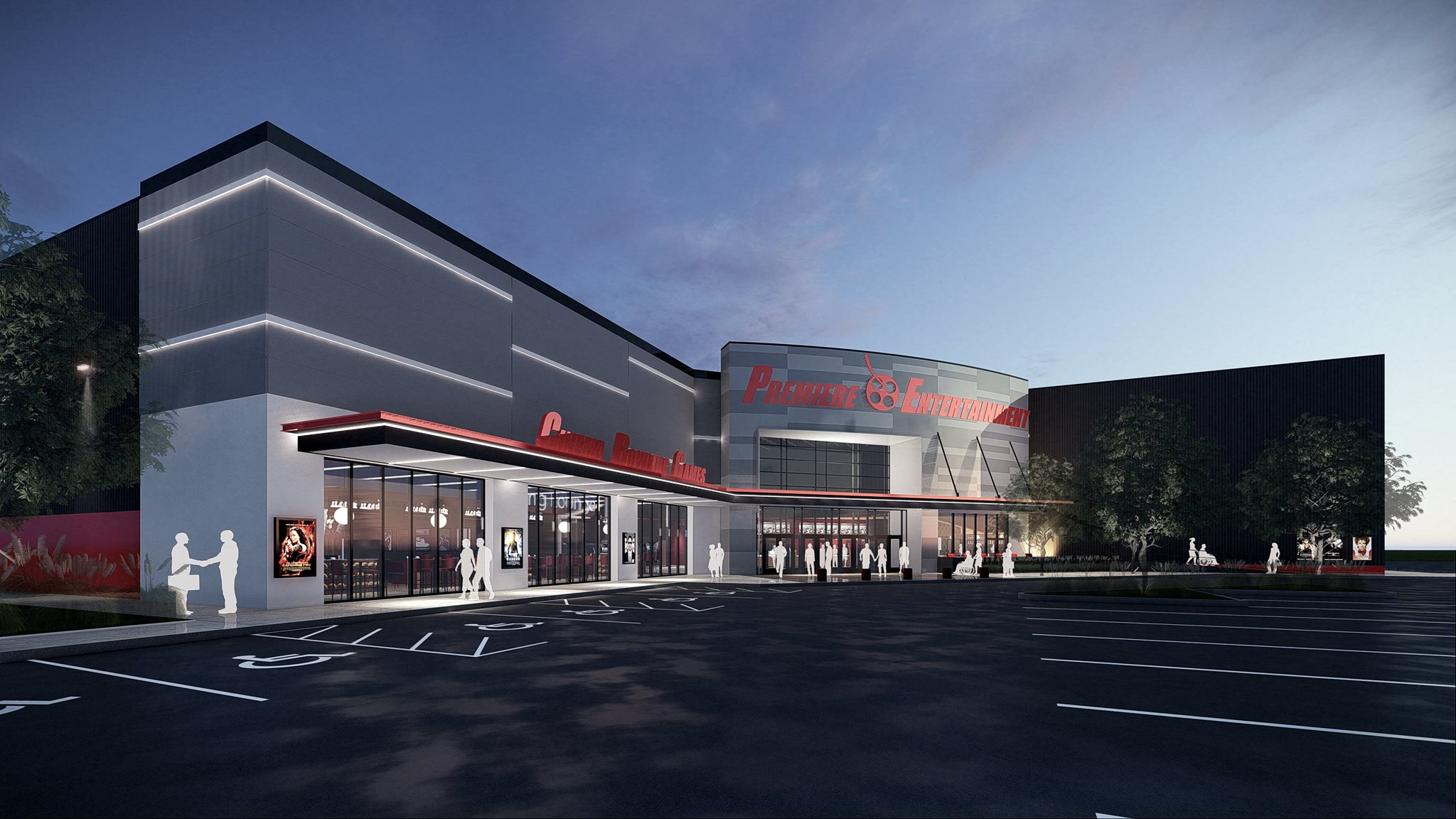
Pell City Premiere Cinertainment

In 2019 Premiere opened a Cinertainment concept in Pell City, AL featuring Pizza Pub, bowling, redemption arcade, and ropes course along with its multi-screen recliner cinemas.

== D-BOX motion technology ==
Premiere Cinemas partners with Quebec-based D-BOX Technologies, Inc. to bring D-BOX motion technology, programmed motion effects synchronized with the film to a platform or the seat.

== IMAX ==
Premiere opened four IMAX screens under agreements with Toronto-based IMAX Corporation in Lubbock, El Paso, Temple and Bryan.

== Locations ==
As of 2020 Premiere owned 250 screens in 22 locations in six U.S. states: Texas, New Mexico, Alabama, Florida, South Carolina and Mississippi. Megaplex Premiere Cinema locations are operated in Lubbock, Bryan-College Station, Burleson, Abilene, Grand Prairie, Temple, El Paso, Spanish Fort, Bessemer, Gadsden, Pell City, Alabama, and Rio Rancho, New Mexico, and Biloxi, Mississippi . The Premiere in Rio Rancho was honored in 2012 by the New Mexico NOIAP as Outstanding Retail Development of the Year for the state. The City of Rio Rancho honored Premiere by naming a street after the company, Premiere Parkway.
