= Selma Mall =

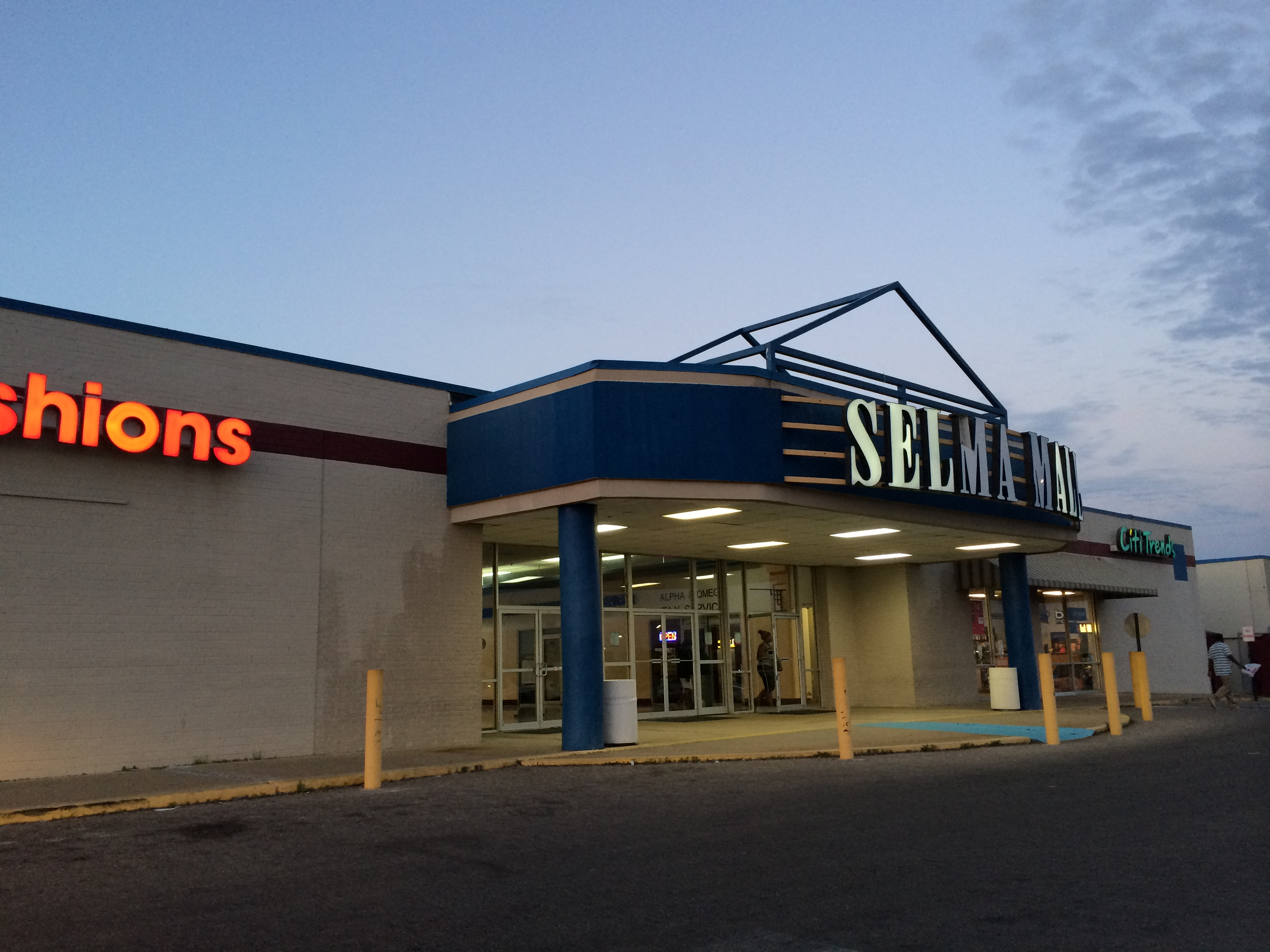
- Entrance to Selma Mall, March 2014
- Location: Selma, Alabama, United States
- Coordinates: 32°25′58.88″N 87°0′55.63″W
- Opened: 1971
- Developer: Aronov Realty
- Manager: Aronov Realty
- Num. of stores: 2
- Num. of anchor tenants: 3 (1 open, 2 vacant)
- Floor area: 330,617 square feet (30,715.3 m^{2})
- Floors: 1

Selma Mall is an enclosed shopping mall located in Selma, Alabama. The mall opened in 1971 with Sears, Britt's (a division of J.J. Newberry) and S.H. Kress as its major stores. By the 1990s, Kress had become McCrory Stores, and Beall-Ladymon had joined as a central anchor. The anchor store is Treasure Box Flea and Antique Mall.

Sears closed in 1993 and became McRae's (now part of Belk) three years later. Goody's, which replaced the former Beall-Ladymon, reopened in 2011 after closing in 2008. Steele's was added in 2011 as another anchor. In January 2014, JCPenney announced the pending closure of its Selma Mall store. In August 2019, Treasure Box Flea and Antique Mall was opened in former JCPenney space. On May 23, 2023, it was announced that Belk would close on June 5, leaving Treasure Box Flea and Antique Mall as the only anchor left.
