= Malbis Memorial Church =

- Sacred Patriarchal and Stavropegial Monastery of the Presentation of Theotokos
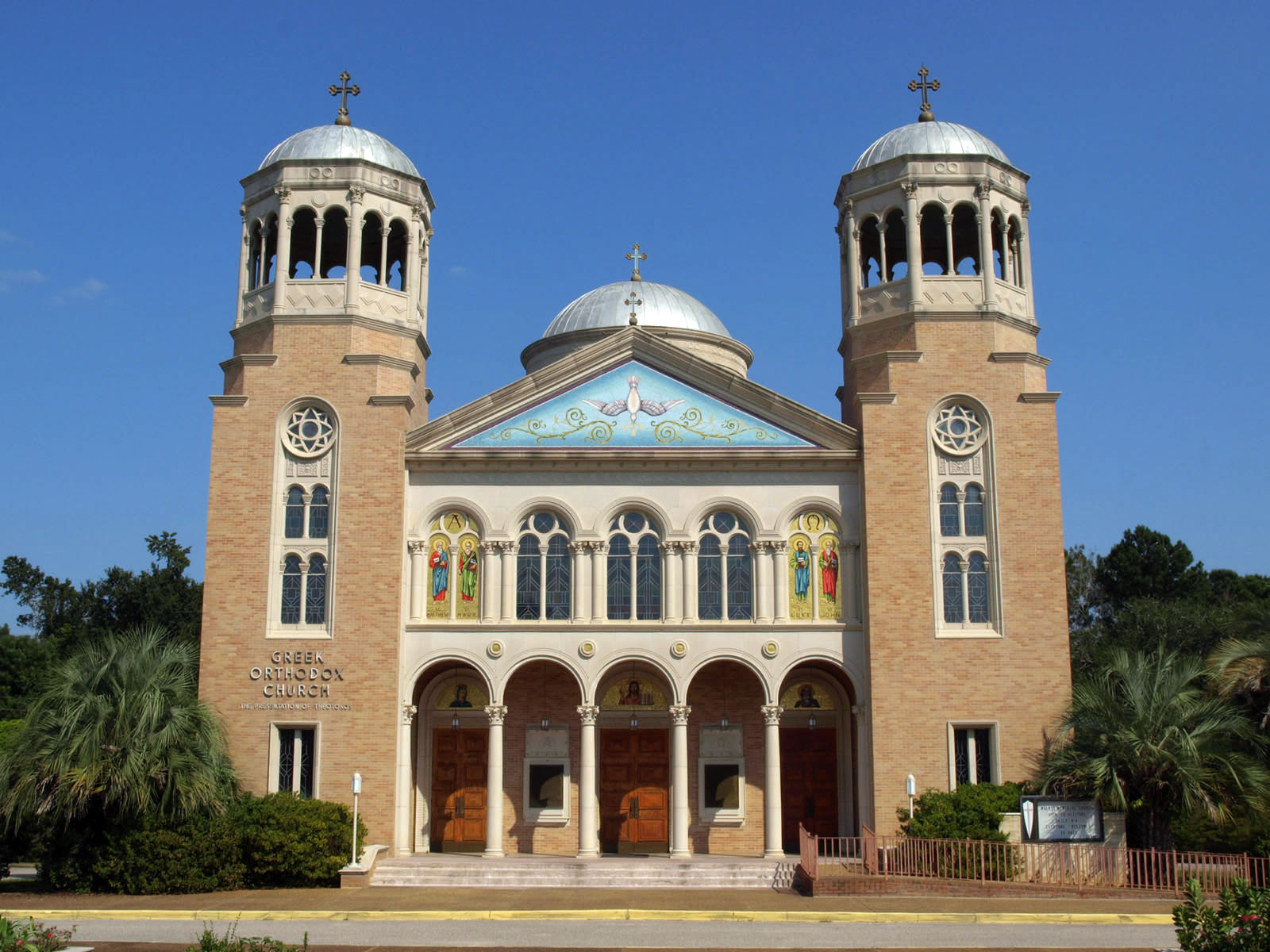
- Malbis Memorial Church
- 30°39′7″N 87°51′4″W
- Location: Malbis, Alabama
- Country: United States
- Denomination: Greek Orthodox

History
- Dedication: Presentation of the Theotokos
- Dedicated: January 3, 1965

Architecture
- Architect: Frederick C. Woods
- Style: Byzantine Revival

Specifications
- Materials: Brick, Limestone, Marble

Alabama Register of Landmarks and Heritage
- Designated: November 30, 1977

Malbis Memorial Church, formally the Sacred Patriarchal and Stavropegial Monastery of the Presentation of Theotokos, is a Greek Orthodox Church located in Malbis, Baldwin County, Alabama. One of roughly six Greek Orthodox churches in the state of Alabama, it is not a part of the Greek Orthodox Archdiocese of America, but is instead directly under the authority of the Patriarchate of Constantinople. It is known for its intricate and extensive mosaics and paintings. The church was officially dedicated on January 3, 1965, and the opening service for the church was conducted by Archbishop Iakovos of America. It has never had an active congregation, but religious observances, special services, and events, such as weddings, do take place. It was listed on the Alabama Register of Landmarks and Heritage on November 30, 1977. The Malbis Plantation Historic District, which includes the church, was designated by the Alabama Historical Commission in 2008, a year that also saw the death of the last of Malbis Plantation's original Greek settlers.

== History ==
The history of the church at Malbis begins with the foundation of Malbis Plantation by Jason Malbis, a Greek immigrant. Born Antonios Markopoulos in the settlement of Doumena, he spent the first half of his life in a monastery. He initially emigrated to Chicago around 1900. He changed his name to Malbis while there and then, along with one of his friends, William Papageorge, he traveled around the country in search of a place to establish a Greek community. They purchased 120 acres (49 ha) near Daphne, Alabama in 1906 at $5 per acre. This formed the nucleus of Malbis Plantation.

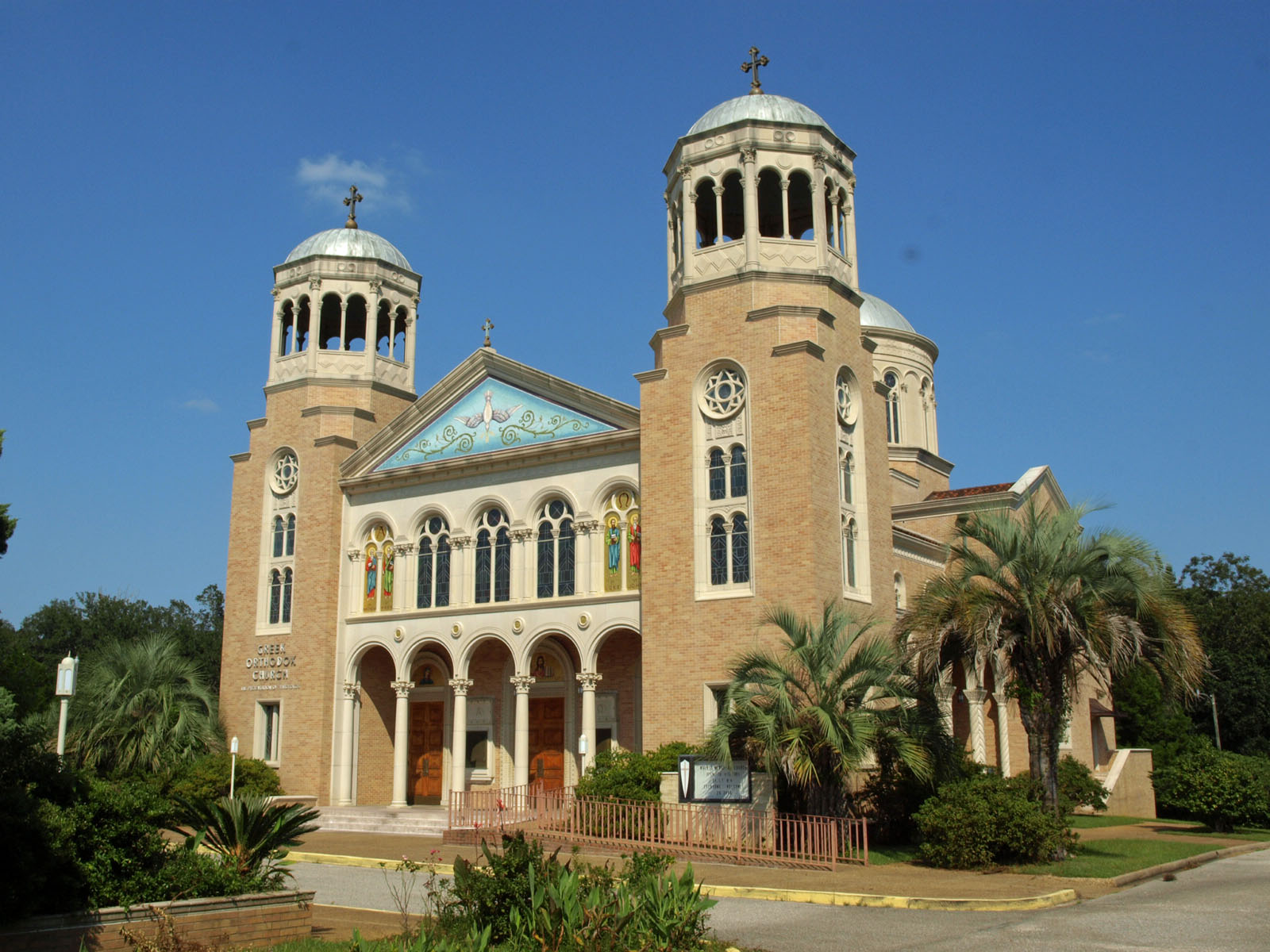
View of the front (west) and south sides in 2012.

Other Greek families then joined the monk and Papageorge and began building the plantation in the thickly wooded and unsettled area, with an additional 600 acres (240 ha) purchased in 1909. The population had grown to 85 by 1920. The group was self-sufficient, farming the land. They eventually had their own power plant, dairy, cannery, bank, garage, nursery, timber company, motel, a bakery in nearby Mobile, and more than 10,000 acres (4,000 ha) of property.

Malbis died while on a trip to Greece in 1942. He had left written instructions for his survivors to "build a Greek Orthodox church for me in Malbis." The community accomplished this in 1965, with the construction of the church financed through the sale of the plantation's bakery on Broad Street in Mobile by the Malbis Plantation president of that era, Sam George Papas. The remains of Jason Malbis were then interred in a crypt within the church, to the right of the iconostasis.

== Architecture ==
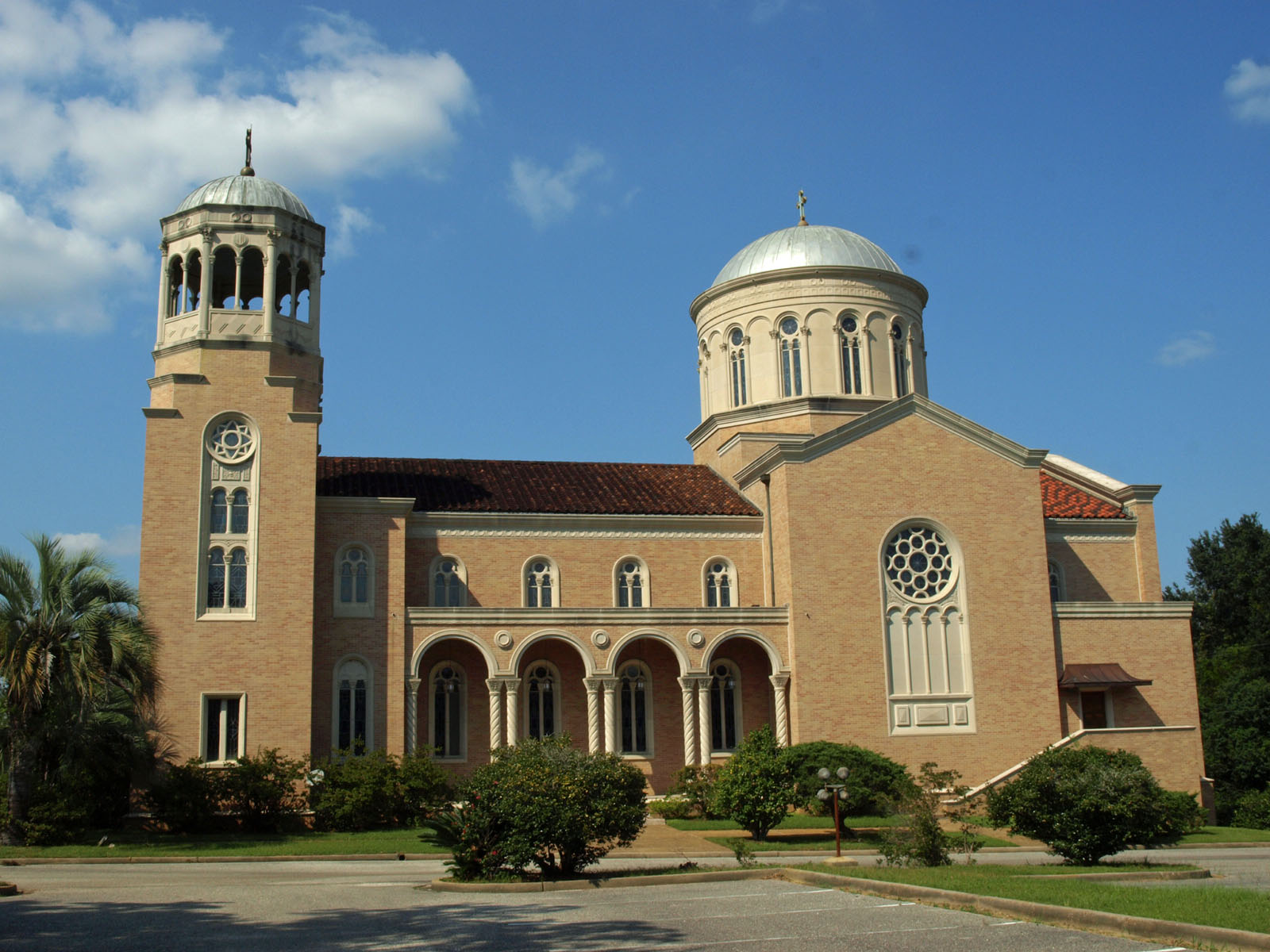
View from the south

The Byzantine Revival church was designed by the architectural firm of Frederick C. Woods and Associates in Mobile. Built of brick, limestone, and marble, its plan was inspired by the Church of Ayia Paraskevi in Athens. The structure is cruciform in plan. Domed towers flank the western entrance facade, which features a stone arcade. This porch contains three sets of entrance doors topped by arched mosaics of Theotokos (Mary), Jesus, and Saint Paul. The arcade is surmounted by arched windows and mosaic panels depicting Saints John, Luke, Mark, and Matthew. This is crowned by a pediment covered in a mosaic depicting the Dove of Peace. All exterior mosaics were created by Italian artist Sirio Tonelli. They were executed in Tonelli's workshop in Pietrasanta and then shipped to Malbis for installation.

Almost every available surface in the interior of the church is covered with hand-painted iconography. This work was done by a Greek iconographer, Spyros Tziouvaras, and two assistants, Haralambos Tziouvaras and Chris Tziouvaras. The dome above the transept is notable for a painting of the Pantocrator (The Almighty), which was painted by the Tziouvaras team while lying on a scaffold 75 feet (23 m) from the floor. The nave is supported by Corinthian columns and pilasters of red marble. The iconostasis, bishop's throne, and pulpit are carved white Pentelic marble.

In 1979, Hurricane Frederic damaged much of the elaborate interior iconography, especially that in the dome. After a series of failed restorations, Mobile-area artist David Riall was hired to restore the church, using research and experimentation to indistinguishably match the Tziouvarases' original work.
