= Raw Justice =

1994 film by David A. Prior

- DVD cover
- Directed by: David A. Prior
- Written by: David A. Prior
- Produced by: David Winters
- Starring: David Keith; Robert Hays; Pamela Anderson; Stacy Keach
- Cinematography: Carlos González
- Edited by: Tony Malanowski
- Music by: Lennie Moore; William T. Stromberg
- Production company: West Side Studios
- Distributed by: Republic Pictures Home Video (US VHS release)
- Release date: August 24, 1994
- Running time: 95 minutes
- Country: United States
- Language: English

Raw Justice (also known as Good Cop, Bad Cop or Strip Girl) is a 1994 American action thriller film starring Stacy Keach, David Keith, Robert Hays and Pamela Anderson.

== Plot ==
New Orleans journalist Donna Stiles (April Bogenschutz) is in her home, preparing to take a shower, when a man sneaks into her home and kills her.

Donna's father, mayor David Stiles (Charles Napier), calls on Donna's former fiancée, cop-turned-bounty hunter Mace (David Keith), to stop chasing bail-jumpers and bring in the killer. Mitch McCallum (Robert Hays), who once dated Donna with disastrous results and is now accused of the murder, insists that he is innocent.

Mace has an uneasy relationship with the regular police force, especially Detective Atkins (Leo Rossi). Mace tackles his mission wholeheartedly until Mitch is nearly killed by a bomb planted in his home. Mace and Mitch are ambushed and pursued; they barely escape, accompanied by Sarah (Pamela Anderson), a hooker who witnessed the attacks and must go into hiding with Mace and Mitch.

Mace threatens Bernie (Bernard Hocke), a bail bondsman, with a baseball bat to find out who posted Mitch's bond and wanted him killed out on the street. After Mace leaves Bernie's office, Atkins uses the same bat to beat Bernie to death, setting Mace up to be blamed for Bernie's death.

Later, Mitch saves Mace from a gunman in his hotel room. Mace figures out that Mitch has been framed by Deputy Mayor Bob Jenkins (Stacy Keach). Because Jenkins is tired of playing second fiddle to Mayor Stiles, he had Donna killed so he could steal a disc from her computer, fill it with false accusations of incest, and then use the disc to blackmail Mayor Stiles into refusing to run for office again.

Jenkins admits to Mayor Stiles that Jenkins is the mastermind behind Donna's murder as Atkins pursues Mace, Mitch and Sarah across the bayou. He finally corners them in a clip joint, where Mace uses a giant dart to kill Atkins. Jenkins takes Stiles hostage and demands safe passage out of the city.

Jenkins shoots Mayor Stiles in the shoulder, and a helicopter arrives for Jenkins, who releases Mayor Stiles and gets on the helicopter. Disguising himself as Jenkins's pilot, Mace jumps to safety just before the helicopter slams into a skyscraper, causing an explosion that kills Jenkins.

== Primary cast ==
- David Keith as Mace
- Robert Hays as Mitch McCallum
- Pamela Anderson as Sarah
- Leo Rossi as Detective David Atkins
- Charles Napier as Mayor David Stiles
- Stacy Keach as Deputy Mayor Bob Jenkins
- Javi Mulero as Detective Gordo Garcia
- Bernard Hocke as Bernie
- April Bogenschutz as Donna Stiles
- Marshall Russell as Sonny
- Jeanette Kontomitras as Blaze
- Larry McKinley as Desk Sergeant
- Hal Jeansonne as Bartender Joe
- David Veca as Thug #1

== Production ==
Parts of the movie were filmed in Mobile, Alabama, including the motorcycle chase between Mace and McCallum through Springdale Mall, which has since been mostly demolished or shuttered.

Pamela Anderson would later describe her simulated sex scenes as a "horrible experience." She later testified, "I was thrown around, I was scratched, I was bruised, I was bitten. I cried, I went home, I called my mother." Her experiences caused her to pull out of another film, Hello, She Lied, with her part going to Kathy Ireland.

== Reception ==
Raw Justice received the Bronze Award for Theatrical Feature Film - Dramatic at the 1993 WorldFest Charleston, under the title Good Cop, Bad Cop.

Writing for Entertainment Weekly, critic Glenn Kenny described the film as "a mildly diverting item wherein Baywatch's Pamela Anderson throws caution and undergarments to the wind. Otherwise, this murder mystery is trash that knows its name, and goes about its exploitative work with breezy good humor.
