= Pizitz =

Former Alabama department store chain

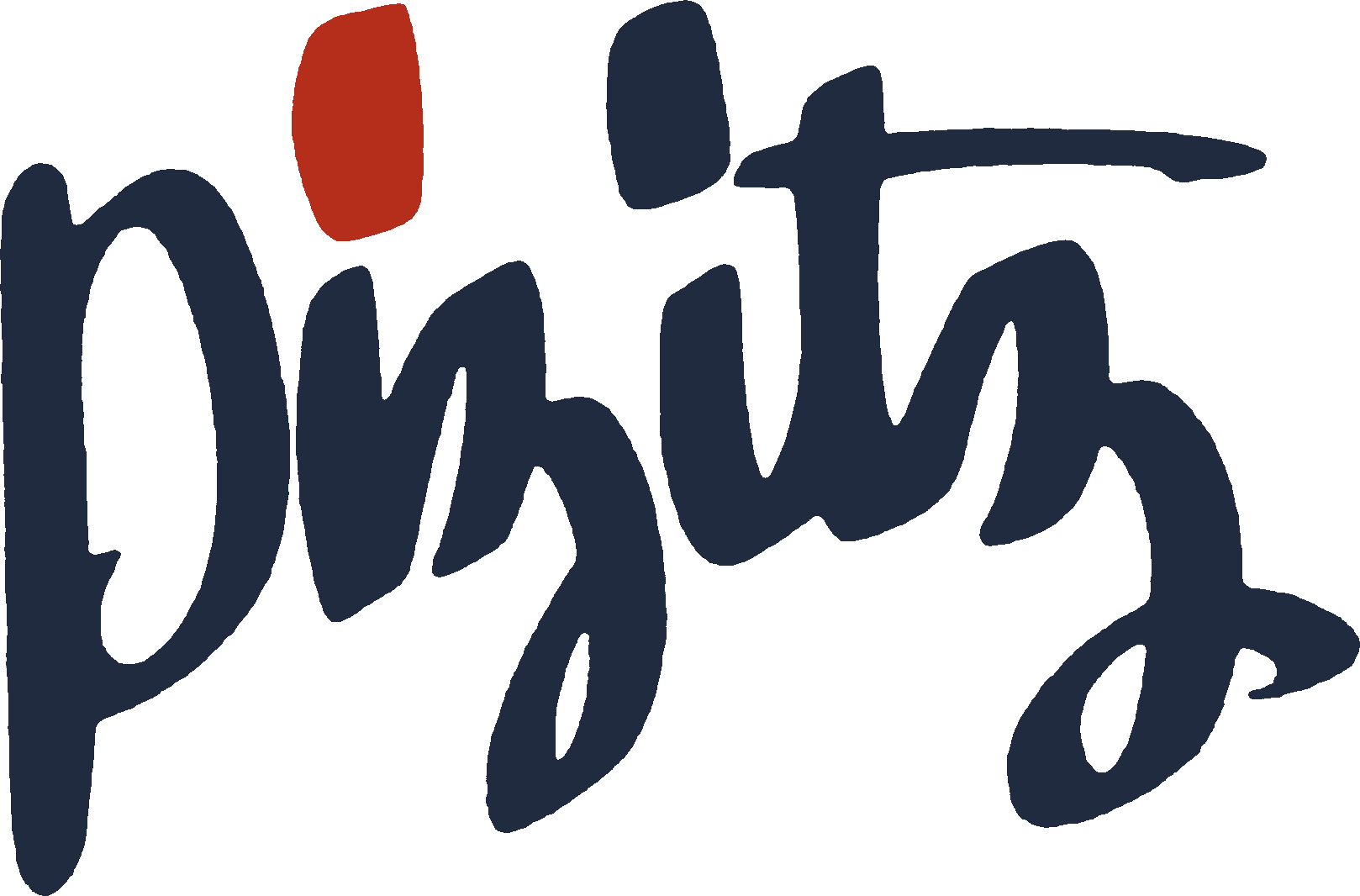
- Type: Department store
- Industry: Retail
- Founded: 1899 Birmingham, Alabama
- Defunct: December, 1986
- Fate: Sold to McRae's
- Headquarters: Birmingham, Alabama
- Products: Clothing, footwear, bedding, furniture, jewelry, beauty products, and housewares.
- Website: None

Pizitz was a major regional department store chain in Alabama, with its flagship store in downtown Birmingham. At its peak it operated 12 other stores, mostly in the Birmingham area with several locations in Huntsville and other Alabama cities.

The chain was founded as the Louis Pizitz Dry Goods Co. in 1899 on the site of its flagship building in downtown Birmingham. It was sold to McRae's in December 1986, and all former Pizitz stores became McRae's. Many of the former Pizitz locations are now closed, but the Pizitz family (via Pizitz Management Group) still owns the buildings of most of its former stores. This became an issue when the McRae's chain was sold to Belk Department Stores of Charlotte, North Carolina in 2005. Louis Pizitz Middle School is built on land donated by the Pizitz family.
