= The Mall at Westlake =

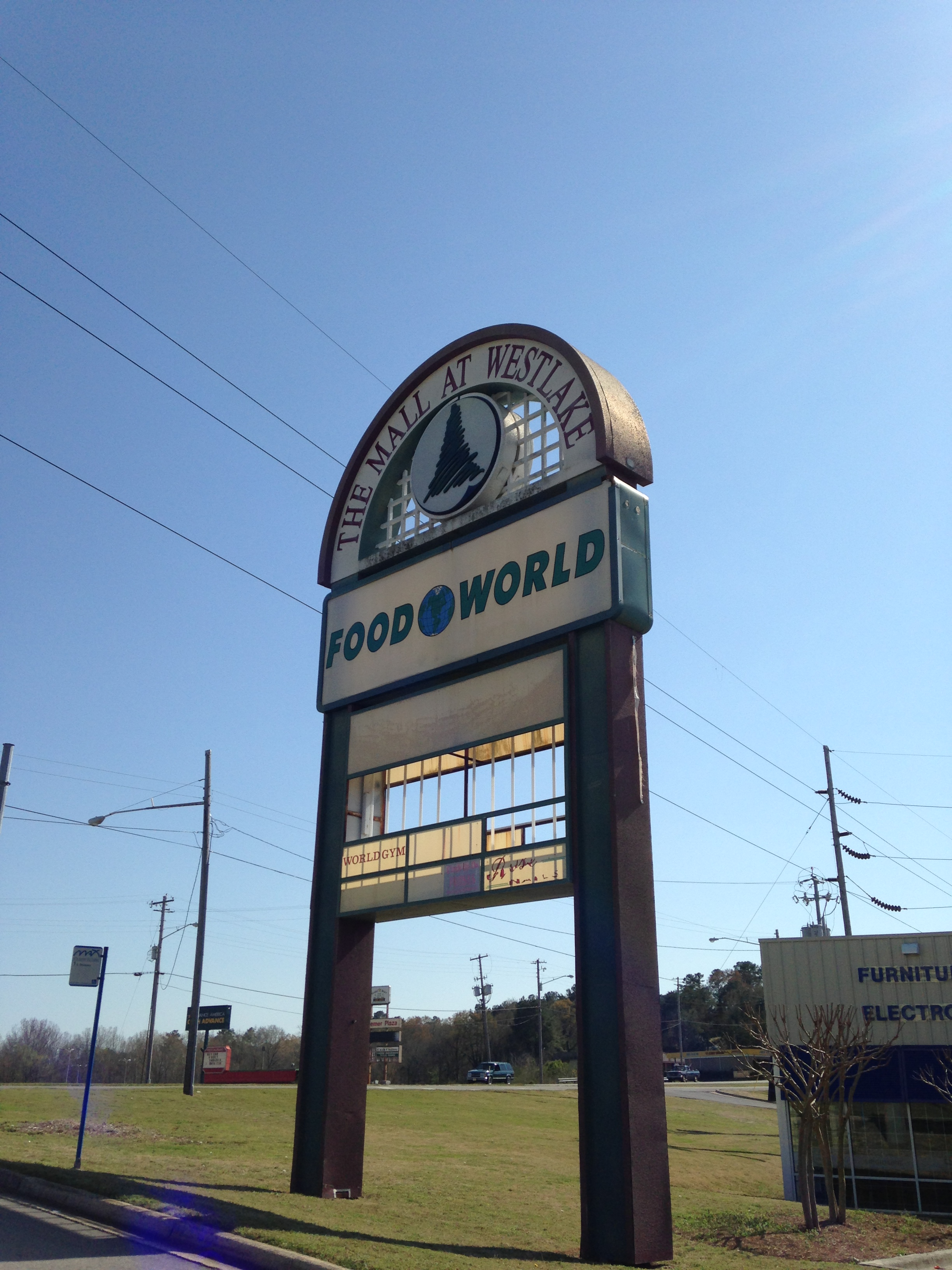
- Location: Bessemer, Alabama
- Coordinates: 33.3952°N 86.9725°W
- Opened: 1969
- Closed: 2009
- Owner: Anthony Underwood
- Num. of anchor tenants: 3
- Floor area: 300,000 square feet (28,000 m^{2})
- Floors: 1

The Mall at Westlake, typically referred to as Westlake Mall, was an enclosed shopping mall in Bessemer, Alabama.

== History ==
Westlake Mall was built on a former lake bed, along US Highway 11. The mall opened in 1969 with three anchors, Sears, Grant's, and Loveman's.

In 1970, former Governor George Wallace held a campaign event for re-election at the mall that was estimated to be attended by 10,000 people, one of the biggest turnouts during his last gubernatorial race.

In the late 1970s and 1980s, the mall saw decline. In November 1983, an 18 year old female was raped after being kidnapped near the mall by masked abductors. All three original anchors closed by 1989, making it a dead mall or deserted mall. Continuing urban sprawl southwestward toward the Tuscaloosa County line and increased crime and poverty in the city of Bessemer all contributed to the mall's demise.

During the mid 1980s, there was an effort to turn the mall into a factory outlet center, though many regular stores were still open.

In 1994, Bruno's Supermarkets opened a flagship store in the former Sears anchor location. It was the company's largest store. The mall continued to operate with a small assortment of stores, including a Goody's Family Clothing store in the former Loveman's anchor location.

The Goody's store relocated elsewhere in the late 2000s, and Bruno's filed bankruptcy in 2009, closing its store at the mall. The shuttered center was sold to Bessemer used-car dealership owner Anthony Underwood, who hoped to revive the center once again as an outlet mall.

In 2025, it was announced that the mall, vacant for 16 years, would be redeveloped as Marvel City Business Park, an industrial park.
