= Eastern Shore Centre =

- Class A Office Space is located above the Barnes & Noble junior anchor building
- Location: Spanish Fort, Alabama
- Coordinates: 30°40′9.59″N 87°50′57.16″W
- Opened: November 17, 2004
- Developer: The Trotman Company, Inc.
- Manager: Crawford Square Real Estate Advisors
- Owner: Wicker Park Capital Management
- Num. of stores: 70
- Num. of anchor tenants: 2
- Floor area: 540,000 square feet (50,000 m^{2})
- Floors: 1
- Website: www.easternshorecentre.com

Eastern Shore Centre is a 540,000-square-foot (50,000 m^{2}) mall located at the intersection of Malbis Parkway (Alabama State Route 181) and Interstate 10 in Spanish Fort, Alabama, United States, a suburb of Mobile. A landscaped perimeter road, Eastern Shore Boulevard, connects the lifestyle and power center components of this hybrid regional center. An apartment community, The Arlington at Eastern Shore Centre, was developed in the northeastern section of the complex.

== History ==
Developed by The Trotman Company, Inc. and designed by CMH Architects of Birmingham, it opened on November 17, 2004. It is anchored by the Dillard's and Belk department stores, while the bookstore Barnes & Noble and the regional footwear retailer Shoe Station are additional junior anchors. In-line merchants include Build-A-Bear Workshop, Ann Taylor LOFT, and Kirkland's Home. As of Fall 2024, Eastern Shore Centre was under the ownership of Wicker Park Capital Management while Crawford Square Real Estate Advisors are handling the leasing.

Development of Eastern Shore Centre would commence under the auspices of The Trotman Company, Inc., The Herring Group, Foshee Realty and Stephens Property Group of Atlanta when 90 acres of land near Alabama 181 and I-10 was optioned from Malbis Plantation, Inc in December 1997. Development of the site necessitated the cutting and removal of numerous trees and assorted debris. Temco, Inc., the company performing the burning of materials, had several plumes of smoke wafting across Alabama 181. This led to multiple complaints of trouble breathing from residents in nearby TimberCreek golf community and other adjacent neighborhoods in early October 2003. Additionally, a report by ADEM stated that Turkey Creek was contaminated with significant quantities of dirt and construction debris. Temco, Inc. was fined $15,000 by ADEM in December 2004.

Initially, Sears was considering a 100,000 square foot department store anchor along with a 9,000 square foot auto service center. Dillards joined the project with a 126,000 square foot store by the fall of 2001. After a competing open air development project in Daphne changed formats, Belk signed on as the second fashion anchor and opened an $8 million dollar 96,250 square foot store in March 2005. The leasing goal for the lifestyle center was to have approximately seventy percent of the in-line tenants new to the market. Some of the original smaller specialty stores included Williams-Sonoma, Pottery Barn, Hollister Co. and The Sharper Image. Bed Bath & Beyond opened its first South Alabama store at Eastern Shore Centre.

A multiplex theater complex had always been planned as an entertainment anchor for Eastern Shore Centre, and thus Premier Cinemas was constructed on a section of surface parking east of Belk in early 2008. This 45,000-square-foot (4,200 m^{2}) facility features more than 2,500 seats across fourteen screens and is Alabama's first all-digital theater complex.

In April 2015, Bed Bath & Beyond closed and relocated to the Jubilee Square power center in nearby Daphne. Regional shoe retailer Shoe Station relocated from an outparcel at Eastern Shore Plaza into a redeveloped 23,130 square foot combination of the former Bed Bath & Beyond and adjoining mall space in the fall of 2015.

In January 2017, home furnishings retailers Williams-Sonoma and Pottery Barn relocated to the Legacy Village at Spring Hill shopping center in West Mobile. Fast fashion retailer Forever 21 would develop a store comprising the former Pottery Barn and Williams-Sonoma spaces in spring 2018.

Phase five of development comprised the construction of a 54,817-square-foot (5,092.7 m^{2}) Publix supermarket and adjoining community-oriented strip mall on a 9-acre (36,000 m^{2}) site north of the Belk department store building. Publix supermarket opened as the anchor of the Eastern Shore Commons shopping center on November 19, 2011. According to the master and lease plans of Eastern Shore Centre, plans also call for the eventual development of a big-box retailer of no more than 140,000 square feet (13,000 m^{2}) to the east of the Publix-anchored strip mall, while an additional 45,000 square feet (4,200 m^{2}) of commercial space will be developed south of the Premiere Cinemas site.

== Eastern Shore Plaza ==
As it is a regional shopping center, Eastern Shore Centre also includes a smaller power center component located on site, adjacent to the lifestyle center. Eastern Shore Plaza, as this power center is known, is more than 250,000 square feet (23,000 m^{2}) in size and is tenanted with big-box stores such as Best Buy, PetSmart, Old Navy, Ross Dress For Less, Michaels, and Cost Plus World Market.
