= University Mall (Alabama) =

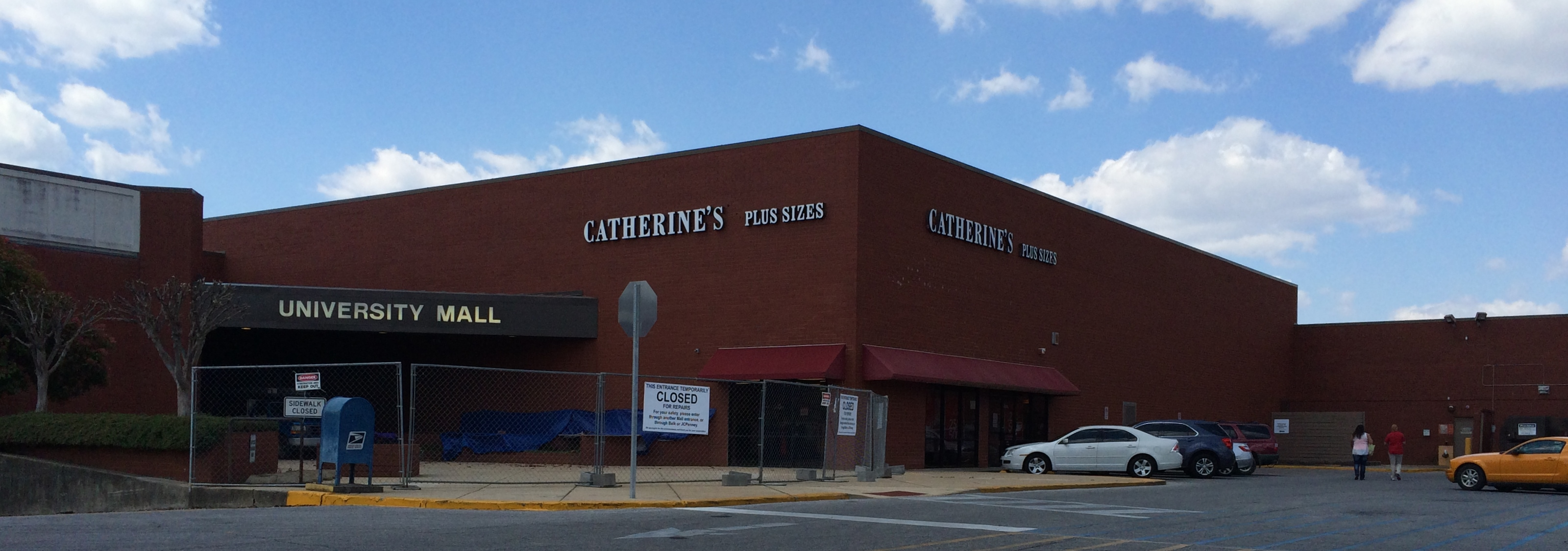
- Exterior view of University Mall, March 2014
- Location: Tuscaloosa, Alabama, U.S.
- Coordinates: 33.1948°N 87.5229°W
- Address: 1701 East McFarland Blvd; Tuscaloosa, AL 35404
- Opened: August 20, 1980; 46 years ago
- Developer: Aronov Realty
- Manager: Aronov Realty
- Owner: Aronov Realty
- Num. of stores: 78
- Num. of anchor tenants: 4 (3 open, 1 vacant)
- Floor area: 733,254 sq ft (68,121.5 m^{2})
- Floors: 1
- Website: http://university-mall.com/

University Mall is the largest mall in western Alabama. It is located at the intersection of McFarland Boulevard and Veterans' Memorial Parkway in Tuscaloosa, the busiest in the city. The anchor stores are JCPenney and 2 Belk stores. There is 1 vacant anchor store that was once Sears.

Owned and managed by the Montgomery-based Aronov Realty, the mall opened on August 20, 1980. Anchor stores of the 733,254 sq ft (68,121.5 m^{2}) enclosed mall include JCPenney (99,450 sq ft (9,239 m^{2})), the vacant Sears (105,000 sq ft (9,800 m^{2})), Belk Women (82,222 sq ft (7,638.7 m^{2})), and Belk Men, Home & Kids (90,174 sq ft (8,377.4 m^{2})). The only outlier property on mall premises is a branch of Regions Bank.

The property where University Mall now stands was previously home to the ruins of World War II-era Northington Naval Hospital and associated support buildings. These ruins were finally destroyed during the filming of the climactic scene of the 1978 Burt Reynolds film Hooper. The ruins of the hospital had lain derelict for many years and included a few dozen buildings as well as two immensely tall brick smoke-stacks. A few of the old barracks buildings remained until 2000; they housed the Tuscaloosa City Board of Education offices until they were relocated to the old Tuscaloosa High School (later Tuscaloosa Middle School) building on Queen City Avenue.

On April 27, 2011, the mall was narrowly missed by a powerful tornado that ripped through Tuscaloosa and killed dozens of people, sustaining moderate damage.

On November 2, 2017, it was announced that Sears would be closing as part of a plan to close 63 stores nationwide. The store closed in January 2018.
