= Airport Boulevard (Mobile, Alabama) =

Street in Mobile, Alabama, United States

- Part of: CR 56
- Location: Mobile, Alabama
- West end: MS 614 at the Mississippi state line towards Hurley, MS
- East end: US 90 in Mobile

Airport Boulevard is one of the main thoroughfares in Mobile County, Alabama. It is an east–west highway between Mobile County at the Mississippi state line and the city of Mobile.

In Mississippi, Airport Boulevard is known as Mississippi Highway 614. When it crosses the Alabama state line, its designation changes to Mobile County Highway 56 and its name changes to Airport Boulevard.

In 2001, State Farm Insurance identified the intersection of Airport Boulevard–University Boulevard as the most dangerous in the state of Alabama.

== Location ==
Airport Boulevard is the most important east–west thoroughfare in the county which does not enter the downtown business district. Airport Boulevard is a two-lane highway from the Mississippi state line until it intersects with Snow Road in the western part of the county where it becomes a five-lane highway. It becomes a divided four-lane highway near the Mobile Regional Airport, territory which was annexed into the city in January 2008. Its first major intersection in the city limits is with Schillinger Road, a four-lane highway which has become a major shopping district over the years, which is what prompted the city to annex it around the same time as the airport. Airport continues as a four-lane highway until it reaches Cody Road (Mobile County Highway 37, the pre-2007 city limit in this area). Once it crosses Cody, Airport becomes a six-lane highway.

Airport continues through Mobile, having major intersections at Hillcrest, University, McGregor/Azalea, Downtowner, Montlimar/Yester Oaks, Interstate 65, Bel Air, Sage and Florida. East of the Florida Street intersection, Airport reverts to a four-lane highway until it reaches Williams Street where it becomes a two-lane road (with a turn lane) before transitioning into a two-lane side street. The last two major intersections of Airport Boulevard are with Dauphin Island Parkway (for which Airport serves as the northern end) and the Government Street (U.S. Highway 90)/Houston Street intersection. Airport continues east of Government Street very briefly where it finally terminates at Old Government Street.

== Overview ==
Airport Boulevard serves as both the heart of Mobile and a geographic boundary. West of the Government–Houston intersection, the city of Mobile considers Airport to be the dividing line between the north and south sides, determining how the city allocates public services, such as garbage pickup.

Airport is a semi-controlled access thoroughfare between Azalea and Sage; some turns which would hinder traffic are forbidden from Airport onto north–south intersecting roads, with the service roads being the required method of entry.

Airport Boulevard serves as the north–south dividing line for Azalea Road and McGregor Boulevard. South of Airport the thoroughfare is a four-lane highway known as Azalea Road. North of Airport it is a two-lane neighborhood street known as McGregor Avenue, which traverses the upscale Spring Hill district.

Airport also serves as the dividing line between Yester Oaks Drive, which becomes Montlimar south of the highway, and McGregor Drive. Montlimar is a wholly commercial thoroughfare, which is a four-lane highway with a turn lane. Yester Oaks is a residential street that passes through the Spring Hill district.

== Businesses ==
Airport Boulevard has parallel service roads, primarily east of Azalea Road, which remain a prominent feature of the thoroughfare until it reaches Sage Avenue.

Many of Mobile's leading shopping centers, including Shoppes at Bel Air, Mobile Festival Centre, PineBrook Shopping Center, and Springdale Plaza are located on Airport Boulevard, and the area around Airport Boulevard and Interstate 65 was the dominant suburban retail shopping district until the eventual development of the Schillinger Road area and the various shopping complexes in Baldwin County. The area surrounding the Airport Boulevard/I-65 interchange is also home to substantial restaurant and hospitality development. In the last decade, the two regional centers, Bel Air and Springdale, have experienced levels of retail vacancies. Airport Boulevard is also home to the large medical facility USA Providence Hospital, which moved to its Airport Boulevard location from a Springhill Avenue location in Midtown in 1986.

Airport Boulevard has one educational facility, located outside of the Mobile city limits. That facility is Baker High School. Airport is also close to Corpus Christi Catholic School, which is located on McKenna Drive, which is a spur of Hillcrest roughly a half mile north of Airport and which can also be reached by Hillview Road, which is a spur of Airport.

== Boundary line ==
Upon entering the city limits, Airport briefly serves as the north–south boundary line between City Council Districts 6 and 7 (with 6 to the south and 7 to the north). Furthermore, it is split evenly between City Council District 6 and City Council District 5. The boundary line is University Boulevard, with District 6 to the west and District 5 to the east. District 5 is currently represented by Reggie Copeland, the city council president, who has served on the council since 1985. District 6 is currently represented by Connie Hudson, who has served on the council since 2001.

Major subdivisions and neighborhoods along Airport include Huntleigh Woods, Willowbrook, Pinehurst, Bit & Spur, Ridgefield, Regency (home to one of Mobile's two synagogues), Jackson Heights, Sunset Woods, Yester Oaks, Llanfair, and Delwood (a neighborhood of 1950s era mansions with very unusual architecture).
