= McRae's =

American regional department store chain

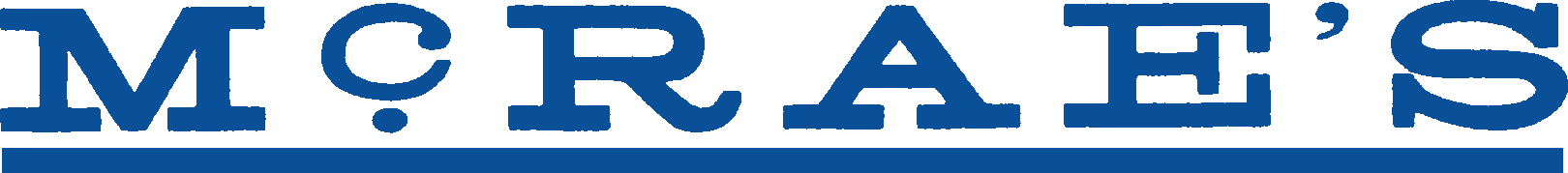
- Type: Department store
- Industry: Retail
- Founded: 1902 (Jackson, Mississippi)
- Defunct: March 8, 2006
- Fate: Acquired by Proffits
- Headquarters: Jackson, Mississippi
- Products: Clothing, footwear, bedding, furniture, jewelry, beauty products, housewares
- Parent: Saks Incorporated (1998–2005); Belk (2006)

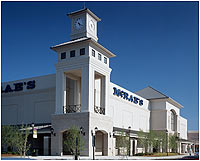
A McRae's Department Store at the Dogwood Festival Market in Flowood, Mississippi

McRae's was a mid-range regional department store chain founded and based in Jackson, Mississippi, with locations in Mississippi, Alabama, Louisiana, and Florida. The nameplate was in existence for more than a century.

== History ==
Samuel P. McRae founded the store in Jackson, Mississippi in 1902 as a dry goods store. It remained a family-owned business through the ensuing decades, while continuing to grow. Sales increased from only $1 million in 1955 to $10 million in 1970. The first location outside Mississippi opened in University Mall (now University Town Plaza) in Pensacola, Florida in 1974. In 1987, McRae's acquired 13 stores in Alabama from Pizitz. With strengths in home furnishings, men's apparel, and cosmetics, the chain was considered one of the most successful family-owned businesses in the country.

McRae's was acquired by Tennessee-based Proffitt's in 1993 in a transaction that The New York Times called "a case of a little fish swallowing a bigger one." McRae's had 28 stores with combined annual sales of $419 million and Proffitt's had 25 stores with annual sales of only $201 million. After the sale, McRae's stores retained their name and were operated as a separate subsidiary.

Proffitt's merged with Saks Holdings, owner of Saks Fifth Avenue, in 1998. The merged company changed its name to Saks Incorporated. Proffitt's and McRae's became part of Saks Incorporated's Southern Department Store Group.

Foley's acquired one McRae's in Louisiana at The Mall at Cortana, run by Mike Herndon. As Saks sought repositioning as a more luxury retail-oriented operation, its mid-range chains became targets for sale. McRae's and Proffitt's were among the first to be sold. Charlotte-based Belk, the nation's largest privately owned department store chain, bought Proffitt's/McRae's in a deal that closed in July 2005.

On March 8, 2006, most McRae's stores were rebranded into Belk stores, with three stores excluded. Locations in Tuscaloosa and Gadsden, Alabama were retained by Saks to convert to its Parisian chain, though both stores eventually would be among the Parisian locations also sold to Belk. In addition, the Mall of Louisiana store in Baton Rouge became a Dillard's location.
