= World Market (store) =

Retail store chain in the United States

World Market, Inc.

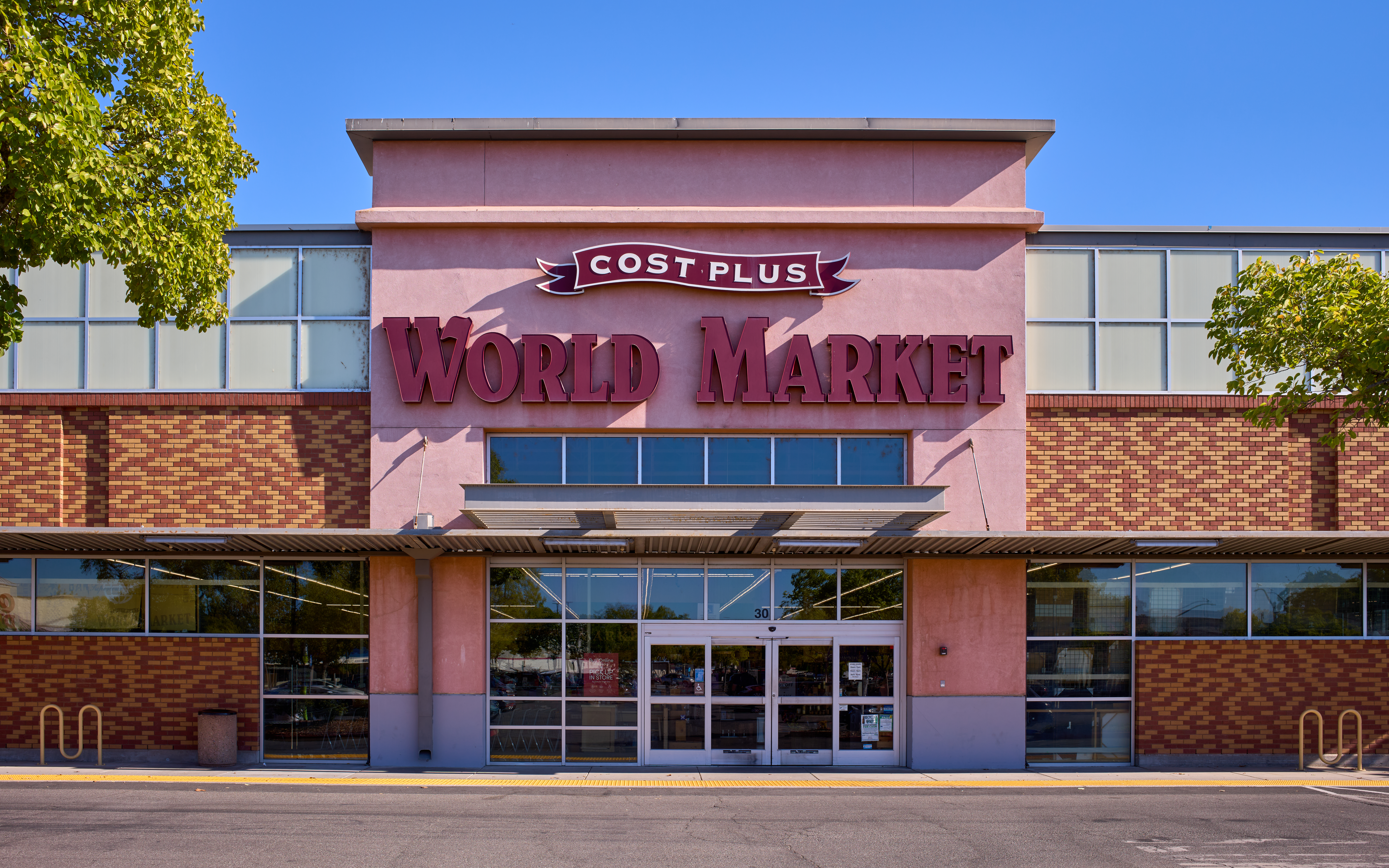
- World Market store in Chico, California
- Trade name: World Market
- Formerly: Cost Plus World Market (1990s–2021)
- Type: Private
- Industry: Retail, online shopping
- Founded: 1958; 68 years ago Fisherman's Wharf, San Francisco, California, U.S.
- Founder: William Amthor; Lincoln Bartlett
- Headquarters: Alameda, California, U.S.
- Number of locations: 258 (2020)
- Area served: United States
- Key people: Alex Smith, Executive Chairman
- Products: Furniture and decor, apparel, international foods
- Revenue: US$963.83 million (2011)
- Net income: US$16.5 million (2011)
- Number of employees: 6,127
- Parent: Bed Bath & Beyond (2012–2021); Kingswood Capital Management (2021–present)
- Website: www.worldmarket.com

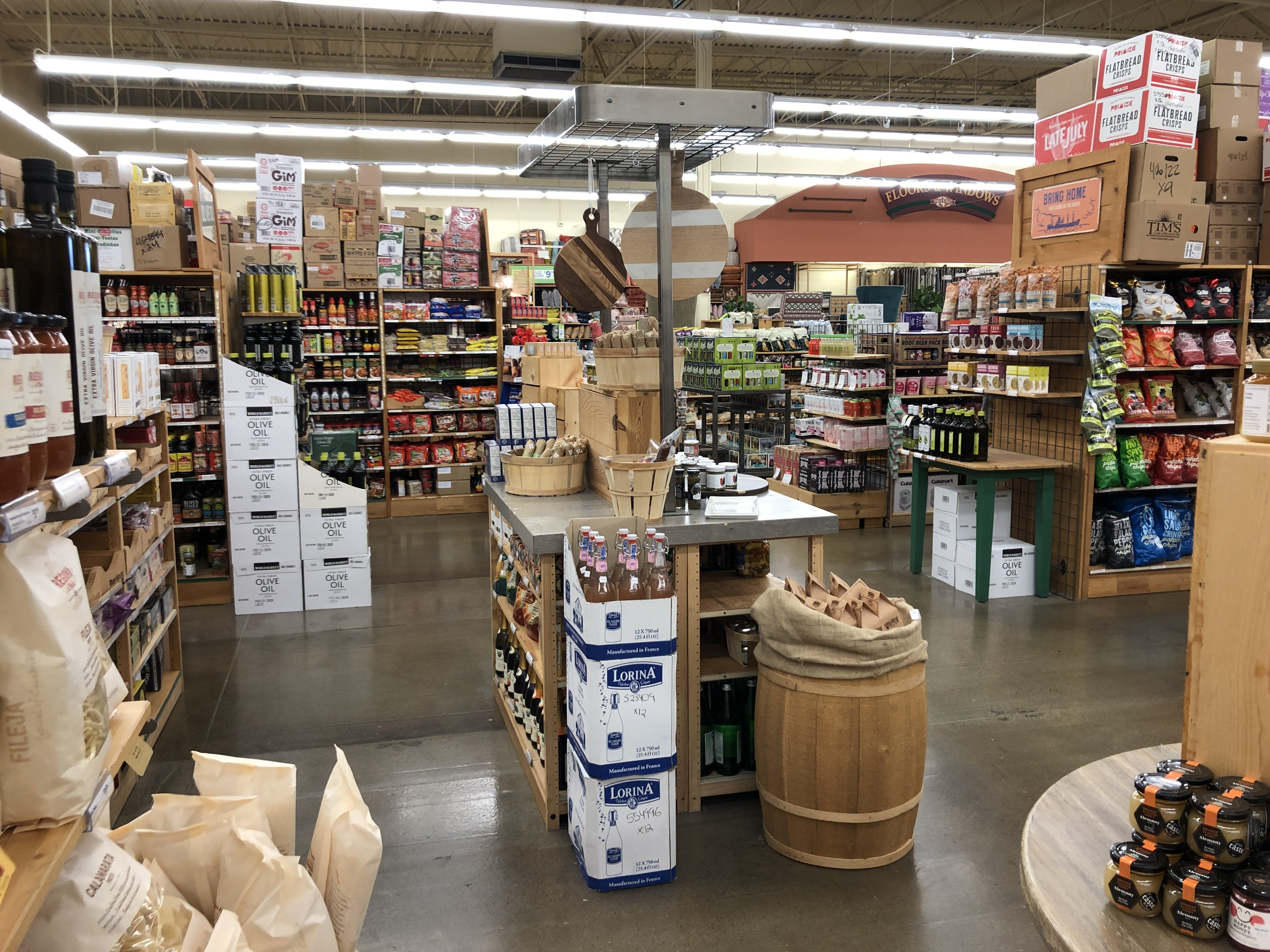
Inside a Cost Plus World Market in Kennesaw, Georgia

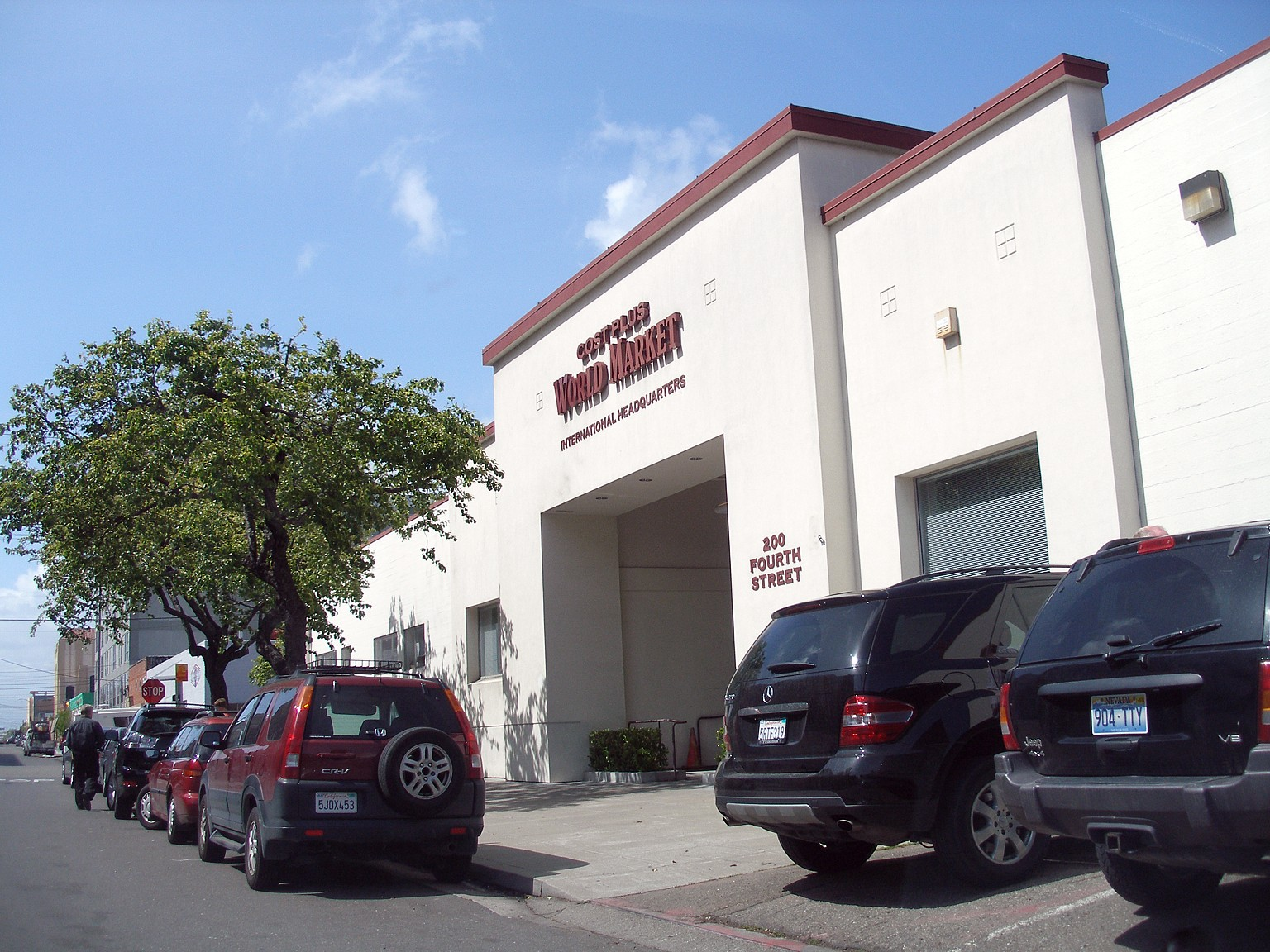
Former headquarters of Cost Plus World Market in Oakland, California

World Market, formerly Cost Plus World Market, is an American chain of specialty/import retail stores, selling home furniture, decor, curtains, rugs, gifts, apparel, coffee, wine, craft beer, and international food products. The brand's original name came from the initial concept, since abandoned, of selling items for "cost plus 10%". The company was owned by Bed Bath & Beyond from 2012 to 2021, and is currently headquartered in Alameda, California.

== History ==
On 23 October 1958, William Amthor and Lincoln Bartlett opened the first Cost Plus Imports store at 2552 Taylor Street in the Fisherman's Wharf area of San Francisco. Amthor and Bartlett worked at Amthor's family's import business in San Francisco, which had imported a surplus of wicker furniture. Unable to offload the pieces via wholesale, they rented 4,000 square feet (370 m^{2}) of warehouse space in the Fisherman's Wharf area. The imported furniture sold quickly, and Amthor began a new business as a retailer. When the first store opened in 1958, it was devoted to wicker and rattan that the company had imported. The store was named Cost Plus after their strategy of pricing the imported goods at cost, plus ten percent. The stores featured an eclectic mix of imported furniture and home furnishings, displayed in the style of a bazaar.

In 1962, with the help of the Tandy Corporation (the owner of Radio Shack), Cost Plus Imports incorporated and opened its first franchise location in San Mateo, California. From 1962 to 1965, Cost Plus opened 15 franchised locations in California and Texas. While Cost Plus owned the brand name and imported the merchandise, the franchise stores themselves were owned by Tandy. In 1965, the management of the franchise operation had decided that the business model of Cost Plus was too oriented toward sales from their large store in San Francisco, which Tandy viewed as not well-suited for smaller franchises. They gave Cost Plus 12 months notice that they would be starting their own operation and in 1966, the franchises were successfully importing their own products and had rebranded as Pier 1 Imports, run as a division of Tandy Corporation. The two companies would remain competitors for many decades.

Cost Plus was left only with its original San Francisco store, but decided to once again rebuild a chain, opening their first wholly owned branch store, once again in San Mateo, in a large location in Hillsdale Shopping Center. In 1968, Cost Plus would open a third location in Mayfield Mall in Mountain View, California. The chain would eventually grow to 258 stores across 39 states and Washington, D.C. The Fisherman's Wharf location would have a floor size of 40,000 square feet at its peak and remained Cost Plus's flagship store for many years, but the company would eventually reduce the size of this location, and it closed permanently in 2020.

The 1973 action film Magnum Force includes a shootout at the San Francisco Cost Plus location.

In 1987, Bechtel Investments (Fremont Group) completed a leveraged buyout. The company's profits declined during the 1980s, but a significant reorganization of the company's stores and product line during the early 1990s turned the company's fortunes around, and it began a round of expansion, expanding to over 100 stores by the end of the decade. During this period, Cost Plus shifted the branding of its stores to either Cost Plus World Market or simply World Market in markets new to the brand (generally in the eastern or southern regions of the United States). In 1996, Cost Plus World Market went public and began trading on the NASDAQ stock exchange.

In February 2006, Cost Plus World Market reported quarterly earnings of $125 million, with $367 million in revenue for the fourth fiscal quarter of 2006. Annual earnings were $280 million with over $800 million in revenue. By 2008 the company was operating at a loss, and rebuffed an 88.4 million dollar takeover bid by its early spinoff, Pier 1 Imports.

In 2012, Cost Plus was acquired by Bed Bath & Beyond for $495 million.

In 2014, Cost Plus World Market launched an online crowdsourcing-model marketplace, Craft by World Market. The website posts items for one month at a time, and sells only products that attract enough pre-orders to be worthwhile.

In October 2019, Bed Bath and Beyond announced pending closure of 40 Bed Bath and Beyond stores and 20 stores of World Market and other subsidiaries, including the original store at Fisherman's Wharf. The company sold Cost Plus World Market to Kingswood Capital Management in February 2021.
