= Spanish Fort, Alabama =

City in Alabama, United States

- City
- Flag Seal
- Motto: A City of Spirit!
- Location of the City of Spanish Fort, Alabama
- Coordinates: 30°43′20″N 87°54′04″W
- Country: United States
- State: Alabama
- County: Baldwin
- Incorporated: July 19, 1993

Area
  - Total: 35.73 sq mi (92.53 km^{2})
  - Land: 31.02 sq mi (80.34 km^{2})
  - Water: 4.71 sq mi (12.19 km^{2})
- Elevation: 49 ft (15 m)

Population (2020)
  - Total: 10,049
  - Density: 324.0/sq mi (125.08/km^{2})
- Time zone: UTC-6 (Central (CST))
  - Summer (DST): UTC-5 (CDT)
- ZIP codes: 36527, 36577
- Area code: 251
- FIPS code: 01-71976
- GNIS feature ID: 2405500
- Website: www.cityofspanishfort.com

Spanish Fort is a city in Baldwin County, Alabama, United States, located on the eastern shore of Mobile Bay. The 2020 census lists the population of the city as 10,049. It is a suburb of Mobile and is part of the Daphne-Fairhope-Foley metropolitan area.

== History ==
The city of Spanish Fort is rich in history dating as far back as 1702 with the founding of Mobile by Jean-Baptiste Le Moyne de Bienville of France. Spanish Fort was originally the site of a trading post established by French-occupied Mobile. One of the earliest known colonists that settled in present-day Spanish Fort was Louis Augustin Rochon, son of co-founder of Mobile Charles Rochon. Around 1750-1760, the younger Rochon founded a plantation on the bluffs overlooking the Blakeley River that became relatively wealthy. Following the French and Indian War, a large area on the Gulf Coast including the trading post was ceded to the British in 1763. During the Revolutionary War, Spanish forces under Bernardo de Gálvez took Mobile in the Battle of Fort Charlotte. Consequentially, the entire Mobile Bay area came under military administration, albeit challenged by British forces based in Pensacola.

At this time, the embattled Eastern Shore of Mobile Bay was subjected to raids from various native American tribes allied to both sides. On October 1, 1780, the Rochon plantation was raided and razed by Choctaw warriors, killing three members of the household, a young man named Trouillet, an enslaved African man, and an enslaved native woman. Thinking the family to be Spanish citizens, they captured the rest and marched them to Pensacola. This action was met with scoff as the Rochons had remained cooperative to both British and Spanish authorities and General Campbell ransomed their release.

During the American Civil War, Spanish Fort was heavily fortified as an eastern defense to the city of Mobile. Fort Huger, Fort (Battery) Tracey, Fort (Battery) McDermott, Fort Alexis, Red Fort, and Old Spanish Fort were all part of the Mobile defenses in what is now Spanish Fort. After the Union victory in the Battle of Mobile Bay, Mobile nevertheless remained in Confederate hands. Union forces embarked on a land campaign in early 1865 to take Mobile from the east. Spanish Fort was the site of the Battle of Spanish Fort in the Mobile Campaign of the war. Its fall allowed Union forces to concentrate on Fort Blakeley to the north, and hence destroy the last organized resistance east of the Mississippi River. The falls of Spanish Fort and Fort Blakeley permitted Union troops to subsequently enter Mobile unopposed after the conclusion of the Civil War.

Though the city of Spanish Fort is named for the Confederate fortification system that was built to defend against Union forces, the name of the "Old Spanish Fort" has largely been erroneously connected to the Battle at The Village in January 1781. The fort built prior to this battle by Spanish forces was previously thought to be at present-day Spanish Fort, but the site is far more likely to be at today's Daphne, near Village Point. This erroneous assignment derives from the Civil War. In August 1864, Colonel John H. Gindrat recommended to Confederate engineer Lieutenant Colonel Viktor Ernst Karl Rudolf von Scheliha that the most advantageous location to establish a fortification system would be at "the old Spanish Fort." Though historians and archaeologists propose that this was likely a small Spanish military post later in the colonial period, it is not the same that was defended in the 1781 battle and is backed by archaeological evidence.

Before the incorporation of Spanish Fort, the predecessor to the city was a community known as Bridgehead. This community formed after the construction of the causeway connecting Mobile and Baldwin counties. Prior to this, no community existed on-site and the area that is now Spanish Fort was rural.

Since incorporating on July 19, 1993, Spanish Fort has seen significant growth. Eastern Shore Centre, an open air regional shopping complex, opened on November 17, 2004. Spanish Fort Town Center contributed to the municipality's substantial commercial development, despite having ongoing issues with vacancies.

On November 1, 2012, groundbreaking ceremonies were held at the northwest corner of Spanish Fort Boulevard and Blakeley Way, site of the new Spanish Fort Community Center. The administrative staff officially occupied the new facility in September 2015. The center is home to the city library, administrative offices, the mayor's office, and other city-run services.

== Geography ==
Spanish Fort is located above the east shore of the Blakeley River where it enters Mobile Bay. U.S. Routes 90 and 98 (Battleship Parkway) lead west across the Mobile River and its distributaries 9 miles (14 km) to Mobile. Interstate 10 passes just to the south of Spanish Fort, with access from exits 35 and 38, and leads west across Mobile Bay to Mobile as well.

According to the U.S. Census Bureau, Spanish Fort has a total area of 33.4 square miles (86.5 km^{2}), of which 28.7 square miles (74.3 km^{2}) is land and 4.7 square miles (12.2 km^{2}), or 14.08%, is water.

== Education ==
Spanish Fort is a part of the Baldwin County Public Schools system under direction of Superintendent Eddie Tyler. Three elementary schools, a middle school, and a high school serve Spanish Fort. As enrollment numbers have risen, the high school as well as Rockwell Elementary School have had building additions. Baldwin County Public Schools was approved by the County Commission to establish a four-year, $60 million loan to fund the new additions across the county. This included opening Stonebridge Elementary School in 2022.

=== Schools ===
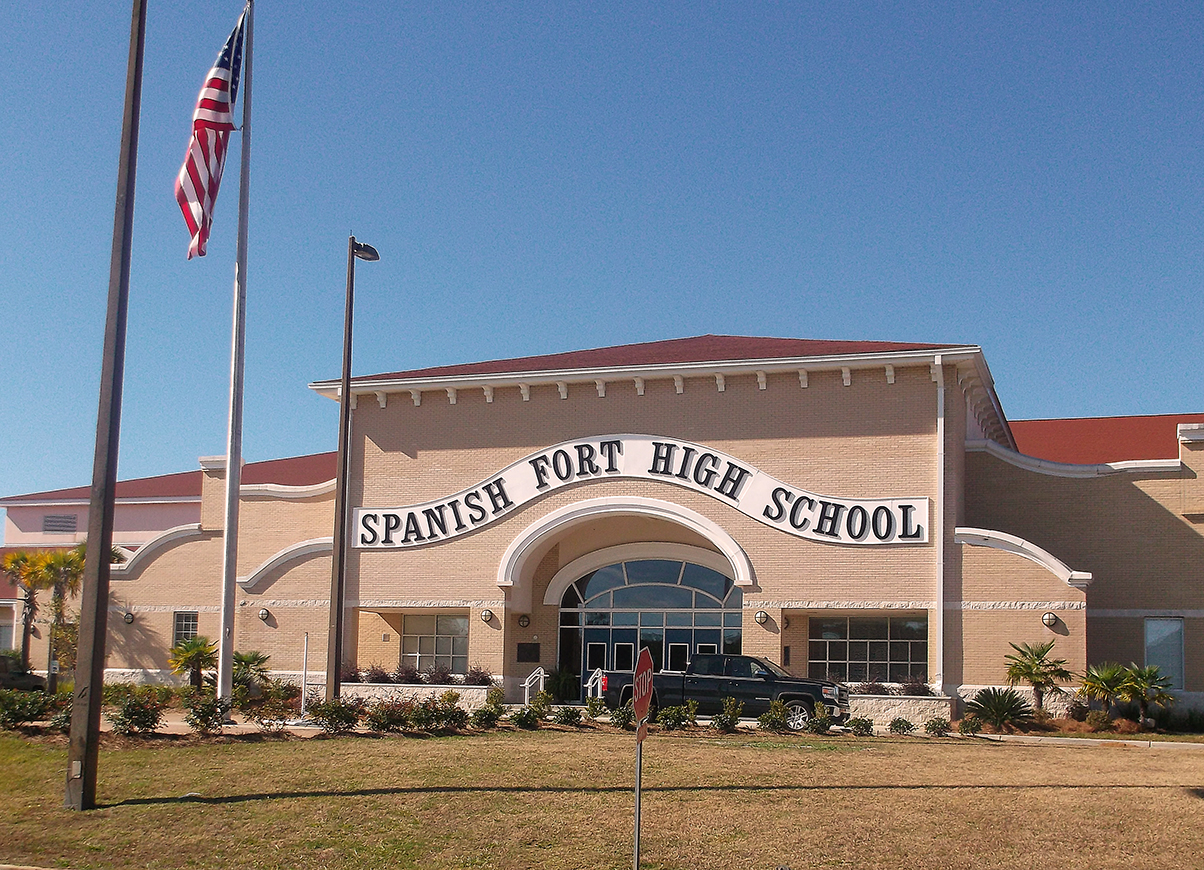
Spanish Fort High School

Secondary schools

- Spanish Fort High School (9-12)
- Spanish Fort Middle School (7-8)

Elementary schools (both K-6)

- Spanish Fort Elementary School
- Rockwell Elementary School
- Stonebridge Elementary School

== Demographics ==
Historical population
| Census | Pop. | Note | %± |
|---|---|---|---|
| 1970 | 2,364 | | — |
| 1980 | 3,415 | | 44.5% |
| 1990 | 3,732 | | 9.3% |
| 2000 | 5,423 | | 45.3% |
| 2010 | 6,798 | | 25.4% |
| 2020 | 10,049 | | 47.8% |
| 2025 (est.) | 11,203 | ▲ | 11.5% |
U.S. Decennial Census; 2013 Estimate

=== 2020 census ===
As of the 2020 census, Spanish Fort had a population of 10,049. This represented a 47.8% increase from 2010. The median age was 39.1 years. 24.3% of residents were under the age of 18 and 16.3% of residents were 65 years of age or older. For every 100 females there were 97.2 males, and for every 100 females age 18 and over there were 93.0 males age 18 and over.

87.6% of residents lived in urban areas, while 12.4% lived in rural areas.

There were 3,876 households in Spanish Fort, of which 36.6% had children under the age of 18 living in them. Of all households, 56.4% were married-couple households, 17.6% were households with a male householder and no spouse or partner present, and 21.2% were households with a female householder and no spouse or partner present. About 24.5% of all households were made up of individuals and 8.6% had someone living alone who was 65 years of age or older.

There were 4,263 housing units, of which 9.1% were vacant. The homeowner vacancy rate was 1.6% and the rental vacancy rate was 14.2%.

Spanish Fort racial composition
| Race | Num. | Perc. |
|---|---|---|
| White (non-Hispanic) | 8,295 | 82.55% |
| Black or African American (non-Hispanic) | 610 | 6.07% |
| Native American | 46 | 0.46% |
| Asian | 179 | 1.78% |
| Pacific Islander | 7 | 0.07% |
| Other/Mixed | 491 | 4.89% |
| Hispanic or Latino | 421 | 4.19% |

=== 2010 census ===
As of the 2010 census, there were 6,798 people, 2,861 households, and 1,910 families residing in the city. The population density was 237 inhabitants per square mile (92/km^{2}). There were 3,250 housing units at an average density of 97.3 per square mile (37.6/km^{2}). The racial makeup of the city was 91.0% White, 4.8% Black or African American, 0.6% Native American, 1.4% Asian, 0.7% from other races, and 1.4% from two or more races. 2.4% of the population were Hispanic or Latino of any race.

There were 2,861 households, out of which 29.0% had children under the age of 18 living with them, 53.9% were married couples living together, 9.0% had a female householder with no husband present, and 33.2% were non-families. 28.0% of all households were made up of individuals, and 12.6% had someone living alone who was 65 years of age or older. The average household size was 2.37 and the average family size was 2.93.

In the city, the population was 23.0% under the age of 18, 7.4% from 18 to 24, 24.4% from 25 to 44, 28.4% from 45 to 64, and 16.8% who were 65 years of age or older. The median age was 41.5 years. For every 100 females, there were 95.7 males. For every 100 females age 18 and over, there were 100.9 males. The median income for a household in the city was $65,244, and the median income for a family was $76,469. Males had a median income of $58,958 versus $36,695 for females. The per capita income for the city was $32,856. About 1.8% of families and 3.2% of the population were below the poverty line, including 1.1% of those under age 18 and 2.8% of those age 65 or over.

== Transportation ==
Countywide dial-a-ride transit service is provided by the Baldwin Regional Area Transit System (BRATS).

== See also ==
- Eastern Shore (Alabama)
