= Colonial Properties =

Colonial Properties Trust
- Industry: Real estate investment trust
- Founded: 1970; 56 years ago
- Defunct: October 1, 2013; 12 years ago
- Fate: Acquired by Mid-America Apartment Communities
- Headquarters: Birmingham, Alabama
- Key people: Thomas H. Lowder, Chairman and CEO; C. Reynolds Thompson, President and CFO

Colonial Properties Trust was a publicly traded diversified real estate investment trust headquartered in Birmingham, Alabama. In October 2013, the company was acquired by Mid-America Apartment Communities.

== Company history ==
In 1970, the company was founded by Edward Lowder, the father of Bobby Lowder, the head of the failed Colonial Bank and Colonial Bancgroup.

In September 1993, the company became a public company via an initial public offering.

In 1994, the company acquired the Rime Companies for $190.7 million. Rime owned 10 apartment complexes containing 4,953 apartment units. The acquisition increased the number of apartment owned by the company to 10,873 and made it the largest apartment owner in Alabama.

In 2004, the company acquired Cornerstone Realty Income Trust for $650 million in stock.

In 2005, the company partnered with DRA Advisors to acquire CRT properties. Colonial received a 15% stake in CRT, which was acquired for $1.8 billion. CRT owned 11.7 million square feet of office space mostly in Atlanta, Houston, Orlando and Charlotte.

In 2007, a joint venture between the company and DRA Advisors sold 15 properties in Arizona, Nevada, and New Mexico containing 3,959 units for $468 million.

In 2014, the company sold Brookwood Village, which it had acquired in 1999.

In October 2013, the company was acquired by Mid-America Apartment Communities.
