= G&L Clothing =

G&L Clothing Company, Inc
- Company type: Private
- Industry: Clothing
- Founded: 1917
- Headquarters: United States
- Products: Work clothing and footwear
- Website: http://www.gandlclothing.com

G&L Clothing is a privately held clothing store based in Des Moines, Iowa. It was founded in 1917 by Lou Garsh and Meyer Levine. The company is owned by the Marcovis family who maintain daily operations of the business. G&L Clothing sells casual clothing and workwear, specializing in big and tall sizes.

== History ==
G&L dates back to 1917, when Lou Garsh and Meyer Levine first opened their doors. They sold work clothing, shoes and boots to railroaders, construction workers, farmers and tradesmen. Garsh left six months later, but Levine never got around to changing the name.

In 1928, Harry Winner came to work for Levine and was made a full partner shortly after World War II. Winner continued to run the business after Meyers death in the 1960s.

In 1981, Jim Marcovis purchased G&L Clothing. Marcovis previously owned The Loft jean stores which were located in Valley West Mall, Merle Hay Mall and other locations. During the Great Flood of 1993 G&L Clothing expanded, nearly doubling its size. After surviving a fire and subsequent water damage the following year, a larger, more devastating blaze temporarily closed the store in late 1994. After four weeks, the store was able to reopen in the old WHO (AM) Radio building at Eleventh and Walnut Streets in downtown Des Moines. In February 1996 the company opened its current store at 1801 Ingersoll Ave, just west of the downtown area.

In October 2017, G&L Clothing celebrated 100 years in business with donations to community organizations.
