= Beaverdale (Des Moines) =

Coordinates: 41°37′3″N 93°40′2″W

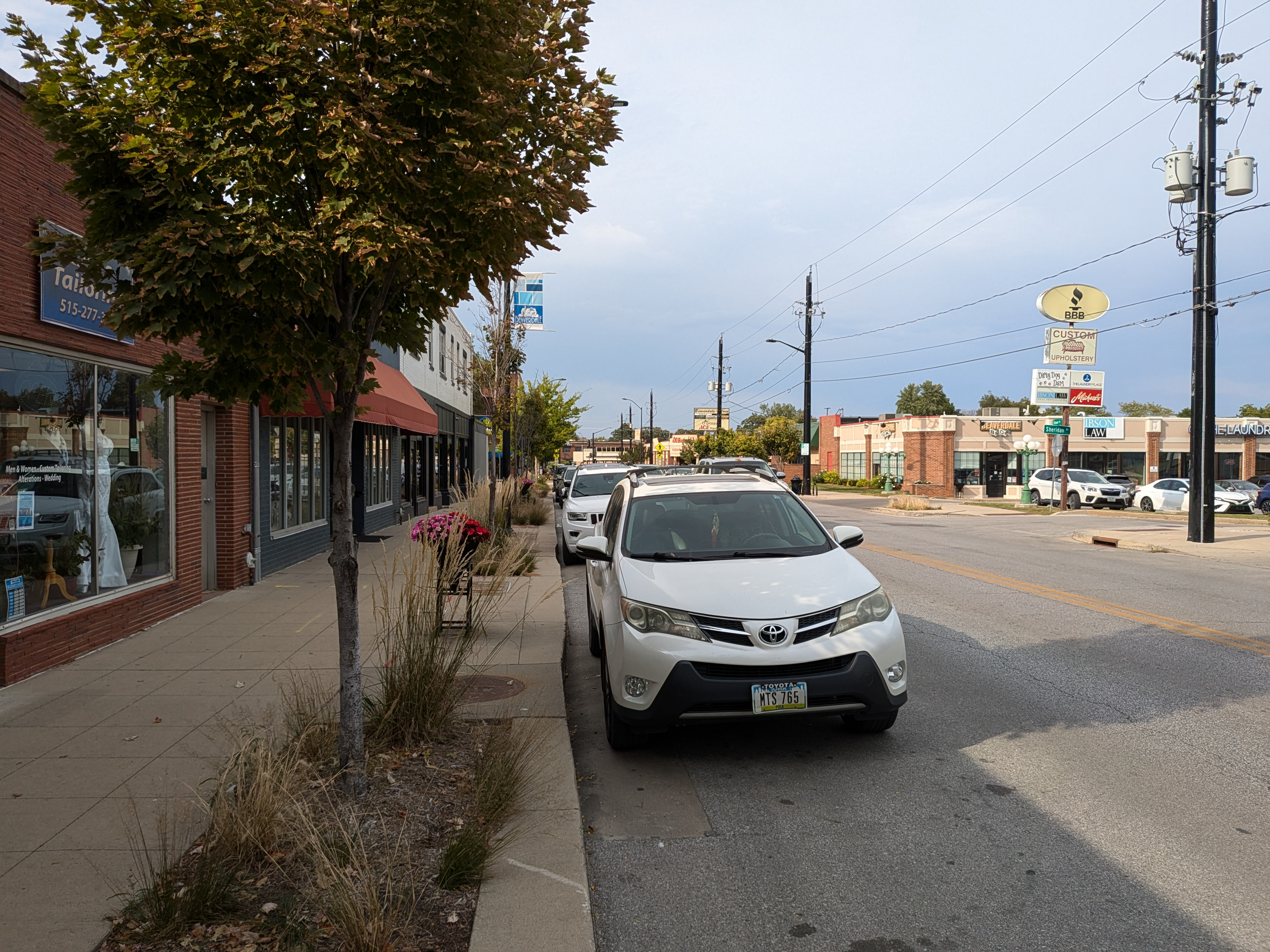
- The main business district located on Beaver Avenue
- Interactive map of Beaverdale
- Country: United States
- State: Iowa
- Counties: Polk County
- City: Des Moines
- Elevation: 292 ft (89 m)

Population (2015)
  - Total: 8,000
- ZIP code: 50310, 50311
- Area code: 515
- Website: Beaverdale Neighborhood Association

The Beaverdale neighborhood is one of the largest of the 51 recognized neighborhood associations in the city of Des Moines, Iowa, in the United States. It extends from Forest Avenue at its southernmost border to the city limits at its northern border.

Once considered the rural, western edge of nineteenth century Des Moines, what is now Beaverdale consisted of large land tracts devoted to fruit orchards and truck farms. Early traffic crossed the area on an unpaved stagecoach highway known, since before the Civil War, as the Fort Dodge Stage Road. The road was renamed Beaver Avenue in 1903 and was later improved in 1917 with brick paving. The entire northwest section of Des Moines was commonly known as "Urbandale" until 1917, when the name was formally adopted by an adjacent suburban village. Soon afterwards, city residents from the area met and selected "Beaverdale" as the name to identify their neighborhood.

Most of the subdivisions were developed in the period between 1920 and 1940, when cars were becoming an essential part of every household. A major phase of construction occurred after the economic depression of the 1930s. Federal mortgage financing was created to encourage home buying. The local developers followed a variety of traditional home designs and they incorporated the latest trends in electrical conveniences into their plans. It was during this time, in 1938, that the fashionable "Beaverdale Brick" homes, built by local contractor E.T. McMurray, appeared. For the most part, the subdivisions were laid out in basic grid patterns, a convenient standard throughout Midwestern urban development. Two exceptions, Maryland Park and Ashby Manor, are notable for their winding drives and their early attention to design elements that create distinctive and attractive home settings.

In 2017, the neighborhood celebrated its centennial, marking 100 years of existence. A 116-foot-long Beaverdale mural was painted on the north wall of Uptempo Music, 2714 Beaver Ave.

== Areas of interest ==
Beaverdale is 10 minutes from downtown Des Moines, five minutes from Drake University and Varsity Theater, five minutes from Merle Hay Mall, and 10 minutes from Valley West Mall. The Beaverdale Neighborhood Association hosts many events throughout the year. The neighborhood hosts an Easter egg hunt in the spring, a music festival each summer, and a holiday lights contest in the winter. The Beaverdale Fall Festival parade occurs on the third weekend in September.

Most of the students who live in this area typically attend either Hoover High School or Roosevelt High School.

== Parks and recreation ==
The Beaverdale neighborhood contains over 50 acres (20 ha) of public parkland that offers a variety of recreational activities.
