= Southridge =

Southridge High School may refer to:

- Southridge High School (Kennewick) in Kennewick, Washington, United States
- Southridge High School (Beaverton) in Beaverton, Oregon, United States
- Miami Southridge High School in Miami, Florida, United States
- Southridge School in Surrey, British Columbia, Canada
- PAREF Southridge School in Muntinlupa, Philippines
- Southridge High School (Huntingburg, Indiana), United States

Southridge Mall may refer to:

- Southridge Mall (Iowa), in Des Moines, Iowa
- Southridge Mall (Wisconsin), in Milwaukee, Wisconsin
