= Galleria Tower =

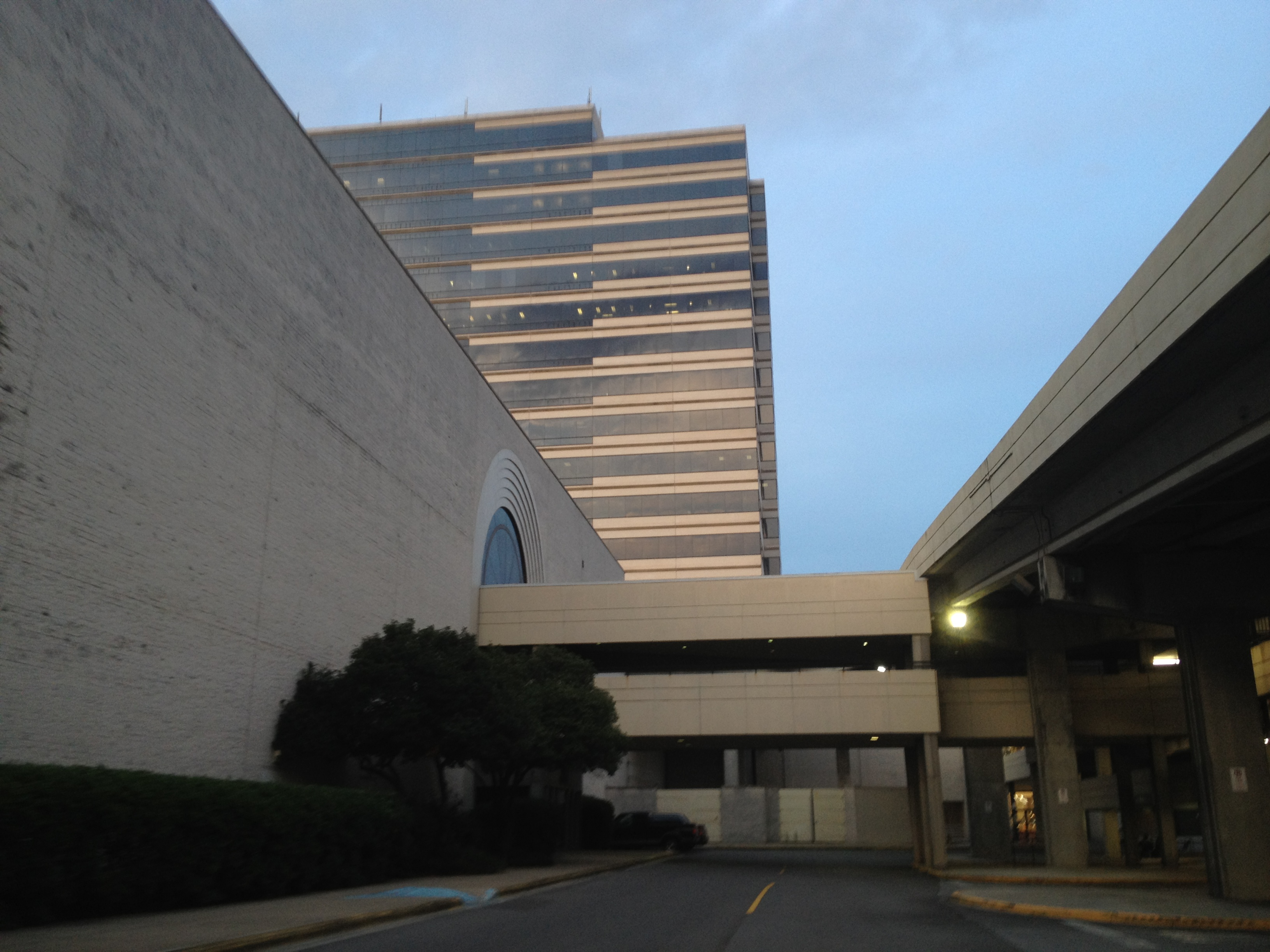
- Interactive map of the Galleria Tower area

General information
- Status: Completed
- Type: Class A Office Building
- Location: 3000 Riverchase Galleria; Hoover, AL 35244
- Coordinates: 33.379214°N 86.809368°W
- Construction started: 1983
- Opening: 1986
- Owner: Jim Wilson & Associates and Brookfield Properties
- Operator: Harbert Realty Services

Height
- Antenna spire: 250 feet (76 m)
- Top floor: 17

Technical details
- Floor count: 17
- Floor area: 285,000 square feet (26,477 m^{2})
- Lifts/elevators: 6

Design and construction
- Architect: Hellmuth, Obata & Kassabaum
- Developer: Jim Wilson & Associates
- Main contractor: Harbert Corporation

The Galleria Tower is a 17-story, 375,000 square foot (26,000 m^{2}) office building located at the Riverchase Galleria in Hoover, a suburb of Birmingham, Alabama, United States. The building was developed by Jim Wilson & Associates as a part of the Riverchase Galleria. Construction began in 1983 and was completed in 1986. The building connects to the Galleria via a large glass atrium.

The building is the tallest office building outside of the Downtown Birmingham District.

== Location at the Galleria ==
In 1986 when the Galleria opened it was accessed by a ramp behind Macy's on the exterior and the food court elevator up at the third floor on the interior. Later the tower was connected to both the JCPenney parking deck and the Sears parking deck. This allowed easy access from the exterior and parking to the offices. Von Maur's third floor includes an exit that leads outside and directly across to the tower.

== Tenants ==
One of the major tenants of the building is Walter Energy. MedPartners was headquartered in the building from 1993 until 2004. For a period of time the MedPartners logo was displayed at the top of the building, but it was removed following the company changing its name to Caremark Rx in 2000. Caremark relocated from the building in 2004. Surgical Care Affiliates relocated at the start of 2015. KBR (Kellogg Brown and Root) Birmingham have plans to move to the tower in May 2016.

== See also ==
- List of tallest buildings in Birmingham, Alabama
