= Andy & Evan =

American children's clothing brand

- Industry: Retail
- Founded: New York City, United States (2009; 17 years ago)
- Founder: Andy Perl; Evan Hakalir
- Headquarters: New York City
- Products: Clothing
- Number of employees: 10
- Website: www.andyandevan.com

Andy & Evan is an American children's clothing brand founded in 2009 that designs, manufactures, and sells luxury clothing for boys and girls. They are distributed at upper tier Department Stores such as Neiman Marcus, Saks Fifth Avenue, Bloomingdale's, Bergdorf Goodman, Von Maur, Nordstrom, as well as many high end specialty stores around the world. After switching from men's shirts to boy's fashion early on in the company's history, they introduced a girl's line of clothing in 2015 under the Andy & Evan brand.

== History ==
Andy Perl & Evan Hakalir both worked at hedge funds until they lost their jobs in the great recession of 2008. It was then that they decided to start Andy & Evan, for which Perl's toddler son was the company's spokesmodel and inspiration.

Andy & Evan began in the men's custom shirt business, but switched to fashion-forward children's clothing after noticing a void in the market for the right kind of product.

Evan Hakalir was appointed President & CEO as of January, 1st 2018.

== Company outlook ==
Andy & Evan looks to promote a dapper look for young boys, with its profile stating they offer their clothing line for "little gentlemen."

== Awards ==
Andy & Evan won Earnshaw Magazine's Earnie Award in 2013, 2014, and 2015 for their innovative style.

"Inc. Magazine", #142 on the 2015 "Inc. 500",
