= Riverchase Galleria =

Coordinates: 33°22′46″N 86°48′31″W

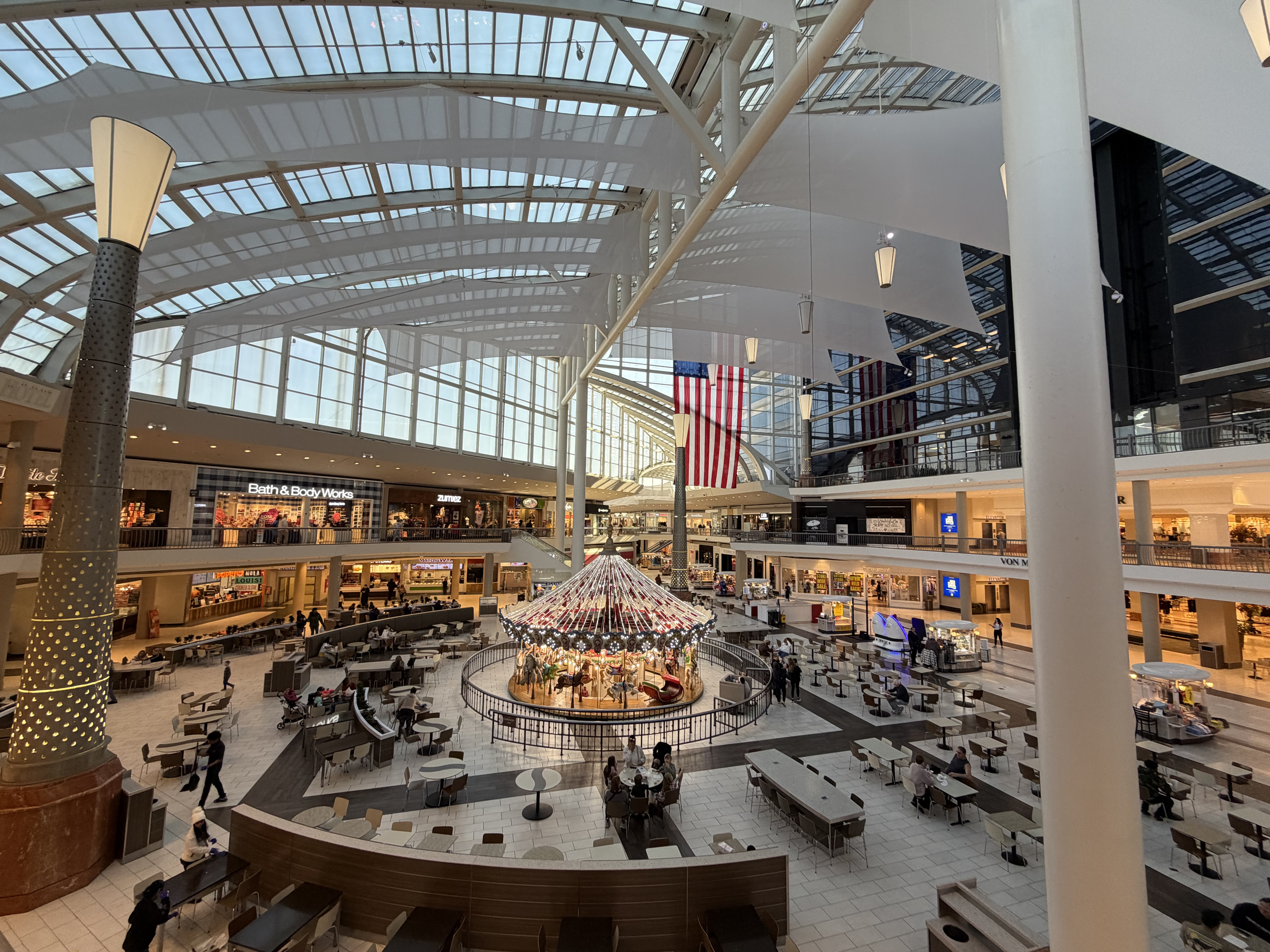
- View of Riverchase Galleria, 2026
- Location: Hoover, Alabama
- Address: 2000 Riverchase Galleria; Hoover, AL 35244
- Opened: February 19, 1986; 40 years ago
- Developer: Jim Wilson & Associates
- Manager: GGP
- Owner: GGP and Jim Wilson & Associates
- Num. of stores: 156
- Num. of anchor tenants: 7 (5 open, 2 vacant)
- Floor area: 1,402,378 square feet (130,285.2 m^{2})
- Floors: 2 ( belk, 3 in center court, Macy's, and Von Maur, 17 in the tower)
- Website: www.riverchasegalleria.com

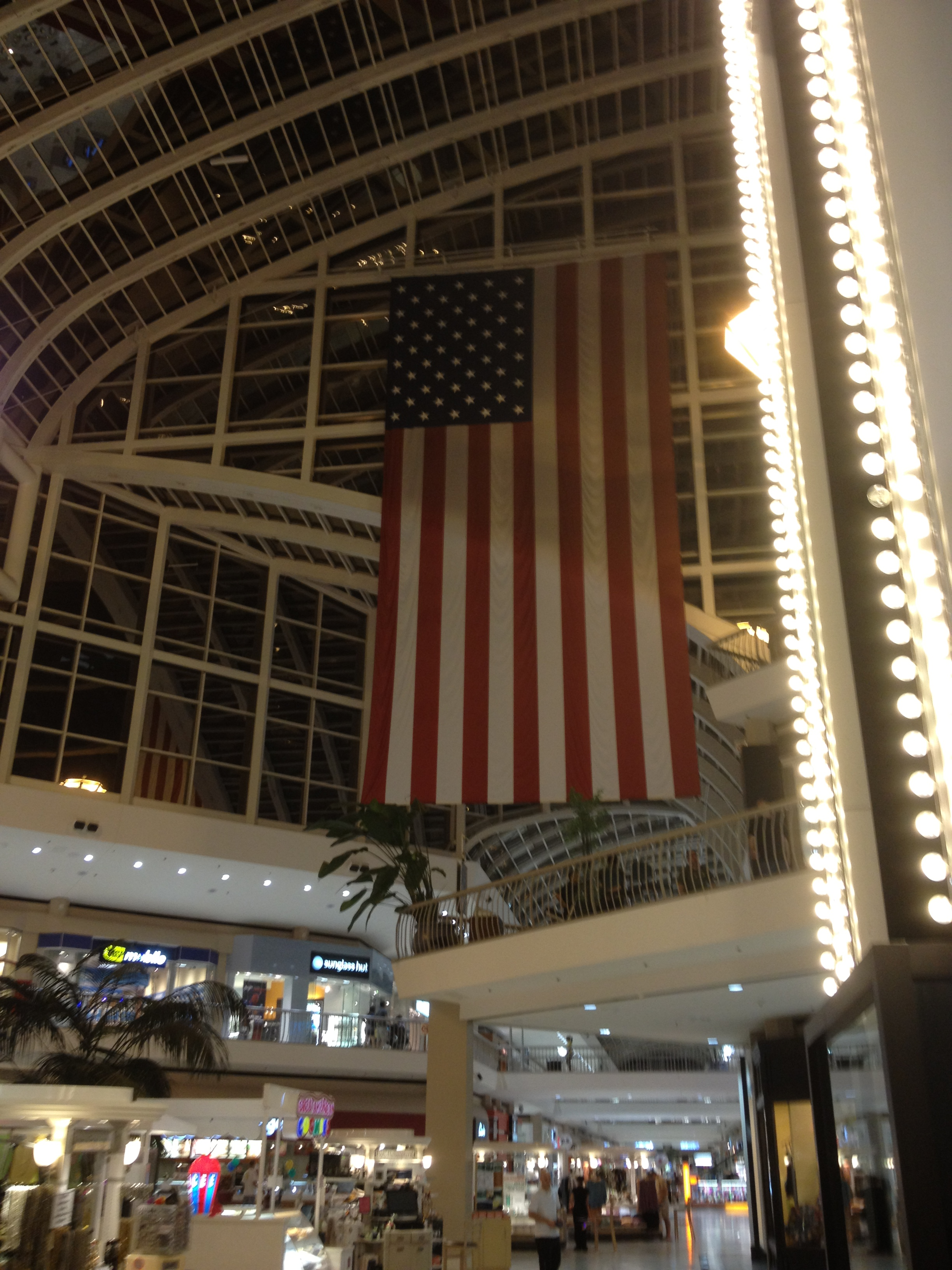
Riverchase Galleria at night, 2012

Riverchase Galleria, locally known as The Galleria, is a large, super–regional shopping mall and mixed use development in Hoover, Alabama, in the Greater Birmingham metropolitan area. It is ranked 43rd on the list of largest shopping malls in the United States. It is the largest enclosed shopping center in Alabama.

Located at the intersection of U.S. Highway 31 (Montgomery Highway) and Interstate 459, the Riverchase Galleria complex includes the region's only Costco, and also includes the 15-story, 1,700,000-square-foot (160,000 m^{2}) Hyatt Regency, and the 17-story, 285,000-square-foot (26,500 m^{2}) Galleria Tower office building. The tower includes the headquarters of Walter Energy, Inc. The mall's anchor stores are JCPenney, Von Maur, Macy's, Belk, and Dave & Buster's. There are two vacant anchor stores which were once Sears and Belk Children's and Home.

== Description ==
The Galleria is anchored by 4 department stores: JCPenney, Belk, Macy's, and Von Maur. The Galleria has two large parking decks, with several entrances, attached to the mall.

Several restaurants are located on out-parcels including J. Alexander's, Stix, and Olive Garden. The Home Depot, FedEx Office, and Costco are located on other out-parcels on the property. There was also a 10-screen Regal Entertainment Group movie theater was on an out-parcel of the property but it was closed in 2006 after the construction of a Rave Motion Pictures (now AMC Theatres) at neighboring Patton Creek Shopping Center. The former movie theater has since been repurposed into an Aveda Salon and Cosmetology school.

== History ==
The Galleria was opened on February 19, 1986, by developer Jim Wilson & Associates, initially 1,200,000 square feet (110,000 m^{2}) with four anchor stores — two Birmingham-based chains, Parisian and Pizitz — along with Atlanta-based Rich's and national retailer J. C. Penney.

In March 1987, the mall added its first Macy's store at center court, the company's first store in Alabama. The same year, the Pizitz chain was acquired by McRae's and subsequently renamed. In 1995, Parisian expanded its store by almost 66%. In 1996, Sears (which relocated from a nearby location) and a new wing were added, making Riverchase Galleria a total of 2,400,000 square feet (220,000 m^{2}) in size. The expansion made it the largest mixed-use project in the Southeastern United States, and one of the 10 largest mixed-use projects in the United States.

In 2003, the Macy's anchor store closed and the Rich's location was renamed Rich's-Macy's. The consolidation came 9 years after Federated Department Stores (the parent of Rich's since 1976) acquired R. H. Macy & Company. Following the closure of the original Macy's location, the store location was sold to Saks Inc., which was the parent of both McRae's and Parisian. Saks kept the north wing anchor space vacant for more than a year before reopening the refurbished store in October 2004 under its Proffitt's division, giving the company 3 different anchors at Riverchase. On March 6, 2005, the Rich's-Macy's store (as Rich's; along with the location at Colonial Brookwood Village) was officially rebranded as Macy's. Later in 2005, Saks sold its Proffitt's division — including most of the McRae's chain — to Belk. As a result, Saks closed the 131,000 sq ft (12,200 m^{2}) McRae's store. Belk dissolved the separate Proffitt's organization, and on March 8, 2006, the Proffitt's store at Riverchase became the mall's first Belk store. In late 2003, Jim Wilson & Associates (JW&A) sold 50% of the Galleria to General Growth Properties (GGP), which assumed management control.

In 2006, Belk acquired the Parisian store chain from Saks, Inc. The former Pizitz/McRae's location simultaneously became available for occupancy. The store had remained vacant since the 2005 closure of McRae's as a result of a lawsuit between the Pizitz family, which had retained ownership of the store real estate after its sale in 1987, and Saks Inc., which inherited the lease obligations of its defunct McRae's operation. As part of its merger of the Parisian stores into its operations, Belk closed its location in the original Macy's space and the Parisian store was renamed to Belk. The upper level of the former Pizitz/McRae's has since been converted to a Belk Home & Children's Store.

On November 30, 2007, Nordstrom announced plans to open its first store in Alabama in the mall in 2012, in the anchor space first occupied by Macy's in 1987, Proffitt's in 2004, and Belk in 2006. but the store was never built after plans were canceled in May 2009.

In July 2009, LEGO opened the first LEGO Brand Retail store in Alabama in the mall. The store occupies 2,061 square feet (191.5 m^{2}) and became one of the 32 LEGO Brand Retail stores nationwide upon its opening.

On August 6, 2019, it was announced that Sears would be closing this location as part of a plan to close 26 stores nationwide. The store closed in October 2019.

In February 2020 the LEGO store closed its location at the Riverchase Galleria. In May 2021, Belk closed its Home and Children location. In January 2022, Macy's announced the closure of its store at Colonial Brookwood Village. Thus, the Galleria was not only the first mall in Alabama with a Macy’s but also the last remaining mall in Alabama with a Macy’s. On August 13, 2024, it was announced that Macy's location is listed for sale.

=== Renovation ===
A $60 million renovation, first planned in 2011, was completed in 2013. The renovation plan, including a $25 million sales tax rebate, was approved by the Hoover City Council on October 17, 2011. As part of the renovation, the first Von Maur in Alabama opened in the space vacated by Macy's/Proffitt's/Belk. The Wynfrey Hotel was renovated and rebranded as a Hyatt hotel, "The Hyatt Regency Birmingham—The Wynfrey Hotel".

In 2013, Belk announced plans to renovate its store at the Galleria, raising it to the level of a flagship location. Dave & Buster's and True Religion both opened at the mall in late 2018.

=== 2018 shooting ===
In November 2018, an altercation resulted in shots being fired and two injured at the Galleria during Black Friday weekend. Following the initial shooting, two officers from the Hoover Police Department approached and shot an alleged suspect, Emantic Fitzgerald Bradford Jr., who died at the scene. Although armed during the altercation, it was later clarified that Bradford was not the shooter. Protests were organized by a Birmingham activist group called Justice League, calling for a boycott of the Galleria.

== Anchor timeline ==
Riverchase Galleria anchors timeline
Decade	1980s				1990s										2000s										2010s										2020s				
Year	6	7	8	9	0	1	2	3	4	5	6	7	8	9	0	1	2	3	4	5	6	7	8	9	0	1	2	3	4	5	6	7	8	9	0	1	2	3	4
Anchor #1 (east wing)	JCPenney (from February 1986)																																						
Anchor #2 (south wing/ east)	Parisian (February 1986 to September 2007; expansion in 1995)																						Belk (from September 2007)																
Anchor #3 (south wing/ west)	Pizitz (February 1986 to fall 1987)		McRae's (from fall 1987 to March 2005)																				Belk Home & Children's Store (upper level; from November 2007 to May 2021)																
Anchor #4 (west wing/ south)	Rich's (February 1986 to March 2005; as Rich's-Macy's, February 2003 to March 2005)																				Macy's (from March 2005)																		
Anchor #5 (north wing)		Macy's (through April 2003)																	Proffitt's (October 2004 to March 2006)		Belk (March 2006 to September 2007)							Von Maur (from November 2013)											
Anchor #6 (west wing/ north)											Sears (from spring 1996 to fall 2019)																												
