= CORS (disambiguation) =

CORS may refer to:

- Corus Bankshares (formerly NASDAQ: CORS), a defunct holding company
- Cross-origin resource sharing, a mechanism in World Wide Web security
- Continuously Operating Reference Station, a network of real-time kinematik (RTK) base stations that broadcast corrections to augment the local accuracy of GNSS (e.g. GPS) readings
