= Brookwood Village =

- Location: Mountain Brook and Homewood, Alabama, United States
- Coordinates: 33.47011°N 86.77084°W
- Opened: 1973; 53 years ago
- Closed: 2022; 4 years ago
- Manager: Cypress Equities
- Owner: Arrow Retail
- Num. of stores: 0 (space for 60)
- Num. of anchor tenants: 0 (space for 2)
- Floor area: 750,754 square feet (69,747.3 m^{2})
- Floors: 2
- Parking: Parking deck

Brookwood Village was a 750,754-square-foot (69,747 m^{2}) shopping mall located near Birmingham in the cities of Mountain Brook and Homewood, Alabama.

== History ==
=== Early history ===
Originally known as Brookwood Mall, it was constructed in 1973 by the Shepherd family. The original building was designed by Giattina Fisher Aycock Architects and won a design award that year from Shopping Center World Magazine. The original anchors were Pizitz and Rich's. Because the mall is located next to a stream bed with weak soil, the foundation for the mall is built in deep piles bearing on rock strata. A feature of the original mall was a large skylit atrium in the center with a large fountain populated with tree-like sprayers that filled the area with white noise and mist.

An interior remodeling in the late 1980s decked over the fountain to create a dining and special events platform. New lighting, escalators and flooring were installed and many shop fronts were upgraded. Pizitz became McRae's during this time.

=== Renaming to Brookwood Village ===
In 1997, Brookwood Mall was purchased for $35 million by Colonial Properties and renamed "Colonial Brookwood Village". Colonial embarked almost immediately on an extensive $50 million overhaul which was completed in 2001. Major additions include a new two-story atrium with a food court on the upper level with a "front entrance" for the mall, facing a new outdoor shopping street, modeled on "lifestyle centers" like the Summit Birmingham. What had been a relatively anonymous interior-facing design was transformed into an attractive outdoor space with a pedestrian bridge over Shades Creek and a shared terrace for two anchor restaurants. This outdoor space also provides outside entrances for several mall tenants, features limited parallel parking, and serves as a valet parking station. The street is also part of a six-mile (10 km) long walking trail which follows Shades Creek from Green Springs Highway to Jemison Park in Mountain Brook.

The enclosed three separate parking areas (East and West 2-level decks and Center Ground Level under the Mall) have been connected by ramps. Faux building facades energize the outer walls of the decks. The redesign was conceptualized by Street-Works, an Arlington, Virginia-based urban design firm. HKW Architects of Birmingham served as architect of record and developed the conceptual designs for construction. Gar Muse of Cooper Carry planned the interiors and contributed to the overall look, drawing from characteristics of the nearby Mountain Brook and Lakeshore communities. Brasfield & Gorrie were general contractors for the revitalization.

Colonial Properties recently added a 9-story office tower on the western end of the mall to house its corporate headquarters as well as additional office and retail space. Further expansion will include a mix of retail, office, residential condos and possibly a hotel.

In 2005, Rich's location was converted to Macy's on March 6 marking Macy's third entry into the Birmingham market. McRae's also became Parisian before becoming Belk in 2007.

=== Building of Colonial Center ===
In February 2006, Colonial Properties went before the Homewood Planning Commission with plans for a new nine-story office tower to be located adjacent to Belk on the west side of the mall. The plans called for 13,000 square feet (1,200 m^{2}) of ground floor specialty retail, a covered walkway connecting the building to Belk, and redundant power feeds from two separate substations to reduce the likelihood of outages. In April, law firm Johnston Barton Proctor & Powell announced that they would be moving from their present offices in downtown Birmingham into 40,000 square feet (4,000 m^{2}) of the new $35.8 million 160,000-square-foot (15,000 m^{2}) office building. Colonial Properties Trust plans to consolidate its Birmingham-area staff of about 150 people into the new building. In June 2014, Surgical Care Affiliates announced that they will be moving into the tower from their current office in Hoover.

=== Decline and closure ===
On July 11, 2017, it was announced that Belk would be closing in January 2018.

In August 2021, Fairway Investments of Birmingham, and Atlanta's Pope & Land Real Estate purchased Brookwood Village for an undisclosed amount. Plans for redevelopment have not been announced.

On January 5, 2022, it was announced that Macy's would close its Brookwood Village location leaving the Riverchase Galleria location as the only store in Alabama. The few remaining tenants closed shortly thereafter and the mall itself was closed to the public.

In 2024, the Homewood Planning Commission approved a preliminary plan for the site to be split into three separate lots, with the former Belk portion of the mall renovated into a medical office building.
