= Taylor, Bean & Whitaker =

Defunct American financial services firm

Taylor, Bean & Whitaker Mortgage Corp.
- Type: Private
- Industry: Finance and Mortgage
- Founded: 1982
- Defunct: August 5, 2009
- Fate: Bankruptcy
- Headquarters: Ocala, Florida
- Key people: Lee Farkas, Chairman; Paul R. Allen, CEO; Ray Bowman, President; Stuart Scott, COO
- Products: Mortgages
- Website: taylorbean.com at the Wayback Machine (archived January 1, 2009)

Taylor, Bean & Whitaker was a wholesale mortgage lending firm in the United States. It was the fifth-largest issuer of Government National Mortgage Association (GNMA) securities.

On August 5, 2009, following a raid by the Special Inspector General of the Troubled Asset Relief Program (SIGTARP) and suspension by the Federal Housing Administration from issuing FHA mortgage loans and Ginnie Mae mortgage-backed securities, it ceased business operations. In April 2011, its majority owner was convicted of 14 counts of securities, bank, and wire fraud and conspiracy to commit fraud, and sentenced to 30 years in federal prison.

Deutsche Bank and BNP Paribas have sued Bank of America, the trustee and collateral agent of Taylor Bean's Ocala subsidiary, for over $1.75 billion in losses stemming from the subsidiary's fraud.

== History ==
Taylor, Bean & Whitaker closed $35 billion in residential mortgage loans in 2007. It employed about 2,000 workers, and was the fifth-largest issuer of Ginnie Mae securities. By 2009, it was servicing more than 500,000 mortgages, including $51.2 billion of Freddie Mac loans.

=== SIGTARP raid, suspension, and closure ===
On August 3, 2009, SIGTARP special agents raided the company's headquarters in Ocala, Florida, in connection with an investigation related to the company's acquisition of a majority stake in Colonial BancGroup, once one of the 25 biggest depository banks in the U.S. Taylor, Bean & Whitaker had signed a deal on March 31, 2009, to become the majority owner of Colonial BancGroup in a $300 million equity stake. On August 4, 2009, the Federal Housing Administration (FHA) suspended the company from issuing FHA mortgage loans and Ginnie Mae mortgage-backed securities.

On August 5, 2009, Taylor, Bean & Whitaker ceased business operations, and terminated all of its approximately 2,000 employees at its headquarters. The company filed for bankruptcy protection on August 24, 2009.

This came soon after the Alabama State Banking Department, as Colonial Bank's regulator, seized the bank and appointed the FDIC as a receiver.

Both companies were brought down by a fraud that started in 2002 involving individuals at both Colonial Bank and Taylor, Bean & Whitaker.

=== Taylor, Bean & Whitaker collapse and bankruptcy ===
After the termination of its 2,000 employees, the entire board of directors of Taylor, Bean & Whitaker resigned. In their stead, two newly appointed independent directors, Bill Maloney and Bruce Layman, operated the company with Neil Luria of Navigant Capital Advisors, who was appointed chief restructuring officer of the company. The Office of Thrift Supervision, Taylor, Bean & Whitaker's government regulator, approved the appointments.

Subsequently, Judge Jerry A. Funk of the United States Bankruptcy Court approved Taylor, Bean & Whitaker's liquidation plan, which created a trust for distribution to Taylor, Bean & Whitaker's creditors: The Taylor, Bean & Whitaker Plan Trust. The Trust is run by Neil Luria.

=== PwC lawsuit ===
The bankruptcy trustee for Taylor, Bean & Whitaker Mortgage Corp., once one of the nation's biggest privately held mortgage companies, is suing PwC as the auditor of Colonial Bank, seeking $5.5 billion in damages. The trustee alleged in the 2013 lawsuit that PricewaterhouseCoopers was negligent in not detecting a massive fraud scheme that brought down Taylor, Bean & Whitaker and helped trigger the 2009 collapse of Colonial Bank, a Montgomery, Alabama bank with $25 billion in assets, one of the biggest U.S. bank collapses during the Great Recession.

PwC has maintained in court documents that its responsibility is to follow accounting principles — which might not necessarily detect fraud. But in a pretrial brief issued by the trustee, former PwC chairman Dennis Nally is quoted in a 2007 Wall Street Journal article saying that the "audit profession has always had a responsibility for the detection of fraud".

=== Ocala Funding; lawsuit by Deutsche Bank and BNP Paribas ===
In 2005, Taylor Bean created and then subsequently operated a special-purpose entity subsidiary, Ocala Funding. Ocala was a conduit which purchased its home loans, and bundled them into securities which it then sold to Freddie Mac and other investors. It funded the mortgage loan business by selling $1.75 billion of worthless asset-backed commercial paper short-term notes to Deutsche Bank and the mortgage subsidiary of BNP Paribas. Deutsche Bank bought about $1.2 billion of the notes, and BNP had purchased about $480.7 million in the notes.

Ocala hired Bank of America as both its trustee and collateral agent for the Ocala commercial paper. Prosecutors said that Ocala Funding engaged in what they stated was one of the largest bank frauds in United States history.

In litigation unrelated to the Taylor, Bean & Whitaker Plan Trust, Deutsche Bank and BNP Paribas sued Bank of America over the $1.75 billion in losses stemming from the fraud, saying their agreements required that Ocala hold $1.6 billion in cash or mortgage loans as collateral to be deposited with Bank of America, and that Bank of America breached its custodial and trustee obligations when it accepted Ocala's request to improperly transfer billions of dollars of funds that were meant to be serving as collateral.

The case was heard by Judge Robert Sweet in the United States District Court for the Southern District of New York. Sweet allowed some of the case to proceed in March 2011, writing that Deutsche Bank and BNP Paribas had stated a "plausible claim" against Bank of America.

In June 2012, Judge Sweet dismissed a counter-suit by Bank of America Corp. against the securities units of BNP Paribas and Deutsche Bank, alleging negligence and breach of fiduciary duty on their behalf for their role in the sale of notes issued by Ocala Funding. Sweet held that the units, acting as brokers in the sale of the Ocala notes, owed "no duty ... to investigate or verify representations" made in a private placement. This lawsuit was settled in April 2015.

=== Convictions ===
Six individuals have pled guilty for their roles in the fraudulent scheme.

On April 19, 2011, a federal jury in Alexandria, Virginia, convicted Lee Farkas, the majority owner of the company, of 14 counts of securities fraud, bank fraud, and wire fraud and conspiracy to commit fraud. According to the government case, the multibillion-dollar fraud caused the downfall of Colonial Bank and cheated investors and the government. The fraud began in 2002 when Taylor overdrew its account with Colonial BancGroup by several million dollars. Taylor Bean then promised to cover the amount by the end of the day in a process known as sweeping. When the overdrafts grew to over $100 million, mid-level Taylor Bean executives sold Colonial BancGroup $1 billion in mortgages that it did not own. Farkas and his co-conspirators caused Colonial BancGroup to file materially false financial data with the SEC regarding its assets in annual reports contained in Forms 10-K and quarterly filings contained Forms 10-Q. Colonial BancGroup's materially false financial data included overstated assets for mortgage loans that had little to no value.

During his sentencing hearing on June 30, 2011, Farkas read a statement saying that he "strived to be a good person." However, Federal District Judge Leonie Brinkema replied that she did not observe any genuine remorse, and sentenced Farkas to 30 years in federal prison. In 2012, federal appellate court upheld his convictions and sentence. Farkas was installed at low-security FCI Coleman.

In 2013, Farkas asked a federal judge to set aside his convictions and prison sentence, arguing that his trial and appellate lawyers provided ineffective assistance, and that his trial lawyers should have sought a judgment of acquittal because the evidence against him was insufficient. In a 2014 prison interview, Farkas stated he gets "depressed a lot of days", has lost 43 pounds and most of his friends. Judge Brinkema released him on 29 September 2020 after serving only 9 years of his 30-year sentence, stating that Farkas could catch the COVID-19 virus is prison. When met with opposition from the prosecution, Brinkema stated in her decision that she wasn't "at all concerned about the interests of justice not being served."

Paul Allen, the former chief executive and lead manager for Ocala Funding, admitted to allowing $1.5 billion in collateral to be misappropriated from Ocala and was sentenced in 2011 to 40 months in prison, followed by two years of supervised release). Desiree E. Brown and Raymond Bowman, former treasurer and president of TBW, respectively, pled guilty and were sentenced to 72 months and 30 months. Brown cooperated in the case against Farkas and other executives received sentences ranging from three months (senior financial analyst Sean Ragland) to eight years (Catherine Kissick, senior vice president and head of the Mortgage Warehouse Loan Division at Colonial Bank).
