= Jordan Creek Town Center =

- Location: West Des Moines, Iowa, United States
- Coordinates: 41.5696426°N 93.8045509°W
- Opened: August 4, 2004; 22 years ago
- Developer: General Growth Properties
- Manager: GGP
- Owner: GGP
- Num. of stores: 150
- Num. of anchor tenants: 12
- Floor area: 2,000,000 sq ft (190,000 m^{2})
- Floors: 2
- Parking: 8,900 spaces
- Public transit: DART
- Website: jordancreektowncenter.com

Jordan Creek Town Center is a shopping mall in the city of West Des Moines, Iowa. It is the largest shopping complex in the state of Iowa with a total gross leasable area of 1,340,000 square feet (124,000 m^{2}). It is also the fourth largest shopping complex in the Midwest, and the 24th largest shopping complex in the United States. The center is named after Jordan Creek, a tributary of the Raccoon River that was named after James Cunningham Jordan, the first person to settle in what is now West Des Moines. The mall's anchor stores are Century Theatres, Dillard's, Von Maur, and Scheels All Sports and includes the only Apple Store in Iowa.

== History ==
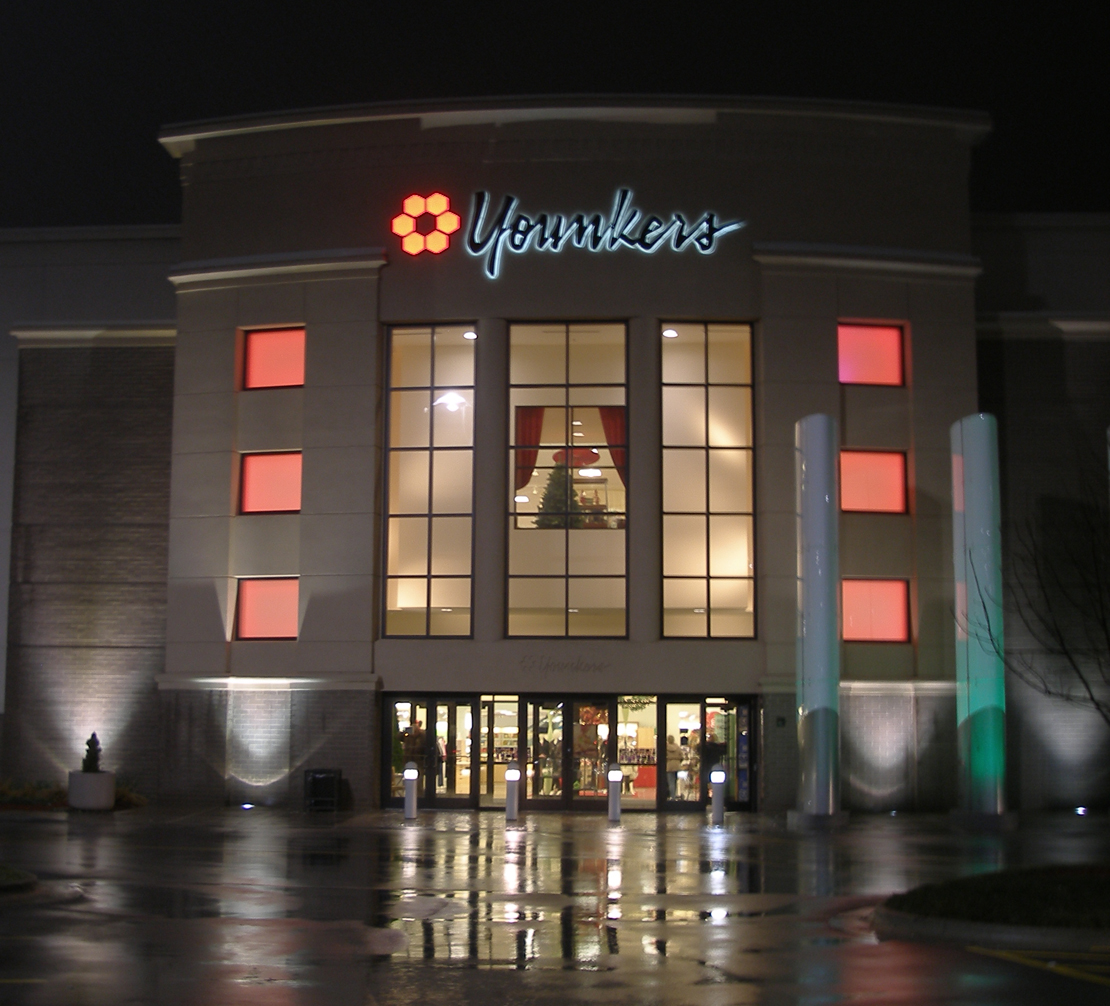
Former Younkers store

=== Proposal 1995 – 2004 ===
Around 1995, the family of local businessman Art Wittern proposed the "Village at Oakbrook" to the city of West Des Moines on the 200-acre (0.81 km^{2}) site that the Witterns owned at 74th Street (later renamed Jordan Creek Parkway) and E.P. True Parkway. The village would have contained a mixture of commercial, residential, and office development that was intended to attract upscale retailers similar to those at Country Club Plaza in Kansas City. In 1999, following the success of Coral Ridge Mall in eastern Iowa, General Growth Properties chose the Wittern site for its proposed "town center" concept.

General Growth unveiled plans for Jordan Creek Town Center in May 2000. Two of the Des Moines metropolitan area's existing malls, Merle Hay Mall and Valley West Mall, promptly sued the city of West Des Moines, claiming that it was illegal to use public money from tax increment financing to make improvements around the mall. The Iowa Supreme Court dismissed the lawsuit on February 27, 2002, allowing construction of the $200 million complex to begin later that year.

=== 2004 – present ===
Jordan Creek Town Center opened on August 4, 2004, attracting nearly 17 million shoppers in its first year. Jordan Creek led to short-term sales declines at the three existing regional malls in the Des Moines area (Merle Hay, Valley West, and Southridge) while accounting for nearly 37 percent of taxable sales at the four malls during the last three months of 2004. Jordan Creek also affected sales tax revenues in Dallas County, which jumped from $16.7 million in fiscal 2004 to $33.7 million in fiscal 2006. It has also spawned other new commercial developments in West Des Moines such as the West Glen Town Center near Interstate 35 and a new Wells Fargo office complex south of the mall.

In May 2007, Iowa State University economists David Swenson and Liesl Eathington released a study showing that retail sales in the Dallas County portion of West Des Moines had increased by over $310 million, or 503.7 percent, during Jordan Creek's first two years of operation. At the same time, sales in the city of Des Moines decreased by nearly $194 million (5.2 percent) while sales in the Polk County portion of West Des Moines decreased by $22 million (2.4 percent). Smaller Dallas County cities like Adel and Perry also experienced declines in retail sales during this period.

In February 2018, Iowa-based department store Von Maur announced it would construct a new location at the mall, with a planned opening in 2022. In April 2018, the parent company to the mall's Younkers department store announced it would cease operations and close all stores. The Jordan Creek store closed on August 29, 2018.

On June 10, 2021, a 2-story H&M opened right next to the main atrium. On November 5, 2022, Von Maur opened in the former Younkers location.
