= Mid-America Apartment Communities =

American real estate investment trust

Mid-America Apartment Communities, Inc.
- Type: Public
- Traded as: NYSE: MAA; S&P 500 component
- Industry: Real estate investment trust
- Founded: 1977; 49 years ago
- Founder: George E. Cates
- Headquarters: Germantown, Tennessee, U.S.
- Key people: A. Bradley Hill (CEO & President); Clay Holder (CFO)
- Products: Apartments
- Revenue: ▲US$2.21 billion (2025)
- Net income: ▼US$447 million (2025)
- Total assets: ▲US$12.0 billion (2025)
- Total equity: ▼US$5.66 billion (2025)
- Number of employees: 2,532 (2024)
- Website: maac.com

Mid-America Apartment Communities, Inc. (MAA) is a publicly traded real estate investment trust based in Memphis, Tennessee that invests in apartments in the Southeastern United States and the Southwestern United States.

As of December 31, 2024, the company owned 301 apartment communities containing 102,348 apartment units. It is the second largest owner of apartments in the United States and the 12th largest apartment property manager in the United States.

The company is ranked 1785th on the Forbes Global 2000.

== History ==
The company was founded as The Cates Co. in 1977 by George E. Cates.

In 1993, the company was organized as a real estate investment trust.

In February 1994, the company acquired The Cates Company from George E. Cates and became a public company via an initial public offering.

In March 2009, founder George E. Cates retired.

In October 2013, the company acquired Colonial Properties.

In December 2016, the company acquired Post Properties.

In November 2018, the company paid $11.3 million to settle a complaint that Post Properties violated the design and construction requirements under the Fair Housing Act and the Americans with Disabilities Act at 50 properties.

In January 2023, the company was named a defendant in a class-action lawsuit over its use of RealPage software to control rent pricing. The lawsuit was settled in January 2026.
