= Post Properties =

Post Properties, Inc.
- Industry: Apartments
- Founded: 1971; 55 years ago
- Defunct: December 1, 2016; 9 years ago
- Fate: Acquired by Mid-America Apartment Communities
- Headquarters: Atlanta, Georgia
- Key people: David Stockert, President & CEO
- Revenue: $0.384 billion (2015)
- Net income: $0.080 billion (2015)
- Total assets: $2.271 billion (2015)
- Total equity: $1.243 billion (2015)
- Number of employees: 650 (2015)

Post Properties, Inc. was a publicly traded real estate investment trust headquartered in Atlanta, Georgia that invested in apartments. As of December 31, 2015, the company owned interests in 24,162 apartment units in 61 communities. In 2016, the company was acquired by Mid-America Apartment Communities.

== History ==
The company was founded in 1970 by John A. Williams (1943–2018) and Douglas Bates.

On July 15, 1993, the company became a public company via an initial public offering.

While the company initially developed garden-style apartments, it shifted its focus to mixed-use infill developments in 1998.

In 1997, the company acquired Columbus Realty Trust, which owned 7,526 apartment units, in a $600 million transaction.

In January 2001, David Stockert was named president and chief operating officer of the company.

In 2002, founder John A. Williams resigned as CEO of the company. In 2004, he resigned from the board of directors of the company after losing a proxy battle.

In early 2016, the company went through a re brand effort with updated signage and marketing material. At this time it also unveiled separate logos for Post Eco-Active and Post Hope, an eco effort for communities and its non-profit branch, respectively.

In December 2016, the company was acquired by Mid-America Apartment Communities.
