= Southridge Plaza =

Shopping center in Iowa, U.S.

Coordinates: 41°31.3166′N 93°36.1166′W

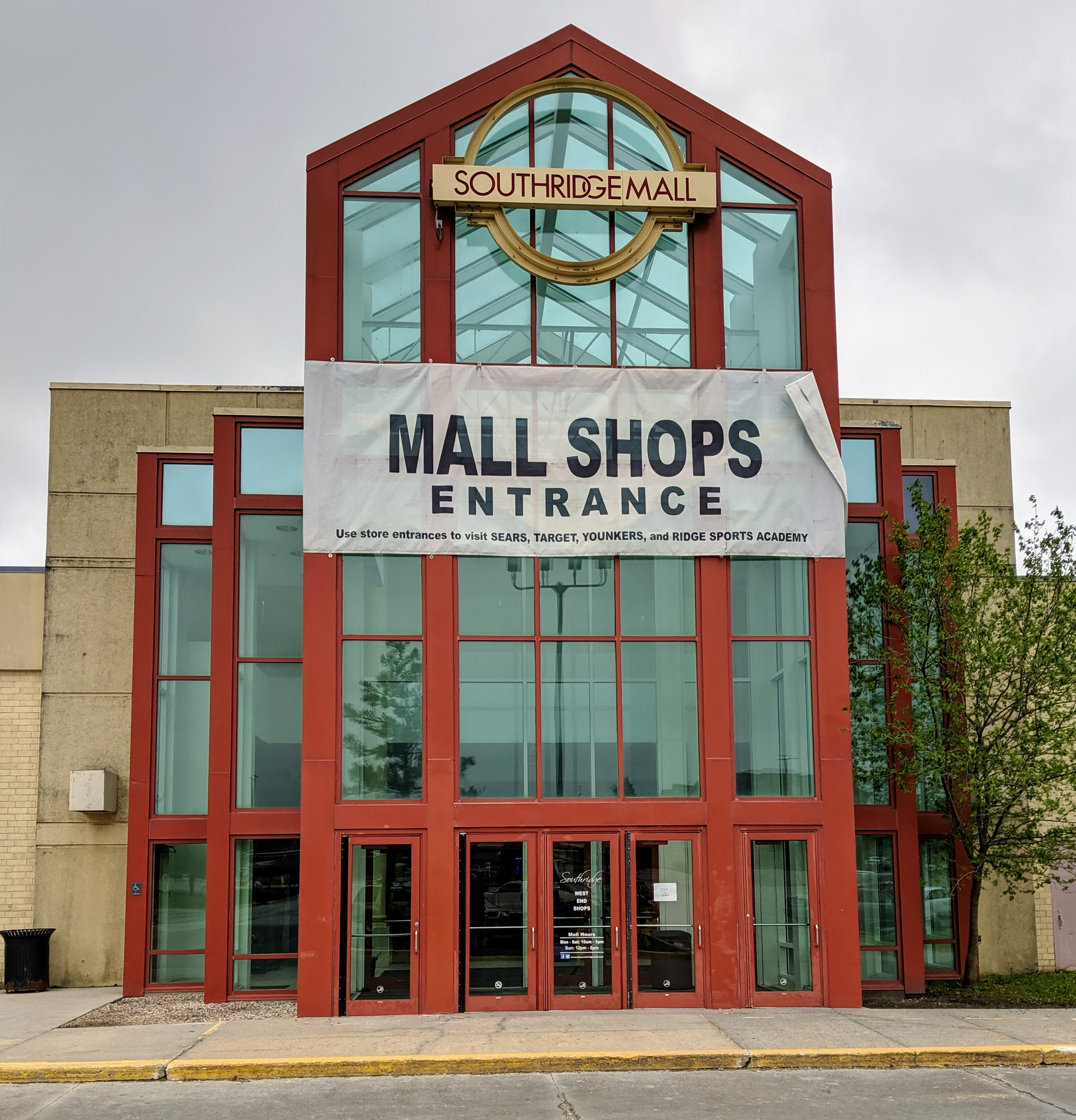
- Entrance to Southridge Plaza, 2019
- Location: Des Moines, Iowa, United States
- Opened: October 15, 1975; 51 years ago (original indoor mall) 2012 (current open-air shopping center)
- Closed: 2012 (original indoor mall)
- Developer: General Growth Properties
- Manager: Travis Mansfield
- Owner: Native Real Estate LLC
- Num. of stores: 46 (as of summer 2011)
- Num. of anchor tenants: 7
- Floor area: 869,390 sq ft (80,769 m^{2})
- Floors: 1
- Public transit: DART

Southridge Plaza is an open-air shopping center on the south side of Des Moines, Iowa, United States. It attracts roughly 300 visitors per year, with a primary trade area consisting of most of the city of Des Moines and areas to its south and east.

The mall's anchor stores are Target, Marshalls, Shoe Carnival, Genesis Health Clubs, NativeBid Auctions, Ross Dress for Less, and a community college known as Des Moines Area Community College Southridge Center (DMACC). Tenants on the outparcels include Hy-Vee, and Petco.

== History ==
On March 6, 1972, General Growth Properties announced plans to build a new mall at the intersection of Southeast 14th Street and Army Post Road. The mall was known as Army Post Plaza during the planning and construction stages, but it was renamed Southridge Mall shortly before construction was completed.

Southridge Mall opened on October 15, 1975, two months after Valley West Mall opened in West Des Moines. Younkers was the first anchor to open, with Sears following in 1977. An expansion in 1978 added Montgomery Ward as a third anchor, while a Richman Gordman department store became the mall's fourth anchor in 1982. Plans to add Dillard's to Southridge in 1987 were immediately opposed by Younkers, who claimed that the store's lease limited Southridge to four department stores. Younkers sued Southridge's management over this issue, but a federal magistrate ruled against Younkers in June 1990 even though Dillard's backed out of its plan to build at Southridge before the ruling. After the failure to attract Dillard's, Target became the mall's fifth anchor in 1992 while the rest of the mall was renovated; the expansion increased Southridge's floor space to just over 1 million square feet (93,000 m^{2}). Richman Gordman closed in 1992 after the chain declared bankruptcy, and JCPenney moved from downtown Des Moines to Southridge two years later to replace that anchor spot. Montgomery Ward closed its stores at Southridge and Merle Hay Malls during that chain's first round of bankruptcy in 1999, and Wards' 109,000-square foot (10,100 m^{2}) space at Southridge remained vacant until it was demolished in April 2006. On January 24, 2011, it was announced that JCPenney would close its store in June 2011, though one JCPenney store in Des Moines at Valley West Mall would remain open.

General Growth Properties, which was originally based in Des Moines, sold Southridge to the Equitable Life Assurance Society in 1984 as part of its real estate investment trust liquidation that year. General Growth continued to manage Southridge until a partnership of the Simon Property Group and Macerich acquired the mall in March 1998 as part of a 12-mall deal. Macerich manages the mall as part of the deal.

The occupancy rate at Southridge declined in the 2000s, as competition from Jordan Creek Town Center and other shopping areas such as Merle Hay Mall affected the mall's business. Renovation work in late 2006 and 2007 resulted in a new children's play area in the food court, Wi-Fi access, new seating areas, and remodeled restrooms. Steve & Barry's opened a new 31,000-square-foot (2,900 m^{2}) store near JCPenney on October 24, 2007, but that store closed at the end of 2008 as the chain liquidated its remaining stores. By December 2009, 40 out of 91 inline store spaces were reported as vacant. Some of the empty storefronts at Southridge had been filled with tenants that are not usually associated with malls, such as churches, offices and an animal shelter. In 2009, U.S. News & World Report named Southridge as one of 84 "endangered malls" due to its low sales per square foot and vacancy rate.

In 2012, Macerich conducted a $35 million renovation of the property, which invovled demolishing 296,000 square feet (27,500 m^{2}) of enclosed space between Sears and Target. The mall was converted to an open-air shopping center with a courtyard. The new layout was unveiled in a ceremony on November 10.

On May 3, 2016, Sears announced its closure in August 2016. On April 18, 2018, Younkers announced that they would close its location, as the parent, Bon-Ton Stores, was going out of business. The store closed on August 29, 2018.

In 2020, a Kansas-based health club known as Genesis Health Clubs proposed to convert the site of the former Sears store into an athletic club and multisports facility with a focus on basketball. The estimated $13.5 million project opened on September 17, 2024, and included space for gym weights, cardio equipment and basketball courts. A later expansion added space for soccer, athletic training and a swimming pool. The facility is 105,000 square feet (9754.8 m^{2)}.

In May 2021, NativeBid Auction Services leased the former Younkers building to open an auction house specializing in liquidated items, customer returns, and overstock merchandise from major retailers. In 2024, NativeBid owner Travis Mansfield purchased the 150,000-square-foot (14,000 m^{2}) interior of the mall, the Plaza shops, and other out lots from Macerich for a total of $4 million.

In late 2022, development began on an 90-unit affordable housing in the form of apartments on the west side of the mall grounds. This was developed as part of a $13.7 million affordable housing project. The apartments were to be 3 stories situated on 4.4 acres of land that used to be the Montgomery Wards department store. Construction broke ground in 2023, and the apartments were completed by 2025.

== Renovations ==
In 2012, renovations began on converting most of the mall to outdoor-facing retail. 296,000 square feet of retail space was demolished in the process, with Foot Locker, Shoe Carnival, T-Mobile and Rue 21 opening in the outdoor segment that replaced it. Des Moines Area Community College has also expressed interest in opening a campus in the former JCPenney building. Marshalls opened in the outdoor section in 2013, while a consignment shop called Value Villa opened in the former Steve & Barry's. A college known as Des Moines Area Community College (DMACC) also replaced the former JCPenney.
