= Colonial Bancgroup =

Defunct bank headquartered in Alabama

Colonial BancGroup

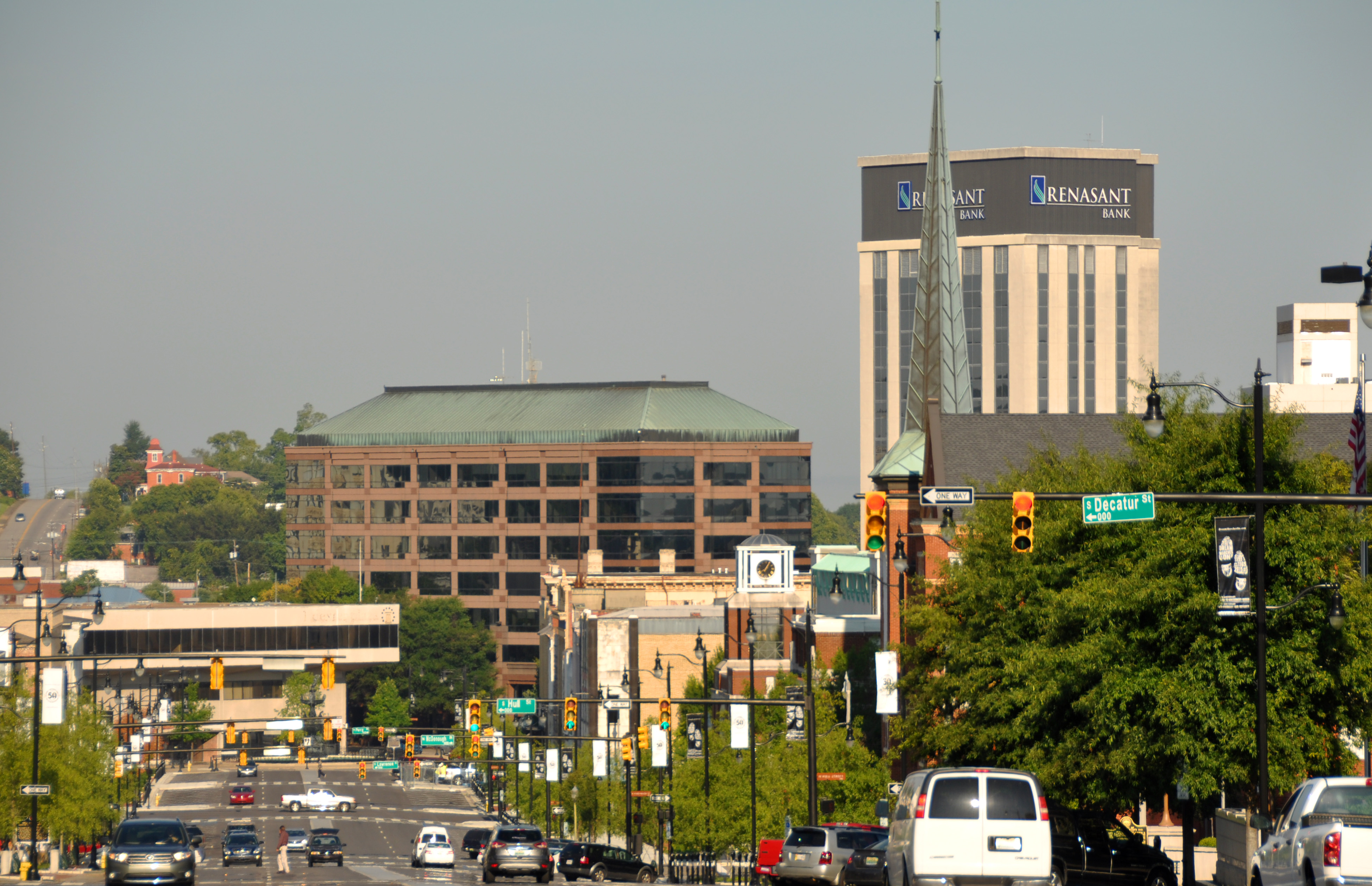
- The Colonial Financial Center (center) in downtown Montgomery
- Formerly: Bank: Exchange National Bank of Montgomery (1974–1982); Holding Company: Southland Bancorporation (1974–1981)
- Type: Holding company
- Industry: Financial Services
- Founded: 1974; 52 years ago
- Founder: Bobby Lowder
- Defunct: August 14, 2009; 17 years ago
- Fate: Banking assets seized by FDIC and later sold to BB&T
- Successor: BB&T (Note: BB&T subsequently sold the Nevada branches to U.S. Bank.) (now Truist)
- Headquarters: Montgomery, Alabama
- Number of locations: 346 (2009)
- Area served: Alabama, Georgia, Florida, Nevada, Texas
- Total assets: $26 billion
- Number of employees: <10,000
- Website: colonialbank.com

Colonial BancGroup Inc. was a bank holding company headquartered in Montgomery, Alabama, United States that failed in 2009. It was a financial services company that, through its subsidiaries, provided diversified services, including retail and commercial banking, wealth management services, mortgage banking and insurance. The company was in the top 50 largest banks in the US prior to its failure and its subsidiary, Colonial Bank, operated 346 branches in the states of Alabama, Georgia, Florida, Nevada and Texas. On August 25, 2009 it filed for Chapter 11 bankruptcy. The banking assets and branches were sold to BB&T under a Federal Deposit Insurance Corporation (FDIC) brokered deal.

== History ==
=== Foundation and Expansion ===
The Bank was founded in 1974 in Montgomery, Alabama as Southland Bancorporation. The company changed its name to The Colonial BancGroup, Inc. in 1981. Colonial Bank was established in 1981 as part of Colonial BancGroup's relocation to Montgomery from Mobile. The Montgomery bank was formed from the Exchange National Bank of Montgomery, which—like the other banks owned by Colonial—was owned by Bobby Lowder. Colonial became an aggressive buyer of other Alabama banks in the 1980s; by 1985, with its merger with the Bank of Oxford, it operated in all major metropolitan areas of the state and had $750 million in assets. That year, it broke ground on a new headquarters for the bank, the holding company, and Colonial Broadcasting (which owned WLWI-AM-FM radio), the Colonial Financial Center.

In 1987, Colonial intended to enter the Florida Panhandle by buying Liberty Bank of Pensacola on the first day a new Alabama interstate banking law took effect, but this never occurred. Branches were added in Tennessee as part of its purchase of First AmFed of Huntsville in 1993; by this time, through a series of acquisitions of smaller banks, Colonial was the fifth-largest bank holding company in the state. With the purchase of First AmFed and United Savings Bank of Anniston, Colonial ended the year with 96 branches in Alabama and Tennessee.

Colonial debuted in Georgia and Florida simultaneously in 1996 after purchasing Southern Bank of Orlando, the Atlanta-based Commercial Bank of Georgia, and Dothan Federal Savings Bank. In the year from July 1996 to July 1997, Colonial acquired seven Florida banks; it then consolidated all of its separate banks into one, chartered in Alabama, with 181 branches and $6 billion in assets.

With a mortgage operation servicing customers in 45 states, Colonial also added assets outside the Southeast, such as the Las Vegas-based Commercial Bank and FirstBank of Dallas in 1998. However, poor financial performance led to cost-cutting measures by year's end. The number of branches had increased to 263 by 2002.

On January 31, 2006, Colonial Bank sold its interest in Goldleaf Technologies, Inc., which provides Internet and automated clearing house services to community banks.

Colonial's assets had grown from $166 million in 1981 to $26 billion. Colonial expanded from its base of Alabama to fast-growing regional markets such as Florida, Georgia, Texas, and Nevada. Colonial Bank was the fifth-largest commercial bank in Florida and 27th-largest commercial bank in the USA. Colonial Bank was frequently the target of rumors that it would be acquired by a larger bank.

At the end of the fourth quarter of 2008, Colonial Bancgroup had a Texas ratio of 53.4%, up from a figure of 25% in the first quarter of 2008.

The principal activity of the BancGroup was to supervise and coordinate the business of its subsidiaries, and to provide them with capital and services. The BancGroup derived substantially all of its income from dividends received from Colonial Bank, its banking subsidiary. The BancGroup's subsidiary Colonial Brokerage, Inc. provided full service and discount brokerage services and investment advice. The BancGroup had interests in several residential and commercial real estate developments located in the southeastern United States, as well as two in the central Texas area.

=== Demise and Failure ===
The bank ran into problems in the late 2000s after it was revealed that it had bought over $1 billion in mortgages from Taylor, Bean & Whitaker that Taylor Bean did not own in one of the biggest fraud cases in history. The CEO of Taylor, Bean & Whitaker, Lee Farkas, was put on trial and found guilty of fraud. Bobby Lowder, the CEO of Colonial Bank, was investigated and was found not involved with the fraud.

Between 2002 and 2009, Catherine Kissick, former senior vice president of Colonial Bank and head of Colonial Bank's Mortgage Warehouse Lending Division, and her co-conspirators, including former Taylor, Bean & Whitaker Chairman Lee Farkas, engaged in a scheme to defraud various entities and individuals, including Colonial Bank, Colonial BancGroup, Taylor, Bean & Whitaker, the Troubled Asset Relief Program, and the investing public.

According to court documents, Taylor, Bean & Whitaker began running overdrafts in its master bank account at Colonial Bank. Starting in 2002, Kissick, Farkas and their co-conspirators engaged in a series of fraudulent actions to cover up the overdrafts, first by sweeping overnight money from one Taylor, Bean & Whitaker account with excess in another, and later through the fictitious "sales" of mortgage loans to Colonial Bank, a fraud the conspirators dubbed "Plan B". The conspirators accomplished "Plan B" by selling Colonial Bank mortgage loans that did not exist or that Taylor, Bean & Whitaker had already committed or sold to other third-party investors.

Kissick admitted she knew and understood she and her co-conspirators had caused Colonial Bank to pay Taylor, Bean & Whitaker for assets that were worthless to the bank. As a result, false information was entered on Colonial Bank's books and records, giving the appearance that the bank owned interests in legitimate pools of mortgage loans when in fact the pools had no value and could not be securitized or sold.

The fraud caused Colonial BancGroup to file materially false financial data with the SEC regarding its assets in annual reports contained in Forms 10-K and quarterly filings contained in Forms 10-Q. Colonial BancGroup's materially false financial data included overstated assets for mortgage loans that had little to no value.

Colonial disclosed its legal problems on August 4, 2009, stating that federal agents had executed a search warrant at its mortgage warehouse lending offices in Orlando, Florida, and that it had been forced to sign a cease and desist order with the Federal Reserve and regulators in relation to its accounting practices and its recognition of losses.

On August 14, 2009, the bank failed and its 346 branches were seized by regulators. It was later announced that BB&T would buy Colonial's branches and $22 billion of the bank's deposits in a deal with the FDIC. The bank's failure was the largest bank failure in 2009 and the sixth-largest bank ever to fail in the United States, costing the FDIC's Deposit Insurance Fund an estimated $2.8 billion. It was also the 74th bank failure of 2009.

On August 25 Colonial BancGroup filed for Chapter 11 bankruptcy. The bankruptcy case's name is "In re Colonial BancGroup Inc, U.S. Bankruptcy Court, Middle District of Alabama (Montgomery), No. 09-32303".

== Controversies ==
=== Taylor, Bean & Whitaker Mortgage fraud ===
Between 2004 and 2009 management at Taylor, Bean & Whitaker fraudulently sold $400 million worth of fake mortgages to Colonial with the help of a Colonial bank executive. The fraud scheme was between 2002 and 2009, and involved Catherine Kissick, former senior vice president of Colonial Bank and head of Colonial Bank's Mortgage Warehouse Lending Division, and her co-conspirators, including former Taylor, Bean & Whitaker Chairman Lee Farkas, whereby they defrauded various entities and individuals, including Colonial Bank, Colonial BancGroup, Taylor, Bean & Whitaker, the Troubled Asset Relief Program, and the investing public.

According to court documents, Taylor, Bean & Whitaker began running overdrafts in its master bank account at Colonial Bank. Starting in 2002, Kissick, Farkas and their co-conspirators engaged in a series of fraudulent actions to cover up the overdrafts, first by sweeping overnight money from one Taylor, Bean & Whitaker account with excess in another, and later through the fictitious "sales" of mortgage loans to Colonial Bank, a fraud the conspirators dubbed "Plan B." Court records show the conspirators sent mortgage data to Colonial Bank for loans that didn't exist or that Taylor, Bean & Whitaker had already committed or sold to other third-party investors.

Kissick admitted she knew and understood she and her co-conspirators had caused Colonial Bank to pay Taylor, Bean & Whitaker for assets that were worthless to the bank. As a result, false information was entered on Colonial Bank's books and records, giving the appearance that the bank owned interests in legitimate pools of mortgage loans when in fact the pools had no value and could not be securitized or sold.

The fraud caused Colonial BancGroup to file materially false financial data with the SEC regarding its assets in annual reports contained in Forms 10-K and quarterly filings contained in Forms 10-Q. Colonial BancGroup's materially false financial data included overstated assets for mortgage loans that had little to no value.

The fraud in total would cost Colonial over $1.9 billion.

=== PwC lawsuit ===
The bankruptcy trustee for Taylor, Bean & Whitaker Mortgage Corp., once one of the nation’s biggest privately held mortgage companies, is suing PwC as the auditor of Colonial Bank, seeking $5.5 billion in damages. The trustee alleged in the 2013 suit that PwC was negligent in not detecting a massive fraud scheme that brought down Taylor, Bean & Whitaker, which led to the 2009 collapse of Colonial Bank, a Montgomery, Ala. bank with $25 billion in assets, one of the biggest U.S. bank collapses during the Great Recession.

The closely watched case could lead to billions of dollars in damages depending on how a jury answers a fundamental question in accounting: How much responsibility do auditors have for catching fraud? The suit has since been settled for an undisclosed sum in August 2016.

PwC has maintained in court documents that its responsibility is to follow accounting principles — which might not necessarily detect fraud. But in a pretrial brief issued by the trustee, former PricewaterhouseCoopers chairman Dennis Nally is quoted in a 2007 Wall Street Journal article saying that the "audit profession has always had a responsibility for the detection of fraud".

On December 28, 2017, a Federal judge ruled PwC was liable.

On March 15, 2019, the Federal Deposit Insurance Corporation (FDIC), as receiver for Colonial Bank, announced a $335 million settlement with PwC related to professional negligence claims brought by the FDIC against PwC arising out of the inadequate audits of the failed Colonial Bank.
