= Corus Bankshares =

Bank holding company in the United States

Corus Bankshares Inc.
- Type: Public
- Traded as: Nasdaq: CORSQ
- Headquarters: Chicago, Illinois, United States
- Key people: Robert J. Glickman
- Number of employees: 520
- Website: www.corusbank.com
- Footnotes; Datasource: ZenoBank

Corus Bankshares, Inc. operated as the holding company for Corus Bank, N.A., a United States company that offered consumer and corporate banking products and services.

== Corus Bank ==
The bank's deposit products included checking, savings, money market, and time deposit accounts. Its loan portfolio primarily comprised commercial real estate loans, including condominium construction and condominium conversion loans; commercial loans; and residential real estate loans. The bank focused its lending activities in various metropolitan areas in Florida and California, as well as in Las Vegas, New York City, and Washington, D.C. It also provides safe deposit boxes, as well as clearing, depository, and credit services to check cashing industry locations in the Chicago area and in Milwaukee, Wisconsin. As of December 31, 2006, the bank operated 11 retail banking branches in the Chicago metropolitan area. Corus Bankshares was founded in 1958 and is based in Chicago, Illinois. Corus Bank is also known for having a relatively few number of branches for a publicly traded stock.

As of the end of the first quarter of 2008, Corus had a Texas ratio of 70%.

== Financial crisis ==
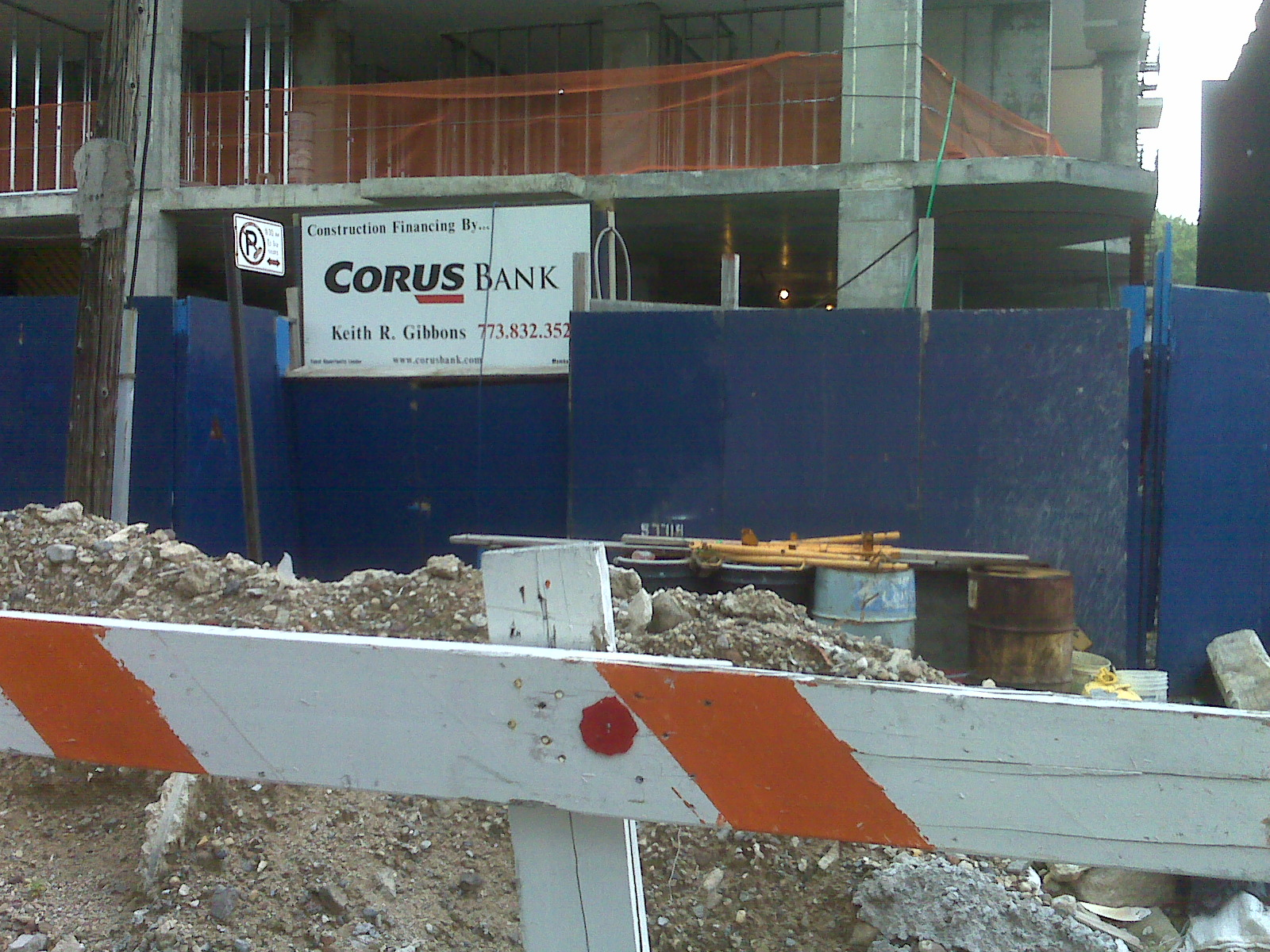
Corus Bank sign at development site located at 23 Caton Place in Kensington, Brooklyn.

As of August 1, 2009, Corus reported that it was "highly undercapitalized" and in need of government assistance. At the end of the previous quarter, its Tier 1 capital had fallen to negative $157 million. Normally, banks with negative Tier 1 capital are immediately closed by the Federal Deposit Insurance Corporation (FDIC).

In mid-August 2009 the bank was named as one of the biggest of more than 150 U.S. lenders which own nonperforming loans that equal 5 percent or more of their holdings. 5 percent is a threshold that former regulators have stated can wipe out a bank's equity and threaten its survival.

On September 11, 2009, Corus Bank, N.A., Chicago, IL was closed by the Office of the Comptroller of the Currency, and the FDIC was named Receiver. MB Financial Bank of Chicago, Illinois assumed all deposits and approximately $3 billion of assets making all depositors of Corus Bank customers of MB Financial. The FDIC estimates the cost to the Deposit Insurance Fund will be $1.7 billion. A month later, Starwood Capital Group later purchased at 40% equity share in a portfolio of construction loans and real estate owned assets formerly held by the bank. The FDIC held the remaining 60% equity share of the $4.5 billion portfolio.

In 2010, Corus Bankshares filed for Chapter 11 bankruptcy protection as it faced a possible dissolution.
