= Walter Energy =

U.S. coal producer

Walter Energy, Inc.
- Type: Public
- Traded as: OTC Pink: WLTGQ
- Industry: Coal Mining; Energy
- Founded: Tampa, Florida in 1946
- Headquarters: Galleria Tower; Birmingham, Alabama, United States
- Key people: Walt Scheller, Chief Executive Officer
- Products: Coal; Coke (fuel); Natural Gas; Anthracite
- Revenue: ▲$2.7 billion USD (2011)
- Number of employees: 4,400 (2011, including contractors)
- Website: www.walterenergy.com

Walter Energy, Inc. was a publicly traded "pure play" metallurgical coal producer for the global steel industry. The company also produced natural gas, steam coal and industrial coal, anthracite, metallurgical coke, and coal bed methane gas. Corporate and U.S. headquarters were located in Birmingham, Alabama, and its Canadian & UK headquarters in Vancouver, British Columbia. Walter Energy filed for bankruptcy in 2015 and its assets were purchased by Warrior Met Coal.

== Divisions ==
=== U.S. ===
The company's U.S. underground mines produced high-quality coal from Alabama's Blue Creek seam. Jim Walter Resources, the Company's U.S. underground coal mining unit, has grown from a small producer of less than 1 million tons of coal per year, produced solely for use in its sister company's coke ovens, into one of the 25 largest metallurgical coal producers in the United States, with 2010 metallurgical coal sales of approximately 6.0 million metric tons and plans to expand sales to 8.5 million metric tons of metallurgical coal by 2013. Its metallurgical coal mines, No. 4 and No. 7, are two of the deepest vertical shaft coal mines in North America at nearly 2,000 feet deep. The mines also produce a significant quantity of coal bed methane gas. Jim Walter Resources also operates the North River steam coal mine.

The U.S. Division operates the Maple Coal and Gauley Eagle mines in West Virginia, and mines in South Wales in Britain. These mines were formerly owned by Western Coal Corp.

Walter Minerals, an Alabama-based surface coal producer with a capacity of nearly 1.5 million tons, which produces coal for the Alabama steam and industrial coal markets, also is included in the Company's U.S. operations.

Walter Coke, the company's fuel coke producer, manufactures coke for use in blast furnaces and foundries. The Birmingham, Alabama company was formerly known as Sloss Industries.

=== Canada and U.K. ===
Walter Energy's Canadian and European operations consist of three mines in British Columbia, Canada and a project in Wales at Aberpergwm, UK.

== History ==
The company was formerly known as Walter Industries, Inc. and changed its name to Walter Energy in April 2009. The predecessor company was founded by Tampa entrepreneur the late James W. Walter Sr. in 1946 as a builder of affordable, stick-built homes across the southeast. It spun off Mueller Water Products in 2006, closed Jim Walter Homes in 2009, also spinning off Walter Investment Management Corporation in 2009.

=== 2001 mine disaster ===
At approximately 5:15 p.m. on September 23, 2001, at the Jim Walter Resources No. 5 coal mine in Brookwood, 40 miles southwest of Birmingham, a cave-in caused a release of methane gas that sparked two major explosions, killing thirteen miners.
