= Bobby Lowder =

American businessman

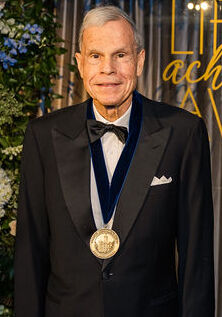
- Lowder in 2023
- Born: Robert E. Lowder; 1944 (age 81–82); Montgomery, Alabama, U.S.
- Education: Auburn University (BS)
- Title: Founder and CEO of Colonial Bank

Robert E. Lowder (born ca. 1944 in Alabama) is a former American banking executive, and founder and former longtime CEO of the failed Colonial Bank and Colonial BancGroup, Colonial Bank's former parent company. He also served as a trustee at his alma mater Auburn University from 1983 to 2012.

== Education ==
Lowder is an Auburn University alumnus, graduating with a B.S. in Business Administration in 1964. While at Auburn he was a member of the Army ROTC and the Sigma Nu fraternity.

== Banking career ==
Lowder was Chairman of the Board and CEO of Colonial BancGroup, positions he held for 25 years. In 2006, his total compensation was $2.77 million and his five-year compensation total was $11.23 million, making him one of the 50 most highly compensated banking executives in the United States at that time. He retired from Colonial Bank on May 28, 2009, but remained on the Board of Trustees at Auburn University.

Colonial BancGroup was reported to be under Federal investigation for possible criminal activities of its financial dealings in its mortgage subsidiary in August, 2009, and on August 14, 2009, Colonial Bank was shut down by banking regulators, with its deposits and branches purchased by BB&T.

== Auburn University Board of Trustees ==
Lowder began serving on the Auburn University Board of Trustees in 1983. In 2001, the Board of Trustees at Auburn summarily dismissed President William Muse, inspiring anger and votes of no confidence in Board members. The widespread belief on campus was that Lowder exerted tight private control over the Board, and thus over the ostensibly public university, using his clout to place some of his close friends in positions of power.

Lowder has long been regarded as one of the nation's most powerful college boosters and power-behind-the-scenes trustees at Auburn. In 2003, when then-University President William F. Walker and athletic director David Housel secretly spoke with University of Louisville football coach Bobby Petrino about taking over Auburn University football coach Tommy Tuberville's job, it was Lowder's private jet which they flew to Louisville.

In the Spring of 2011, Alabama Governor Robert J. Bentley was the decisive vote on the five member nominating committee, which chose to re-appoint Lowder for another twelve-year term on the Board. Some claims suggest the Governor voted in favor of Lowder due to his wife's donation of $25,000 to the Bentley campaign on September 21, 2010. Following this vote, a former alumni association president, Andy Hornsby, filed a civil lawsuit in Lee County Circuit Court, claiming that the appointment violated the state's Open Meetings Act. Just a few days later, on May 16, 2011, Lowder contacted the Governor's Office asking his name be withdrawn from consideration for reappointment.

Lowder's tenure on the Auburn University Board of Trustees ended on April 10, 2012, when the Alabama state senate voted to replace five of the fourteen members. Lowder's successor on the board, M. Clark Sahlie, was elected to a seven-year term.
