= Texas ratio =

The Texas ratio is a metric used to assess the extent of a bank's credit problems.

Developed by Gerard Cassidy and others at RBC Capital Markets, it is calculated by dividing the value of the lender's non-performing assets (NPL + Real Estate Owned) by the sum of its tangible common equity capital and loan loss reserves.

While analyzing Texas banks during the early 1980s recession, Cassidy observed that banks typically failed when this ratio reached 1:1, or 100%. He later identified a similar pattern among New England banks during the early 1990s recession.
