= Merle Hay Mall =

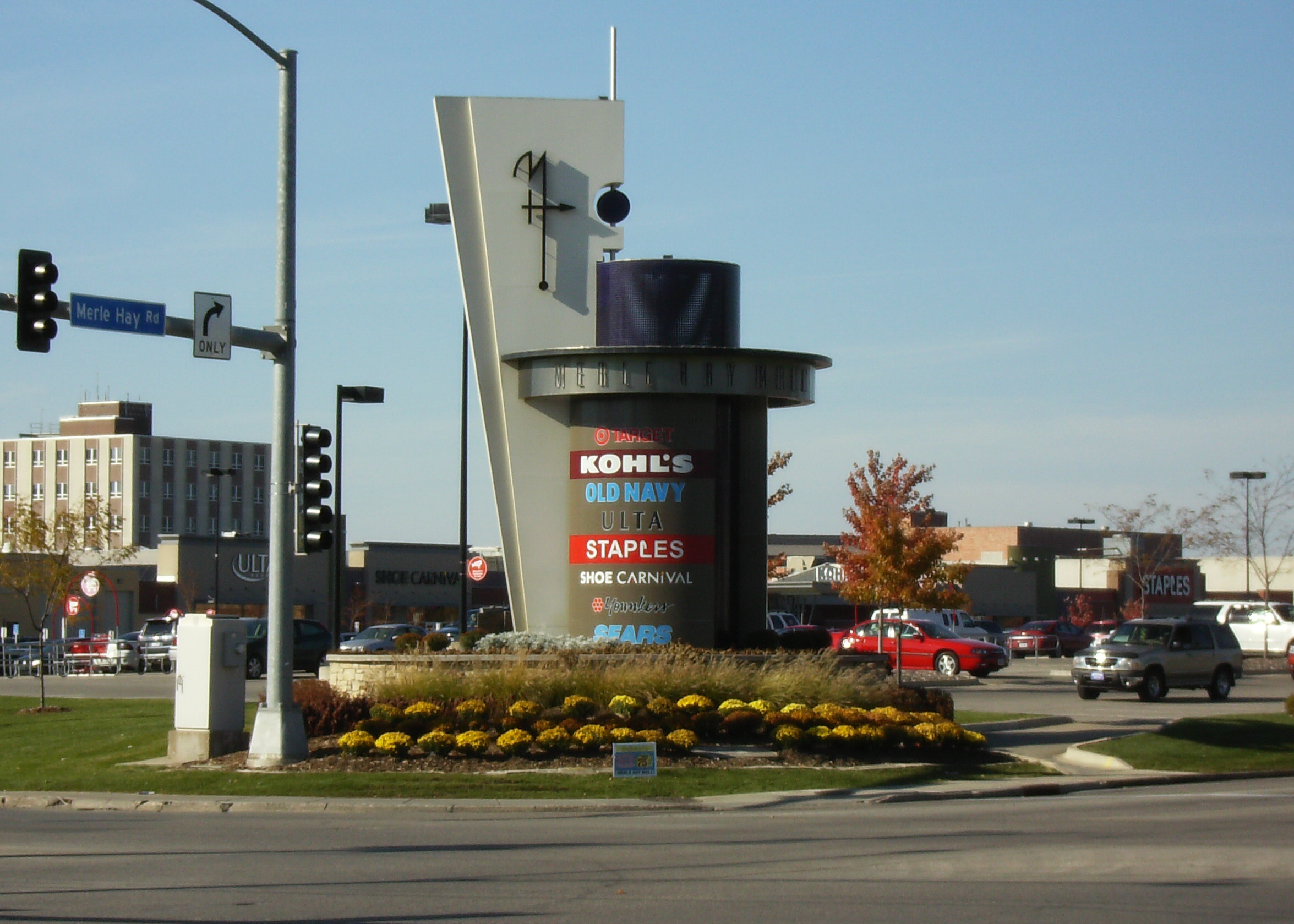
- Sign of the mall outside
- Location: Des Moines and Urbandale, Iowa, United States
- Coordinates: 41.631667°N 93.700556°W
- Opened: August 17, 1959
- Developer: Joseph Abbell & Bernard Greenbaum
- Manager: Merle Hay Mall Limited Partnership/ Urban Retail Properties (leasing)
- Owner: Merle Hay Mall Limited Partnership
- Num. of stores: 87 (as of August 2015)
- Num. of anchor tenants: 5 (4 open, 1 coming soon)
- Floor area: 1,060,000 square feet (98,000 m^{2})
- Floors: 1 (2 in center court area and former Younkers)
- Parking: 6,000 spaces
- Public transit: DART
- Website: merlehaymall.com

Merle Hay Mall is an enclosed super-regional shopping mall in Des Moines, Iowa, in the United States. Opened in 1959, it is the second oldest regional shopping center in Iowa, and was the largest mall in Iowa in terms of gross leasable area before the 2004 opening of Jordan Creek Town Center in neighboring West Des Moines. It was also the site of the deadliest fire in Des Moines' history, which killed eleven people in 1978.

The mall's anchor stores are Target, Kohl’s, Dinks Pickleball, and Ross Dress for Less. There is one anchor store that was once Younkers - which is set for remodeling as an ice arena. The mall used to have a Sears which was demolished in 2021. Applebee's, IHOP, and Starbucks operate on the out parcels of the mall. Other prominent stores in the mall include Old Navy. Most of the mall is in the northwest part of Des Moines, but the wing that contains the former Younkers, Dinks Pickleball and the food court is inside the city limits of neighboring Urbandale.

Merle Hay Mall is independently owned by the Merle Hay Mall Limited Partnership, and the family of one of its original developers continues to manage the mall. A Chicago-based company, Urban Retail Properties, handles the mall's leasing duties.

== History ==
The site of Merle Hay Mall was originally home to St. Gabriel's Monastery from 1921 until its demolition in 1958. In 1956, the Passionist monks who resided there sold the monastery site to Chicago-based developers Joseph Abbell and Bernard Greenbaum. Abbell, in a 1994 interview, stated that the developers chose Des Moines for their mall because of the city's "reputation as a model urban area in middle America." The mall was known as Northland Shopping Center early in its planning stages until Younkers executives suggested that it be named for Merle Hay, the first Iowan killed in World War I and namesake of the road in front of the mall, instead. Merle Hay Plaza was originally planned as a strip mall before it was redesigned as an open-air plaza with two department stores and four buildings around a common area shortly before construction began in early 1958.

Merle Hay Plaza opened on August 17, 1959. It had 31 stores at the time of its opening, including its first anchor (Younkers), as well as a bowling alley that is still in operation today. A second anchor store opened later in 1959, as Sears moved from downtown Des Moines to Merle Hay Plaza. Other early tenants included a Safeway supermarket (whose space later became part of Sears), Kresge, Bishop's Buffet (which closed in 1995), and Walgreens (which was replaced by an Old Navy in 1999). A movie theater and six-story office building were added in 1965.

=== Enclosure ===
Merle Hay Plaza was enclosed in 1972 and became Merle Hay Mall. Two years later, as Valley West Mall and Southridge Mall were under construction, Merle Hay Mall completed a major westward expansion that doubled the size of the mall. Two additional anchors, Montgomery Ward (which also moved from downtown) and Younkers Store for Homes, were added to the mall as part of that expansion. By 2000, Merle Hay Mall attracted an average of 35,000 shoppers per day.

In a 1994 interview with The Des Moines Register, Iowa State University economist Kenneth Stone stated that Merle Hay Mall successfully adapted to the changing lifestyles of the 1960s and 1970s by offering longer shopping hours during a time when downtown Des Moines merchants began restricting their hours. Author and Des Moines native Bill Bryson commented on how Merle Hay Mall's opening changed Des Moines in his 2006 memoir The Life and Times of the Thunderbolt Kid: "My father never shopped anywhere else after that. Neither did most people. By the early 1960s, people exchanged boasts about how long it had been since they had been downtown. They had found a new kind of happiness at the malls." In 1989's The Lost Continent, Bryson wrote that "Jack Kerouac, of all people, thought that Iowa women were the prettiest in the country, but I don't think he ever went to Merle Hay Mall on a Saturday" when he commented on the obesity of Iowa women.

=== Younkers fire ===
The original Younkers store at Merle Hay Mall was destroyed by a fire that broke out on the morning of November 5, 1978. The fire caused an estimated $20 million in damage, and killed eleven store employees. The store was closed for nearly a year in order to rebuild.

In early 1979, Des Moines fire officials announced that a hydrogen buildup caused by alkaline water leaking from the store's heating and cooling system caused the fire. Court documents filed by prosecuting attorneys in 1981 stated that an electrical malfunction caused wires that were covered in polyvinyl chloride to overheat, giving off hydrochloric acid. Lawyers representing Younkers and the families of the eleven victims sued more than 20 companies that manufactured or were associated with polyvinyl chloride, including Monsanto Company and Underwriters Laboratories. Most of those lawsuits were settled out of court in 1984, while the last suit against B.F. Goodrich was dismissed by a Polk County district judge in April 1986.

=== Anchor changes ===
Merle Hay Mall lost its first anchor in 1991 when the Younkers Store for Homes closed after Younkers decided to stop selling furniture and appliances in order to focus on its more profitable fashion business. Kohl's replaced it in 1993.

In 1998, during the chain's first round of Chapter 11 bankruptcy, Montgomery Ward faced eviction from the mall after an analysis by Kenneth Stone showed that Ward was operating a discount store instead of the "first class, full line department store" that its lease required. Montgomery Ward responded by closing in early 1999, and Famous-Barr opened a new store in that space in August 2000, while the rest of the mall underwent a $20 million renovation that year. Younkers moved into the former Famous-Barr space on July 18, 2004, one month after Famous-Barr left the Des Moines market, and the old Younkers was demolished shortly afterwards to make room for a new Target store that opened July 19, 2005. Target's opening ended a period of declining sales at the mall, as sales had decreased by 8 to 10 percent during the first year that Jordan Creek Town Center was open.

=== Present-day redevelopment ===
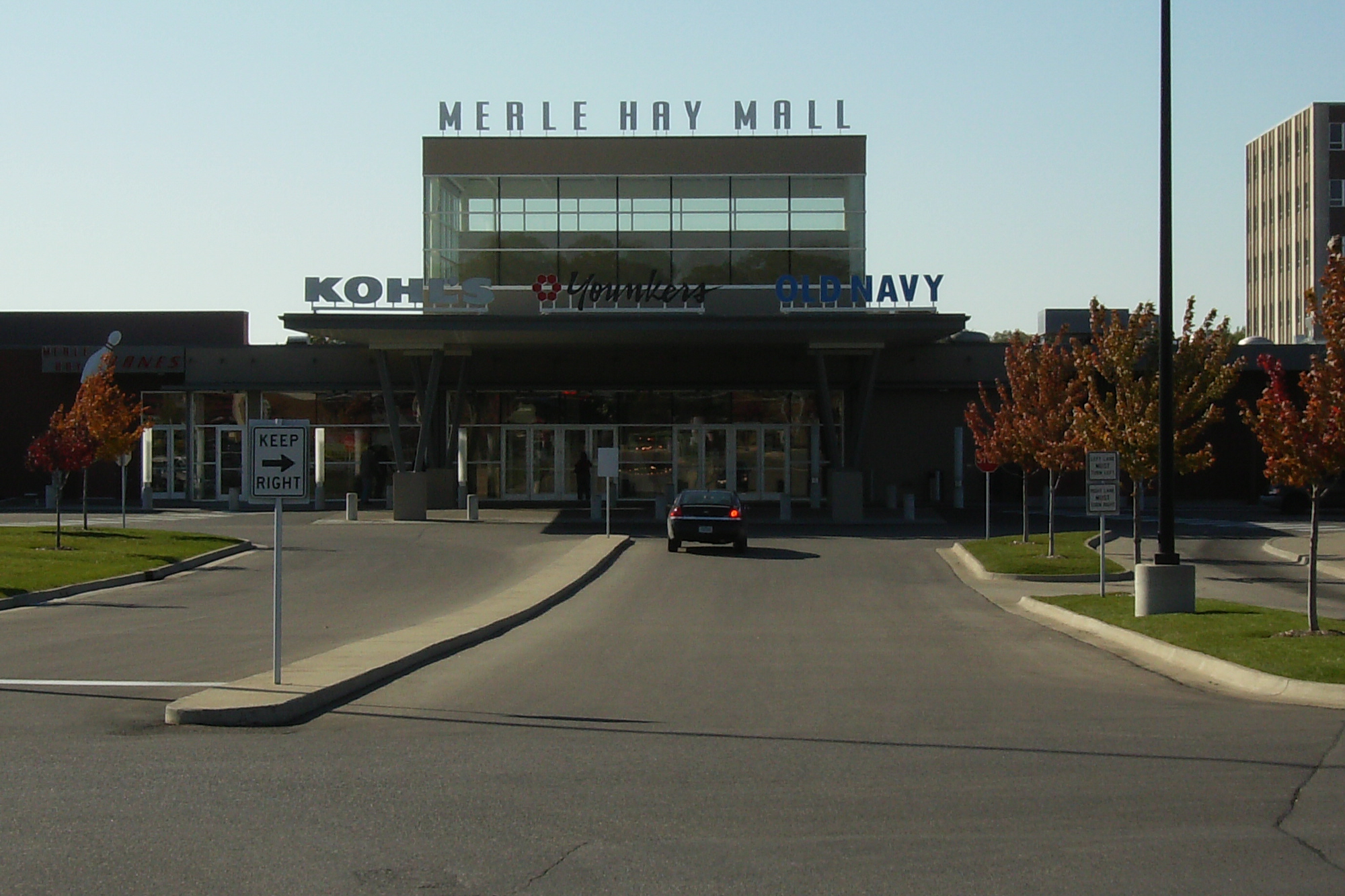
Merle Hay Mall's new main entrance, 2009

The mall is anchored by Kohl's (73,799 sq ft), Target (126,483 sq ft), Dinks Pickleball (165,000 sq ft), which was last occupied by Kohl’s which relocated. The mall has one vacant anchor space under development to become a hockey facility which was formerly occupied by Younkers (165,000 sq ft) The mall has over 60 inline tenants including a food court along with a vacant portion of the building which had been a single-screen movie theater with the largest movie screen in Des Moines. During the Christmas holiday season there are several businesses which occupy space in the mall temporarily too. It is managed by Abbell Credit Corporation, the same company that has held a majority ownership interest in the mall since 1959. It has undergone several renovations over time to remain a viable shopping center. According to Elizabeth Holland, the CEO of Abbell Credit Corporation, the Des Moines area is large enough to support only two shopping malls, and the goal of the Merle Hay Mall redevelopment is to make it "become one of the two surviving shopping malls."

On March 10, 2008, the Des Moines City Council agreed to rezone the area around Merle Hay Mall into a tax increment financing district in order to help the mall's owners pay for future renovations. The move came as the mall's assessed property value had declined by over $13 million since 2005. Merle Hay Mall's owners constructed a new main entrance to the mall and relocated some retailers to other areas of the mall in order to create space for new "junior" anchor stores with exterior entrances. The spaces occupied by the former Sam Goody Superstore (replaced by Staples), the former Waldenbooks and GameStop (which is now next to the former Helzberg Diamonds) were renovated to include Staples. Old Navy moved to the west into a space across from their former location which made way for Shoe Carnival and Ulta to occupy Old Navy's space. As a result of the redevelopment, Old Navy has relocated to a smaller space within the mall. In 2013, Dunham's Sports moved out of the mall, with MC Sports replacing it. However, in 2017, MC Sports filed for bankruptcy and moved out shortly after. It has since been replaced with a bouncy-house arena. The upper level became a Flix Brewhouse movie theater in mid-2014. Flix has proven to be an exceptionally popular destination not just in the mall, but in all of greater Des Moines. In 2015, Deb closed. Staples announced in late-2016 that it would be closing their store in Merle Hay Mall with the actual last day of business occurring on February 4, 2017. In October 2017, the Staples location became Ross Dress for Less. On April 18, 2018 it was announced that Younkers would be closing, as the parent, Bon-Ton Stores, was going out of business. The store closed on August 29, 2018. On July 13, 2018 Sears announced they will also be closing at Merle Hay Mall. The nearly 60 year-old anchor was one of the original stores but ended business at the mall in October 2018 which left Kohl's and Target as the only anchors. In December 2019, GameDay arcade and restaurant opened in the mall. It is accessible from both outside and inside the mall.

2020 brought challenges for retailers in the mall due, in part, to the response to the COVID-19 pandemic which resulted in many retailers being closed for a prolonged period of time. By August, some prominent retailers, Helzberg Diamonds, Victoria's Secret and Justice among them; closed their locations in the mall. In October 2020, it was announced that the vacant Sears building would be demolished to facilitate future development. Kohl’s would relocate their department store to the old Sears plot. In November 2020, the Des Moines Buccaneers hockey team announced they would build a new sports facility in the old Younkers and adjacent areas. The new project will see a 3,500-capacity arena for the Bucs, three additional sheets of ice for tournaments and community use, and a 150-room hotel, to be completed ahead of the 2022-23 hockey season.

In November, 2023, Dinks Pickleball opened in the former Kohl’s building utilizing the entire anchor store space as a 13 court, indoor permanent pickleball facility.

In 2025, Merle Hay Mall announced that the new hockey sports facility would be operated by the mall entirely. The Des Moines Buccaneers exited their partnership with the Merle Hay Mall with the intention that Merle Hay Mall would be the sole operator of the hockey sports facility. Despite this, the Merle Hay Mall is still committed to building a hockey sports facility in the former Younkers building. Plans are still moving ahead to redevelop the building with Des Moines City Council approving the development. It was also added that the arena could also host soccer games, concerts, and other events. The plan for the site also includes construction of a 50,000-square-foot volleyball facility and potentially a hotel. Perkins & Will Architects was brought on board to come up with the architectural drawings for the new facility. Construction on the new hockey sports facility is set to begin in 2026 with the facility expected to be completed in fall 2027.
