= Von Maur =

American department store chain

Von Maur, Inc.

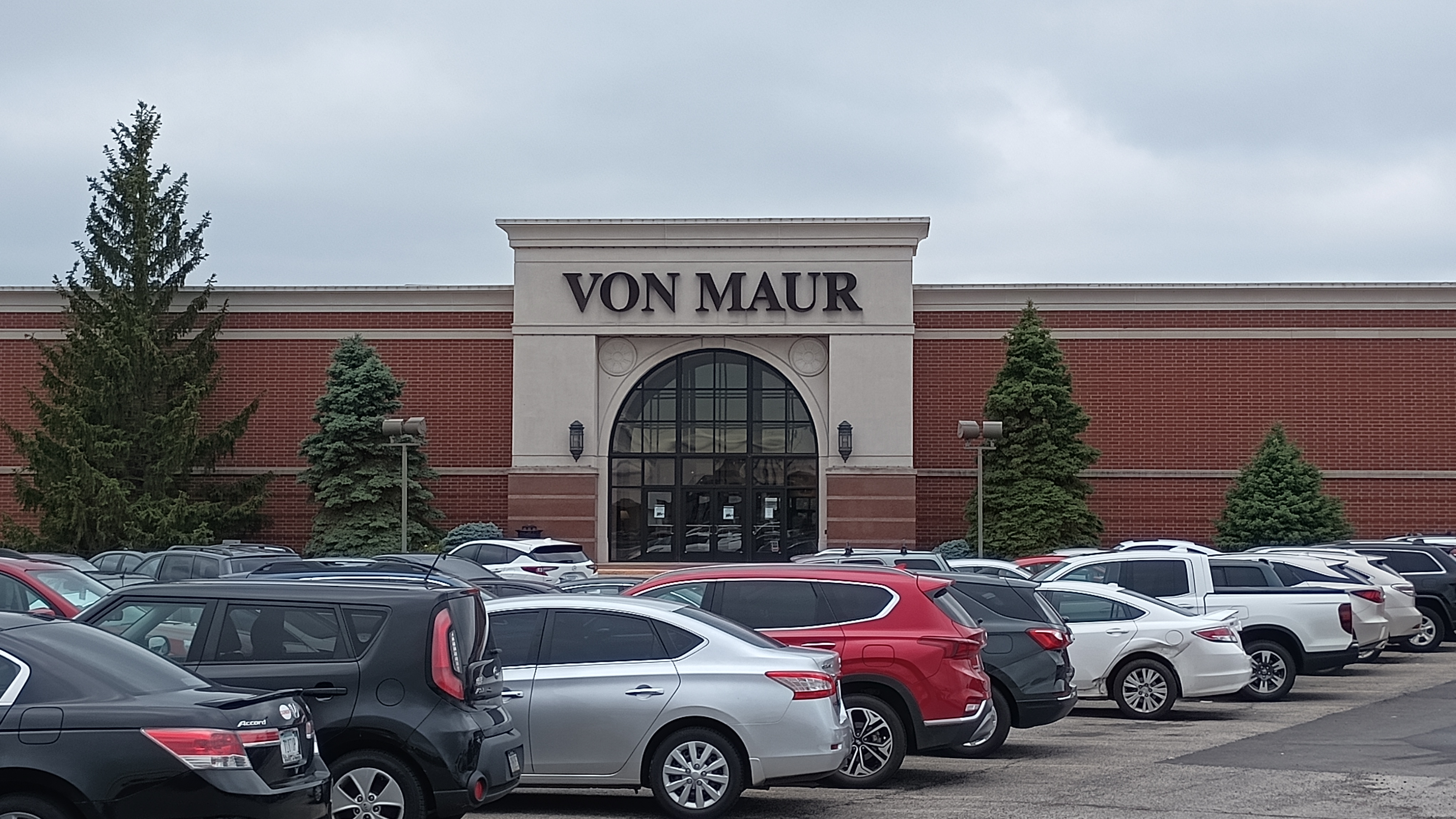
- Exterior of the Von Maur store at Castleton Square in Indianapolis (2023)
- Formerly: J.H.C. Petersen's Sons' (1872–1926); Boston Store (1887–1895); Harned & Von Maur (1895–1928); Petersen Harned Von Maur (1928–1989)
- Type: Private
- Industry: Retail
- Genre: Department stores
- Founded: 1872; 154 years ago
- Headquarters: Davenport, Iowa, United States
- Number of locations: 38 (2024)
- Key people: Charles R. von Maur (co-chairman); Richard B. von Maur (co-chairman); James D. von Maur (president and CEO)
- Products: Clothing; footwear; jewelry; handbags; beauty products
- Revenue: US$1 billion (2019)
- Owner: Von Maur family
- Number of employees: 5,000 (2020)
- Subsidiaries: Dry Goods USA
- Website: vonmaur.com

Von Maur, Inc. (Note: /vɒn ˈmɑːr/ von MAR) is an American department store chain based in Davenport, Iowa. Founded in 1872, the chain operates 38 locations across the United States, primarily in the Midwest.

== History ==
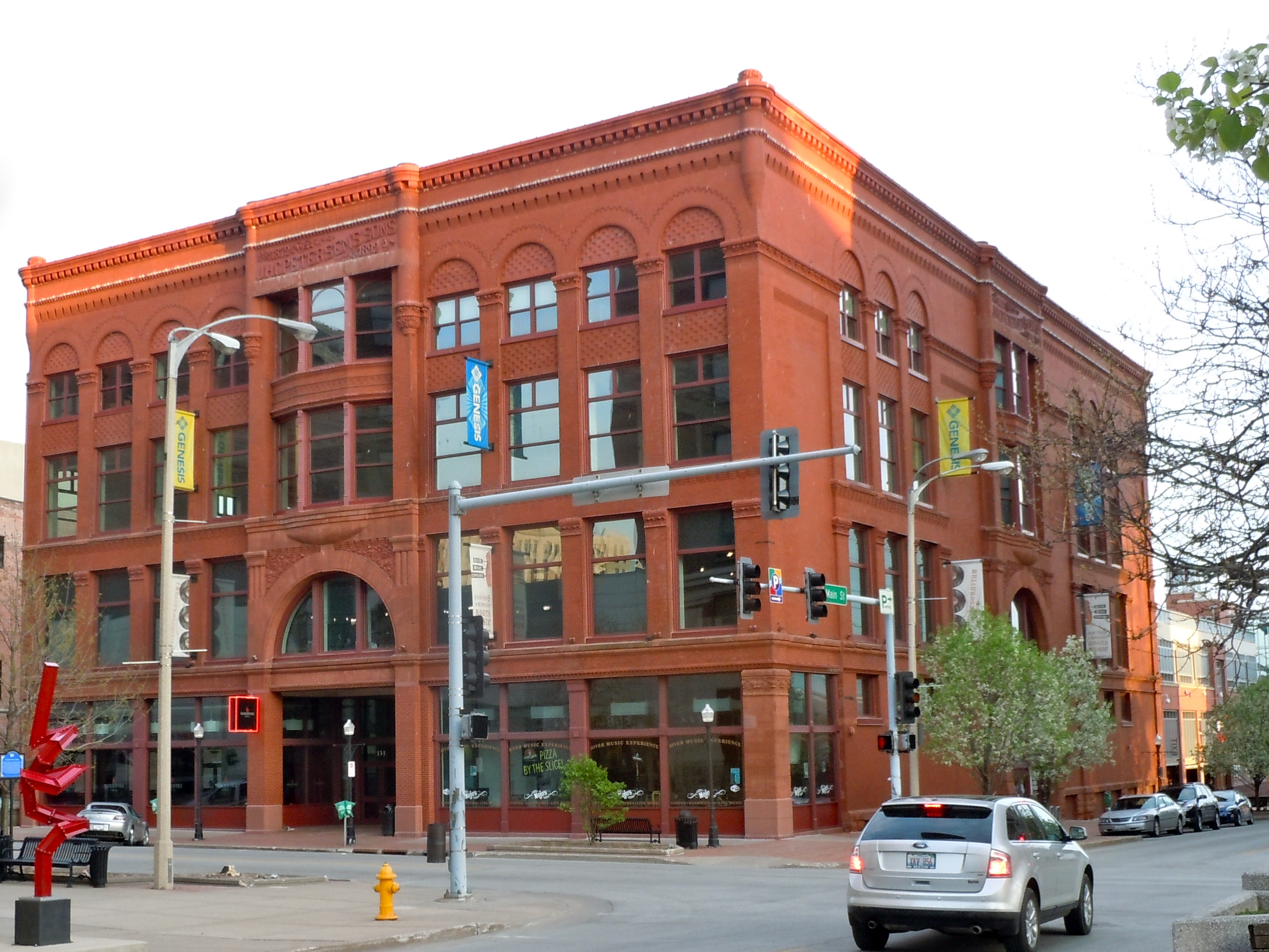
The J.H.C. Petersen's Sons' Store in Davenport, Iowa

=== Beginnings ===
In 1872, German immigrant J. H. C. Petersen and his three sons opened a store in a 20-by-50-foot (6 by 15 m) storefront in downtown Davenport, Iowa. The store eventually expanded and moved into their flagship store, the Redstone Building at 2nd and Main Streets in Davenport. In 1916, J.H.C. Petersen's son, William D. Petersen, sold the family store to a partnership of R.H. Harned, C.J. von Maur, and Cable von Maur.

C.J. von Maur, who came from Austria, established the Boston Store (later renamed Harned & Von Maur) in downtown Davenport in 1887. Despite the common ownership, Petersen's and Harned & Von Maur continued to operate as separate stores for twelve years, even after C.J. von Maur died in 1926. On May 7, 1928, Harned & Von Maur merged with the Petersen's store in what is now known as the Redstone Building. The store was renamed Petersen Harned Von Maur, which was often shortened to "Petersen's". The von Maur family assumed complete ownership of the store after R.H. Harned died in 1937.

=== 1970s–1980s ===
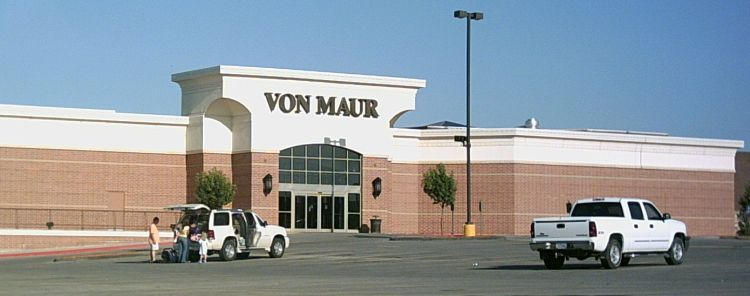
Exterior of a now closed Von Maur at Valley West Mall in West Des Moines, Iowa

In the company's centennial year of 1972, Petersen Harned Von Maur opened its first branch store at Duck Creek Plaza in Bettendorf, Iowa. Another branch store opened at SouthPark Mall in Moline, Illinois, in 1974. In 1976, Petersen's opened its first store outside the Quad Cities area at Valley West Mall in West Des Moines, Iowa. The company continued to open new stores in shopping malls throughout Iowa and Illinois during the late 1970s and 1980s; along the way it acquired two former Killian's department stores in Cedar Rapids and Iowa City, Iowa, in 1981. As the company shifted its focus to malls, the Petersen Harned Von Maur flagship store in downtown Davenport closed in 1986. The Redstone Building is now home to the River Music Experience.

Petersen Harned Von Maur shortened its name to Von Maur in 1989 to reflect the von Maur family's management of the company. One year later, it moved its corporate headquarters and executive offices from the Redstone Building to a 200,000-square-foot (19,000 m^{2}) building on Brady Street (near the interchange with Interstate 80) in Davenport. The company distributes all of its merchandise from this building using its own fleet of semi-trucks. It also has its own credit union and credit department as well as a print shop.

In 1989, Von Maur purchased stores vacated by Carson Pirie Scott at Hickory Point Mall in Forsyth and College Hills Mall in Normal.

=== 1990s–2000s ===
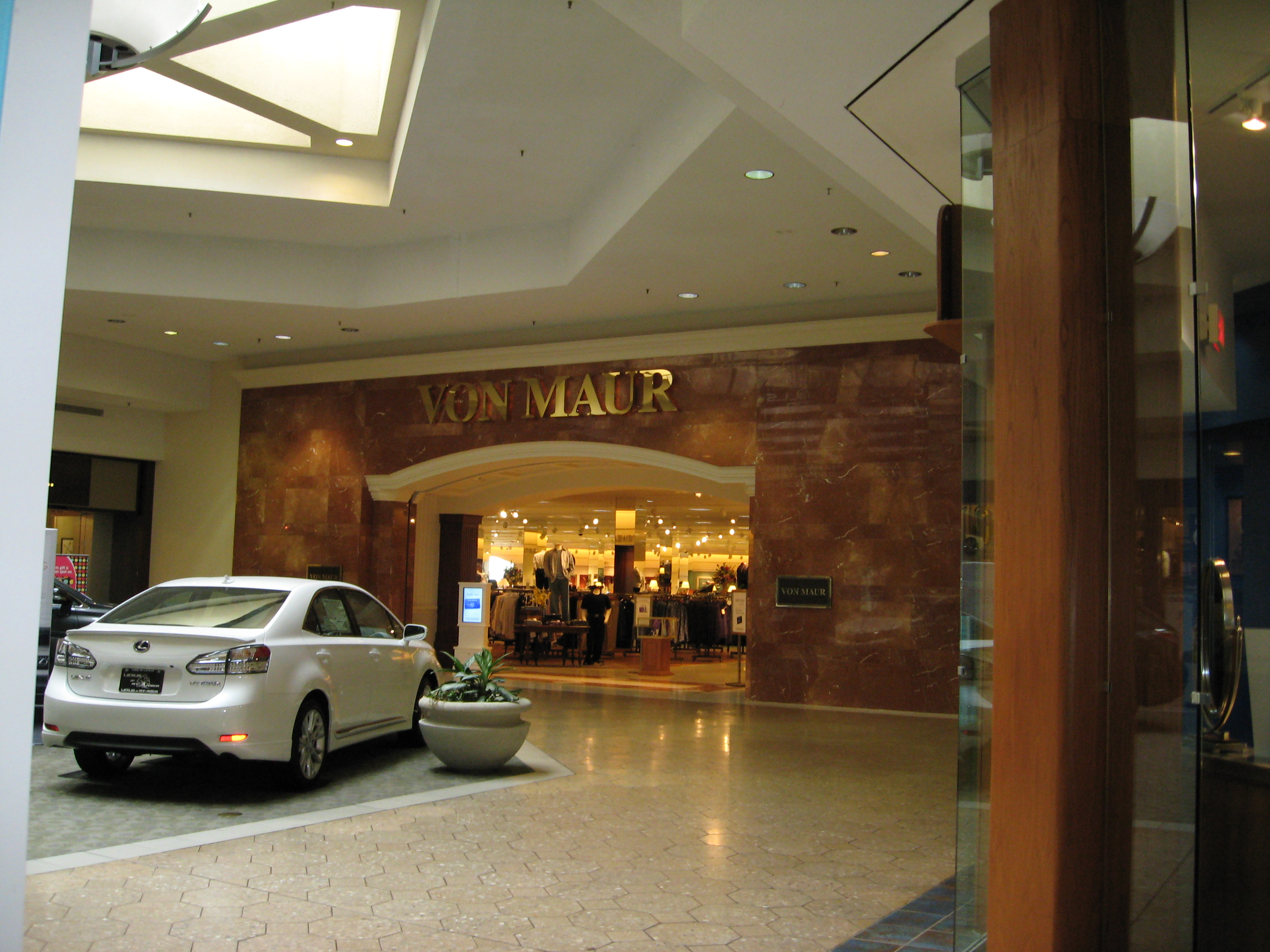
Von Maur entrance, Briarwood Mall, Ann Arbor, Michigan

Von Maur successfully entered the Chicago market in 1994 with a 207,000-square-foot (19,200 m^{2}) flagship store at Yorktown Center in Lombard, Illinois, taking over space there formerly occupied by Wieboldt's. Von Maur currently has seven stores in Illinois, more than any other state. From there, the company expanded its geographic reach into Indiana, Kansas, Kentucky, Minnesota, and Nebraska during the late 1990s and early 2000s while closing stores in Bettendorf, Iowa, and Muscatine, Iowa, during this period. In 2004 Von Maur expanded into Michigan by taking over two mall locations of the defunct Jacobson's chain (The Briarwood Mall in Ann Arbor, Michigan, and Laurel Park Place in Livonia, Michigan). In late 2005 it opened a store at Polaris Fashion Place in Columbus, Ohio, the 23rd store in the chain. On January 31, 2007, Von Maur closed its store at Westdale Mall in Cedar Rapids, Iowa, which brought the store count down to 22.

On December 5, 2007, the Von Maur location in Westroads Mall in Omaha, Nebraska, was the site of a mass shooting when a 19-year-old man entered the store with an assault rifle, killing 8 and injuring six more before killing himself.

On Saturday, September 13, 2008, Von Maur opened its 23rd store, a 140,000 sq ft (13,000 m^{2}) store in Phase II of The Greene, a project of Steiner Associates in Dayton, Ohio.

The 24th store at the Corbin Park Lifestyle Center in Overland Park, Kansas, had its soft opening on Monday, November 3, 2008, and the grand opening on Saturday, November 8, 2008.

=== 2010s–present ===
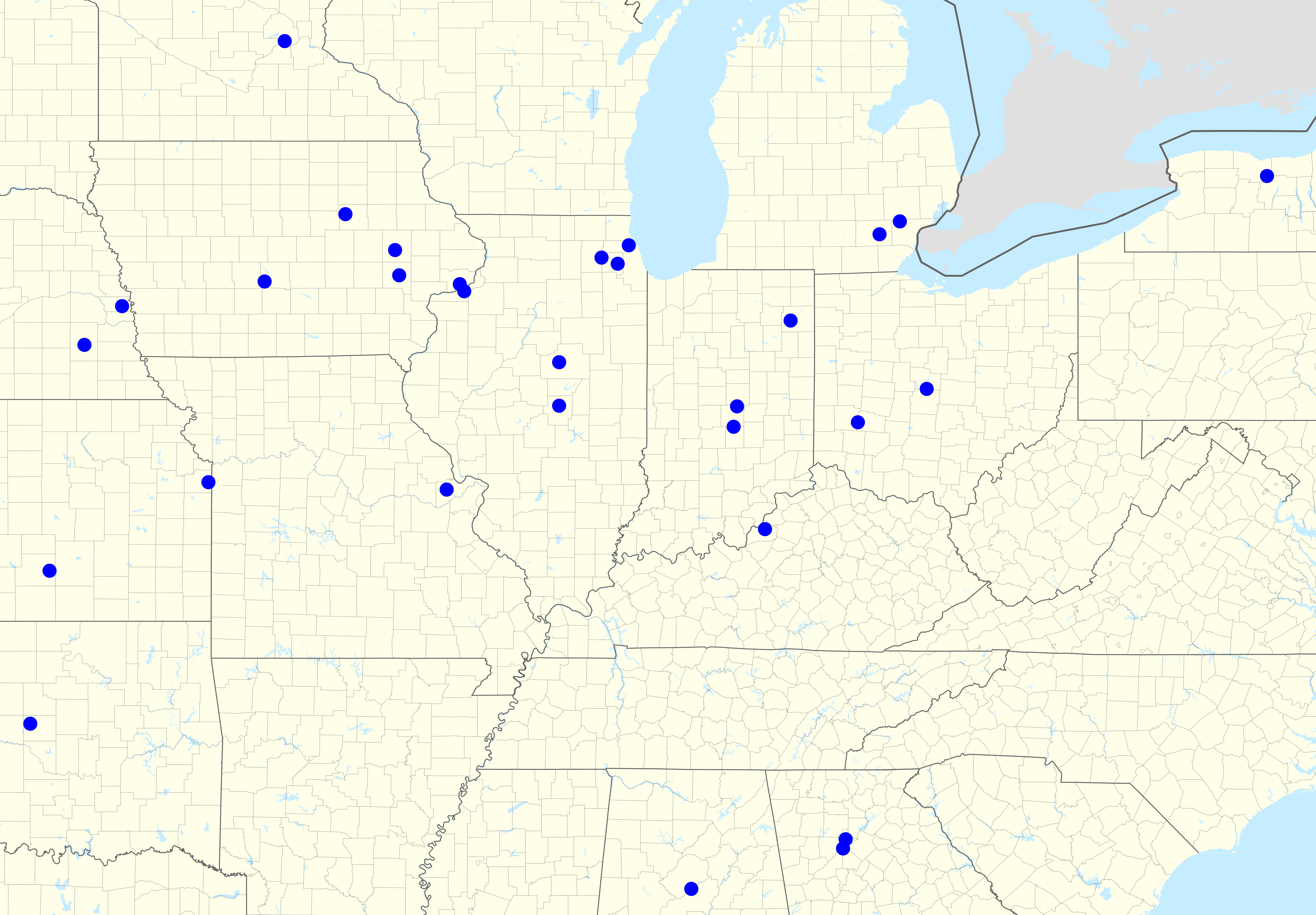
Map of Von Maur locations as of 2015

Today, the privately held company remains under the leadership of the Von Maur family, including co-chairmen Charles R. von Maur and Richard B. von Maur, as well as president James D. von Maur. Von Maur offers free gift wrapping year-round as well as free shipping year-round. Von Maur caters to the typical middle-class consumer. In the past five years, the chain has expanded out of its Midwestern home territory to open stores in Georgia, Alabama, New York, and Oklahoma.

September 18, 2010 marked Von Maur's entrance into the St. Louis, Missouri market as the anchor of The Meadows shopping center in Lake St. Louis.

On November 11, 2010, Von Maur announced the chain would open its first store in the Southeast in the Atlanta suburb of Alpharetta. The regional flagship store would convert a former location previously occupied by Lord & Taylor, then Belk, at the North Point Mall into a much larger anchor. The store opened in early November 2011.

In March 2011, it was reported Von Maur would enter the Wisconsin market with a store in the Milwaukee area at a new lifestyle shopping center in Brookfield named The Corners. The proposed store was to have been combined with a three-story parking structure and had been predicted to open in the fall of 2014, but numerous project delays occurred. Von Maur's 32nd location, it opened on April 8, 2017.

In September 2011, Von Maur announced that it would open a store in Coralville, Iowa, at Iowa River Landing, replacing the chain's Iowa City store, previously located at Sycamore Mall.

In November 2011, it was announced that Von Maur would enter New York State with its first store at Eastview Mall, outside Rochester, replacing a Bon-Ton store. Von Maur's first northeast location opened on October 26, 2013.

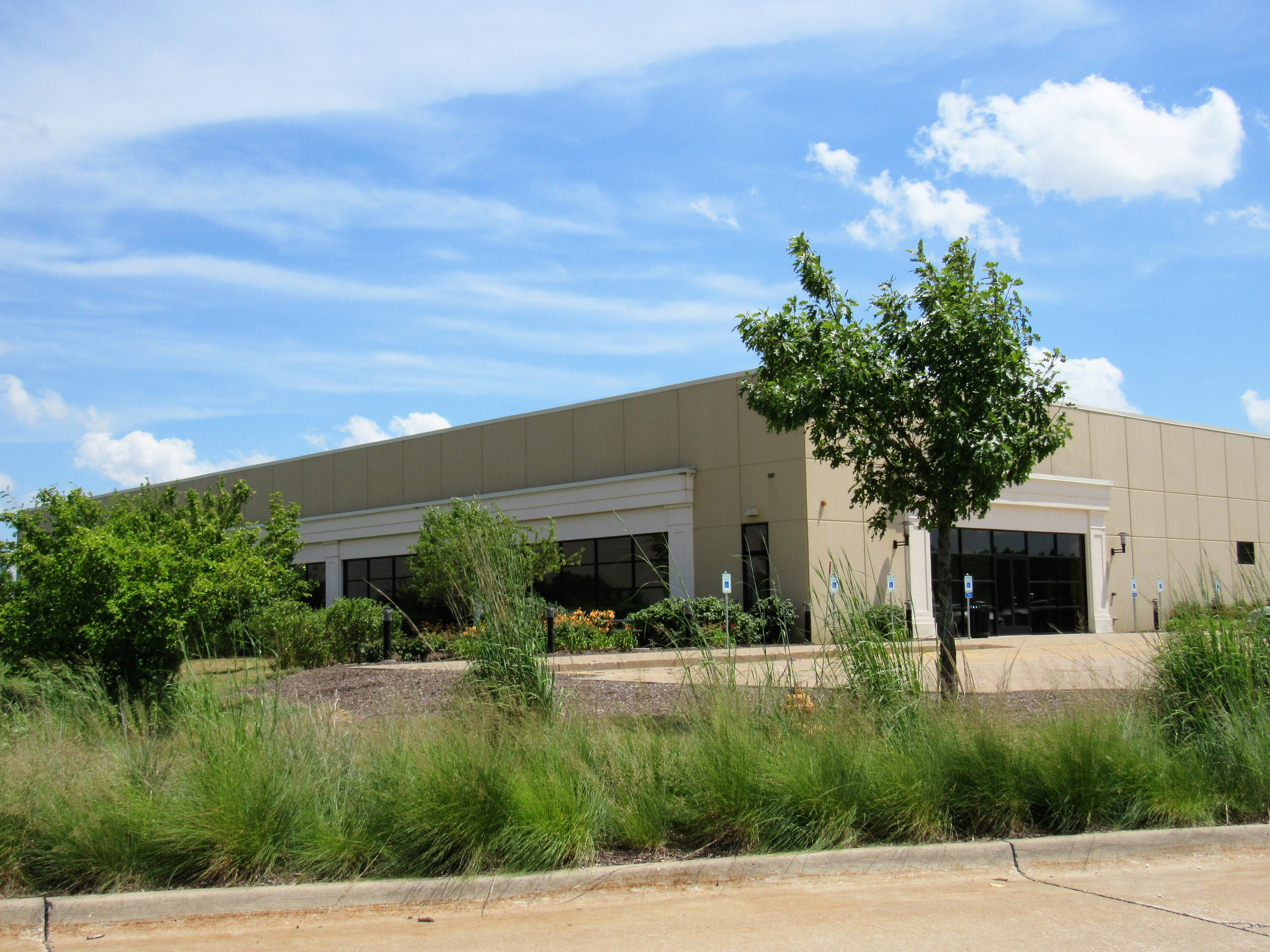
Von Maur E-Commerce Fulfillment Center in Davenport

Von Maur announced in early January 2012 they would be opening their second Atlanta area store at the soon-to-be shuttered Bloomingdale's location at Perimeter Mall in north suburban Dunwoody, while the company's president said that he would like to have four or five stores in the market during this time. The three-story, 240,000-square-foot (22,000 m^{2}) store opened on November 10, 2012.

On November 2, 2013, the chain opened its first store in Alabama, at the Riverchase Galleria in the Birmingham suburb of Hoover. The store is located in the space first occupied by Macy's, then Proffitt's, and later Belk.

On February 27, 2013, it was announced that Von Maur would be opening a new location in Oklahoma City as the fourth anchor store at Quail Springs Mall, replacing Sears. The 155,000-square-foot (14,400 m^{2}) facility opened on October 18, 2014 and marked the 30th location for Von Maur.

In September 2016, Von Maur would open their third Georgia store in a former Nordstrom location at the Mall of Georgia in Buford, Georgia.

In March 2016, the company announced that it would open a second store in the Minneapolis-St. Paul area. The two-story, 140,000-square foot store at Rosedale Center opened on October 13, 2018, joining the existing store at Eden Prairie Center.

In February 2017, It was announced that the longstanding Sears store at Woodland Mall in the Grand Rapids suburb of Kentwood, Michigan, would close and reopen as Von Maur in 2019, along with other additions to the mall.

In February 2018, the company announced it would open a store at the Jordan Creek Town Center in West Des Moines, Iowa. That store opened in 2022 and replaced the Valley West location.

In August 2022, the company announced it would open a store at South Hills Village in suburban Pittsburgh, its first store in the state of Pennsylvania.

On December 16, 2025, the company announced it would open a store at Freehold Raceway Mall in Freehold, New Jersey in the former Nordstrom spot in fall 2027, its first location in that state.

== Dry Goods USA ==
Dry Goods USA is a subsidiary of Von Maur. The company started as Von Maur Dry Goods in 1872 with a 20x50 rented storefront in Downtown Davenport. William D. Petersen would sell his Davenport store called J.H.C Petersen's Sons to the Von Maur family. They rebranded as Petersen Harned Von Maur in 1928 after combining Petersen's and Harned & Von Maur, with Dry Goods USA serving as a subsidiary. In 1989, they rebranded once more to simply Von Maur, with Dry Goods USA still a subsidiary. As of 2024, Dry Goods USA has 82 locations in 22 states, with an 83rd location expected to open in Delaware, their 23rd state.

== Bibliography ==
- FundingUniverse.com. "Von Maur Inc. Company History".
