= Valley West Mall =

Shopping in West Des Moines, Iowa

- Sign entrance to Valley West Mall, 2006
- Location: West Des Moines, Iowa, United States
- Coordinates: 41.5975706°N 93.7497039°W
- Opened: August 4, 1975; 51 years ago
- Closed: October 31, 2026
- Developer: Frederick Watson
- Manager: Spinoso Real Estate Group
- Num. of stores: 117
- Num. of anchor tenants: 3 (1 open, 2 vacant)
- Floor area: 859,399 square feet (79,841 m^{2})
- Floors: 2
- Parking: 5,200 spaces
- Public transit: DART

Valley West Mall was an enclosed super-regional shopping mall in West Des Moines, Iowa. At the time of its closure, it was anchored by JCPenney and had two vacant anchor stores formerly occupied by Younkers and Von Maur.

== History ==
Frederick Watson, a developer from Minneapolis, Minnesota, first unveiled plans for Valley West Mall in 1971. The Meredith Corporation initially objected to the mall since it was right next to a site where Meredith planned to build its new corporate headquarters, but Meredith withdrew its plan to relocate there in June 1971. A dispute with Dayton Hudson Corporation over plans to put a Dayton's department store at Valley West Mall also delayed construction. After Davenport-based Petersen Harned Von Maur signed a lease agreement to anchor the mall in mid-1974, Dayton Hudson unsuccessfully sued Watson, claiming it was promised a spot in the mall. The legal battle against Dayton Hudson also led to a delay in signing a third anchor store after Von Maur and Omaha-based Brandeis, as JCPenney refused to sign a lease agreement until the suit was settled. Valley West Mall opened August 4, 1975, with about 20 stores and its first anchor, Brandeis. The mall's grand opening ceremony was held on July 28, 1976, with the opening of the second anchor, Petersen Harned Von Maur, and an additional 40 specialty stores. JCPenney, the third anchor, opened in March 1977 to complete the mall. Brandeis was acquired by Younkers in 1987. Petersen Harned Von Maur changed its name to Von Maur in 1989. By 2000, Valley West was the Des Moines area's most-visited mall with an average of 40,000 shoppers per day.

Plans for a fourth anchor store at Valley West Mall were announced on two separate occasions but never materialized. In March 1999, Dillard's signed a letter of intent with Watson Centers to build a $30 million store and parking ramp, but the letter of intent expired in August 2000, and Dillard's located in the new Jordan Creek Town Center instead. In May 2001, Galyan's (now Dick's Sporting Goods) announced a plan to build an 84,000-square-foot (7,800 m^{2}) anchor store, but by January 2003, it backed out of its plan to enter the Des Moines market.

A food court was added to the mall in 1998, replacing a vacated Dunham's Sports.

While Jordan Creek was under construction, Valley West underwent an interior renovation that was completed in August 2003.

On April 18, 2018, it was announced that Younkers would be closing as the parent, Bon-Ton Stores, was going out of business. The store closed on August 29, 2018. On August 24, 2021, it was announced that Von Maur would close its store at Valley West Mall in 2022 in favor opening a new one at Jordan Creek Town Center.

On October 1, 2026, the remaining 17 tenants of Valley West Mall were notified that the Mall's last operating day would be October 31, 2026, marking an end to 51 years of operation. JCPenney, the mall's last remaining anchor store has a lease to operate at Valley West Mall until 2032. As of November 2026, a lawsuit by the defunct mall's owner and a countersuit by JCPenney have been filed to determine the fate of the last anchor store.

=== Legal issues ===
On December 24, 1998, a group of activists passed out handbills outside of Valley West Mall's JCPenney store that accused Phillips-Van Heusen, whose clothing line was sold at JCPenney, of promoting sweatshop conditions. The activists were removed by West Des Moines police and arrested for trespassing. Two of them sued the city of West Des Moines and took their case to the Iowa Supreme Court, arguing that malls like Valley West had become large public gathering places where they had the right to freedom of speech. West Des Moines, on the other hand, argued that Valley West was a private property and the owners would lose control of their property if handbill distribution was allowed. On April 3, 2002, the Iowa Supreme Court ruled in favor of West Des Moines.

Valley West Mall and Merle Hay Mall were plaintiffs in a lawsuit against the city of West Des Moines over the construction of Jordan Creek Town Center. The suit, which claimed that West Des Moines was illegally using tax increment financing money to improve the infrastructure around Jordan Creek, was dismissed by the Iowa Supreme Court on February 27, 2002.
