= Northpark Mall (Mississippi) =

Northpark
- Location: Ridgeland, Mississippi, United States
- Coordinates: 32°24′10″N 90°07′45″W
- Opened: September 12, 1984
- Developer: Cadillac Fairview
- Manager: Pacific Retail Capital Partners
- Owner: Pacific Retail Capital Partners
- Num. of stores: 120
- Num. of anchor tenants: 4
- Floor area: 958,000 square feet (89,000 m^{2})
- Floors: 2

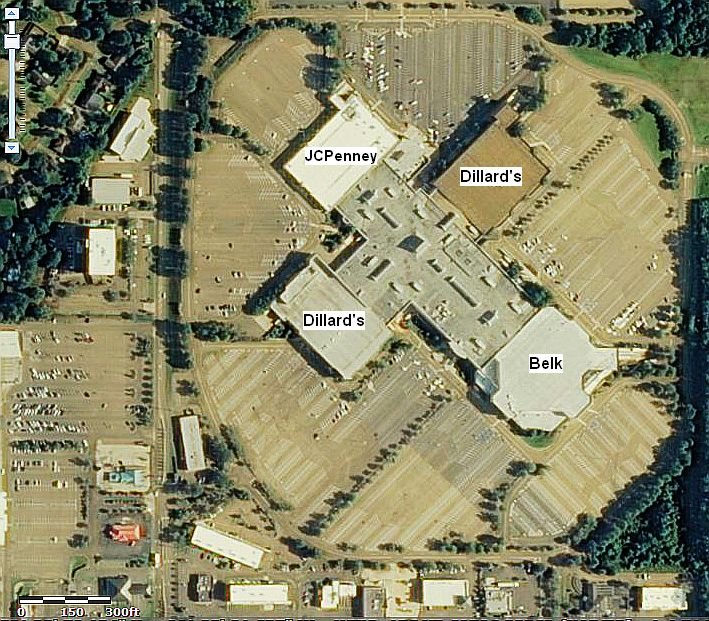
Aerial view of Northpark Mall with anchor tenants in 2014

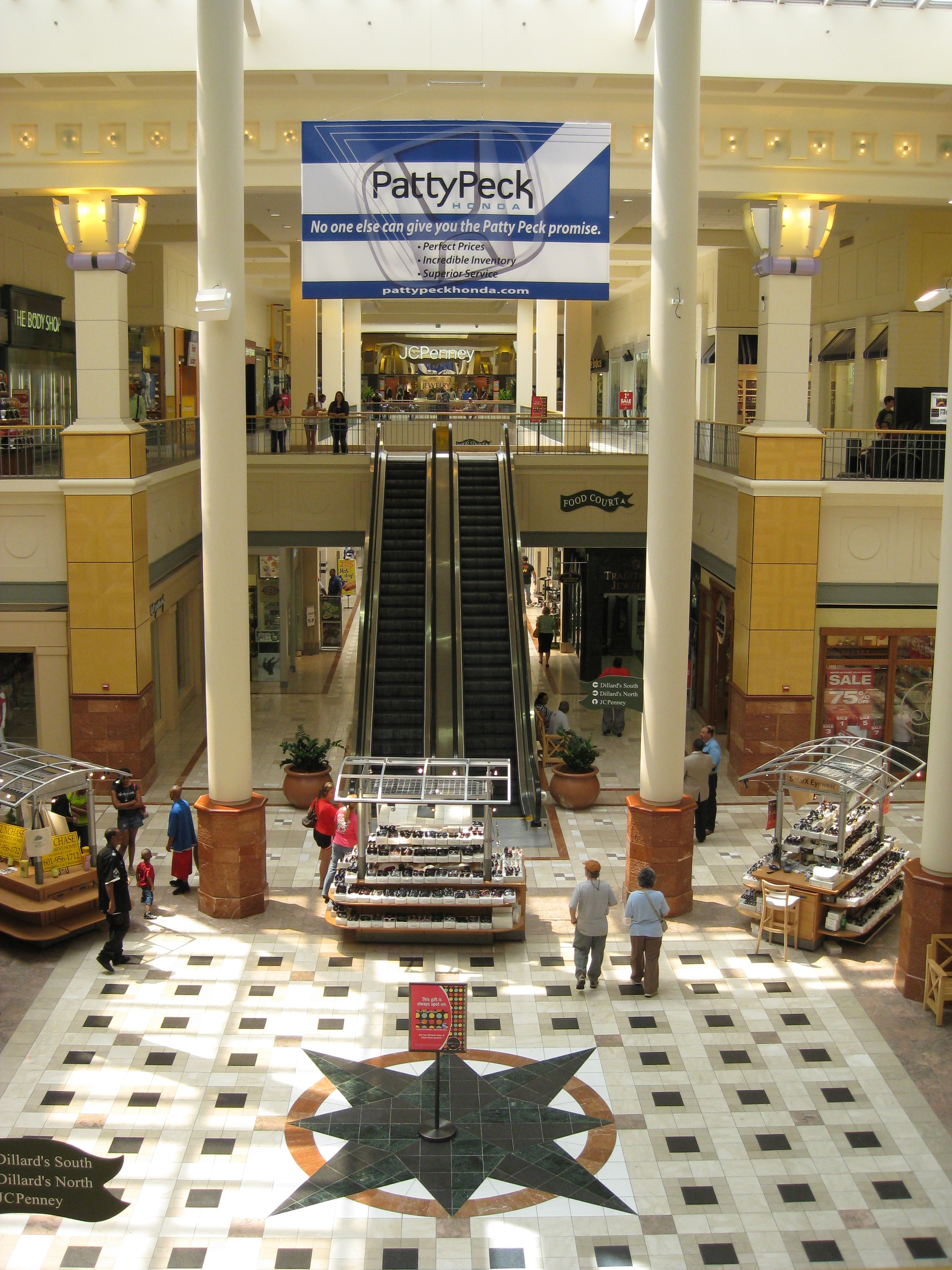
Center Court, June 2010

Northpark is a two-level enclosed shopping mall located on County Line Road in Ridgeland, Mississippi, United States. It is managed and co-owned by Pacific Retail Capital Partners. Mississippi’s premier indoor shopping destination, Northpark is home to more than 120 stores and specialty shops. Northpark recently completed a redevelopment.

== History ==
The mall officially opened on September 12, 1984 with four anchors — Jackson-based McRae's, Gayfers, D.H. Holmes, and JCPenney. The mall also has a cinema located in the back of the mall, originally a 10-screen operation, which later expanded to a 14-screen state-of-the-art setup under Regal Entertainment Group's United Artists Theatres brand, but was sold in September 2018 and closed in early 2019. The cinema reopened in 2020 after extensive renovations with B&B Theatres. The anchor stores currently are JCPenney, 2 Dillard's stores, and Belk.

The mall was built by Cadillac Fairview, who sold it to the Mills Corporation in 2003.

Northpark's initial success took most of the remaining business from the struggling Jackson Mall, south of the Madison-Hinds county line in North Jackson, which had opened in 1969 with three anchors. JCPenney and Gayfers were two, both relocating to Northpark in 1985, while Woolco closed prior to Northpark's opening. Jackson Mall has since been redeveloped as a medical mall, providing health care for the inner city urban poor. Theories exist that the mall's success, taking away from the draw of the Metrocenter Mall in West Jackson, which opened six years earlier, was considered to be the largest shopping mall in Mississippi, and had no great draw to replace it, greatly contributed to the decline of both South and West Jackson over the next few decades.

Northpark’s current direct competitor is Renaissance at Colony Park, an old world Mediterranean influenced lifestyle center also located in Ridgeland. When the Renaissance opened in March 2008, prominent tenants located in Northpark, including Ann Taylor Loft, Williams-Sonoma, American Eagle, and others relocated from Northpark to Renaissance. Northpark’s former direct competition was Metrocenter Mall, which closed in 2018, and the Outlets of Mississippi in nearby Pearl at the intersection of I-55 & I-20. This shopping center was completed in 2013. Other competitors include Dogwood Festival Market and Market Street Flowood, which are across from each other at Lakeland Drive (MS 25) and East Metro Parkway in nearby Flowood.

In the midst of a volatile local market, a downturn came at Metrocenter in April 1999 when its Gayfers anchor closed due to the Dillard's buyout of Gayfers' parent company, Mercantile Stores. Another blow came in 2004 when Dillard's announced they were closing its Metrocenter location, and consolidating operations to its Northpark locations — anchor spaces at the ends of the mall's north and south wings, acquired via D.H. Holmes and Gayfers.

A third anchor conversion came in March 2006, as all McRae's stores, including the stores at Northpark and Metrocenter, were rebranded by Belk. Both the McRae's and Proffitt's chains had been purchased by Belk in late 2005. Belk at Metrocenter closed in August 2009. This boosted patronage at the Northpark and Dogwood Festival Market locations.

== See also ==
- Outlets of Mississippi
- Metrocenter Mall (Jackson, Mississippi)
- Dogwood Festival Market
