= Edgewater Mall =

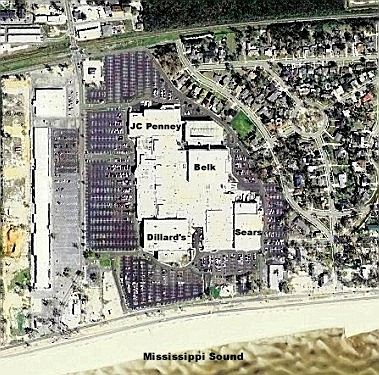
- Aerial view of Edgewater Mall and anchor stores in 2013
- Location: Biloxi, Mississippi, United States
- Coordinates: 30.390°N 88.988°W
- Address: 2600 Beach Boulevard
- Opened: 1963
- Developer: Holcomb & Milner
- Owner: Jim Wilson & Associates
- Num. of stores: 100+
- Num. of anchor tenants: 4
- Floor area: 843,652 square feet (78,000 m^{2})
- Floors: 1 (2 in Belk and Dillards, 4 in Parking Garage)
- Public transit: CTA

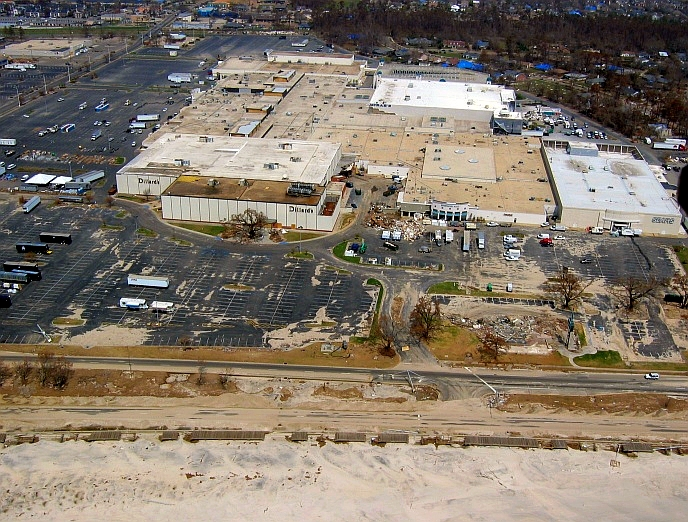
Edgewater Mall, two weeks after Hurricane Katrina

Edgewater Mall is an enclosed shopping mall located in Biloxi, Mississippi, United States. Opened in 1963, its anchor stores are Belk, Dillard's, JCPenney, and Premiere Cinemas.

== History ==
As the first enclosed mall in the state of Mississippi, The mall opened in 1963 as Edgewater Plaza. Among its first tenants were Godchaux's, Gayfers, and J. J. Newberry. In the early 1970s, the mall was expanded with a new wing ending at Sears. The addition of this wing required the demolition of the Edgewater Gulf Hotel. Sears opened in July 1972. J. J. Newberry closed in 1979 and became JCPenney the same year. McCrory Stores operated a dime store in the mall until 1996.

A year later, the mall underwent a major expansion and renovation program that included the addition of McRae's (now Belk) as an anchor, along with the expansion of the JCPenney and Sears stores. A second story was added to the Sears store, while the JCPenney store was expanded into a space previously occupied by a Jitney Jungle supermarket. The Gayfers chain was sold to Dillard's in 1998.

The mall was damaged by Hurricane Katrina in 2005. Sears was the first store to reopen after the hurricane. Dillard's, which suffered the most damage from the hurricane, was rebuilt and did not reopen until 2008.

In June 2017, Sears announced that its store at the mall would close in September 2017, dropping the number of anchors from 4 to 3. In November 2018, Premiere Cinemas opened in the former Sears location.

== See also ==
- Outlets of Mississippi
- Northpark Mall (Mississippi)
- Metrocenter Mall (Jackson, Mississippi)
