= Metro Center =

MetroCentre, Metro Centre, MetroCenter, or Metro Center may refer to:

== City centers ==
- Metro Center, Springfield, Massachusetts, the original, colonial settlement of the City of Springfield, Massachusetts

== Halls ==
- Metro Hall, a complex of three buildings in Toronto, Ontario, Canada including Metro Hall

== Shopping malls ==
- MetroCentre (shopping centre), a large shopping and leisure centre located in Gateshead, United Kingdom
- Metrocenter Mall (Jackson, Mississippi), a shopping mall in Jackson, Mississippi, USA
- Metrocenter (Phoenix, Arizona), a shopping mall in Phoenix, Arizona, USA

== Venues ==
- MetroCenter (Arlington, Texas), a venue in Arlington, Texas, USA
- Scotiabank Centre (formerly known as the Halifax Metro Centre), a venue in Halifax, Nova Scotia, Canada
- Rockford MetroCentre, a venue in Rockford, Illinois, USA

== Railway stations ==
- Metro Center station in Washington D.C., US
- MetroCentre railway station in Gateshead, UK
- 7th Street/Metro Center station in Los Angeles, California, US
- T-Centralen metro station in Stockholm, Sweden
