= Southgate Mall (Missoula) =

Shopping mall located in Missoula, Montana

Coordinates: 46°50′46.09″N 114°1′38.02″W

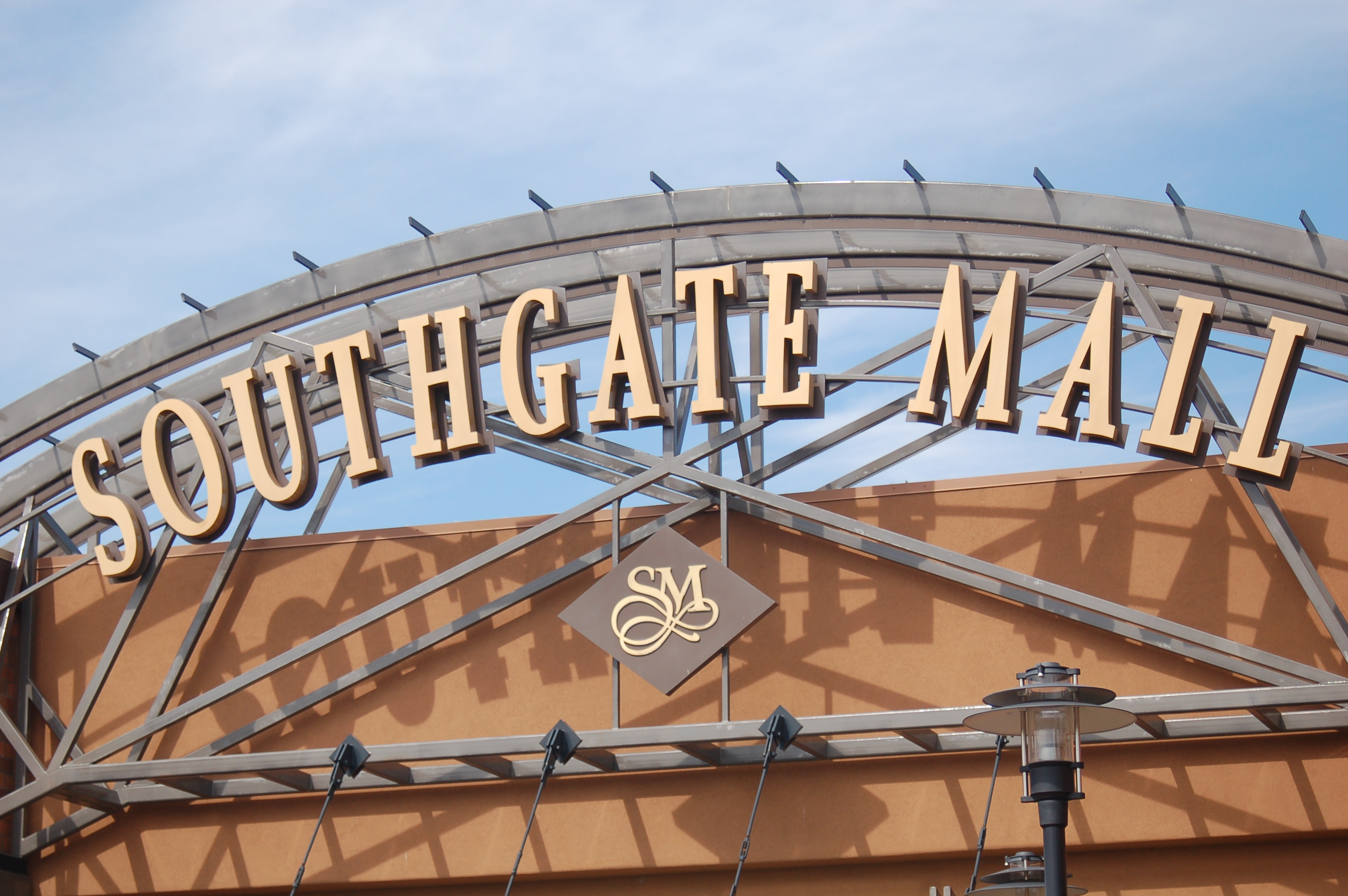
- Sign above the main entrance
- Location: Missoula, Montana
- Opened: August 2, 1978; 48 years ago
- Developer: George Lambros
- Manager: CBL Properties
- Owner: CBL Properties
- Num. of stores: 85
- Num. of anchor tenants: 6 (4 open; 1 vacant; 1 under construction)
- Floor area: 398,000 sq ft (37,000 m^{2})
- Floors: 1
- Website: southgatemall.com

Southgate Mall is a shopping mall located in Missoula, Montana. The shopping center originally opened in August 1978 with Hart-Albin, Hennessy's, Nordstrom Place Two and Sears as anchor stores. Today, the mall is anchored by AMC Theatres, two Dillard's stores, and Scheels All Sports. An adjacent strip mall is anchored by Bob Ward's and Cost Plus World Market.

Southgate Mall is recognized as the largest enclosed shopping area in the region of Western Montana.

== History ==
=== Development and opening ===
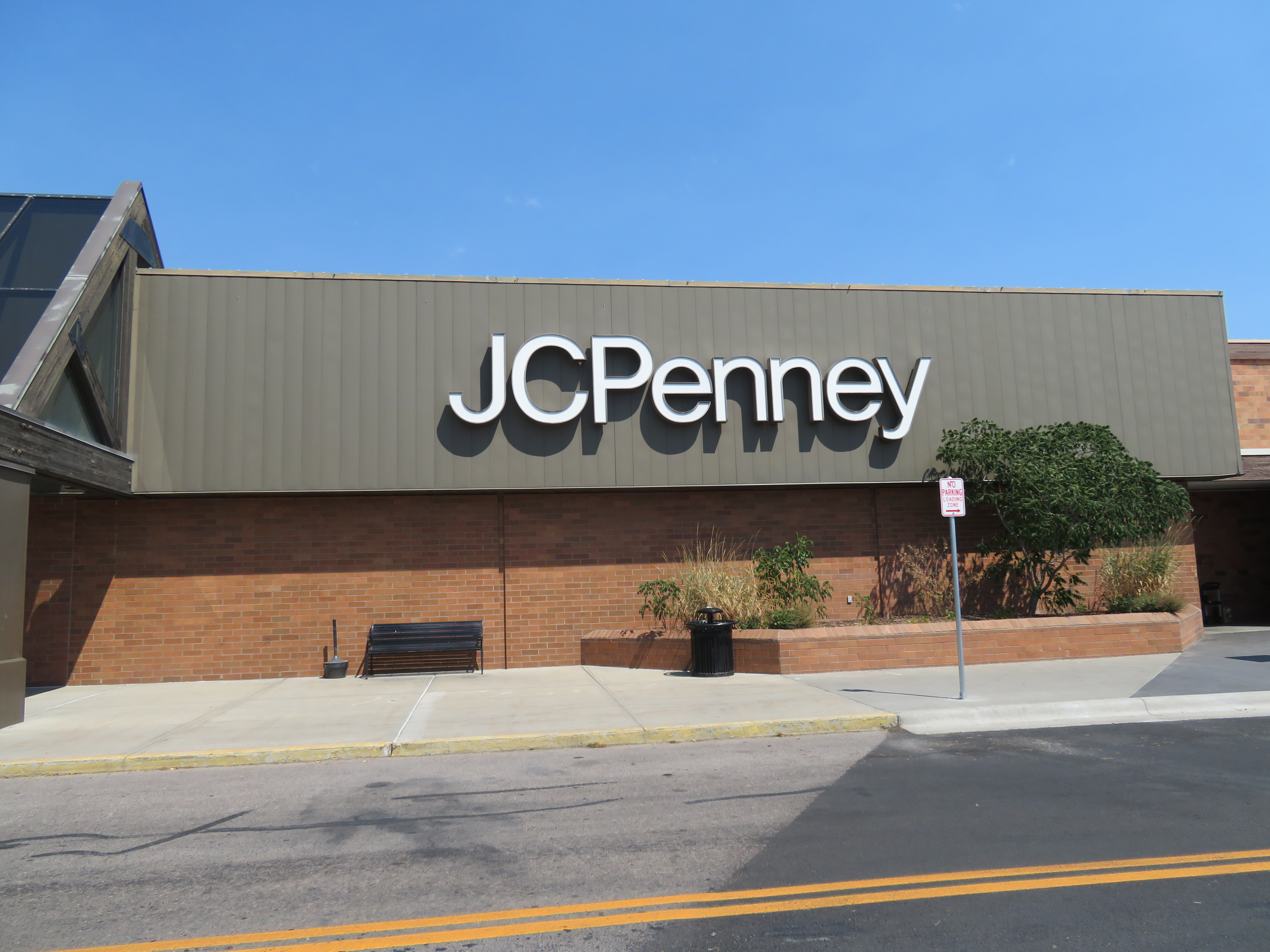
JCPenney store at Southgate Mall in 2017, before its closure in 2020

The idea for an enclosed shopping mall in Missoula dates back to 1973, when Erickson Development Co., a Minnesota-based development firm, proposed a $15 million regional shopping center south of Buckhouse Bridge, along U.S. Highway 93.

On February 9, 1977, developer George Lambros revealed plans to build a 398,000 square-foot shopping mall on 68 acres between U.S. Highway 93 and South Avenue in Missoula. The Missoula City Council approved Lambors' plans on February 14, with construction expected to begin April 1. On May 10, Hart-Albin, Hennessy's and Sears were confirmed as anchor stores. An additional anchor, a two-level Nordstrom Place Two store, was confirmed in March 1978. In July, after months of speculation, J. C. Penney was confirmed as the anchor for the mall's planned second phase.

Southgate Mall's first tenant, Kings Table Restaurant, opened on June 28, 1978, with Sears following on July 12 and Hart-Albin on July 27. Southgate Mall held its grand opening ceremony on August 2. The mall's second phase, which added an additional 25 stores and anchor J. C. Penney, was completed between August and November 1979. In August 1983, Pay 'n Save and Ernst Home Centers were added to the mall in a detached building south of the existing structure.

In February 1987, Pay 'n Save announced the closure of its Southgate Mall store. Another anchor store, Nordstrom Place Two, announced its closure in November 1988. In April 1989, Hart-Albin relocated to the former Nordstrom Place Two building. However, this new store was shut down just three months later. Hart-Albin's original space was replaced by Lamonts in August 1989. In April 1990, the vacant Pay 'n Save store was replaced with Fabricland. By mid-1996, a Bob Ward's sporting goods store was constructed adjacent to the Fabricland and Ernst complex.

=== Later years ===
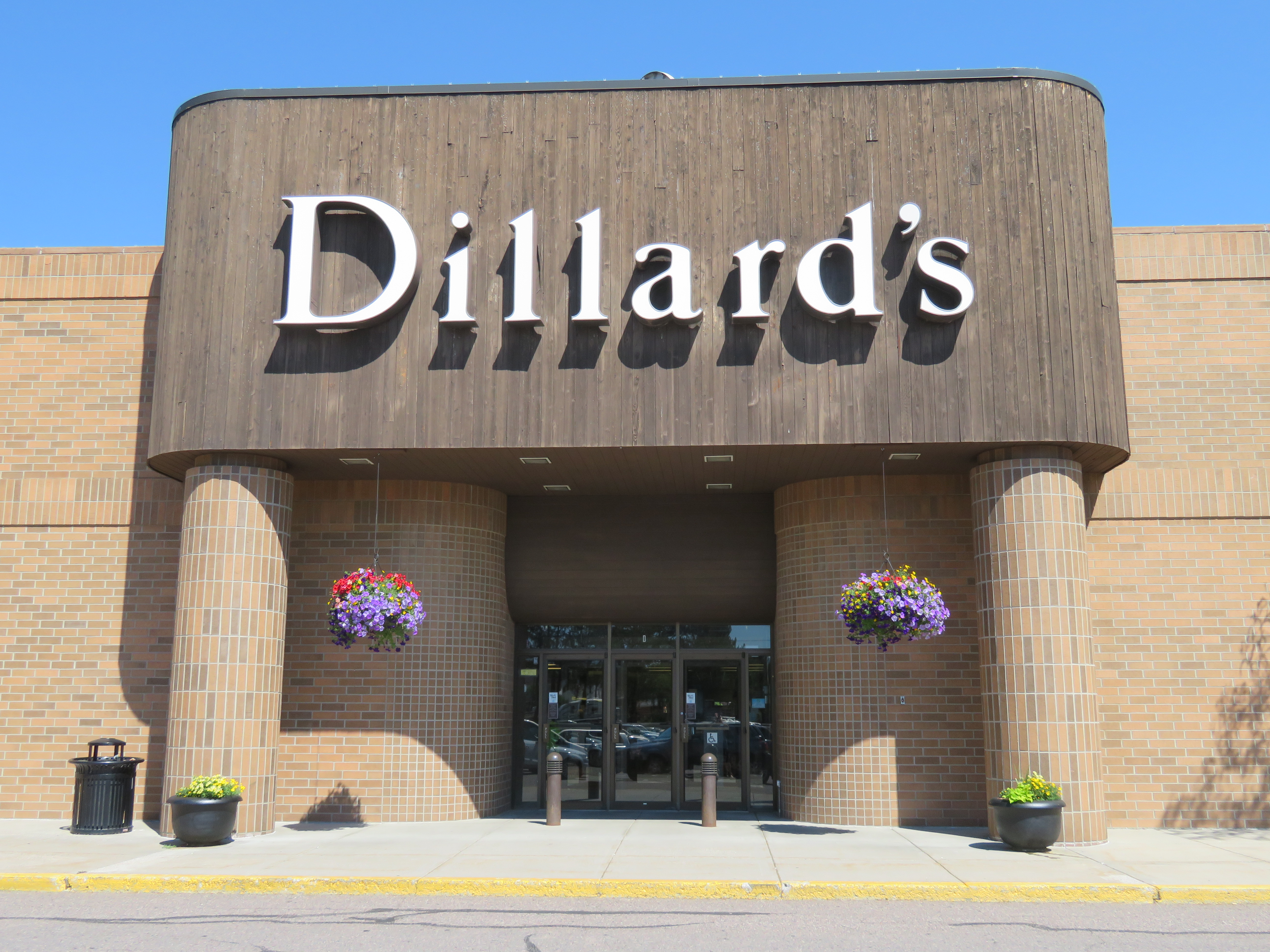
Dillard's (formerly Hennessy's) at Southgate Mall in 2018

In October 1996, Lamonts announced plans to close as part of the company's Chapter 11 bankruptcy reorganization effort. One month later, Ernst Home Centers announced plans to liquidate and close all 53 stores. Fabricland also exited the mall, in July 1998. Later in 1998, Hennessy's was rebranded as Dillard's, following the retailer's acquisition of Hennessy's parent company Mercantile Stores. By the end of the year, two Herberger's stores were added to the mall, replacing the vacant Lamonts and Hart-Albin spaces.

Bed Bath & Beyond was added to the mall in 2007, replacing Fabricland. Cost Plus World Market was added to the mall in early 2014, replacing Ashley HomeStore. In March 2015, Sears announced the closure of its Southgate Mall store. Montana's first H&M store opened at the mall in September 2015.

Plans for a $64 million renovation and expansion the Southgate Mall were announced in 2015. In April 2016, AMC Theatres (then known as Carmike Cinemas) announced plans to build a 900-seat dine-in movie theater at the mall. The 45,000 square-foot theater will be built between the Mustard Seed restaurant and the former Sears property. In February 2017, Lucky's Market confirmed plans to open a grocery store in a 32,000 square-foot portion of the Sears building. Construction on the mall expansion was completed in 2018. In April 2018, Herberger's parent company The Bon-Ton announced it will liquidate and close all 267 stores. Plans for a second Dillard's store, replacing the Herberger's store in the center of the mall, were announced in February 2019.

On January 17, 2020, it was announced that J. C. Penney would also be closing on April 24 as part of a plan to close 6 stores nationwide. Four days later, Lucky's Market announced it will close in February. On January 24, 2020, Scheels All Sports announced it will replace J. C. Penney. Scheels All Sports opened on October 2, 2021. In October 2021, Hobby Lobby secured a building permit to renovate the former Lucky's Market space for a new store.

On August 4, 2025, Washington Prime Group sold the Southgate Mall to CBL Properties.
