= Metrocenter Mall (Jackson, Mississippi) =

Defunct mall in Jackson, Mississippi, U.S.

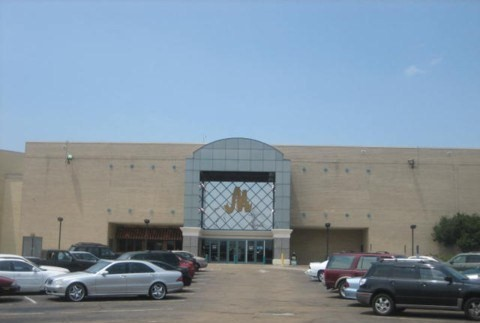
- Location: Jackson, Mississippi, United States
- Coordinates: 32°17′59″N 90°15′6″W
- Opened: March 1, 1978; 48 years ago
- Closed: August 15, 2018; 8 years ago
- Developer: Jim Wilson & Associates and Homart Development Co.
- Manager: The Overby Company
- Owner: Randy Travis
- Architect: Evan Terry Associates
- Num. of stores: 60
- Num. of anchor tenants: All vacant
- Floor area: 1,250,000 sq ft (116,000 m^{2})
- Floors: 2

Metrocenter Mall is a defunct shopping mall located in Jackson, Mississippi, United States. The largest enclosed shopping mall in Mississippi, it contained 1,250,000 square feet of retail space on two levels, including four anchor spaces. Regional real estate developer Jim Wilson & Associates built the mall in Mississippi's capital city in 1978, as one of its portfolio of properties throughout the southeastern United States. The mall is located near the junction of Interstate 20 and Interstate 220/U.S. Highway 49, along West Jackson's U.S. Highway 80 corridor. After years of ownership by Cannon Management and Jackson Metrocenter Limited, a decade-long decline at the mall led to a foreclosure in November 2012, and subsequent sale to Metrocenter Mall, LLC. The mall itself is closed and empty. The last tenant was City of Jackson offices, which were located in the former Belk anchor store. The City left after complaints of facility deterioration. There are 3 other vacant anchor stores that were once Sears, Burlington, and Dillard's.

== History ==
When Metrocenter opened March 1, 1978, it was considered to be the largest mall in Mississippi with over 100 services and stores on two levels. The mall opened with three anchor department stores, Jackson-based McRae's, Alabama-based Gayfers, and national retailer Sears. New Orleans–based D.H. Holmes was added as the fourth department store anchor in May 1979. Restaurants were inside two of the department stores — Potpourri Restaurant inside D.H. Holmes, and Widow Watson's inside McRae's. Metrocenter also had a Service Merchandise, a specialty outlet of the Jackson-based Jitney-Jungle supermarket chain, and Mississippi's only General Cinema theater as outparcels, and took away most of the business of Jackson Mall, which opened in 1969 with JCPenney, Gayfers, and Woolco as its anchors, in North Jackson. Metrocenter continued to enjoy success after Northpark Mall opened north of the county line in Ridgeland in 1984.

In 1993, the mall received a new makeover, which added a new center court with a skylight, a revamped food court, new entrances, and new stores.

== Former anchors ==
D.H. Holmes was acquired by and converted to Arkansas-based Dillard's in 1989, bringing with it the closure of the Potpourri Restaurant. A decade later, Dillard's acquired Gayfers by way of a buyout of its parent Mercantile Stores in 1999. McRae's was sold in 2006, and its Metrocenter store rebranded to Belk that year. Sears was the only original anchor to remain until its closure.

== Decline and closure ==
Metrocenter began to decline in 1999, when the first of the mall's anchor department stores closed. Dillard's, which had acquired two of the mall's anchor spaces by 1999, continued to operate in the former D.H. Holmes space while closing the Gayfer's space. Dillard's remained in the mall until 2004, leaving two active department store anchors at Metrocenter. Within 2006, one of the anchors—McRae's—was sold to Belk, which assumed the anchor and rebranded the store as Belk. A steady pattern of vacancies continued until 2007, when Burlington Coat Factory opened in the first level of the former Gayfers property to great fanfare, drawing patrons from more than 90 miles away. Statistics show traffic had increased at Metrocenter by as much as 3,000 cars per day.

Despite the addition, changing demographics in the Jackson metropolitan area contributed to substantial vacancies. By June 2009, Belk announced its intent to close the company's Metrocenter's location in August, in order to focus on suburban properties at Ridgeland's Northpark Mall and Flowood’s Dogwood Festival Market.

The year's end brought a 6–1 vote during a December 2009 meeting of Jackson's city council, to purchase the former D.H. Holmes/Dillard's property for $39,500, in hopes of spurring a revitalization of West Jackson.

The former McRae's/Belk property was sold in July 2010 to Retro Metro, LLC, with plans to divide the one-time anchor between offices for the City of Jackson on the first level, and a mixed-use redevelopment in the second level that included offices, restaurants, and retail space. Watkins Partners, a Jackson-area real estate developer, announced intentions to move forward with Project Retro Metro in December 2010 and started with its mixed-use redevelopment in January 2011. David Watkins, president of Watkins Partners, said, "Metrocenter has plummeted."

Despite many efforts to redevelop Metrocenter, Sears Holdings announced in late November 2011 that over 100 of its Kmart and Sears properties would close, including the Sears store at Metrocenter. The last of the mall's department store anchors, Sears closed in January 2012. After the City offices left in 2024 the mall became completely empty and unused.

On August 15, 2018, Metrocenter closed its doors, though Burlington and parts of the building that held city offices remained open.

On February 9, 2022, it was announced that Burlington would close its doors at this location, making the mall void of any retail store. On May 17, the location closed its doors for the final time.

== See also ==
- Outlets of Mississippi
- Northpark Mall (Mississippi)
