= Outlets of Mississippi =

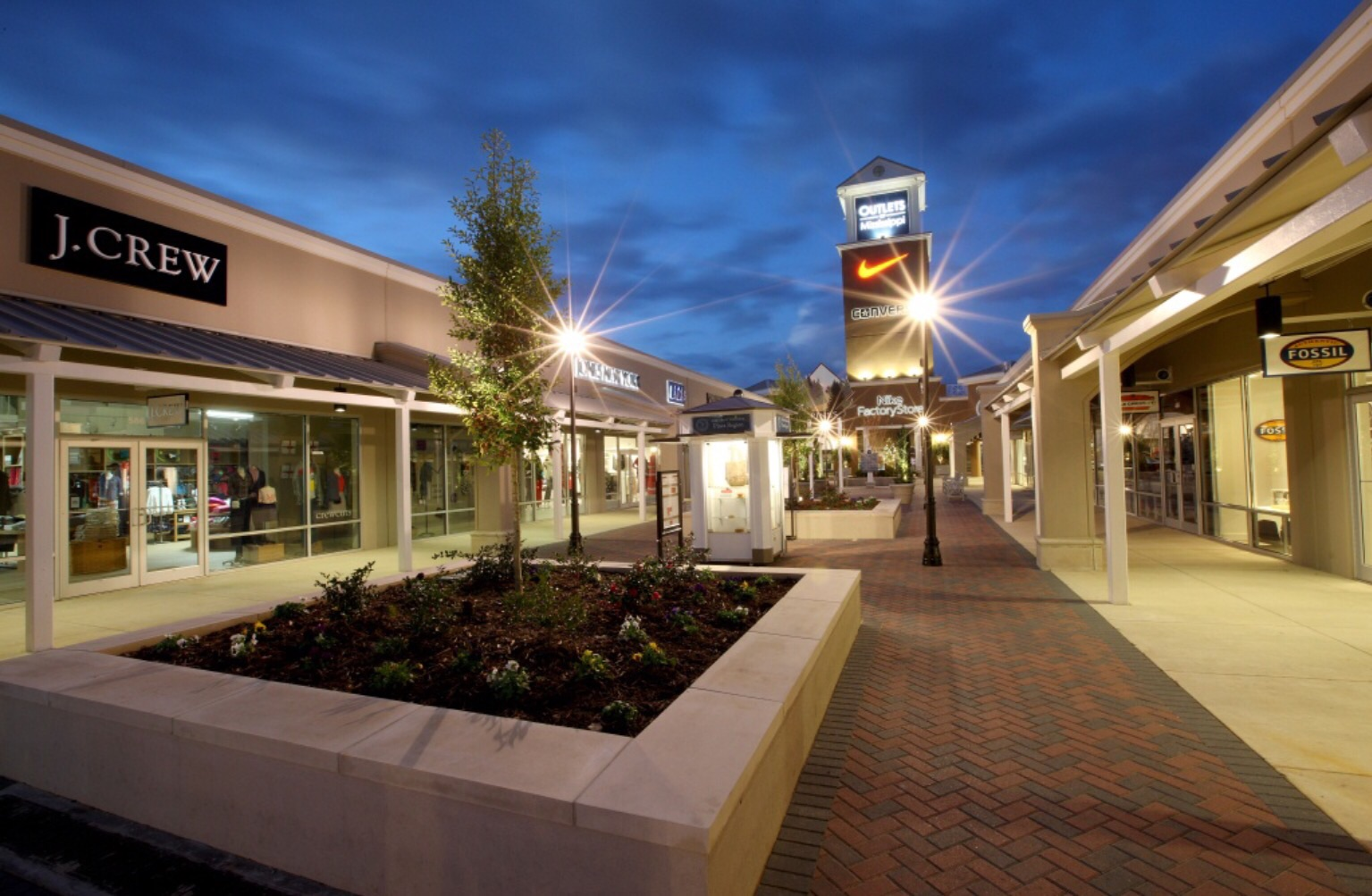
- Location: Pearl, Mississippi, United States
- Coordinates: 32.27423°N 90.15316°W
- Address: 200 Bass Pro Drive
- Manager: FFO Realty Advisors
- Owner: Spectrum Capital LLC
- Num. of stores: 80+
- Num. of anchor tenants: 1
- Floor area: 325,000 sq ft (30,200 m^{2})
- Floors: 1
- Website: www.outletsofms.com

Outlets of Mississippi is an outdoor outlet mall located just north of the intersection of U.S. Route 49 and Interstate 20 in Pearl, Mississippi, United States, approximately 3.5 miles east of Downtown Jackson. More than 30,000 people attended the grand opening of the mall in late November 2013. The mall is anchored by Forever 21. The mall boasts 76 stores, and is one of the state's largest shopping malls.

== See also ==
- Northpark Mall (Mississippi)
- Metrocenter Mall (Jackson, Mississippi)
- Tanger Outlets Southaven
