= Hennessy's =

American department store

D.J. Hennessy Company
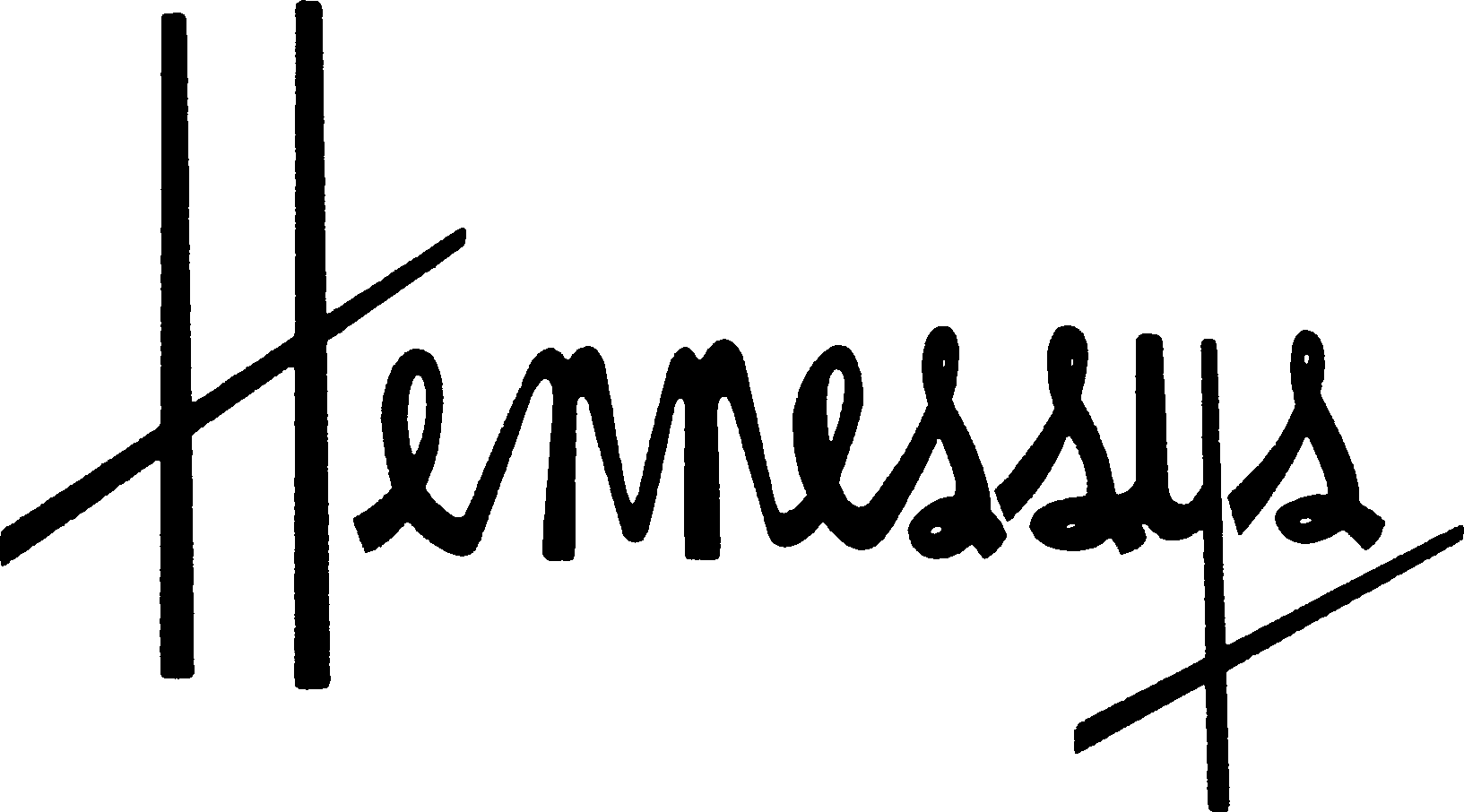
- Company type: Department store
- Industry: Retail
- Founded: 1898; 128 years ago Butte, Montana
- Defunct: 1998; 28 years ago
- Fate: Acquired by Dillard's
- Headquarters: Billings, Montana
- Products: Clothing, footwear, bedding, furniture, jewelry, beauty products, and housewares.

Hennessy's was an American department store, founded by Daniel Hennessy of Butte, Montana in 1898. Stores opened throughout Montana. In the 1970s, the company was acquired by Mercantile Stores and the headquarters moved to Billings, Montana. When Mercantile Stores was acquired by Dillard's in 1998, the 100-year-old name was retired in favor for Dillard's.

== History ==
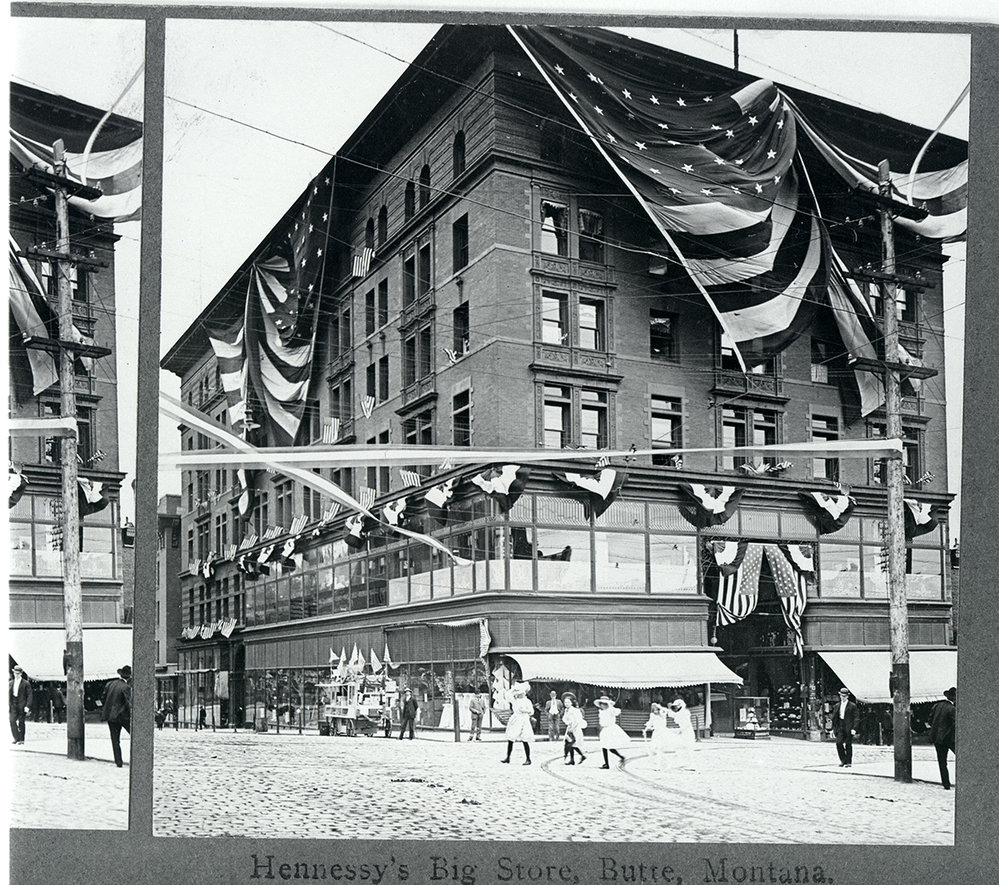
Hennessy’s Department store in Butte, Montana, circa 1908

Hennessy's history began when "Copper King" Marcus Daly, a powerful businessman from Butte, Montana, had a falling out with his business associate in Missoula, Montana, lumberman A.B. Hammond. Daly decided that Butte needed a store that would compete with Hammond's Missoula Mercantile to sell goods to miners in Butte and lumbermen in Missoula. He found fellow businessman, Daniel Hennessy. Hennessy owned and operated a successful store in Butte. With financial backing from Daly, Hennessy hired Frederick Kees, an architect from Minneapolis, to design one of Butte's most elegant buildings.

Hennessy's department store opened for business in 1898. Inside, shoppers encountered marble staircases, oak counters, and solid bronze balustrades. Customers found every type of merchandise in 17 different departments from the basement level, up through the first three floors. At its opening, the Butte Hennessy's store employed 200 people. The upper floors of the original Hennessy Building in Butte became the headquarters for the Anaconda Company.

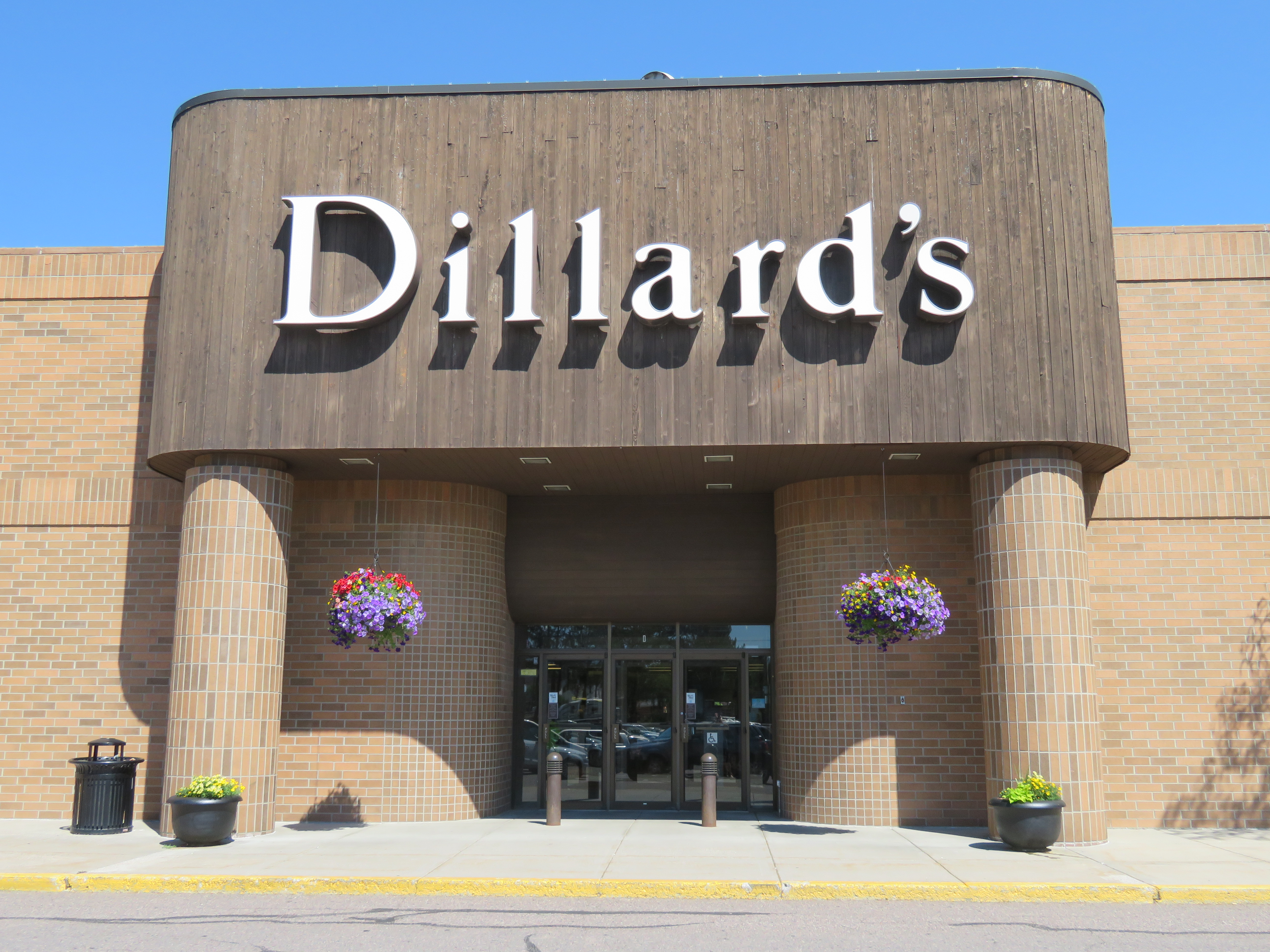
Former Hennessy's store at Southgate Mall in Missoula.

Hennessy's stores expanded from Butte into locations in Missoula, Billings, and Helena. The chain was acquired by Mercantile Stores in the 1970s and headquarters moved to Billings in 1980. The Hennessy's chain closed the Butte store in February 1980 after years of difficult business. In 1998 Dillard's acquired Mercantile Stores and the Hennessy's brand was dropped in favor of Dillard's. At this time Hennessy's operated three stores in Helena, Billings, and Missoula.

The Hennessy building in Butte later was owned by the Montana Power Company, which dissolved and became Touch America, a telecommunications entity. When Touch America went out of business, the building was purchased in 2003 by Lawrence C. and Cynthia K. Farrar of Butte, Montana. It now is office space for multiple businesses and where Paramount placed offices during the filming of 1923, the sequel to the popular series, Yellowstone.
