= Southaven, Mississippi =

- City
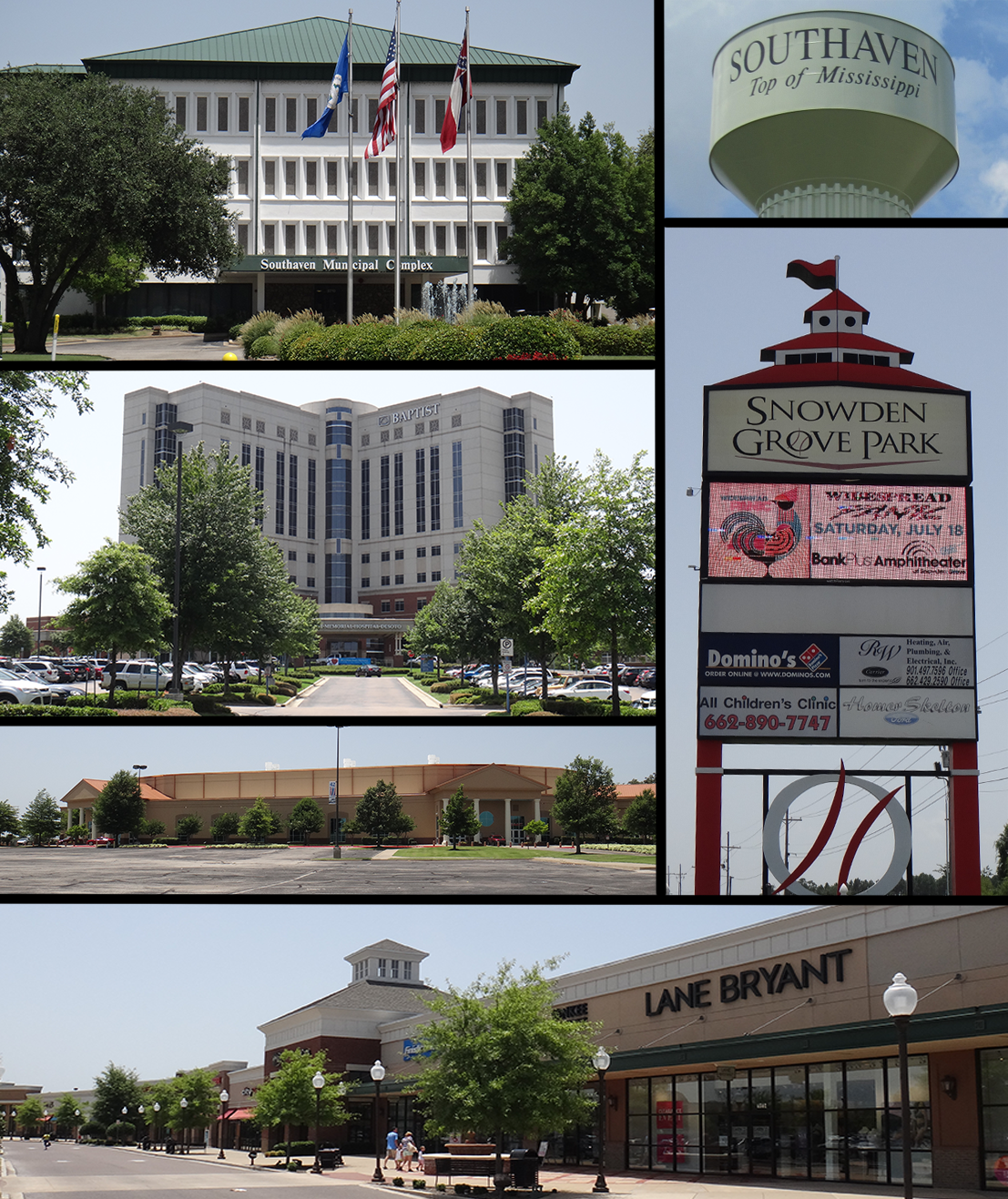
- Anti-clockwise from top: Southaven City Hall, Baptist Memorial Hospital-DeSoto, Landers Center, Southaven Towne Center, Snowden Grove Park, and the water tower in Southaven

- Flag Seal Logo
- Nicknames: The Top of Mississippi; The Tip of the ‘Sip
- Interactive map of Southaven, Mississippi
- Location within Mississippi Location within the United States
- Coordinates: 34.9510°N 89.9777°W
- Country: United States
- State: Mississippi
- County: DeSoto
- Incorporated: April 15, 1980
- Founder: Kemmons Wilson

Government
  - Type: Mayor–council
  - Body: Board of Aldermen
  - Mayor: Darren Musselwhite (R)

Area
  - City: 41.502 sq mi (107.490 km^{2})
  - Land: 41.298 sq mi (106.961 km^{2})
  - Water: 0.20 sq mi (0.53 km^{2}) 0.49%
- Elevation: 322 ft (98 m)

Population (2020)
  - City: 54,648
  - Estimate (2024): 57,493
  - Rank: US: 712nd MS: 3rd
  - Density: 1,323.3/sq mi (510.92/km^{2})
  - Urban: 1,056,190 (US: 45th)
  - Metro: 1,341,412 (US: 45th)
- Demonym: Jago
- Time zone: UTC−6 (Central (CST))
  - Summer (DST): UTC−5 (CDT)
- ZIP Codes: 38671–38672
- Area codes: 662 and 471
- FIPS code: 28-69280
- GNIS feature ID: 2405496
- Website: southaven.org

Southaven is a city in DeSoto County, Mississippi, United States. It is a principal city in the Greater Memphis. The population was 54,648 at the 2020 census, and was estimated at 57,493 in 2024, making it the third-most populous city in Mississippi and the largest suburb of Memphis by population. Southaven surpassed Bartlett, Tennessee as Memphis' largest suburb by population according to the 2024 Census estimates. Southaven is traversed north to south by the I-55/I-69 freeway. The city's name derives from the fact that Southaven is located south of Whitehaven, a neighborhood in Memphis.

== History ==
Southaven began as a village when Memphis homebuilder Kemmons Wilson (founder of Holiday Inn) wished to develop a few residential subdivisions featuring small starter homes just across the Mississippi border from what was then Whitehaven, Tennessee, an unincorporated area just a few miles south of the Memphis city limits. Memphis eventually annexed Whitehaven in the 1970s. Officially incorporated in 1980, Southaven is one of the fastest-growing cities in the southeastern United States. In just 20 years, Southaven doubled its land area, while its population tripled.

The construction of Interstate 55 through Southaven in the 1970s helped to promote growth and make for easier access to the city from Memphis, Jackson, St. Louis, and Chicago. Interstate 69, which will eventually run from Canada to Mexico, was cosigned with I-55 in Southaven in 2007.

In 1988, Baptist Hospital-DeSoto opened in Southaven as a two-story hospital. In 2001, Baptist DeSoto started an expansion project, nearly doubling the size of the hospital. In 2002, Baptist Hospital-DeSoto added an Outpatient Diagnostic Center and a Women's Center. In November 2006, Baptist DeSoto opened an eleven-story hospital tower that added 140 beds to the facility, allowing it to offer all private rooms. In addition, the new hospital tower added a new and expanded Emergency Department, more operating suites and space for future additions. It is the first high-rise building constructed in DeSoto County.

The exponential growth of Memphis International Airport (2 miles north of the city limits) in the 1980s led to increased air traffic over Southaven. The city continues to see large amounts of air traffic from Memphis International Airport, as flight paths to both north–south runways lead directly over the city. October 2007 saw the opening of Southaven's first large-scale shopping mall, Southaven Towne Center, which is located just south of Goodman Road between I-55/I-69 and Airways Boulevard. The mall is open-air with various stores and restaurants. Numerous buildings in Southaven were damaged on February 5, 2008, when an EF-2 tornado touched down during the so-called Super Tuesday tornado outbreak. Memphis television station WREG broadcast live images of the tornado as it moved through the city and into Memphis. No fatalities were reported in Southaven. By February 2011, Southaven had become the third-largest city in Mississippi. In the late 2000s, an outlet mall was proposed for Southaven. Tanger Outlets Southaven began construction in January 2015 and opened in November 2015. The mall, located near I-55/I-69 and Church Road, includes 70 outlet stores and outparcels of restaurants. Southaven was the boyhood home of noted novelist John Grisham, who also practiced law there for almost a decade, and of singer-songwriter Cory Branan.

President Donald Trump visited the city of Southaven twice, in 2018 and 2022. He held a campaign rally for Senator Cindy Hyde-Smith's special general election on October 3, 2018. Four years later, the president returned to Southaven to hold another rally (this time on the American Freedom Tour) on June 18, 2022. Both rallies took place at the Landers Center. These campaign rallies were broadcast on national television and garnered attention from news networks, including CNN and Fox News.

=== Data center pollution ===
On July 21, 2025, XAI, a company owned by Elon Musk, has bought a former gas power plant site close to a new AI data center in Memphis. However, Southaven residents had complaints about noise and fear about pollution from its data center turbines. On January 8, 2026, XAI, has announced plans to build a new data center called MACROHARDRR. The company plans to spend $20 billion dollars on its behalf, making its third data center in the Memphis metropolitan area. Regulators from the Mississippi Department of Environmental Quality planned a key meeting on Election Day during the 2026 midterms. The second planned data center faced opposition from its residents over concerns of pollution within the city.

== Geography ==
According to the United States Census Bureau, the city has a total area of 41.502 square miles (107.49 km^{2}), of which 41.298 square miles (106.96 km^{2}) is land and 0.204 square miles (0.53 km^{2}) (0.49%) is water.

The center of the city is approximately 14 miles (23 km) south of downtown Memphis and 6 miles (10 km) southwest of Memphis International Airport.

=== Climate ===
Climate data for Southaven, Mississippi
Month	Jan	Feb	Mar	Apr	May	Jun	Jul	Aug	Sep	Oct	Nov	Dec	Year
Record high °F (°C)	79 (26)	81 (27)	87 (31)	94 (34)	99 (37)	104 (40)	108 (42)	107 (42)	103 (39)	95 (35)	86 (30)	81 (27)	108 (42)
Mean daily maximum °F (°C)	49 (9)	55 (13)	63 (17)	72 (22)	80 (27)	89 (32)	92 (33)	91 (33)	85 (29)	75 (24)	62 (17)	52 (11)	72 (22)
Mean daily minimum °F (°C)	31 (−1)	36 (2)	44 (7)	52 (11)	61 (16)	69 (21)	73 (23)	71 (22)	64 (18)	52 (11)	43 (6)	34 (1)	53 (11)
Record low °F (°C)	−8 (−22)	−11 (−24)	12 (−11)	27 (−3)	38 (3)	48 (9)	52 (11)	48 (9)	36 (2)	25 (−4)	9 (−13)	−13 (−25)	−13 (−25)
Average precipitation inches (mm)	4.24 (108)	4.31 (109)	5.58 (142)	5.79 (147)	5.15 (131)	4.30 (109)	4.22 (107)	3.00 (76)	3.31 (84)	3.31 (84)	5.76 (146)	5.68 (144)	54.65 (1,387)
Average snowfall inches (cm)	2.2 (5.6)	1.9 (4.8)	0.3 (0.76)	0 (0)	0 (0)	0 (0)	0 (0)	0 (0)	0 (0)	0 (0)	0.1 (0.25)	0.1 (0.25)	4.6 (11.66)

Southaven experiences a humid subtropical climate, with average annual precipitation of nearly 55 inches (1,400 mm), which is well distributed throughout the year. April is the wettest month of the year, and August the driest. The average high temperature is 49 °F (9 °C) in January and 92 °F (33 °C) in July.

== Demographics ==
Historical population
Census	Pop.	Note	%±
1970	8,931		—
1980	16,071		79.9%
1990	18,705		16.4%
2000	28,977		54.9%
2010	48,982		69.0%
2020	54,648		11.6%
2025 (est.)	57,819		5.8%
U.S. Decennial Census; 2020 Census

According to realtor website Zillow, the average price of a home as of March 31, 2026, in Southaven is $274,141.

As of the 2024 American Community Survey, there are 21,251 estimated households in Southaven with an average of 2.63 persons per household. The city has a median household income of $78,483. Approximately 12.6% of the city's population lives at or below the poverty line. Southaven has an estimated 65.0% employment rate, with 28.8% of the population holding a bachelor's degree or higher and 92.9% holding a high school diploma. There were 23,046 housing units at an average density of 558.04 per square mile (215.5/km^{2}).

The top five reported languages (people were allowed to report up to two languages, thus the figures will generally add to more than 100%) were English (94.9%), Spanish (3.7%), Indo-European (0.2%), Asian and Pacific Islander (0.8%), and Other (0.3%).

The median age in the city was 36.2 years.

Southaven, Mississippi – racial and ethnic composition Note: the US Census treats Hispanic/Latino as an ethnic category. This table excludes Latinos from the racial categories and assigns them to a separate category. Hispanics/Latinos may be of any race.
Race / ethnicity (NH = non-Hispanic)	Pop. 1990	Pop. 2000	Pop. 2010	Pop 2020	% 1990	% 2000	% 2010	% 2020
White alone (NH)	17,297	25,883	33,992	29,164	92.47%	89.32%	69.40%	53.37%
Black or African American alone (NH)	449	1,920	10,827	18,517	2.40%	6.63%	22.10%	33.88%
Native American or Alaska Native alone (NH)	40	89	120	78	0.21%	0.31%	0.24%	0.14%
Asian alone (NH)	55	208	833	1,317	0.29%	0.72%	1.7%	2.41%
Native Hawaiian or Pacific Islander alone (NH)	—	5	25	54	—	0.02%	0.05%	0.10%
Other race alone (NH)	0	17	42	182	0.00%	0.06%	0.09%	0.33%
Mixed race or multiracial (NH)	—	201	671	1,990	—	0.69%	1.37%	3.64%
Hispanic or Latino (any race)	108	654	2,472	3,346	0.58%	2.26%	5.05%	6.12%
Total	18,705	28,977	48,982	54,648	100.00%	100.00%	100.00%	100.00%

=== 2020 census ===
As of the 2020 census, there were 54,648 people, 20,697 households, and 14,466 families residing in the city. The population density was 1,322.11 inhabitants per square mile (510.5/km^{2}). There were 22,328 housing units at an average density of 540.18 per square mile (208.6/km^{2}). The racial makeup of the city was 54.40% White, 34.02% African American, 0.29% Native American, 2.42% Asian, 0.10% Pacific Islander, 3.49% from some other races and 5.28% from two or more races. Hispanic or Latino people of any race were 6.12% of the population.

There were 20,697 households, of which 35.5% had children under the age of 18 living in them. Of all households, 46.1% were married-couple households, 16.2% were households with a male householder and no spouse or partner present, and 31.8% were households with a female householder and no spouse or partner present. About 25.8% of all households were made up of individuals and 9.4% had someone living alone who was 65 years of age or older.

Of the residents, 24.7% of residents were under the age of 18 and 14.3% of residents were 65 years of age or older. For every 100 females there were 89.2 males, and for every 100 females age 18 and over there were 84.8 males age 18 and over. The homeowner vacancy rate was 1.1% and the rental vacancy rate was 13.9%.

=== 2010 census ===
As of the 2010 census, there were 48,982 people, 17,969 households, and 13,125 families residing in the city. The population density was 1,187.47 inhabitants per square mile (458.5/km^{2}). There were 19,101 housing units at an average density of 463.07 per square mile (178.8/km^{2}). The racial makeup of the city was 71.02% White, 22.16% African American, 0.31% Native American, 1.72% Asian, 0.06% Pacific Islander, 3.02% from some other races and 1.71% from two or more races. Hispanic or Latino people of any race were 5.05% of the population.

=== 2000 census ===
As of the 2000 census, there were 28,977 people, 11,007 households, and 8,134 families residing in the city. The population density was 857.86 inhabitants per square mile (331.2/km^{2}). There were 11,462 housing units at an average density of 339.33 per square mile (131.0/km^{2}). The racial makeup of the city was 90.33% White, 6.65% African American, 0.32% Native American, 0.74% Asian, 0.03% Pacific Islander, 1.13% from some other races and 0.80% from two or more races. Hispanic or Latino people of any race were 2.26% of the population.

There were 11,007 households out of which 36.8% have children under the age of 18 living with them, 57.1% were married couples living together, 12.4% have a female householder with no husband present, and 26.1% were non-families. 21.3% of all households were made up of individuals and 5.7% have someone living alone who was 65 years of age or older. The average household size was 2.62 and the average family size was 3.04.

In the city the population was spread out with 27.2% under the age of 18, 9.0% from 18 to 24, 32.5% from 25 to 44, 22.6% from 45 to 64, and 8.8% who were 65 years of age or older. The median age was 33 years. For every 100 females there were 95.3 males. For every 100 females age 18 and over, there were 91.7 males.

The median income for a household in the city was $46,691, and the median income for a family was $52,333. Males had a median income of $36,671 versus $26,557 for females. The per capita income for the city was $20,759. About 5.3% of families and 6.7% of the population were below the poverty line, including 8.2% of those under age 18 and 6.8% of those age 65 or over.

== Arts and culture ==
=== Attractions ===
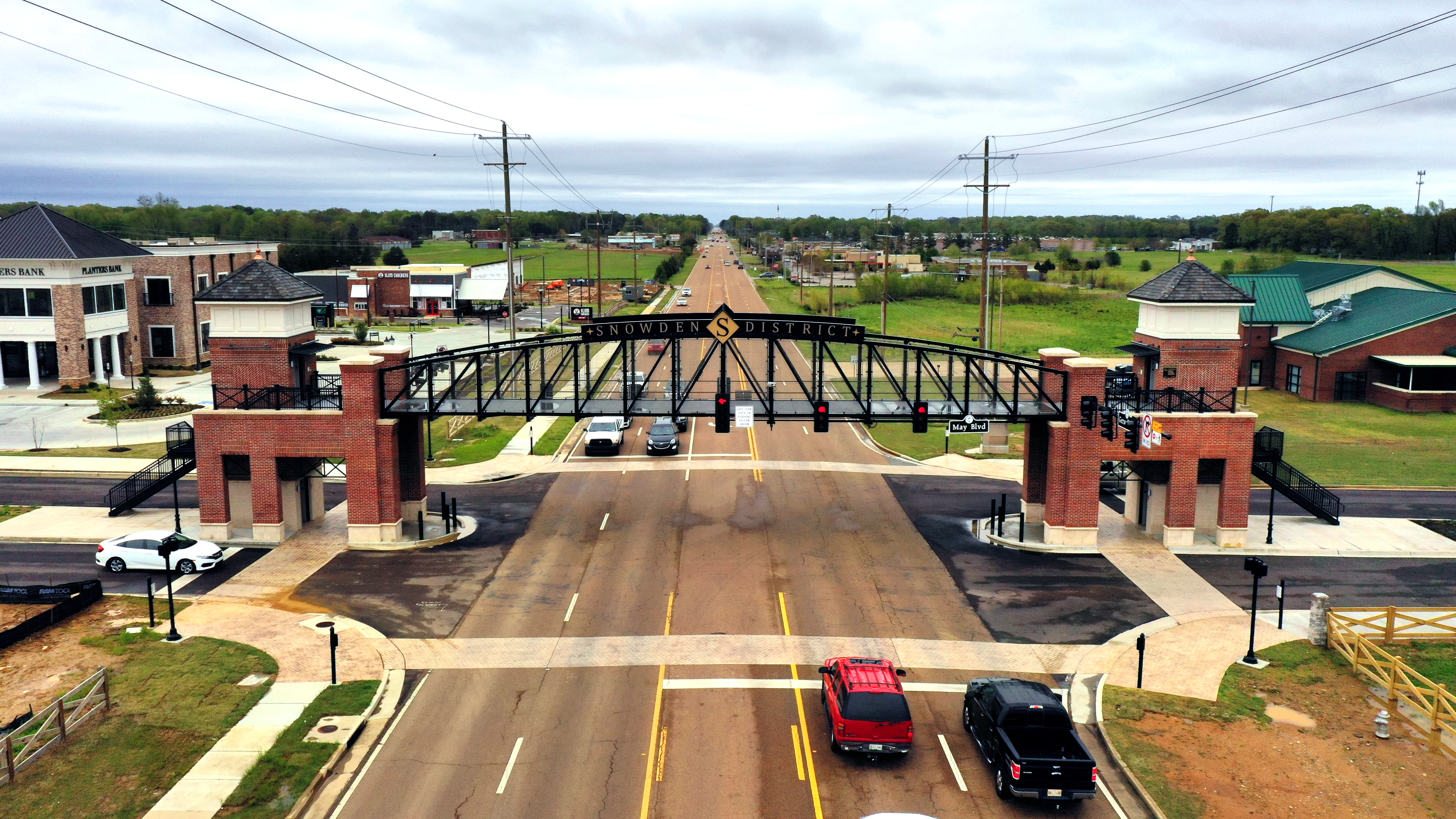
Snowden Grove Park pedestrian bridge over Getwell Road

- Landers Center
- Southaven Towne Center
- Tanger Outlets Southaven
- Snowden Grove Park
- BankPlus Amphitheater at Snowden Grove
- Southaven Arena

== Sports ==
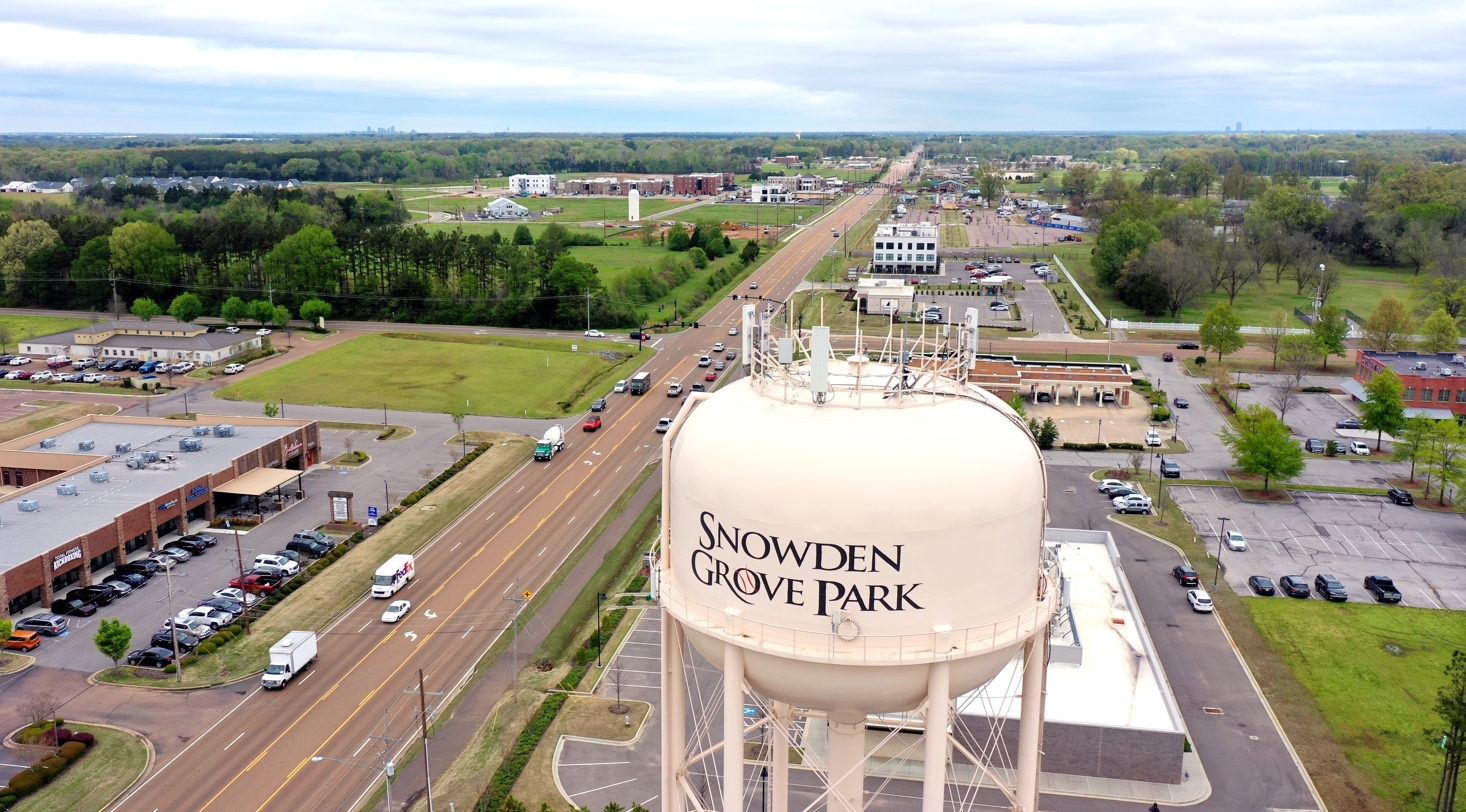
Snowden Grove Park Water Tower

Southaven's Snowden Grove Baseball Park hosts the annual Dizzy Dean Baseball World Series, where 5- to 19-year-old divisions are represented by teams from across the country.

The Memphis Grizzlies operate their NBA G League affiliate, the Memphis Hustle, at the Landers Center in Southaven.

From 2000 to 2018, Southaven hosted the Mississippi RiverKings at the Landers Center while they were members of the Central Hockey League and the Southern Professional Hockey League. The team relocated from Memphis prior to the 2000–01 season and was the main tenant of the Landers Center for most of their time in Southaven.

== Education ==
=== Colleges and universities ===
- University of Mississippi – Desoto
- Northwest Mississippi Community College

=== Public secondary schools ===
Southaven is served by the DeSoto County School District.

- Southaven High School
- DeSoto Central High School
- Southaven Intermediate School
- Southaven Middle School
- DeSoto Central Middle School

=== Public elementary schools ===
- Greenbrook Elementary School
- Southaven Elementary School
- Hope Sullivan Elementary School
- DeSoto Central Elementary School
- DeSoto Central Primary School
- Magnolia School (K-5)

=== Private schools ===
- Northpoint Christian School
- Church of God at Southaven Christian Academy
- Sacred Heart School (of the Roman Catholic Diocese of Jackson)

== Government ==
The mayor of Southaven is Darren Musselwhite, a Republican. He has served since June 28, 2013. The city council consists of seven members who are each elected from one of six wards, known as single-member districts, with one alderman being elected at large and representing the entire city.

The Southaven Police Department employs 139 full-time sworn officers and 31 civilian staff members. The department is organized into several divisions including patrol, traffic, criminal investigations, and more. Southaven Police Department collaborates with local organizations to ensure fair policing and enhance community quality of life.

The Southaven Fire Department operates four fire stations 24/7, ensuring quick response times for citizens. It provides Advanced Life Support and emergency transport. The department includes various divisions: Administration, Fire Prevention, Operations, Emergency Medical Services, and Training. It has 130 employees, five pumpers, two trucks, one squad, and four ambulances, along with reserve equipment.

== Media ==
=== AM radio ===
- WHAL 1240 AM (Urban oldies)

=== Newspapers ===
- DeSoto Times-Tribune
- DeSoto County News

== Infrastructure ==
=== Transportation ===
==== Rail ====
The Grenada Railroad operates 228 miles of track between Canton, MS and Memphis, TN. It has access to six major carriers and provides daily interchanges, a fleet of cars, fast turn-times, and 2,200 storage spots, ensuring timely and flexible rail service.

==== Mass Transit ====
While Southaven does not have its own separate public transit system, it is close to the larger Memphis Area Transit Authority (MATA)'s service area, which includes both the city of Memphis and its suburbs, not including Southaven. MATA provides fixed-route bus service, paratransit, and vintage trolleys.

==== Air ====
The nearest airport to Southaven, Mississippi is Memphis International Airport. It's located approximately 2 miles north of Southaven's center.

==== Highways ====
- I-55
- I-69
- US 51
- MS 302

== Notable people ==
- Keshunn Abram, former NFL wide receiver for New York Jets
- Kahlil Benson, NFL offensive lineman for Kansas City Chiefs, 2026 College Football Playoff national champion
- Cory Branan, singer and songwriter
- Greg Davis, politician and Mayor of Southaven
- Brandin Echols, NFL cornerback for Pittsburgh Steelers
- John Grisham, lawyer, writer
- Blaze Jordan, MLB first and third baseman for St. Louis Cardinals
- Kirby Lauryen, singer and songwriter
- Trey Lunsford, MLB catcher for San Francisco Giants
- Tazé Moore, NBA point guard for Portland Trail Blazers
- B. G. Perry, lawyer, judge and politician
- Austin Riley, MLB third baseman for Atlanta Braves
- Reagan Rust, former ice hockey player
- Christian Saulsberry, return specialist and wide receiver
- Kemmons Wilson, founder of Southaven
