= Tanger Outlets Southaven =

- Location: Southaven, Mississippi
- Coordinates: 34.9362°N 89.9915°W
- Address: 5205 Airways Blvd, Southaven, MS 38671
- Opened: November 2015
- Developer: Poag Shopping Centers / Tanger Factory Outlet Centers
- Architect: Dorsky and Yue International
- Num. of stores: 70
- Floor area: 330,000 square feet (31,000 m^{2})
- Website: Tanger Outlet Southaven Website

Tanger Outlets Southaven is an outlet mall in Southaven, Mississippi, just outside Memphis, Tennessee. The mall, located at the intersection of I-55/I-69 and Church Road, began construction in January 2015 and opened in November 2015. Tanger Outlets Southaven is the first outlet mall in the Memphis metro area.

== History ==
The original plan for the site, proposed in 2004, called for a retail destination to be named DeSoto Pointe, which would have been similar to Southaven Towne Center, a lifestyle center opened just north of the planned site in 2005. However, the plan fell through because of the economy.

In the late 2000s, the plan was revisited. In 2011, it was announced that Poag and McEwen, now Poag Shopping Centers, would be developing the project. This revised plan called for the outlet mall, which was not a part of the DeSoto Pointe plan, plus outparcels of hotels and restaurants. Former Southaven Mayor Greg Davis compared the proposed outlet mall to similar developments in Foley, Alabama and Destin, Florida. This revised development would be known as The Outlet Shops of the Mid-South.

On December 15, 2014, it was rumored that Tanger Outlets, a nationally known outlet center brand, would be joining in the development of this project. This was officially confirmed on January 7, 2015, when it was announced that the center would be known as Tanger Outlets Memphis. After public backlash from the mall being in Southaven but the name reflecting a location in Memphis, the official name was changed to Tanger Outlets Southaven. Advertisements will still refer to Memphis due to the mall's close proximity to the city limits.

The center officially broke ground on March 13, 2015 at 12pm. While originally planned to open in Fall of 2013, the mall opened on November 20, 2015 at 9am.
