= BankPlus Amphitheater =

Concert venue in Mississippi, US

BankPlus Amphitheater at Snowden Grove
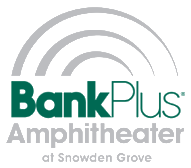
- Interactive map of BankPlus Amphitheater at Snowden Grove
- Location: 6285 Snowden Lane, Southaven, Mississippi 38672
- Coordinates: 34°57′04″N 89°56′2″W
- Owner: City of Southaven
- Type: Amphitheater
- Capacity: 11,000

Construction
- Opened: 2006

Website
- www.bankplusamphitheater.com

BankPlus Amphitheater at Snowden Grove, formerly Snowden Grove Amphitheater, is a concert venue located at Snowden Grove Park in Southaven, Mississippi, a suburb of Memphis, Tennessee. Opened in 2006, the amphitheater features 9,800 fixed seats, with a lawn area able to accommodate 850 additional spectators.

== Name change ==
In late 2014, BankPlus purchased the naming rights for Snowden Grove Amphitheater. The amphitheater's name changed to the BankPlus Amphitheater at Snowden Grove, effective January 1, 2015.

== Featured acts ==
- Dave Matthews Band
- Nickelback
- Kenny Chesney
- Jason Aldean
- ZZ Top
- Velvet Revolver
- Trace Adkins
- Poison
- Lynyrd Skynyrd
- Blues Traveler
- Seether
- Willie Nelson
- Eric Church
- Brantley Gilbert
- Dierks Bentley
- Sugarland
- blink-182
- Miranda Lambert
- Lady Antebellum
- Florida Georgia Line
- Train
- Goo Goo Dolls
- Journey
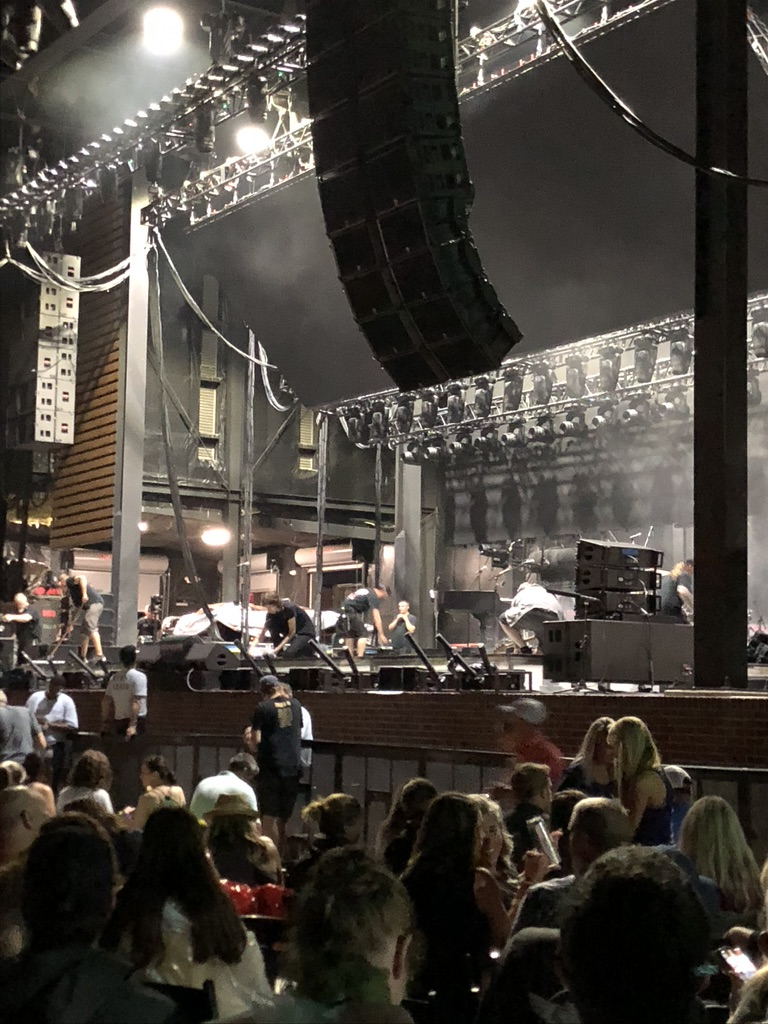
  Train and Goo Goo Dolls Changeover 6/23/19
- Weezer
- Hozier
- Jelly Roll
- Big Time Rush
- Travis Tritt
- Smashing Pumpkins
- Lainey Wilson
- The Black Crowes
- 3 Doors Down

== See also ==
- List of contemporary amphitheatres
