= Snowden Grove Park =

Park in Southaven, Mississippi, US

- Interactive map of Snowden Grove Park
- Location: 6450 Getwell Road, Southaven, Mississippi
- Coordinates: 34°57′03″N 89°55′52″W
- Area: 200 acres (80.94 ha)
- Created: 1999

Snowden Grove Park is a mixed-use park located in Southaven, Mississippi, a suburb of Memphis, Tennessee.

Opened in 1999, the 200 acres (81 ha) park was built on land donated by the Snowden family.

== Park amenities ==
The former Snowden home is located on the property and is used for special events.

The Snowden Grove Park baseball facility features 17 baseball-only playing fields, making one of the largest youth baseball complex in the United States. In addition, the Southaven Field of Dreams, a mini complex for mentally challenged and handicapped children and adults, is located at the park.

Snowden Grove also features the BankPlus Sports Center, a full indoor sports complex which includes two putt-putt courses, soccer fields, and batting cages.

The BankPlus Amphitheater at Snowden Grove is a concert venue opened in 2006 able to accommodate 14,000 people. Located on the far west side of the park along Getwell Road, it has hosted performances by Willie Nelson, Miranda Lambert, Dave Matthews Band, ZZ Top, Merle Haggard, and others.

== Other events ==
Each year in April, Snowden Grove Park plays host to Southaven's three-day Springfest celebration, which features carnival rides, live entertainment, and a barbecue contest. Springfest marks the anniversary of the city's incorporation, which took place on April 15, 1980.
