= Southaven Towne Center =

Coordinates: 34.955823°N 89.993793°W

- Location: Southaven, Mississippi, U.S.
- Opened: October 2005
- Developer: CBL & Associates
- Manager: CBL & Associates
- Owner: CBL
- Num. of stores: 45
- Num. of anchor tenants: 2
- Floor area: 520,828 sq ft (48,386.5 m^{2})
- Floors: 1 (2 in Dillard's)
- Website: www.southaventownecenter.com

Southaven Towne Center is an open-air regional lifestyle center located in Southaven, Mississippi. The shopping center is owned and managed by CBL & Associates, who developed the property and opened it in October 2005. It was reported that upon opening, the Southaven Towne Center was expected to contribute 1000 jobs to the local economy. This facility marks a first for CBL & Associates, it is their first foray into the lifestyle center property type. Southaven Towne Center brought department stores to Southaven for the first time.

== Anchors ==
- JCPenney
- Dillard's

== Other Stores ==
- Sportsman's Warehouse
- Bed Bath & Beyond
- Books-A-Million

== Former Stores ==
- Linens 'n Things (now Bed Bath & Beyond)
- Circuit City (later hhgregg)
- hhgregg (closed 2017)
- Gordmans (closed 2020)

== See also ==
- List of shopping malls in Mississippi
