= MetroCenter (Arlington, Texas) =

Entertainment venue and church

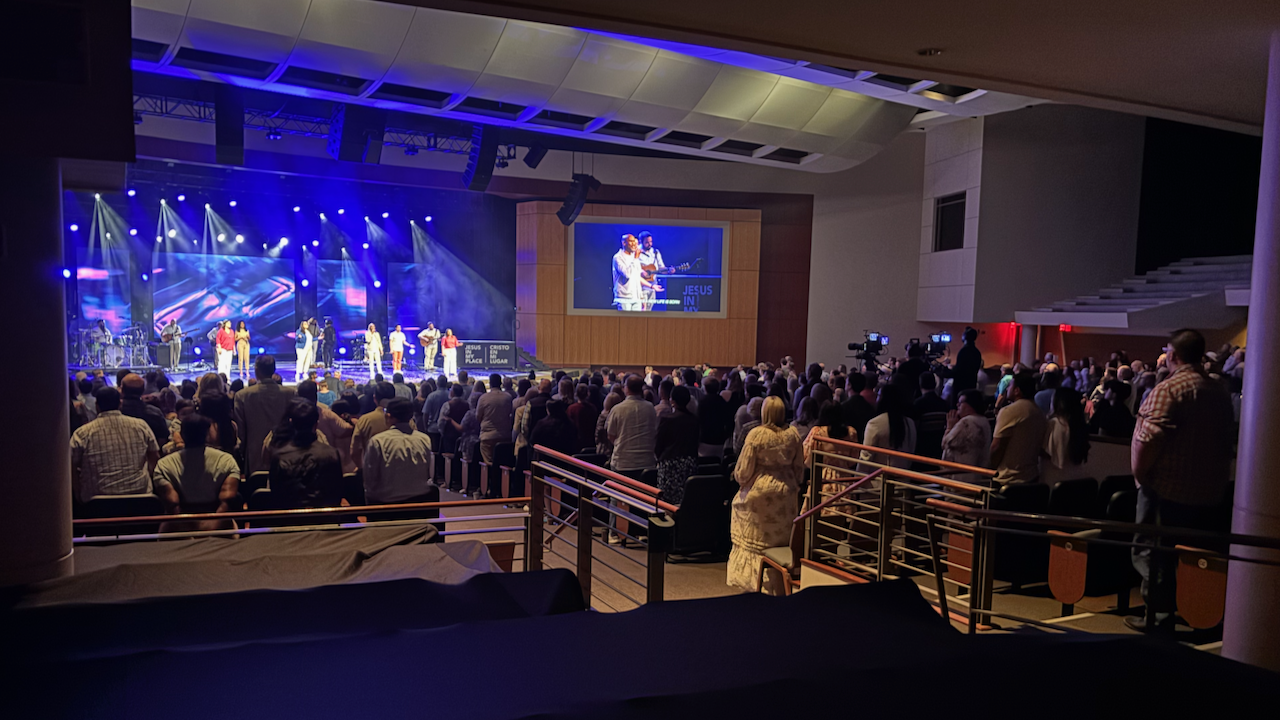
- MetroCenter during a church service in 2024.
- Address: 1323 W. Pioneer Parkway (Spur 303); Arlington, TX; United States
- Coordinates: 32.7096°N 97.130127°W
- Capacity: 1,700
- Opened: January 16, 2005

The MetroCenter at 1323 W. Pioneer Parkway (Spur 303) in Arlington, Texas, opened in 2005. The 98,000 square-foot venue has hosted concerts, theatrical productions, conferences and other community events, and is also used by Fielder Church as a place of worship. It was built by the church for $17 million, (Note: Some sources claim $20 million.) and seats 1,700. As of 2024, the MetroCenter continues to host the annual MLK Youth Musical Extravaganza honoring Martin Luther King Jr.

== History ==
The MetroCenter is an extension of Fielder Church and was conceived by former Senior Pastor Dr. Gary Smith and former Executive Pastor Mike Wierick. Plans were made as late as 2002, and costs were estimated to be around $21 million. Half of the money was raised by December 2002.

It was designed by Beck Group Architecture and constructed by Manhattan Construction Company. Acoustic Dimensions designed the high end audio and video system and Ford Audio and Video handled the installation. Phase two of its construction was expected to add an addition 1,450 seats, but plans were scrapped.

The MetroCenter was officially deemed ready for occupancy on January 6, 2005, with its first service being held on January 16. It was built and is advertised as a multi-purpose facility, the MetroCenter housed symphony, stage, musicals, conferences and rock concerts.

In January 2009, the MetroCenter was ranked #2 Top Performing Arts Venues in Tarrant County by seating capacity by the Fort Worth Business Press.

In 2010, Symphony Arlington announced that it would be moving to a new facility after being there since May 12, 2005, stating that the MetroCenter had been a problematic venue for classical musicians and audiences.

== See also ==
- List of concert halls
