= Market Street Flowood =

Shopping mall in Flowood, Mississippi, United States

Coordinates: 32.337°N 90.067°W

Market Street Flowood is an outdoor shopping mall in Flowood, Mississippi. It is managed and leased by Trademark Property Company. It has two anchor tenants. This shopping mall contains many upscale dining restaurants. It is across the street from nearby outdoor mall Dogwood Festival Market. It is on the other corner of Lakeland Drive (MS 25) and East Metro Parkway.
