= Gayfers =

Department store chain of the southern United States

Gayfer's
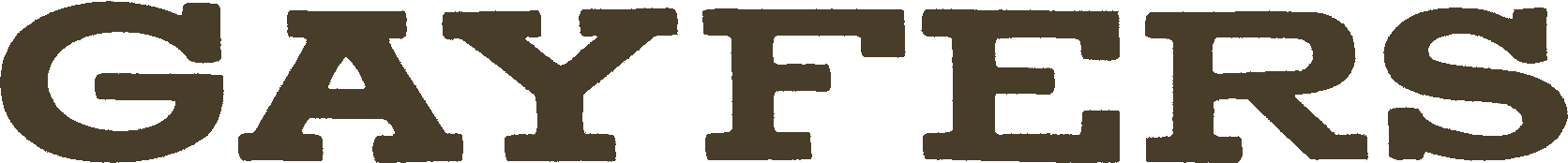
- Company type: Department store
- Industry: Retail
- Founded: 1879; 147 years ago
- Defunct: 1998; 28 years ago
- Fate: Acquired by Dillard's, Inc
- Headquarters: Mobile, Alabama
- Products: Clothing, footwear, bedding, furniture, jewelry, beauty products, and housewares.
- Parent: Formerly Mercantile Stores Company, Inc.(1950-1998)
- Website: None

Gayfer's was a regional department store chain in the southern United States. Based in Mobile, Alabama, the chain of stores operated from 1879 until 1998 when it was taken over by Dillard's.

== History ==
C.J. Gayfer migrated to Mobile, Alabama, from Southwold, England, sometime after the Civil War. He opened a retail department store, Gayfer's, in downtown Mobile in 1879. At the time of his death in 1915, Gayfer's employed 150 people and averaged over $500,000 (~$11.2 million in 2024) in annual sales. Gayfer became well known for his philanthropy and was one of the earliest proponents of employee health care benefits.

Classic logo used for many years

During the 1950s, the Mercantile Stores chain acquired Gayfer's, which then worked aggressively on the expansion of the chain. The first branch store was opened at Town & Country Plaza in Pensacola, Florida, in 1956. This successful move was followed four years later with the opening of the Springdale Plaza store in Mobile, Alabama, becoming the company's flagship store. The Downtown Mobile store closed in 1985.

Gayfer's expanded into the Western Gulf Coast in 1963, opening a store at Edgewater Plaza Shopping City (later Edgewater Mall) in Biloxi, Mississippi. This store was expanded in 1974 and again in 1987; it was severely damaged by Hurricane Katrina in 2005 (by this time it was Dillard's) and had to be rebuilt. In 1969 a store was opened in Tuscaloosa, Alabama.

In 1970, the apostrophe in the company name was dropped. This was clearly a banner year for the company, as it opened stores in Montgomery, Alabama (through the purchase of Montgomery-based Montgomery Fair); Jackson Mall in Jackson, Mississippi, and started construction of a second store in Pensacola, Florida, at Cordova Mall.

For the next twenty years, new stores were opened or remodeled, and by 1981 there were 18 stores bearing the Gayfers name. In 1989, the Gayfers flagship store anchoring Springdale Plaza and Mall in Mobile expanded to 285,000 square feet (26,500 m^{2}). In February 1992, parent Mercantile acquired Maison Blanche by converting their Orlando (Altamonte, Florida, Fashion Square), Daytona Beach (Volusia), and Jacksonville (Roosevelt, Regency, Orange Park, Avenues) stores under the Gayfers banner. This led to their becoming one the largest department store chains in the Southern United States as well as the largest stretching from Miami to Atlanta to Houston.

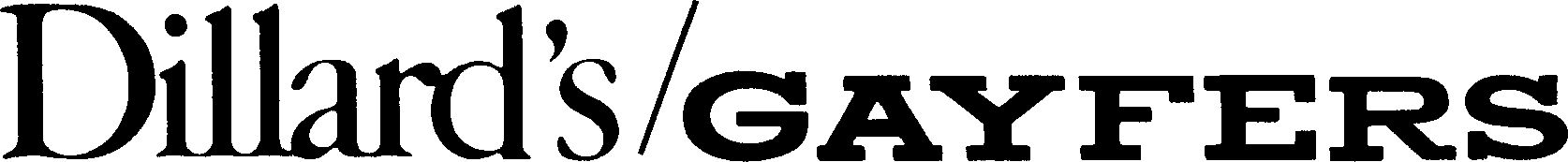
Dillard's-Gayfer's transition logo

In 1998, Mercantile Stores was purchased by Dillard's, Inc., and the stores that were not closed or sold to other retailers were converted to Dillard's, which ceased expanding through acquisitions after this happened.
