= Dogwood Festival Market =

Outdoor shopping mall

Coordinates: 32.3391°N 90.0612°W

Dogwood Festival Market is an outdoor shopping mall located on Mississippi Highway 25 in Flowood, Mississippi, United States. It opened in 2002 and has 57 stores and restaurants. Its total size is 187,000 square feet. It is owned and managed by Inland National Real Estate Services LLC. It has one anchor store, Belk, which originally opened as McRae's. McRae's was sold and converted to Belk in 2006. It is across the street from Market Street Flowood, another outdoor shopping mall in Flowood.

== Restaurants ==
- Chick-fil-A
- Dickey’s Barbecue Pit
- El Sombrero Mexican Restaurant
- Logan’s Roadhouse
- McAlister’s Deli
- Jersey Mike's Subs
- The Yard Milkshake Bar
- Yakiniku Korean & Japanese BBQ
- Poke' Stop

== Anchor tenants ==
- Belk (originally McRae's)
