= Mercantile Stores Company, Inc. =

Coordinates: 39.32329°N 84.49216°W

Mercantile Stores Company Inc.
- Company type: department stores
- Industry: Retail
- Founded: 1914
- Defunct: 1998
- Fate: bought by Dillard's, Inc.
- Headquarters: 9450 Seward Road; Fairfield, Ohio 45014 (Cincinnati, Ohio)
- Products: Clothing, footwear, bedding, furniture, jewelry, beauty products, and housewares.
- Website: Was: /http://www.mercstores.com/

Mercantile Stores Company Inc. until 1998, was a traditional department store retailer operating 102 fashion apparel stores and 16 home fashion stores in 17 states. The stores were operated under 13 different nameplates and varied in size, with the average store approximating 170,000 sq ft (16,000 m^{2}). Store names included Bacon's, Castner Knott, de Lendrecie's, Gayfers, The Glass Block, Hennessy's, J. B. White (also known as White's), The Jones Store Company, Joslins, Lion Store, McAlpin's, and Root's.

Each store offered a wide selection of merchandise with special emphasis placed on fashion apparel, accessories and fashion home furnishings. This was aimed at middle and upper-middle income consumers. In addition to its department store operations the company maintained a partnership position in five operating shopping center ventures. Each of these centers had a retail outlet of the company.

The store chain was formed in 1914 out of the bankruptcy of H.B. Claflin & Company. Its stores were separated into two store chains, Associated Dry Goods - with brands such as Lord & Taylor and Hengerer's - and Mercantile Stores Company. In May 1998 Mercantile Stores was acquired by Dillard's of Little Rock, Arkansas, for $2.9 billion (~$5.19 billion in 2024). Later that year, Dillard's announced plans to sell off 26 of the newly acquired locations where there already were Dillard's stores to The May Department Stores Company and Proffitt's Inc.
