= Artspace =

Artspace may refer to:

- Artspace (website), an online marketplace based in New York City
- Artspace, New Haven, an art gallery in downtown New Haven, Connecticut
- Artspace Mackay, Mackay, Queensland, Australia
- Artspace NZ, a visual arts center in Auckland, New Zealand
- Artspace Projects, an NFP group that creates spaces for artists, based in Minneapolis, Minnesota
  - Artspace Read's, one of its live/work spaces for artists, in Bridgeport, Connecticut
- Artspace Visual Arts Centre, Sydney, Australia, known simply as Artspace
- Spike Island Artspace, formerly Artspace Bristol, UK

== See also ==
- Arts centre
