= List of department stores converted to Macy's =

This is a list of department stores converted to Macy's and sister brand Bloomingdale's by way of mergers and acquisitions. Macy's became a national brand through these conversions, and replaced many regional department stores with local heritage throughout the United States. The 2005 acquisition of The May Department Stores Company by Macy's parent Federated Department Stores (present-day Macy's, Inc.) was the largest of these transactions, and resulted in 11 regional brands becoming defunct in 2006. The table below includes department stores that were directly converted to Macy's and brands subjected to previous conversions that were ultimately converted to Macy's.

Timeline of former department stores merging into Macy's

List of department stores converted to Macy's
Department store	Year founded	Year converted	Converted to	Ref
Abraham & Straus	1865	1995	Macy's	
Bamberger's	1893	1986	Macy's	
The Bon Marché	1890	2005	Macy's	
The Broadway	1896	1996	Macy's	
Bullock's	1907	1995	Macy's	
Burdines	1896	2005	Macy's	
Capwell's	1889	1980	Emporium–Capwell	
Castner Knott	1898	2001	Hecht's	
C.C. Anderson's Golden Rule		1937	The Bon Marché	
Davison's	1891	1985	Macy's	
Dayton's	1902	2001	Marshall Field's	
The Emporium	1896	1980	Emporium–Capwell	
Emporium–Capwell	1980	1996	Macy's	
Famous-Barr	1911	2005	Macy's	
The Famous Clothing Store	1874	1911	Famous-Barr	
Filene's	1881	2006	Bloomingdale's	
Filene's	1881	2006	Macy's	
Foley's	1900	2006	Macy's	
Gertz	1918	1982	Stern's	
Goldsmith's	1870	2005	Macy's	
Goldwater's	1860	1989		
G. Fox & Co.	1847	1993	Filene's	
Hale Bros.	1876	1996	Macy's	
Hamburger's	1881	1923	May Company California	
Hecht's	1857	2006	Bloomingdale's	
Hecht's	1857	2006	Macy's	
Herpolsheimer's	1865	1990	Macy's	
Horne's	1849	1994	Lazarus	
Hudson's	1881	2001	Marshall Field's	
I. Magnin	1876	1994	Bullock's	
I. Magnin	1876	1994	Macy's	
The Jones Store	1887	2006	Macy's	
Jordan Marsh	1841	1996	Macy's	
J. W. Robinson's	1883	1993	Robinsons-May	
Kaufmann's	1871	2006	Macy's	
Lasalle & Koch	1865	1981	Macy's	
Lazarus	1851	2005	Macy's	
Liberty House	1849	2001	Macy's	
Lipman's	1850	1979	Marshall Field's	
L. S. Ayres	1872	2006	Macy's	
Maas Brothers	1886	1991	Burdines	
Marshall Field's	1852	2006	Bloomingdale's	
Marshall Field's	1852	2006	Macy's	
May Company California	1881	1993	Robinsons-May	
May Company Ohio	1898	1993	Kaufmann's	
May-Daniels & Fisher	1957	1993	Foley's	
Meier & Frank	1857	2006	Macy's	
Miller & Rhoads	1885	1990	Hecht's	
O'Connor, Moffat & Co.	1866	1947	Macy's	
O'Neil's	1877	1989	May Company Ohio	
Quackenbush			Stern's	
Read's	1857	1993	Macy's	
Rich's	1867	2005	Bloomingdale's	
Rich's	1867	2005	Macy's	
Rike Kumler Co.	1853	1986	Lazarus	
Robinsons-May	1993	2006	Bloomingdale's	
Robinsons-May	1993	2006	Macy's	
Sanger-Harris	1961	1987	Foley's	
Shillito's	1830	1986	Lazarus	
Sibley's	1868	1990	Kaufmann's	
Steiger's	1896	1995	Macy's	
Stern's	1867	2001	Bloomingdale's	
Stern's	1867	2001	Macy's	
Strawbridge's	1868	2006	Macy's	
Strouss	1875	1986	Kaufmann's	
Thalhimers	1842	1992	Hecht's	
Wanamaker's	1861	1995	Hecht's	
Weinstock's	1874	1996	Macy's	
William H. Block Co.	1874	1987	Lazarus	
ZCMI	1868	2001	Meier & Frank	

== See also ==
- List of defunct department stores of the United States
- List of department stores of the United States
