= Gallatin Crossing =

- Location: Bozeman, Montana, United States
- Coordinates: 45.67386°N 111.07714°W
- Opened: 1980
- Num. of stores: 65
- Num. of anchor tenants: 4
- Floor area: 315,000 square feet (29,300 m^{2})
- Floors: 1
- Website: www.gallatincrossing.com

Gallatin Crossing is a shopping mall located in Bozeman, Montana. Opened in 1980 as Main Mall, it was renamed Gallatin Valley Mall in 1999 and then Gallatin Crossing in June 2025. Its anchors are Macy's (formerly The Bon Marché), Jo-Ann Fabrics, and Barnes & Noble. It also had a Rocky Mountain Bank and a Regal Cinemas. In 2013, a Petco was built. On June 4, 2020, it was announced that JCPenney would be closing as part of a plan to close 154 stores nationwide. The store closed in October 2020.
