= Sunrise Mall (New York) =

Coordinates: 40.6829°N 73.434591°W

Sunrise Mall (Long Island)
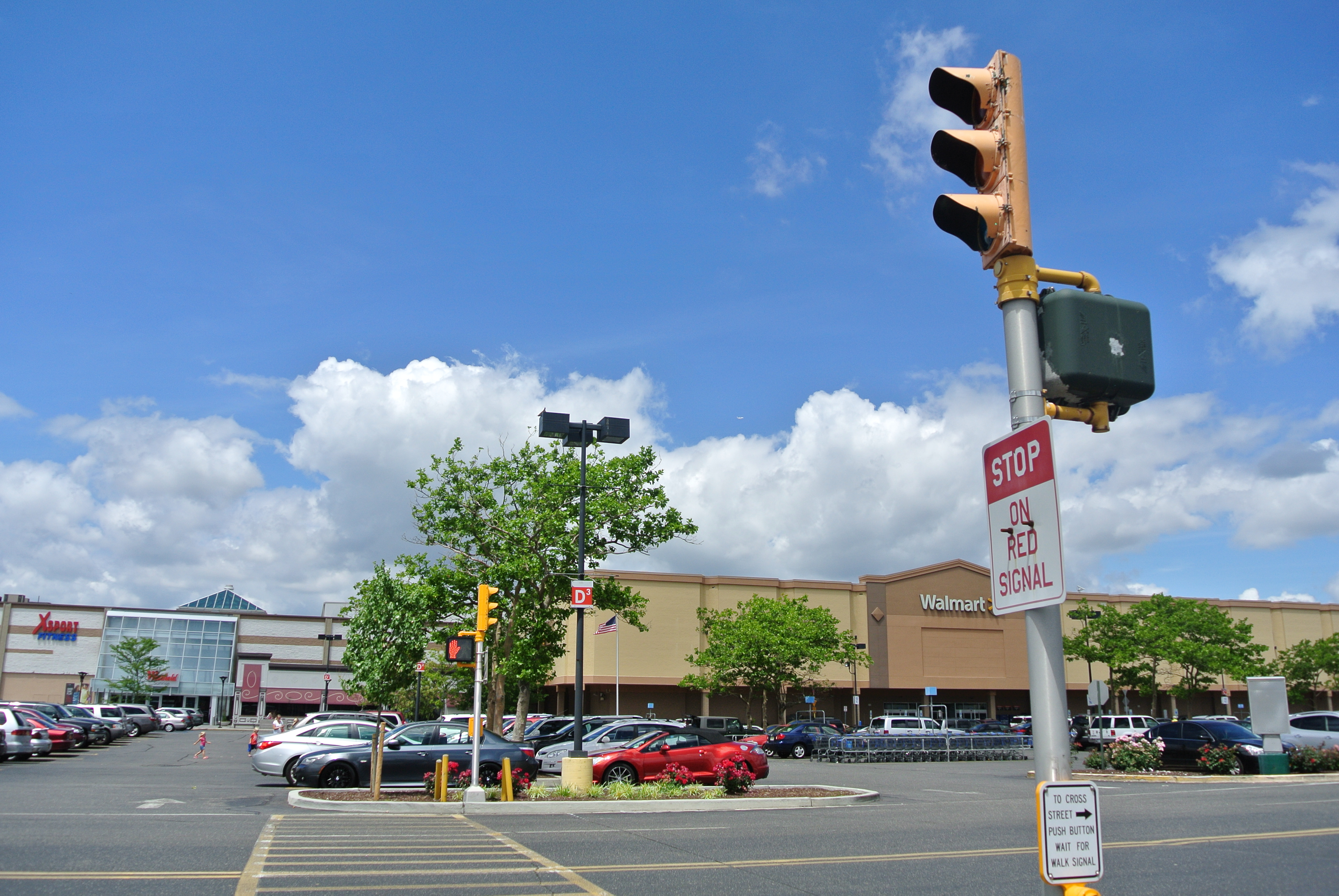
- An intersection within the Sunrise Mall, East Massapequa.
- Location: East Massapequa, New York, U.S.
- Opened: August 30, 1973 (53 years ago)
- Closed: 2023
- Previous names: Sunrise Mall (1973-2005); Westfield Sunrise (2005-2019)
- Developer: Muss-Tankoos Corporation
- Manager: Urban Edge Properties
- Owner: Urban Edge Properties
- Architect: Lathrop Douglass
- Num. of stores: 0 (after closing)
- Num. of anchor tenants: 0 (after closing)
- Floor area: 1,244,386 sq ft (115,607 m^{2})
- Floors: 2
- Parking: 7,000
- Website: sunrisemallny.com

Sunrise Mall was a shopping mall located in East Massapequa, New York. The mall opened on August 30, 1973, as the first two-level shopping mall on Long Island. The interior closed in 2023 and the final anchor store closed on April 4, 2026.

== History ==
Built by the Muss-Tankoos Corporation, the 1.3-million-square-foot mall cost $45 million and featured 140 individual shops, plus four department stores, as the first two-floor mall on Long Island. Opened on August 30, 1973, Sunrise Mall was originally anchored by JCPenney, Gertz, Macy's, and E. J. Korvette. Other stores included F. W. Woolworth, Fanny Farmer, Herman's, Thom McAn, Lerner Shops, Nathan's, and Sam Goody. A five-screen movie theater operated by United Artists opened at the mall in 1976. Two more screens were added in 1979.

It was remodeled in 1991 to modernize the space and add a glass elevator and skylights. A koi pond was installed in the mall in 1996, converting a 4,000-gallon duck pond. The theater closed at the end of its lease in 1999 and was replaced by multiple stores. The mall was acquired by the Westfield Group in 2005 for $143 million and renamed Westfield Sunrise. In June 2007, a man was arrested after driving his car through the mall and causing $60,000 worth of damage.

Walmart closed its store in the mall on March 6, 2015 after 12 years and was replaced by Dick's Sporting Goods. On March 17, 2017, it was announced that JCPenney would be closing their store in the mall and liquidation sales were expected to begin on April 17, 2017. However, on April 13, it announced that, due to more shoppers coming to the store, liquidation sales would begin on May 22, 2017 instead of April 17, 2017. The store ultimately closed on July 31, 2017.

In October 2018, SeaQuest announced its plan to open an interactive aquarium in the Sunrise Mall. However, the company later pulled out in May 2019, citing the lengthy approval process and ongoing resistance from activists, including actor Alec Baldwin.

On March 19, 2020, the mall closed due to the ongoing COVID-19 pandemic. It remained closed until July 15. On August 4, 2020, it was announced that the mall would be going back to its original name, Sunrise Mall. On January 4, 2021, Sunrise Mall was purchased by Urban Edge Properties from Unibail-Rodamco-Westfield for $29.7 million.

In October 2021, Sears closed. In February 2022, Urban Edge Properties announced they would not renew leases for its remaining 50 interior tenants and were considering ways to redevelop the space. By September, the mall's 50 koi had been relocated to local schools and the Long Island Aquarium.

The Macy's anchor store closed on March 23, 2025, along with 66 other stores nationwide.

Dick's Sporting Goods closed on April 4, 2026, leaving the mall completely vacant. Redevelopment talks for the site continue.

== Transportation ==
Nassau Inter-County Express (NICE) buses that serve the mall are the n71 Farmingdale State College-Amityville via Hempstead Turnpike).

As of September 1, 2024, the n19 and n80 no longer serve the mall, with the n19 terminating at Hicksville Road and the n80 terminating near the mall at Unqua Road and Sunrise Highway.

As of May 25, 2025, the n54 and n55 no longer serve the mall as they now bypass it, leaving the n71 as the only remaining route to serve the mall.

Beginning September 7, 2025, the n71 will no longer serve the mall as it will bypass it. As a result, Sunrise Mall will no longer have any bus routes directly serving it.

== Gallery ==
Sunrise Mall
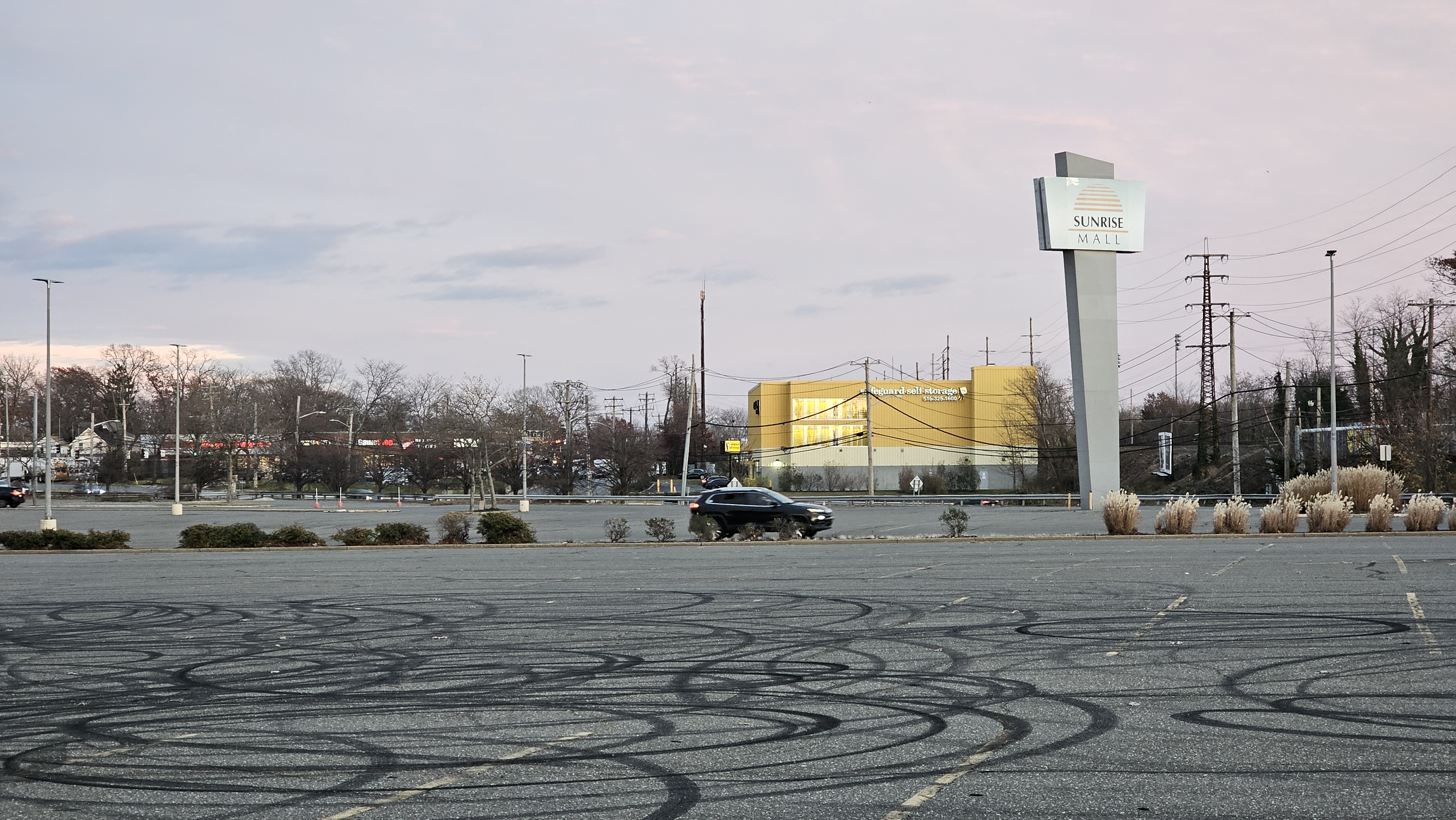
Parking lot nearby the mall's sign.

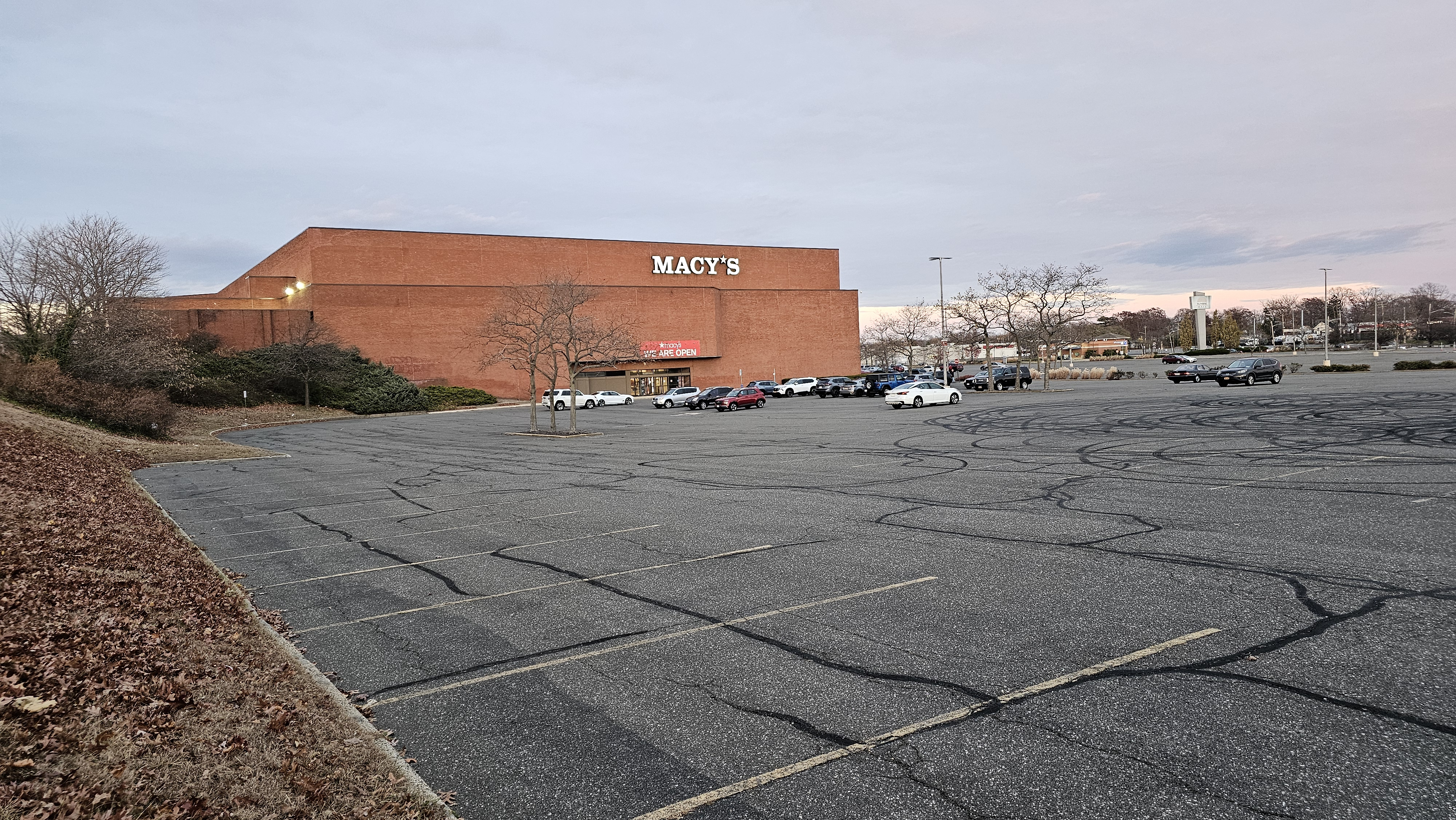
The parking lot of Macy's.

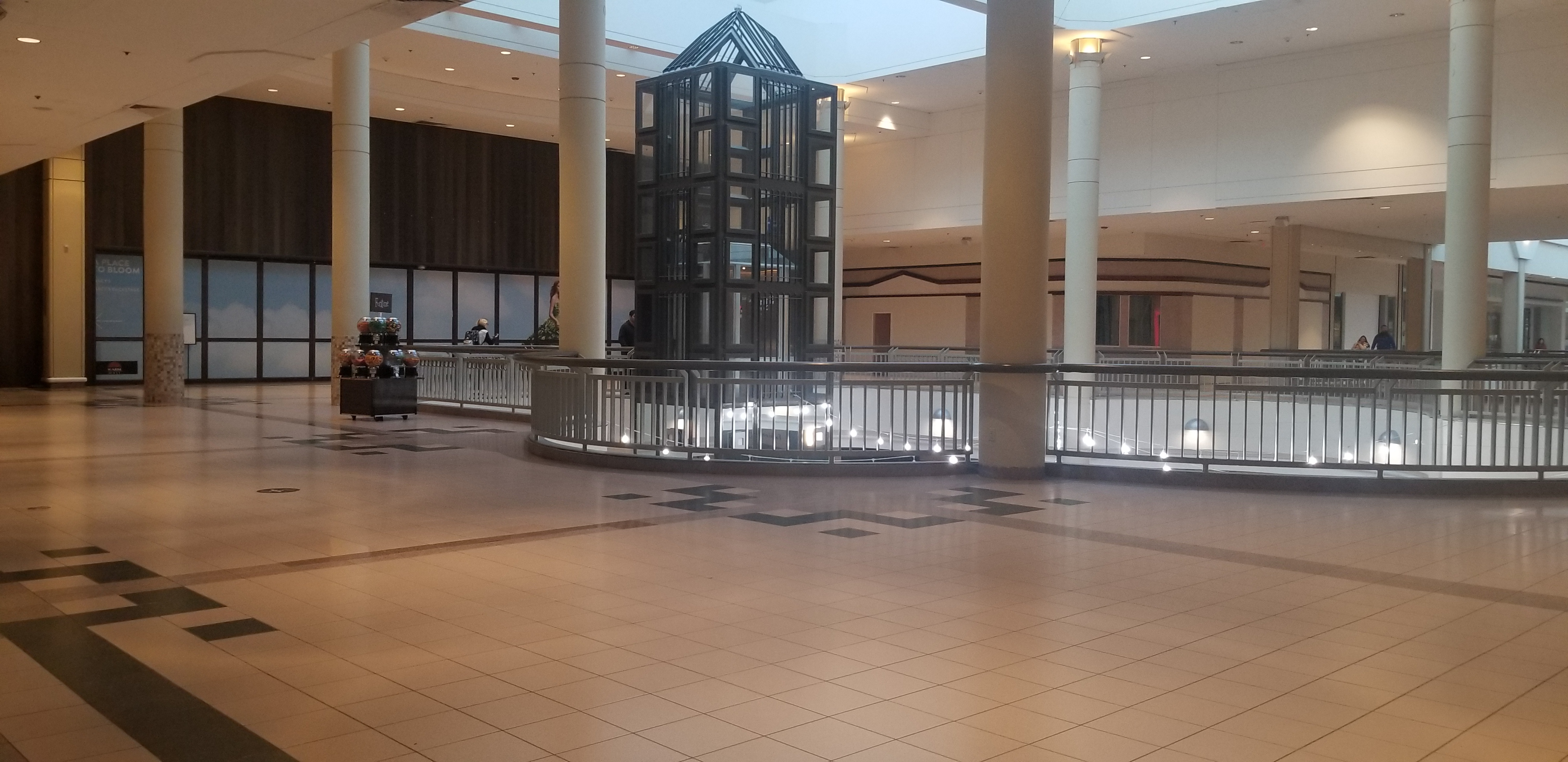
Mall interior, March 2022.

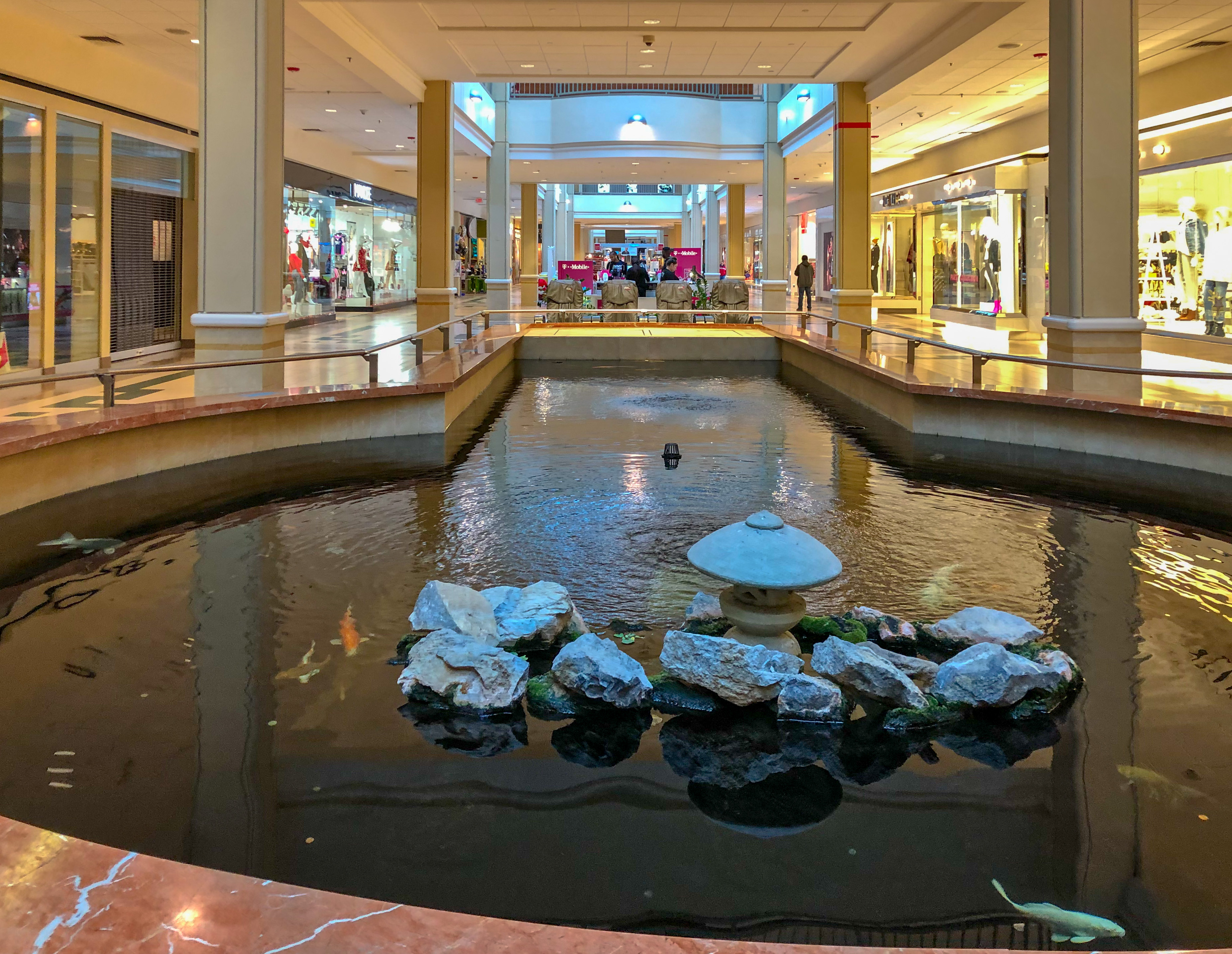
The koi pond, located at the west of the mall, in 2019.

== See also ==
- Roosevelt Field
- Retail apocalypse
- Dead mall
- Broadway Commons
