= Trumbull Mall =

- Sign at the entrance (2023)
- Location: Trumbull, Connecticut
- Coordinates: 41°13′45″N 73°13′34″W
- Address: 5065 Main Street, Trumbull, CT 06611 United States
- Opened: 1964
- Previous names: Trumbull Shopping Park, Westfield Shoppingtown Trumbull, and Westfield Trumbull
- Developer: Frouge Corporation
- Manager: Centennial Real Estate
- Owner: Namdar Realty Group and Mason Asset Management
- Num. of stores: 169
- Num. of anchor tenants: 4 (3 open, 1 vacant)
- Floor area: 1,130,690 square feet (105,045 m^{2})
- Floors: 2 (3 in Macy's)
- Parking: 4,436 spaces
- Public transit: Greater Bridgeport Transit: 3, 4, 6, 8
- Website: trumbullmall.com

Trumbull Mall is a shopping mall located in Trumbull, Connecticut. It was the first enclosed shopping mall in Connecticut upon opening in 1964. The mall was developed by the Frogue Corporation, and was the first U.S. acquisition by Australian mall operator Westfield Group in 1977. Ownership and management were transferred to the Westfield Corporation in 2014, and to Unibail-Rodamco-Westfield in 2018. It has 1,130,690 square feet (105,045 m^{2}) of gross area. In early 2023, the mall was sold to Namdar Realty Group and Mason Asset Management. In June 2025, Namdar and Mason defaulted on a $152.3 million loan and sold management of the mall to Centennial Real Estate. The mall is anchored by Macy's, JCPenney, and Target.

== History ==
Trumbull Mall was originally known as the Trumbull Shopping Park and was built in 1964 by the Frouge Corporation, with a branch of the E. J. Korvette discount department store and D.M. Read as its two original anchor stores, as well as a Waldbaum's and Woolworth's. In 1977, it was purchased by The Westfield Group and became the first US mall purchased by the Australian mall operator. The first f.y.e. store opened at the mall in 1993.

Read's was converted into Jordan Marsh, another nameplate owned by parent company Allied Stores, in 1987. The merger of Allied and Federated Department Stores resulted in Jordan Marsh being converted into Abraham & Straus in April 1992, and later Abraham & Straus being converted into Macy’s in April 1995. Trumbull Shopping Park was renamed Westfield Shoppingtown Trumbull in 1998.

The mall was renamed Westfield Trumbull with the company-wide discontinuation of the "Westfield Shoppingtown" naming convention in May 2005, citing that "the name served its purpose" and that "Shoppingtown is part of [their] heritage, but Westfield is the brand." With the acquisition of The May Company by Federated in July 2005, it was announced that the Federated-owned Macy's would vacate its previous location in the former Read's building and reopen in the outgoing May-owned Filene's building; the conversion was completed in 2006. The vacant Read's anchor spot was demolished in 2007; in its place, a two-floor Target store was constructed and opened in October 2008.

In September 2008, it was announced that Steve & Barry's would be closing as part of plan to close 103 stores nationwide. The store closed September 24, 2008.

On January 16, 2009, it was announced that Circuit City would also be closing as part of plan to close all 567 stores nationwide after failing to find a buyer.

On November 29, 2010, Westfield Trumbull unveiled results of a major $35M renovation that including several new stores, an LA Fitness in the old Circuit City space, remodeled mall entrances, and a new Dining Terrace food court to replace the old food court and the previous Steve & Barry's space.

On November 8, 2013, UNIQLO opened near Lord & Taylor. It has since been closed in 2017 and is now an Ulta Beauty, which opened in 2018.

On August 5, 2014, The Cheesecake Factory opened.

On October 11, 2014, an Apple Store opened near Lord & Taylor.

On August 25, 2016, Ruby Tuesday permanently closed their Trumbull location as part of a plan to close 95 restaurants nationwide.

In October 2017, a Wahlburgers restaurant opened in the former Ruby Tuesday space. It eventually closed in 2020 due to the COVID-19 pandemic and has been replaced with a Guacamole’s Mexican Cuisine restaurant, which opened in 2022.

On July 2, 2019, SeaQuest opened. There was also plans for a Goldfish Swim School to open at the mall, but plans were eventually scrapped.

On August 4, 2020, it was announced that all Lord & Taylor would close, as a result of the economic impact of the COVID-19 pandemic. Early plans envision the 99,534-square-foot (9,247-square-meter) store reconstructed into a modern space known as York Factory, a co-working sub-brand offering soft amenities such as a program delivering lunch straight to your office, bike rentals, a physical and mental wellness studio, salon services, and weekly events.

On September 7, 2020, an apartment complex named "The Residences at Main" was proposed, and would be built near the mall. On October 3, 2020, the project moved forward, but there was limited to no news after that. However, on October 15, 2021, construction would officially begin on the new project.

On February 14, 2022, the parking garage located near the entrance of Target, JCPenney, and two of the mall entrances, one located next to SeaQuest, and the other near Michael Kors and Sunglass Hut, collapsed, causing it to be closed indefinitely. On October 23, 2022, construction to rebuild the parking garage began. The parking garage reopened in October 2024.

On January 3, 2023, Unibail-Rodamco-Westfield sold this mall along with Westfield South Shore in Bay Shore, New York for a combined price of $196 million or roughly $100 million each to Namdar Realty Group. The mall was later renamed Trumbull Mall.

As of August 2023, the Town of Trumbull is currently discussing the future of the Trumbull Mall, with people deciding what the future has in store for Trumbull Mall. Some ideas people came up with were indoor pickleball courts, a concert venue, a rock climbing wall, Dave & Buster's, and a supermarket, specifically Whole Foods Market, Trader Joe's, Wegmans, Stew Leonard's, or Market 32. On June 26, 2023, Stew Leonard's CEO Stew Leonard Jr. told CT Insider that he could see a potential fit in the Trumbull Mall, but it would all have to vary on the traffic, stating that a Stew Leonard's supermarket usually requires a lot of foot traffic. If approved, this will be the fourth Stew Leonard's location in Connecticut, with the others in Danbury, Norwalk, and Newington. On September 28, 2023, the Town of Trumbull had another meeting discussing the future of Trumbull Mall. Some new development options were revealed, such as doubling down on retail, including several more stores, grocery, and entertainment, or a "commercial village" development that could include outdoor recreation, senior living, medical offices, or a hotel. They are also discussing on how to address the high crime and blight at the mall. The Town of Trumbull is hoping for discussing plans to be finalized by the end of 2023.

On August 16, 2023, it was announced that SeaQuest would permanently shutter its Trumbull location by August 20, 2023 after numerous controversies against customers and PETA for mistreatment and even abuse of animals, ending a four-year run to the controversial and heavily panned aquarium. The animals that were located in the aquarium will be shipped to other SeaQuest locations.

On September 6, 2024, Fun Spot Arcade, an arcade owned by the parent company of Chuck E. Cheese, opened its first location at the mall. In July 2025, it was announced that the arcade was rebranded as Chuck's Arcade as a result of CEC Entertainment retiring the Fun Spot Arcade name.

In June 2025, it was reported that Namdar Realty Group and Mason Asset Management would default on a $152.3 million debt loan for the mall, and would eventually sell management of the mall to Centennial Real Estate for an undisclosed amount. While Namdar has plans to discuss an extension for the debt payments with lenders, it has been speculated that they will sell the mall altogether as the company is now looking for other buyers to acquire ownership of the mall. The Town of Trumbull had previously given a warning notice to Namdar back in May 2025 to fix potholes located across the mall's surrounding road. Officials, employees, and customers reported in July 2025 that the air conditioning system was broken at several of the stores at the mall, and was left unrepaired since June, when Namdar and Mason were managing the mall. Ulta Beauty employee Susan Zimmermann stated, "It was pretty damn hot within the mall, particularly in the area around the food court. Customers were complaining. Two Saturdays ago, we had to close early it was so hot." Mall officials accused Namdar and Mason of not being interested in maintaining the property, the safety and overall experience of the customers and employees.

Centennial real estate has taken over management of the mall and has acted on several major issues. Their main priority is fixing the mall's air conditioning system. They have also acted on landscaping and pothole issues on the mall's property. Vicki Tesoro, Trumbull's first selectwoman, said that meeting with Centennial was "a breath of fresh air" and that she is "encouraged by the immediate steps Centennial is taking."

In September 2025, Ulta Beauty sued Namdar citing failure of heating, venting, and air conditioning has forced to temporarily close its Trumbull Mall location, and wants Namdar to terminate its 10 year lease at the Trumbull Mall.

In March 2026, following Namdar defaulting on its $152 million loan on the Trumbull Mall, it was announced that the mall will go up for sale. Soon after, in April 2026, Apple announced that it would be closing their Trumbull Mall location. No reason was given as to why Apple chosen to close its Trumbull Mall location. Trumbull government responded to the news saying “The Town of Trumbull is deeply disappointed by Apple’s decision to leave the Trumbull Mall. The region has come to depend on the store for technology services and for employment.”, and reached out to Apple corporate to reconsider their decision as well as encouraging customers to express their disappointment directly to Apple corporate to reconsider their decision. Apple closed its Trumbull location on June 20, 2026.

== See also ==
- Hawley Lane Mall – another shopping mall in Trumbull, Connecticut
