= Broadway Commons =

Coordinates: 40.773441°N 73.530872°W

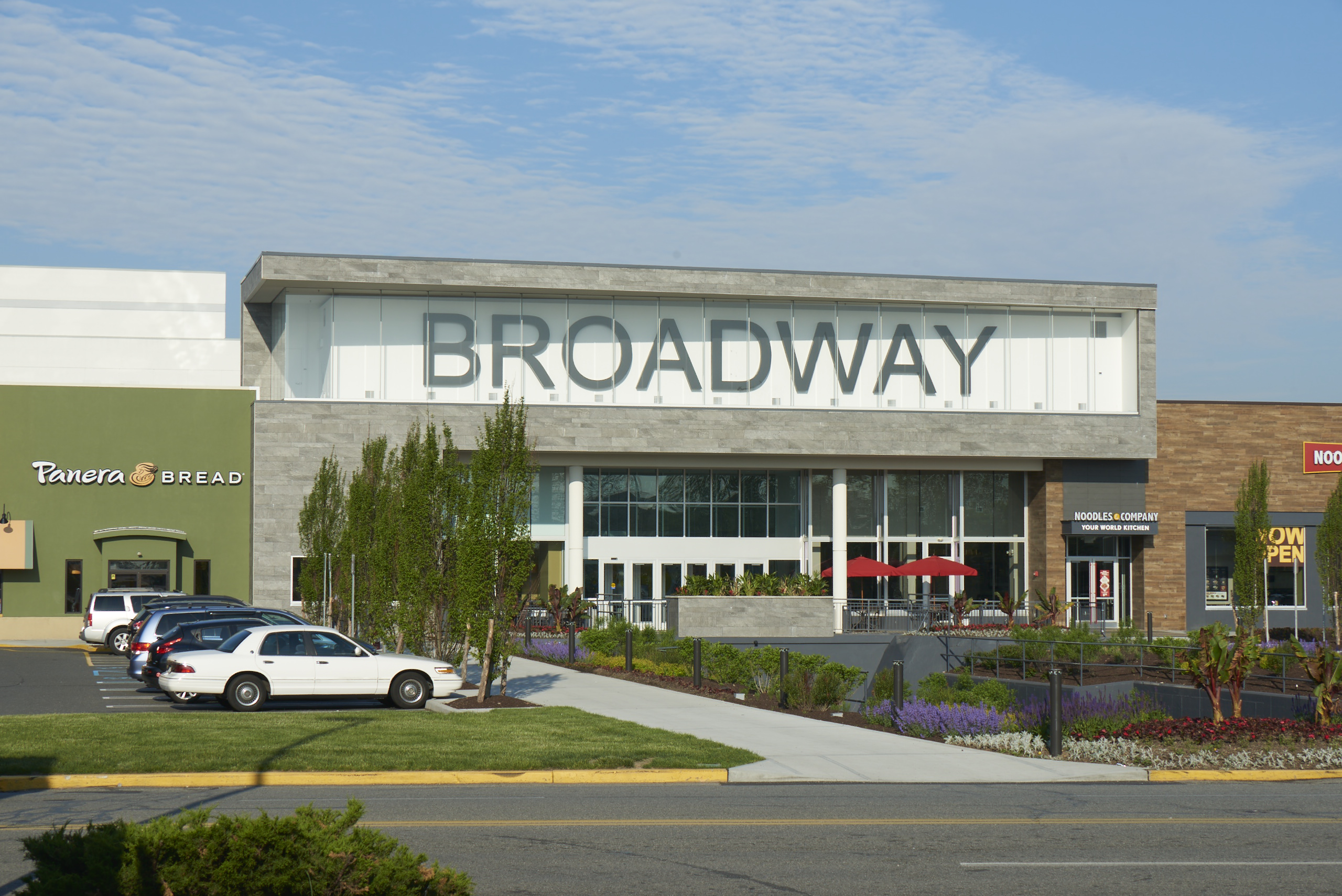
- Location: Hicksville, New York, U.S.
- Address: 358 N. Broadway
- Opened: October 25, 1956
- Closed: 2026 (enclosed mall)
- Owner: Pacific Retail
- Num. of stores: 98
- Num. of anchor tenants: 5
- Floor area: 1,200,000 sq ft (110,000 m^{2})
- Floors: 1 (2 in IKEA, 6 in former Macy's, Basement level in Round 1)
- Parking: Lighted Lot
- Public transit: Nassau Inter-County Express: n20H, n48, n49 Long Island Rail Road: at Hicksville (via bus)
- Website: atbroadwaycommons.com

Broadway Commons (formerly Broadway Mall) is a large shopping mall located in Hicksville, New York, United States. Opened in 1956 as an open-air shopping center called Mid-Island Shopping Plaza, it is currently a regional enclosed shopping center comprising 98 stores, as well as a food court and movie theater. The mall's anchor stores are IKEA, Target and Blink Fitness. The mall's interior closed in 2026 ahead of its planned redevelopment.

== History ==
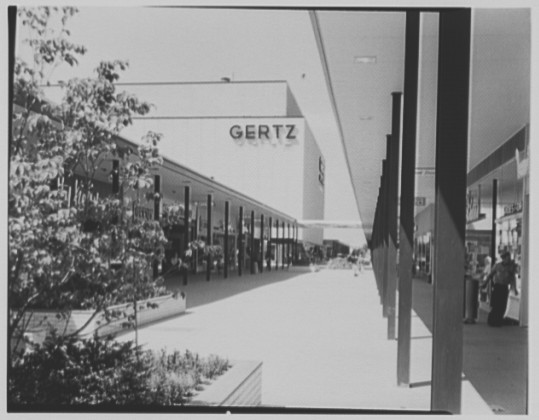
Gertz department store in Mid-Island Plaza in 1957

The Mid Island Shopping Plaza held its Grand Opening on October 25, 1956, on the site of a former boys' orphanage and a dairy and vegetable farm operated by the Catholic Church. It cost $40 million to construct and was built to accommodate more than 40,000 shoppers daily.

Beneath the mall was a truck tunnel that was nearly a mile long. In September 1957, the tunnel was designated as a Civil Defense operational headquarters, providing emergency accommodations for over 9,000 people.

The mall opened just as the population of Nassau County, Long Island, surged and the area became a major suburban population center. On September 28, 1960, Vice President Richard Nixon, then running for president, made a stop at the Mid Island Shopping Plaza, where he gave a campaign speech. The first addition to the shopping center came in the way of the Fox Plaza North and South Cinerama, which was built as a freestanding structure at the north end of the mall. One of America's earliest "shopping mall" twin-plex theaters, it showed its first feature in May 1964. The shopping center was enclosed in 1968, renamed Broadway Mall in 1989, renovated between 1987 and 1991, and completely redeveloped in 1995.

Allied Stores planned the center and Gertz, a department store based in Jamaica, Queens, built a five-level store to anchor the facility. The Gertz store was reported to be the tallest suburban department store ever built. Gertz also operated a branded auto-repair facility as a stand-alone building in the parking lot area. In the early 1980s, Gertz closed their Jamaica store, making this location its new flagship store, and the Gertz corporate staff was relocated to the fifth floor of the Broadway Mall location. In mid 1982, Allied merged its Gertz division into its Paramus, New Jersey–based Stern's division. All former Gertz locations were re-branded as Stern's in early 1983, and a regional corporate staff remained at the Broadway Mall store. The store was then rebranded as Macy's in 2001 when Federated Department Stores folded their Stern's Division.

Notable anchor stores in the 1960s and 1970s were Korvettes (where the present-day IKEA is located) and the Pathmark supermarket on the east wing. "My Pii" was a restaurant on the west end of the mall that featured then-unusual "gourmet" pizza in an atmosphere that featured low light settings and music through a specially designed high-end audio system. "Fly-Buy-Nite," a vendor of higher-end audio equipment, used a retired DC-7 aircraft as a showroom in the southwestern end of the parking lot near a "U.S. General" showroom (precursor to Harbor Freight).

In 1991, IKEA opened its second store in the New York Metropolitan Area at the mall. (The Elizabeth, New Jersey, IKEA store opened in 1990.) Until 2003, the store was not connected to the mall (although only about 20 feet separated the mall from the store). IKEA did, however, maintain a display in the center court where its mall entrance would eventually be. It is currently one of the only IKEA stores that is connected to a mall and has a mall entrance.

In October 1999, a single-level JCPenney opened. In January 2003, JCPenney closed. It was demolished and replaced by a Target, which opened on October 10, 2004.

The real estate group Vornado Realty Trust purchased Broadway Mall in 2005 for $153 million. Vornado sold the mall on February 14, 2014 to a partnership led by KKR at $94 million, losing them $13.4 million, as part of a plan to shelve its regional mall holdings.

On May 5, 2015, renderings surfaced on the homepage of the mall's website that appeared to depict a planned renovation. Renovations were announced for the fall, including new tenants, such as Noodles & Company, Blaze Pizza, Blink Fitness and Chick-Fil-A.

In January 2017, the mall's named was changed from Broadway Mall to Broadway Commons. In July 2017, a two-level (49,200 square foot) Round One Entertainment opened in space previously housing Steve & Barry's University Sportswear and Sam Goody music.

On January 8, 2020, Macy's announced the closure of their anchor store.

In 2024, the mall was sold to a local group, which announced plans to completely remodel it at a cost of $100 million. They plan to demolish the vacant Macy's anchor store, as well as the covered portions of the mall, making it an outdoor mall again. They plan to rename it The shops on Broadway.

In January 2025, Showcase Cinema De Lux announced its closure at the mall. The cinema finally closed on January 5.

== Redevelopment & closure ==
On January 1, 2026, all the stores in the top food court area closed down in preparation for the "dining and entertainment district" remodeling, with the last closing on New Year's Eve a day prior.

By July 2026, all of Broadway Commons’ indoor stores had closed as plans moved forward to redevelop the mall into an open-air shopping center.

In July 2026, a $200 million redevelopment plan was proposed to transform Broadway Commons into an open-air shopping and entertainment center named The Shops on Broadway. The plans include outdoor pedestrian areas, restaurants, an expanded IKEA store, a new BJ's Wholesale Club, and the demolition of the former Macy's building.

In October 2026, the Town of Oyster Bay approved five zoning variances for the project, with demolition expected to begin in early 2027. The redevelopment is expected to be completed by December 2028.
