= Stern's =

Department store chain in the northeast U.S.

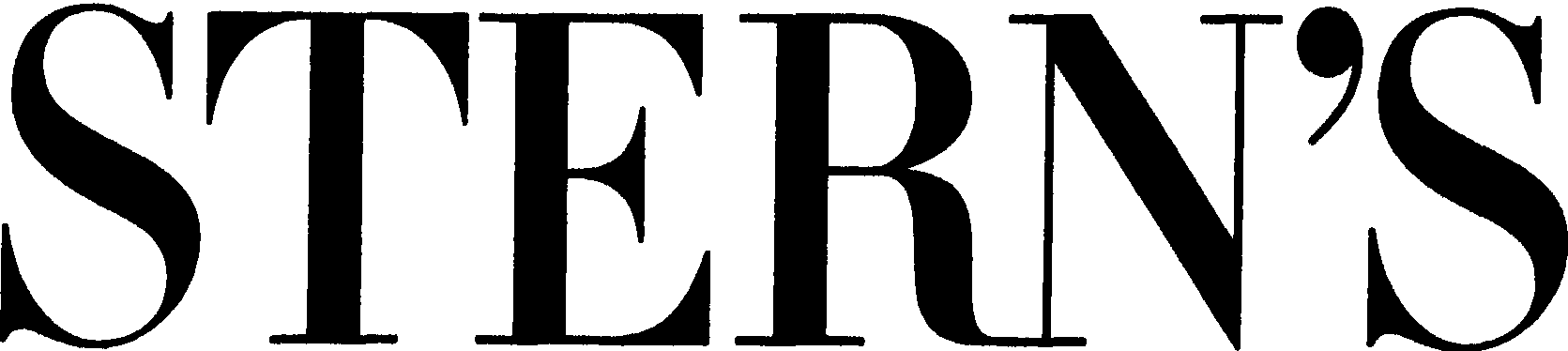
- The 1996-2001 logo

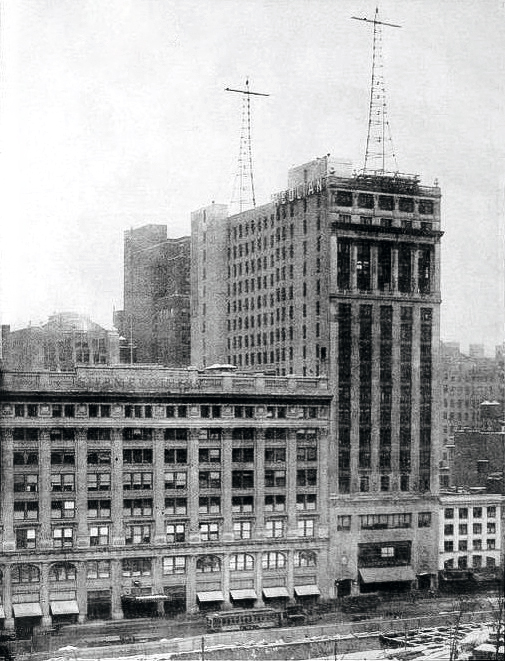
- Stern's (left) next to Aeolian Hall in Manhattan
- Type: Department store
- Industry: Retail
- Predecessor: Gertz (1918–1982)
- Founded: 1867 (159 years ago) (as Stern Brothers Department Store)
- Defunct: 2001 (25 years ago)
- Fate: Most stores folded into Macy's; Other stores converted to Bloomingdale's or were liquidated
- Successor: Macy's (2001–present); Bloomingdale's (2001–present)
- Headquarters: Paramus, New Jersey
- Products: Apparel, footwear, bedding, furniture, jewelry, beauty products, gifts and housewares.
- Parent: Allied Stores (1951–1992); Federated Department Stores, Inc. (1992–closure)

The 1974-1985 logo

Stern's was a regional department store chain serving the U.S. states of New York and New Jersey. The chain was in business for more than 130 years.

In 2001, Stern's parent company Federated Department Stores opted to retire the Stern's brand. Most of the stores were immediately converted to Stern's corporate sibling Macy's, some were liquidated and reopened as Bloomingdale's, and others were closed.

== History ==
Stern Brothers was founded in 1867 by Isaac, Louis and Benjamin Stern, sons of German Jewish immigrants. In that year, they began selling dry goods in Buffalo, New York.

The 1985-1996 logo

In 1868, they moved to New York City and opened a one-room store at 367 Sixth Avenue. In 1879, the store was again relocated to larger quarters at 110 West 23rd Street. Outgrowing the store at 110 West 23rd Street, Stern Brothers erected a new structure at the same location which became the new flagship store in 1878. It was noted for its cast-iron facade at 32 to 36 West 23rd Street and 23 to 35 West 22nd Street.

The building was designed by Henry Fernbach. It was enlarged according to a design by W.M. Schinckel in 1892. The enormous, six-story building was executed in the Renaissance Revival style. W.M. Schinckel's typically 19th century addition tripled the dimensions of the original structure on the eastern portion of the site. The tall central section of this addition animates the long and delicately detailed facade. The company's monogram is still located above the central arch. (This structure is still in use today. The first floor houses a Home Depot, while the upper floors are showrooms.). Many members of the Stern family worked in this store, which carried both luxury goods and merchandise for the working classes. It was an elegant store noted for its fashionable clothes. Ladies from all over the city came to Stern Brothers for their Paris fashions. This enterprise was distinguished by its elegant door men in top hats and the generous and friendly service of the Sterns themselves.

Stern Brothers was a family business. The family for decades ran the store and family members filled the many positions in the store. However, Robert (1888-1954), the son of founder Issac Stern, changed his last name to Stearns and founded the investment bank Bear Stearns in 1923.

It was not uncommon for customers to be greeted by the brothers themselves. The family was joined by Arthur D. Brandeis in 1914. His daughter, Aliss Ruth had married Irving C. Stern, one of the directors of Stern Brothers and son of founder Louis Stern. Brandeis was president of J. L. Brandeis and Sons of Omaha, Nebraska, the biggest department store west of Chicago.

In 1913, Stern Brothers moved farther uptown and built a new flagship store near Fifth Avenue and West 42nd Street across from Bryant Park. The new store had nine floors with the buying offices located in the basement. Stern's catered to the Carriage Trade and had a separate entrance for customers like the Goulds and Astors. Since the store was near the Theater District, many up and coming stars worked in the store. The busy hours of the store were between 11am to 2pm, when local workers from the area were on their lunch break.

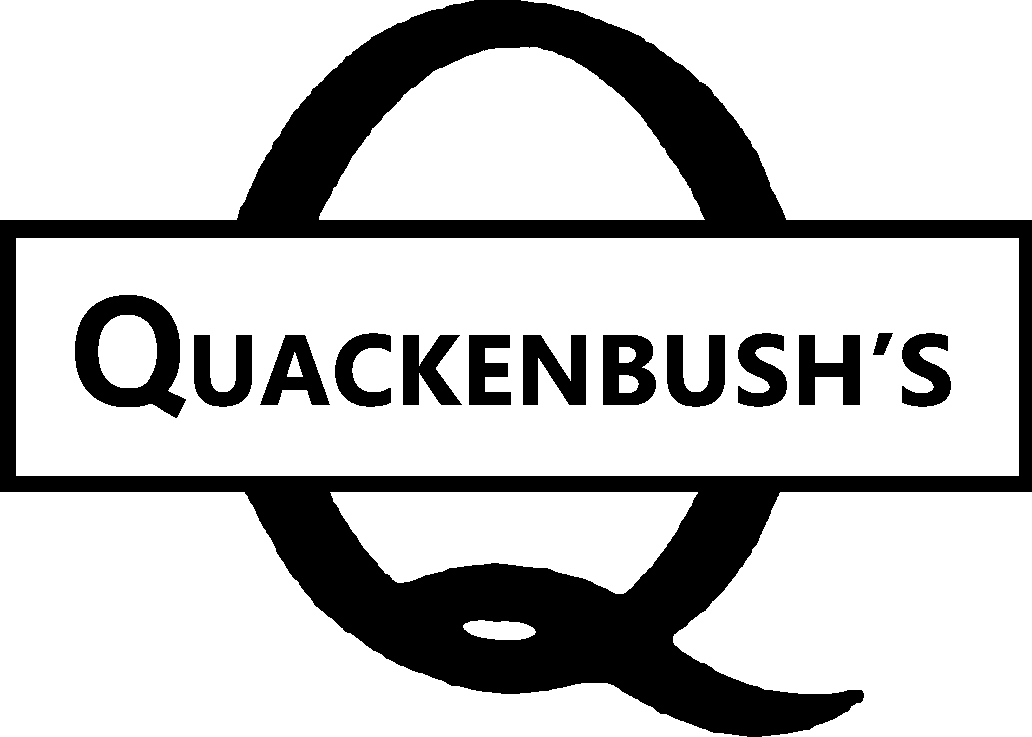
Quackenbush's department stores were rebranded as Stern's in the early 1960s

Stern's was purchased by Allied Stores in 1951. During the late 1950s and early 1960s, sales began to decline as most white New Yorkers moved to the suburbs. Stern's closed its flagship in New York in 1969 and moved their corporate headquarters to their store in Paramus, New Jersey's Bergen Mall, which became the flagship. At that time Stern's owner, Allied Stores Stern's merged the division with its Quackenbush division in Paterson, New Jersey. There was a second Quackenbush store in the Preakness section of Wayne, New Jersey; in the same year that Stern's moved its base to New Jersey it opened a second location in Wayne that served as the fourth anchor for the newly constructed Willowbrook Mall. Eventually the downtown Paterson store was closed. Stern's opened a new full line store in the Woodbridge Center Mall in 1971. Additional stores followed at Middlesex Mall, Essex Green, Seaview Square Mall, Ocean County Mall amongst others. The store briefly entered the Philadelphia market acquiring several locations of Gimbels Philadelphia division.

== Chronology ==
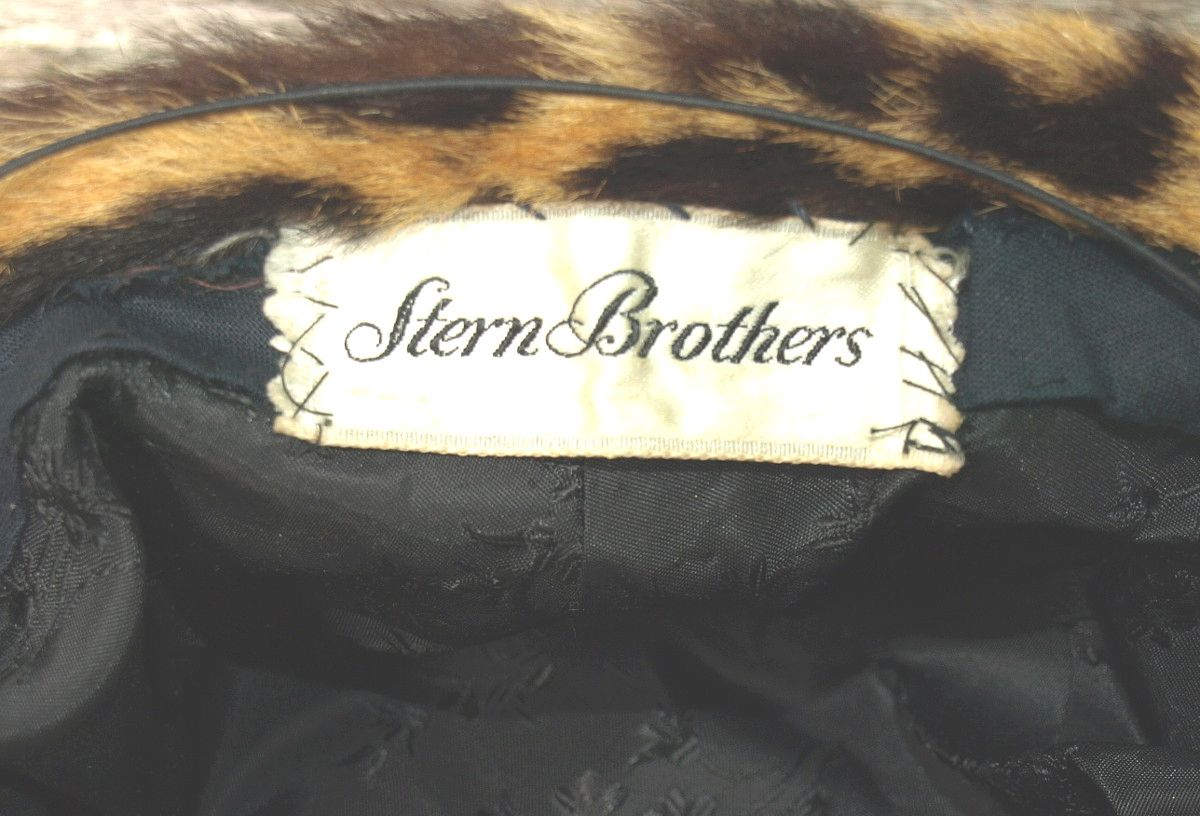
Stern Brothers label in a women's jaguar cap (c. 1975)

- 1867: Stern Brothers' Department Store is founded in Buffalo, New York. by the Stern brothers, recent immigrants from Ziegenhain, (Schwalm-Eder-Kreis), Germany.
- 1867: Stern Brothers relocates to New York City and operates a one-room store at 367 Sixth Avenue.
- 1877: Moves to larger quarters at 111 West 23rd Street.
- 1878: Erected its 23rd Street flagship, noted for its cast-iron facade.
- 1913: New flagship erected near Fifth Avenue and 42nd Street.
- 1914: Arthur D. Brandeis joins firm as Senior Vice President.
- 1922: Louis Stern, founder dies in Paris while visiting his daughter.
- 1925: Company fell out of family hands, and common stock was issued by a new owner, a banking conglomerate.
- 1951: Stern Brothers is acquired by Allied Stores Corporation.
- 1969: Flagship store on 42nd Street is closed, Bergen Mall location designated new headquarters and flagship.
- 1982: Allied Stores Corporation's Gertz division on Long Island was merged into Stern's which by then operated primarily in New Jersey.
- 1986: Stern's acquires several stores from Gimbels, and enters the Philadelphia market.
- 1986: Campeau Corporation acquires Allied.
- 1988: Campeau acquires Federated Department Stores (FDS). Beginning of Allied/FDS "tandem" operations. Five of the seven locations in the Philadelphia market are closed (all former Gimbels).
- 1992: Remaining 2 locations in the Philadelphia market are closed.
- 1992: Allied is fully merged into FDS.
- 1995: Five locations of Abraham & Straus are converted to new Stern's stores. The Stern's store at Sunrise Mall relocates to a former location of Abraham & Straus.
- 2001: FDS closes its Stern's division. Most of the Stern's locations are converted to Macy's immediately. Others are liquidated, with these stores either becoming Bloomingdale's or closing altogether (Manhattan Mall location is one of these, and laid vacant, until it was redeveloped into office space, with the lower floors housing a J.C. Penney from 2009 until 2020).

== See also ==
- List of department stores converted to Macy's
