= Hawley Lane Mall =

- Location: Trumbull, Connecticut, United States
- Coordinates: 41.233°N 73.151°W
- Address: 120 Hawley Lane
- Opened: 1971
- Owner: National Realty and Development Corp.
- Num. of stores: 18
- Num. of anchor tenants: 4
- Floor area: 462,000 square feet (42,900 m^{2})
- Floors: 2
- Website: nrdc.com/properties

Hawley Lane Mall is one of two shopping malls in Trumbull, Connecticut, United States, located near Exit 5 of Route 8 and Exits 33-34 of the Merritt Parkway. Current anchor stores include Best Buy, Kohl's, and Target.

== History ==
Hawley Lane Mall opened in 1971 with two anchor stores, Caldor (featuring a two-story design and belt escalators) and a Waldbaum's supermarket. Other, smaller stores such as B. Dalton booksellers and Hawley Lane Shoes have also called the mall home. A third anchor store, Sage-Allen took up residence on the mall's new upper level in 1982. During the late 1980s and early 1990s, the mall became less profitable due to expansions at both the Milford Crossroads and Trumbull Shopping Park malls. Sage-Allen went out of business in 1993, merging with to become Filene's, which in turn closed the Hawley Lane store so as not to compete with its larger locations in both Milford and Trumbull. Steinbach then took over the space between 1997 and 1999 before they went bankrupt. Caldor also went bankrupt in 1999, while at the same time all Waldbaum's stores closed and left the state. This left the mall with no anchor stores.

=== Sale and new era ===
Shortly after purchasing the mall, National Realty and Development Corp. spent $8 million on a refit of the entire property in 2005. The firm also managed to add Kohl's and then HomeGoods as new anchor stores, which were quickly followed by Target and Best Buy. Target broke ground in late 2004, and at 124,500 square feet (11,570 m^{2}), it represents one fourth of the mall's size.

In October 2023, it was announced that HomeGoods would be relocating to a new location in a former Bed Bath & Beyond in Shelton. The new store opened on October 26, 2023.

In March 2024, it was announced that Ross Dress For Less would be opening a new location in the old HomeGoods space. This would mark Connecticut's first Ross location. The store opened in 2025.

== Transportation ==
Bus transportation is available via the Greater Bridgeport Transit Authority, along with taxi service.

== See also ==
- Trumbull Mall, another mall in the same town.
