= Bon Marche Department Store =

Historic building in Seattle, Washington, U.S.

- Bon Marché Department Store
- U.S. National Register of Historic Places
- Washington Heritage Register
- Seattle Landmark
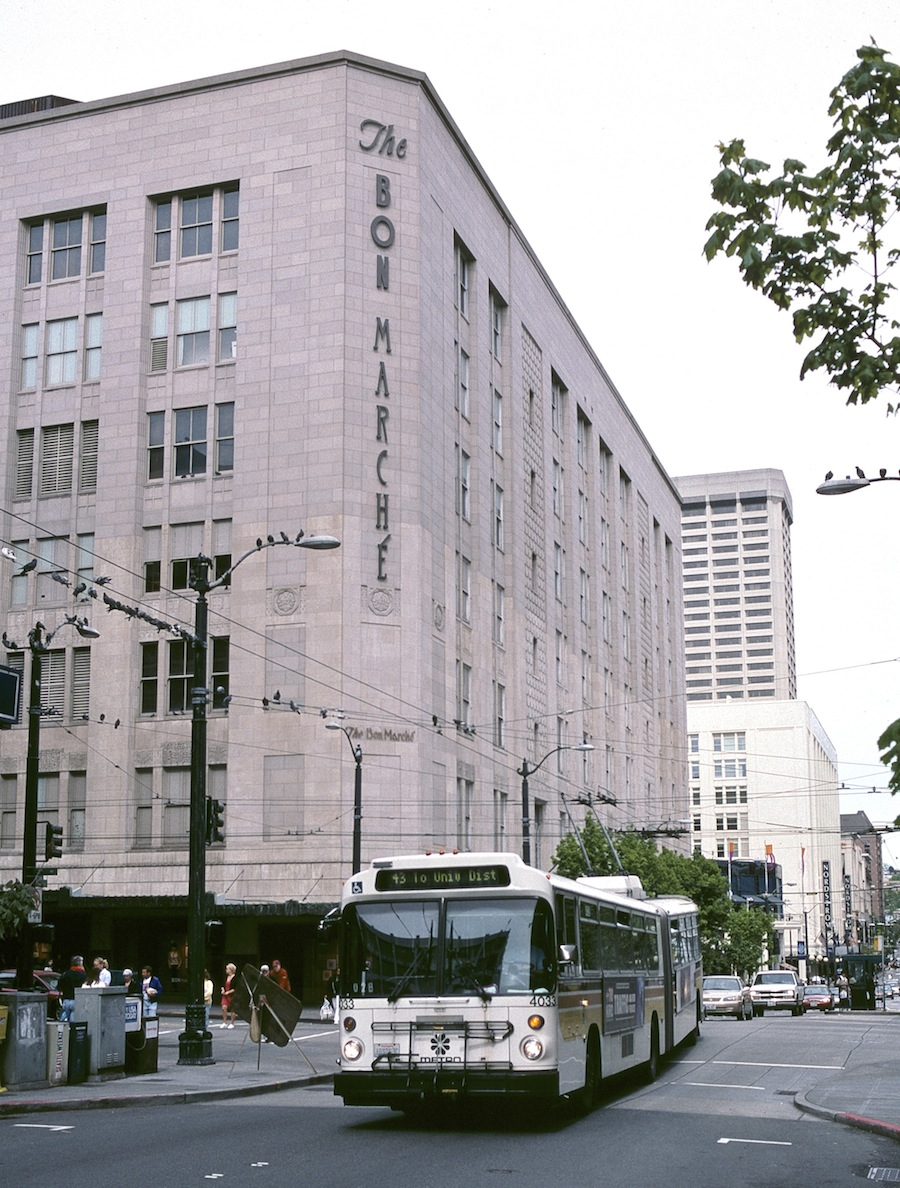
- The Bon Marché's flagship store, 2000

- Location within Washington (state)
- Location: 300 Pine Street; Seattle, Washington
- Built: 1929
- Architect: John Graham, Sr.
- Architectural style: Art Deco
- NRHP reference No.: 16000830

Significant dates
- Added to NRHP: December 6, 2016
- Designated WHR: October 7, 2016
- Designated SEATL: October 16, 1989

The Bon Marché Department Store (also known as the Bon Marché Building and the Macy's Building) is a building in Seattle listed on the National Register of Historic Places.

== History ==
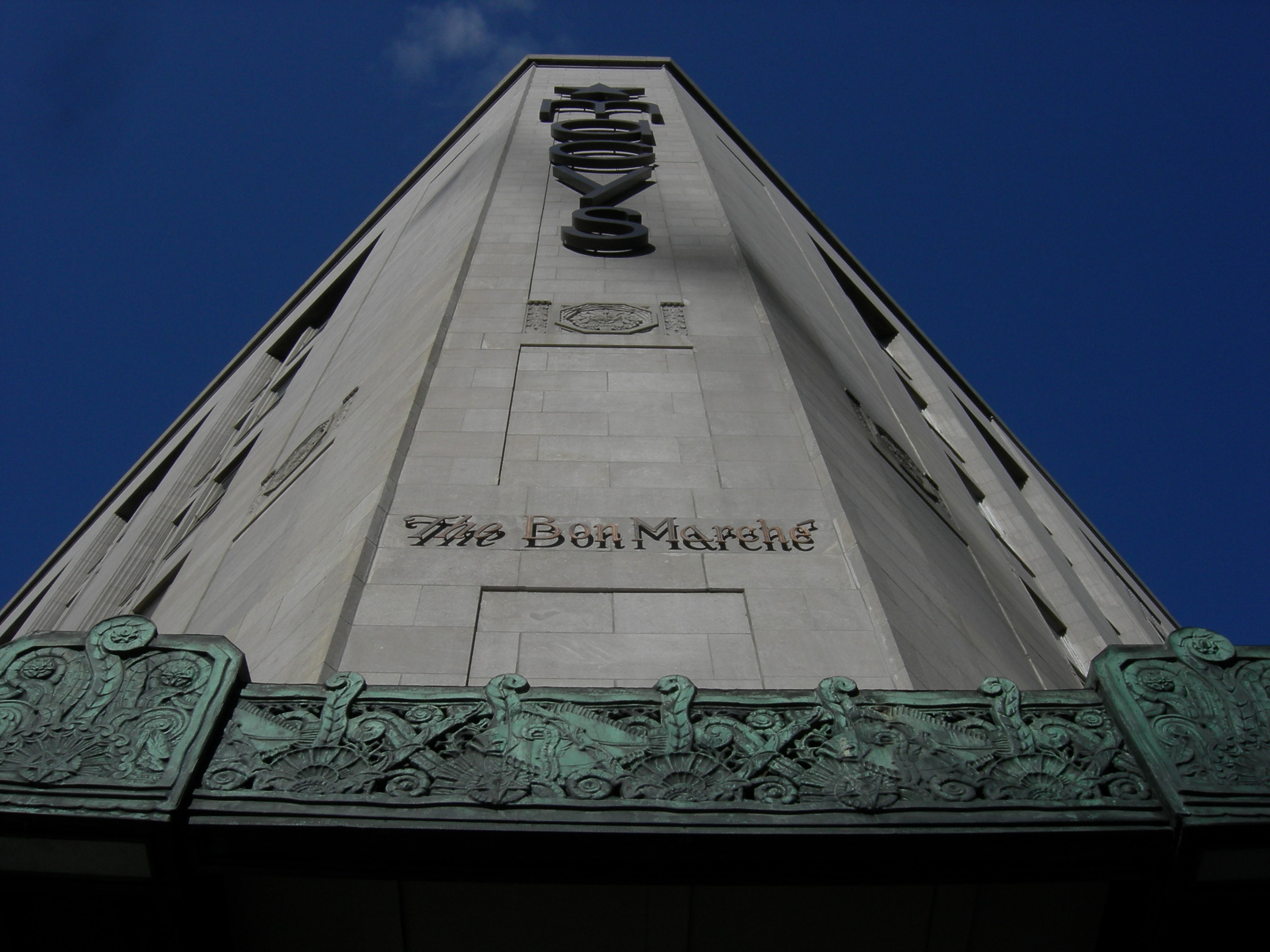
Exterior signage

The building was designed by John Graham, Sr. Construction began in February 1928 and the store opened in August 1929. The building served as The Bon Marché's flagship store. The location included a drugstore and sold a variety of department-store items including clothing, hunting and fishing gear, music, and books.

The Bon Marché had a reputation for better bargains than Seattle's other major department stores of the 20th century: Nordstrom and Frederick and & Nelson. Frederick & Nelson's store was one block away from the Bon Marché flagship, so the two were often compared. The Cube and Tiger Shop, the Bon Marché's clothing line for youth, set fashion trends for a long time in the Pacific Northwest. However, Frederick & Nelson was remembered as the place youth would buy their first formal clothing or dine in a tea room.

=== Fair hiring protest ===
In 1963, Seattle's Congress of Racial Equality (CORE) decided to protest downtown Seattle department stores for discriminatory hiring practices. They began employment negotiations with the Bon Marché flagship because it employed no Black workers except for its cleaning staff and waiters.

When negotiations stalled after several months, Mance Jackson and Jean Durning called for a June 15 march to begin store picketing. Everett Jensen and other local church leaders amplified the protest, and the Bon Marché hired 25 Black employees the week before the march to try to halt it. Over 1,000 people marched from Mount Zion Baptist Church to downtown, led by Jackson, Samuel B. McKinney, and Reginald Alleyne, but they called off the picket due to the Bon Marché's hiring change.

=== Macy's ===
In 1992, the Bon Marché was bought, and the store was later operated by Macy's. All Bon Marché full-service restaurants closed in 1995, with the Cascade Room closing downtown and Cafe Frango moving up to the sixth floor of the building, combining its previous fare with deli food.

In 2003 the Bon Marché was renamed Bon-Macy's, and after a year it rebranded to Macy's alone. In 2005, many of the Bon Marché signage came off the flagship building, and parties were hosted to commemorate the name change. Executives decided to bid on the building's bronze plaques, with some donated to Seattle's Museum of History & Industry. However, bronze signs spelling out "The Bon Marché" remained over some window canopies due to historic place requirements.

Macy's sold the upper 6 levels of the flagship store in 2015 to Starwood Capital. That portion of the building was remodeled into a 475,000-square-foot (44,100 m^{2}) office complex for Amazon. Macy's remained on the lower two floors and in the basement.

On February 23, 2020, the Macy's closed the store and the building was sold to Starwood.

=== Uniqlo ===
In November 2022, Uniqlo opened a store on the ground floor.

== See also ==
- National Register of Historic Places listings in Seattle
