= Gertz (department store) =

American department store chain

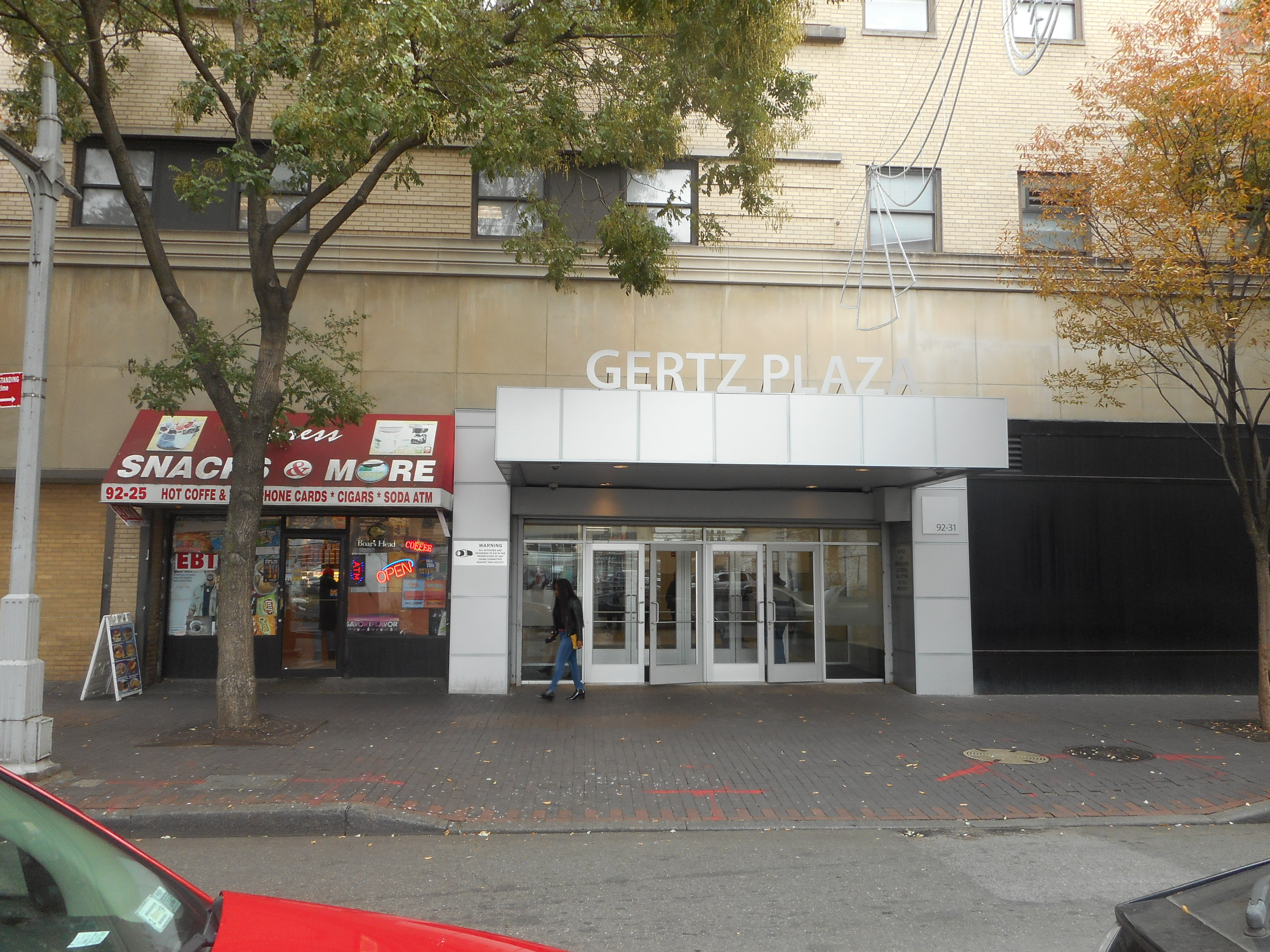
- The shopping plaza in Jamaica, Queens which originally served as the Gertz flagship store.
- Type: Department store
- Founded: 1918; 108 years ago
- Founder: Benjamin Gertz
- Defunct: 1982; 44 years ago
- Fate: Folded into Stern's
- Successor: Stern's (1982–2001); Macy's (2001–present)
- Area served: New York metropolitan area
- Parent: Allied Stores

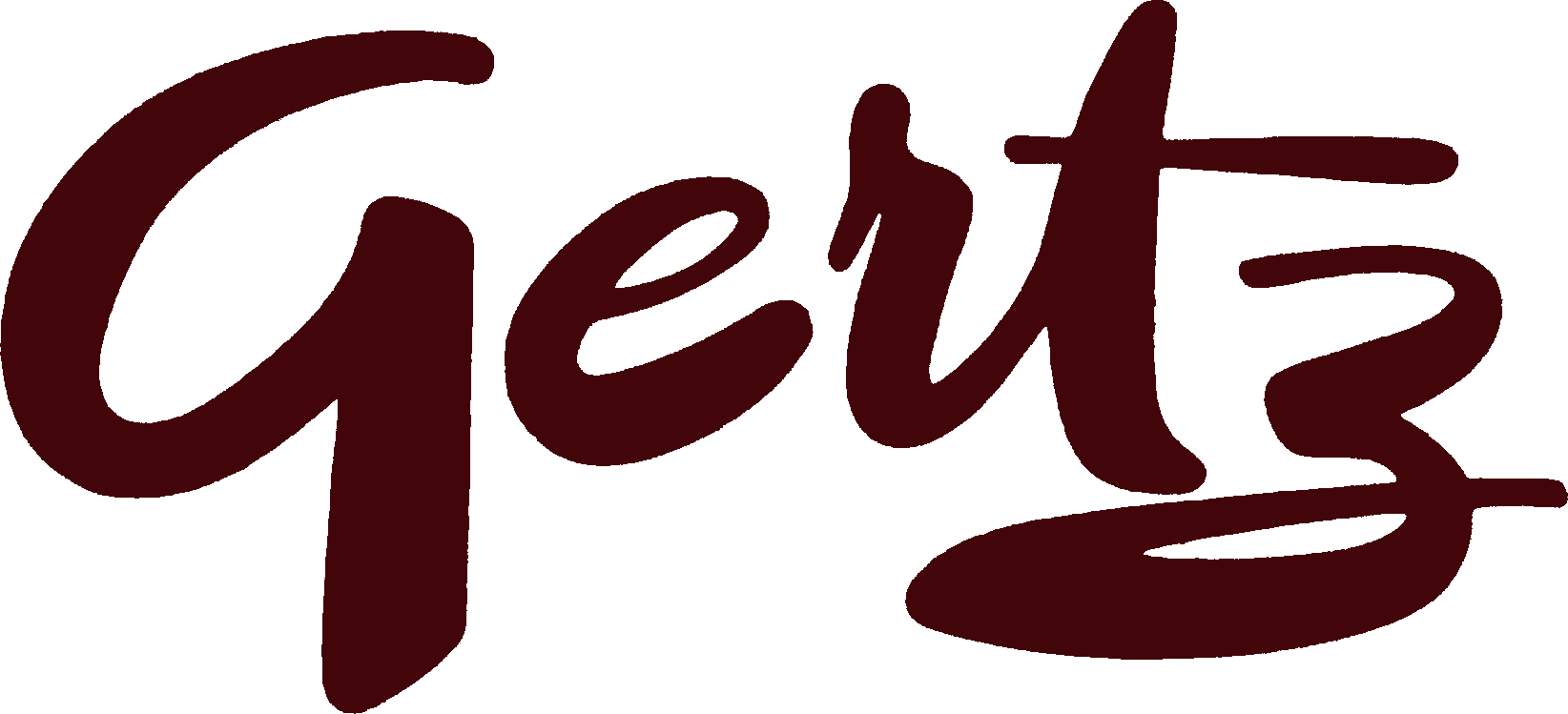
Gertz Department Store Final Logo

Gertz was a New York-based department store, headquartered in Jamaica, Queens. Founded in 1918 by Benjamin Gertz, along with his five sons, the company was acquired by Allied Stores in 1941.

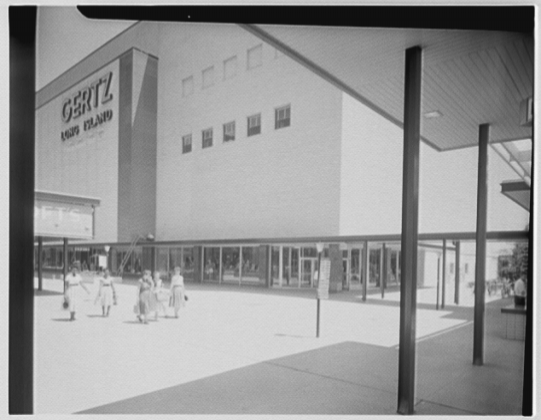
Gertz department store in Mid-Island Plaza in Hicksville, New York in 1957

Gertz had branch stores in Douglaston, Flushing, Great Neck, Hicksville, Massapequa, Bay Shore, Lake Grove, and East Hampton. The 300,000 square foot Hicksville location was opened in 1956 in the Mid-Island Plaza, known today as Broadway Commons; that store would eventually become Sterns in 1983, followed by Macy's in 2001. Currently the building is vacant as of Macy's closing in the spring of 2020. In 1981, Gertz opened at two former Korvette's locations in Douglaston and Lake Grove, but that year, changing demographics caused the company's first store closure, its flagship Jamaica location. Later, the Bay Shore location was converted to a Stern's and then a Macy's. After Macy's closed the location, the building was demolished and a Lowe's was built on the site.

== See also ==
- List of department stores converted to Macy's
