= Read's Department Stores =

Now-defunct department store chain

D.M. Read's Department Stores, Inc.
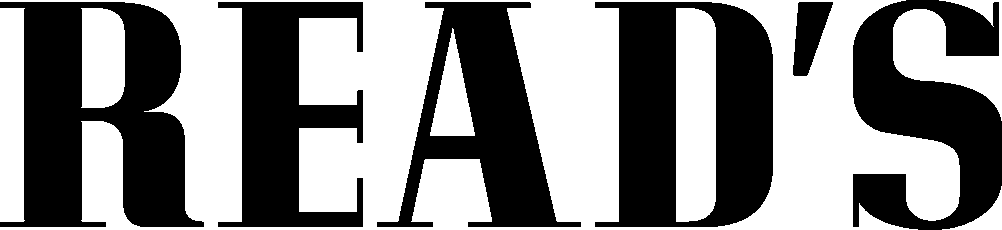

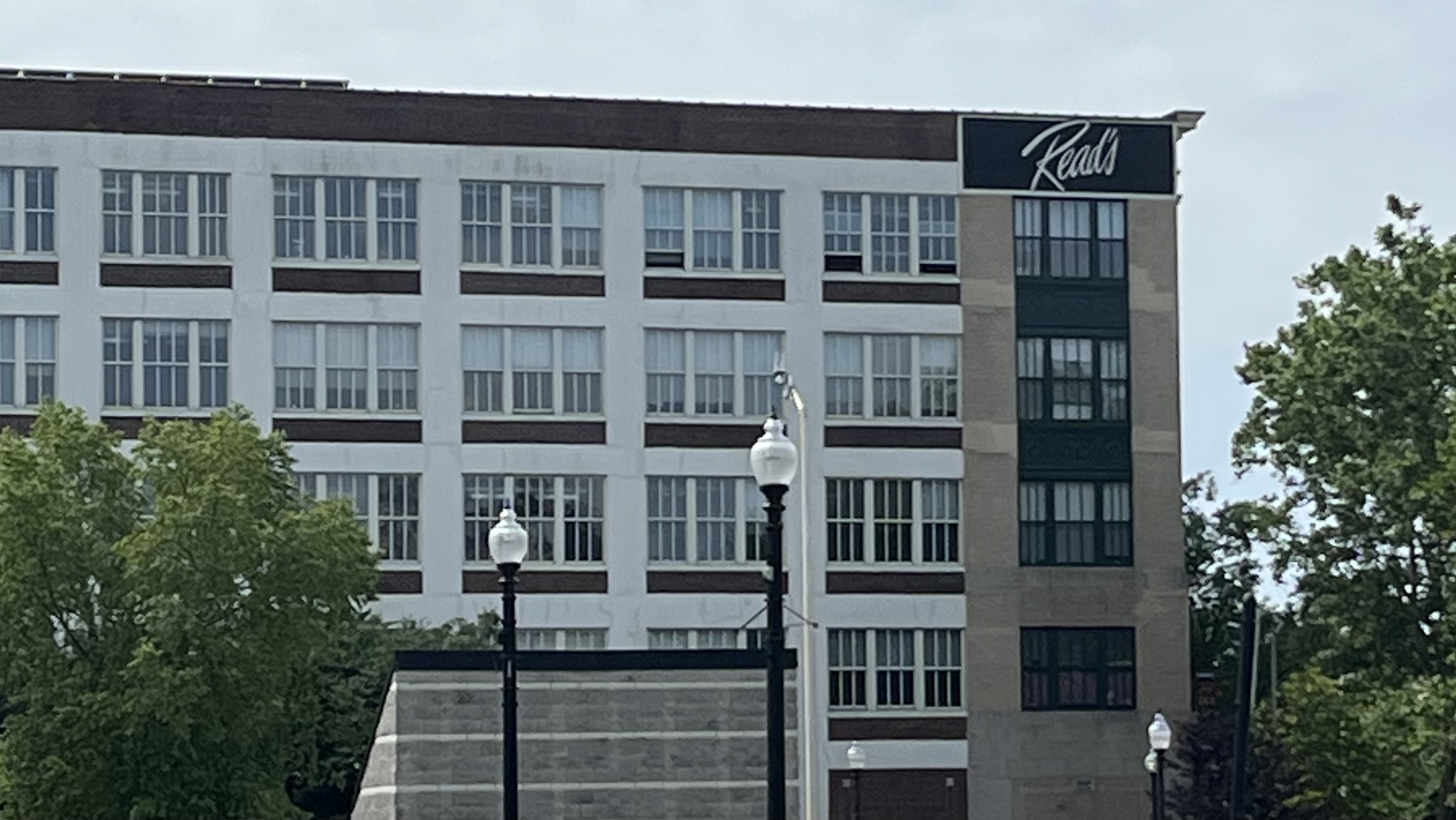
- Industry: Retail chain, Department store chain
- Founded: 1857
- Defunct: 1993
- Fate: Acquired
- Successor: Parent company merged it with Jordan Marsh in 1987, which in 1992 merged with Federated Department Stores (today Macy's)
- Headquarters: Bridgeport, Connecticut
- Area served: Connecticut, Westchester County, New York
- Key people: D. M. Read, Founder
- Products: Clothing, footwear, sporting goods, toys, jewelry, beauty products, housewares, furniture, bedding and discount goods
- Parent: Allied Stores, since 1954

Read's Department Stores was a Bridgeport, Connecticut-based retail chain founded in 1857 by D. M. Read. Known for its classy, upscale merchandise, the flagship store was once hailed as New England's largest department store. It expanded to several other locations in the 1950s and 1960s, but these closed progressively through the 1980s and 1990s.

The Flagship Bridgeport store closed in 1981 when Read's moved to a new location a few blocks away. The former location was later extensively renovated and reopened as Read's Artspace, also known as the Sterling Market Lofts building.

== Founding and growth ==
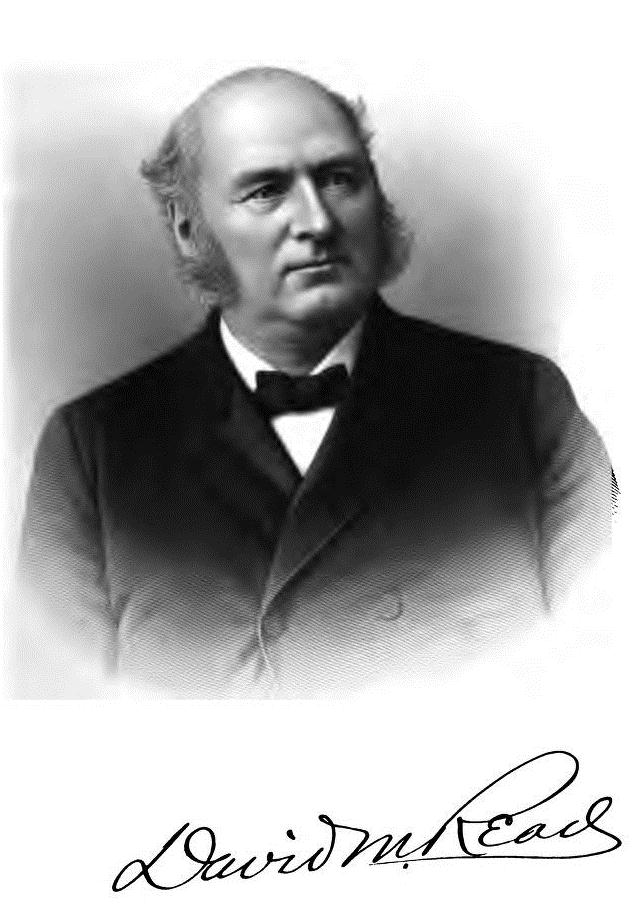

In 1857, David M. Read and W. B. Hall opened a dry goods and carpet store on Main Street in Bridgeport, Connecticut, with Read going solo in 1877. In 1885, the business expanded to two buildings on Main Street and Fairfield Avenue forming a "very popular and elegant place of business." Read's became known for its classy, upscale merchandise and shopping environment, becoming New England's largest department store.

== Flagship store ==
In 1926, Read's moved to the corner of Broad and John Streets in downtown Bridgeport, where its flagship store ultimately had over 100,000 square feet (10,000 m^{2}) of selling area on five floors. D.M. Read Company became a unit of Allied Stores in 1954.

The store had seven floors, five above ground and two below, and sold all sorts of items which according to the Bridgeport store directory were:

Downstairs China • Glassware • Silver • Gifts • Lamps • Housewares

Street Floor Jewelry • Watch Repair • Cosmetics • Gloves • Small Leather Goods • Belts • Handbags • Fashion Accessories • Neckwear • Hosiery • Casual Shoe Bar • Hat Bar • Umbrellas • Blouses • Street Floor Sportswear • Street Floor Lingerie • Fashion Shoes • Corner I • Notions • Stationery • Cameras • Luggage • Confections • Snack Shop John Street Men's Furnishings • Men's Sportswear • Men's Clothing • Men's Shoes • Men's Hats East Building Appliance Center Post Office Arcade Casual Shop

Second Floor Domestics • Curtains • Draperies • Slipcovers • Portrait Studio Young World Shops Infants' Shop • 2-to-6 Shop • Boys' Shop • Girls' Shop • Subteen Shop • Teen Shop • Young World Shoes • Children's Furniture

Third Floor Sportswear • Dresses • Daytime Dresses • Coats • Suits • Town and Country Shop • Fairfield Room • Millinery • Fur Salon • Bride's Shop • Uniforms • Maternity Shop • Lingerie • Foundations • At Ease Shop Jr. News Jr. Dresses • Jr. Coats • Jr. Sportswear

Fourth Floor Bedding • Furniture • Rugs • Broadloom • Photo Studio • Trim-a-Home Shop • Beauty Salon

Fifth Floor Toyland • Bicycles • Outdoor Equipment • Books • Venetian Tea Room • Offices

== Branch stores ==
The second store was built as one of the two anchors in the new Trumbull Shopping Park(the state's first mall), 6.7 miles from downtown Bridgeport. The store had three floors, (220,000 ft^{2} (20,000 m^{2})), and was located in the south section of the mall where Target stands today.

Allied expanded the store into a chain in the 1960s thru the 1980s. By then they were up to six stores in Fairfield and New Haven Counties in Connecticut, and Westchester County in New York.

== Transition ==
In 1981, Allied closed Read's landmark downtown store, leaving behind a boarded-up building as a reminder of Bridgeport's brighter past. It moved the store into space recently vacated by Gimbel's at the nearby Lafayette Plaza Mall in downtown Bridgeport.

In 1983, Read's opened a New York location in the Jefferson Valley Mall in Yorktown Heights. Around 1985 its television and radio commercials featured the jingle, "Reads, Your Something Special Store". Read's operated in its hometown of Bridgeport until 1987 when Campeau Corp. of Canada, which had bought Allied Stores earlier, merged it into Allied's sister division, Jordan Marsh of Boston, Massachusetts, and the stores subsequently took on the Jordan Marsh name.

In 1987, Campeau acquired Federated Department Stores of Cincinnati, Ohio and operated it in conjunction with Allied. As a result of the overall decline of Bridgeport's downtown shopping area, the Lafayette Plaza Jordan Marsh store closed in 1991, and all but the Trumbull and Jefferson Valley stores were closed by 1993 under the Federated/Allied Stores bankruptcy filing.

In 1993, these remaining two stores at Trumbull and Jefferson Valley were converted to the Abraham & Straus nameplate when that division of Federated Department Stores merged with Jordan Marsh (as they were in the New York Metropolitan media market, they could operate more efficiently regarding advertising under the A&S name). In 1995 after Federated acquired Macy's, it consolidated its A&S/Jordan Marsh division into Macy's East and renamed the two former Read's stores with the Macy's moniker.

The former Read's Trumbull location was abandoned in 2006, when Macy's relocated into the former Filene's store in the Westfield Trumbull shopping center upon the completion of the merger of the Federated and May Department Stores chains. Only the Jefferson Valley Mall store that Read's opened in 1983 has continually operated as a department store to present day.

== Read's Artspace, Bridgeport ==
In the late 1990s the former Read's Building in downtown Bridgeport was converted into useful space for artists, run as a non-profit, called Artspace, also known as Read's Artspace, Sterling Market Lofts, The conversion and complete restoration of the building by Artspace Projects cost $14.1 million, and created "61 spacious live/work units on the upper floors and arts-friendly commercial space on the ground floor". Construction was carried out by A.P. Construction, under a contract worth $10,500,000. The new Sterling Market Lofts building opened in May 2005.

== See also ==
- History of Bridgeport, Connecticut
- List of department stores converted to Macy's
- List of defunct department stores of the United States
