= Artspace Projects =

American nonprofit placemaking organization

Artspace Projects, Inc is a nonprofit organization based in Minneapolis, Minnesota that develops performance spaces for artists, otherwise known as placemaking.

== Description ==
Artspace Projects has its headquarters in Minneapolis, and also has offices in Los Angeles, New Orleans, New York City, Seattle and Washington DC. The organization seeks to provide affordable live/work space to artists and arts organizations. As of July 2022 Artspace has 57 properties in operation around the country.

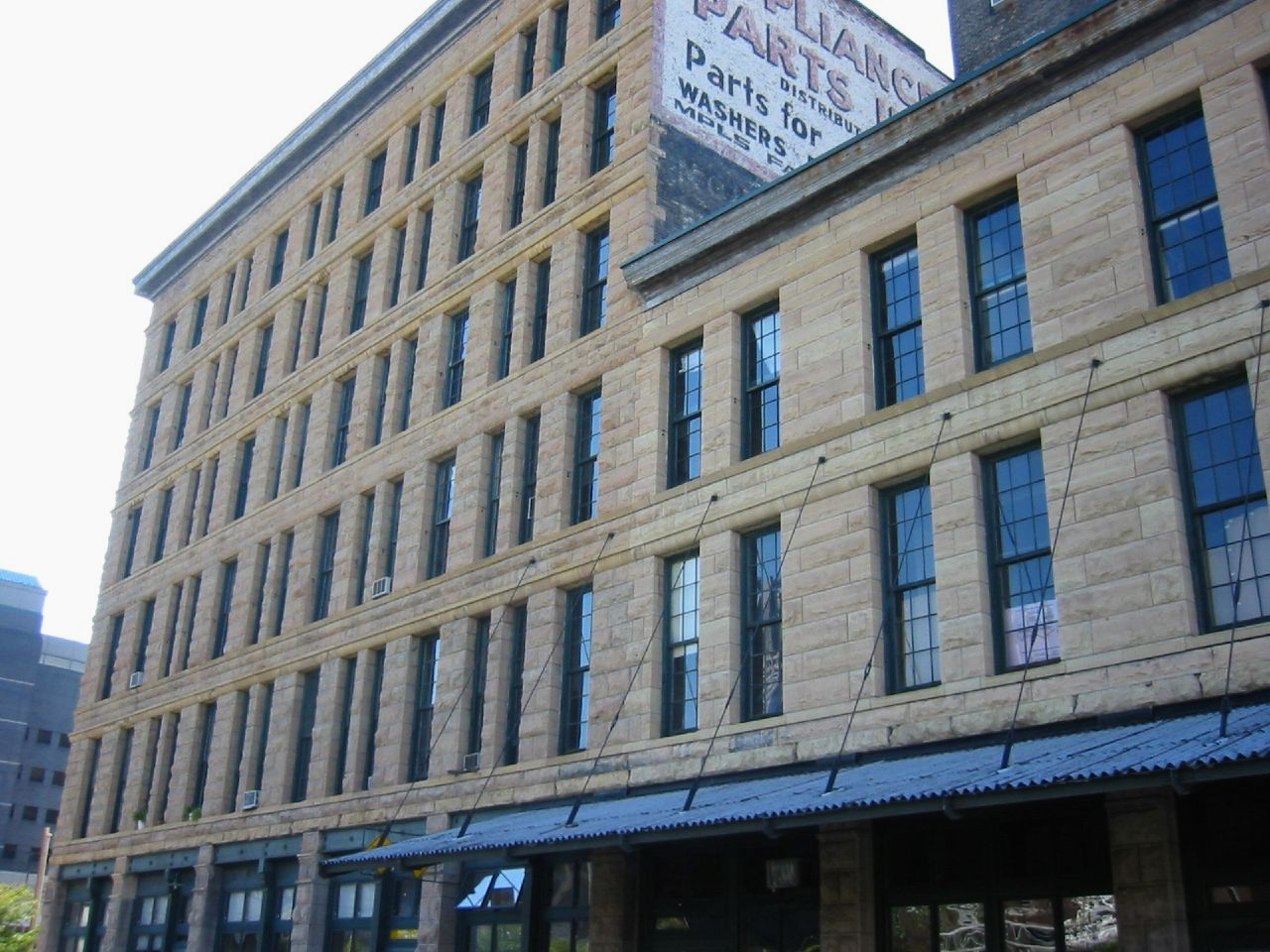
Traffic Zone Center for Visual Art, and Artspace Headquarters

One of these is in the old Read's Department Store building in Bridgeport, Connecticut, known as Artspace Read's, which opened in May 2005 after a full restoration and conversion of the building (also known as the Sterling Market Lofts building).

== Programs ==
Artspace programs fall in three broad categories: property development, asset management and national consulting.

=== Property development ===
Development projects, which typically involve the adaptive reuse of older buildings but can also involve new construction, are the most visible of Artspace's activities.

=== Asset management ===
Artspace owns or co-owns all the buildings it develops. Revenues in excess of expenses are set aside for preventive maintenance, commons area improvements, and building upgrades.

=== Consulting services ===
In addition to its roles as developer, owner, and manager, Artspace acts as a consultant to communities, organizations, and individuals seeking information and advice about developing affordable housing and work space for artists, performing arts centers, and cultural districts, often within the context of historic preservation.
