= The Bon Marché =

Department store chain based in Seattle

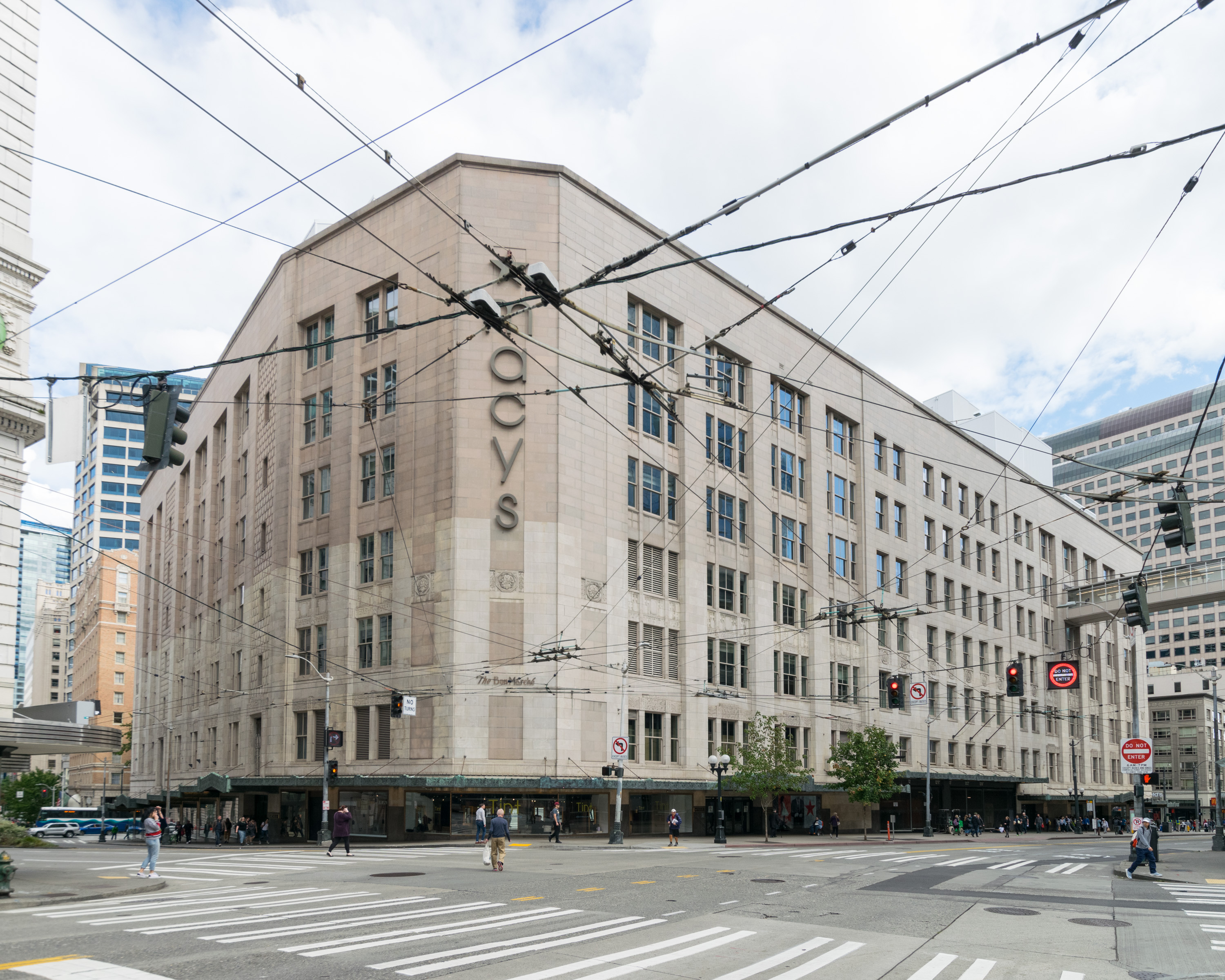
- Exterior of the former flagship store after conversion to Macy's (2016)
- Formerly: Bon–Macy's (2003–2005)
- Type: Subsidiary
- Industry: Retail
- Genre: Department stores
- Founded: 1890; 136 years ago in Seattle, Washington, United States
- Founders: Edward Nordhoff; Josephine Nordhoff
- Defunct: March 6, 2005; 21 years ago
- Fate: Rebranded by Federated Department Stores
- Successor: Macy's
- Headquarters: Seattle, Washington, United States
- Number of locations: 50 (2004)
- Areas served: Idaho; Montana; Oregon; Washington; Wyoming
- Products: Clothing; footwear; bedding; furniture; jewelry; beauty products; housewares
- Parent: Hahn Department Stores (1929–1934); Allied Stores (1934–1992); Federated Department Stores (1992–2005)

The Bon Marché (Note: English: "the good market" or "the good deal") (colloquially The Bon) was an American department store chain founded in 1890 in Seattle, Washington by Edward and Josephine Nordhoff. The name of the store was inspired by the Parisian department store Le Bon Marché.

The Bon Marché was acquired by Hahn Department Stores in 1929, which itself was acquired by Allied Stores in 1934. Allied Stores was merged into Federated Department Stores in 1992.

As part of its national rebranding program, Federated changed the name to Bon-Macy's in 2003. On March 6, 2005, the Bon-Macy's name was eliminated, with the stores renamed as the Macy's Northwest division of Federated. On February 6, 2008, the Macy's Northwest division was merged with the Macy's West division, based in San Francisco.

== History ==
=== Origins and establishment ===
An older Bon Marché logo

The Bon Marché was founded in 1890 by Edward and Josephine Nordhoff, who had moved to Seattle from Chicago. Edward Nordhoff was a German immigrant who had worked for the Louvre Department Store in Paris, which competed with the Maison of Aristide Boucicaut "Au Bon Marché" (now part of the LVMH group). Nordhoff moved to Chicago in 1881 and managed a department store in Chicago where he met his wife Josephine, who was a clerk 13 years his junior.

The Nordhoffs leased a small storefront in modern-day Belltown at 1st Avenue and Cedar Street that cost $25 per month. They invested their entire savings account into merchandise for the store and worked to attract customers away from the city's main retail district. Josephine Nordhoff stocked shelves, kept the books, and cleaned the store; she later learned Chinook Jargon to wait on Native American customers. To keep customers during the economic panic of the early 1890s, the Nordhoffs stocked sacks of pennies to provide small discounts. The growing success of the store allowed the Nordhoffs to relocate closer to the business district in 1896, leasing an L-shaped building at 2nd Avenue and Pike Street.

In 1899, at age 40, Edward died of an illness his doctor called phthisis, probably tuberculosis (Phthisis pulmonalis). Josephine remarried two years later. Her new husband, Frank McDermott, joined her and Rudolph Nordhoff, Edward's brother, in operating The Bon Marché. The store entered a period of rapid growth under the management of this trio. Sales increased from $338,000 in 1900 to $8 million in 1923. The store was enlarged twice at its Second and Pike location, in 1902 and 1911.

=== Acquisition by Allied and expansion ===
In 1929, The Bon Marché opened at Third and Pine. That year, the store was sold to Hahn Stores of Chicago, which was acquired by Allied Stores five years later. Both corporations continued to operate the store under its original name. In 1937, The Bon Marché opened its first store outside of Washington through a merger of Boise, Idaho-based C.C. Anderson's into The Bon Marché by Allied Stores. The downtown Boise store remained in operation for more than 70 years, until early 2010, albeit as a Macy's for its final few years. The Bon began opening additional stores after World War II. In 1949, it provided the anchor store for one of the world's first modern shopping centers, at Northgate Mall.

In 1978, the company gained nine stores, including rebranding the Allied-owned Missoula Mercantile of Missoula, Montana to Bon-Marché. The Missoula store closed as Macy's in 2010.

By 1986, when Campeau Corporation acquired Allied Stores, the Bon Marché was one of the best-known retailers in the Northwest, with about 40 stores throughout the region.

The Bon also opened and operated three stores in Utah: The largest one was in Ogden, at the Ogden City Mall. The second was in Layton Hills Mall in Layton, a bedroom community north of Salt Lake City. Third was the smallest store in the entire chain - Logan. This store was located in the Cache Valley Mall. The stores in Ogden and Logan were sold to Lamonts department stores in 1988 because they weren't performing well for the company. Layton's location remained open until 1993, when it was sold to J.C. Penney.

=== Acquisition by Federated and conversion to Macy's ===
Bon-Macy's logo used from 2003 to 2005

After yet another change in corporate ownership in 1992, the Bon ended up in the hands of Federated Department Stores, a Cincinnati-based company which also owns the Macy's and Bloomingdales chains. In 2001, The Bon Marché debuted a prototype store in Helena, Montana. The 65,000-square-foot (6,000 m^{2}) store featured everything a typical Bon Marché had plus centralized checkouts.

In August 2003, Federated rebranded The Bon Marché, turning it into Bon-Macy's. Federated also tacked Macy's onto the names of four other regional chains under its umbrella (Burdines in Florida, Lazarus in the Midwest, Goldsmith's in Tennessee, and Rich's in the Southeast). Customers had about a year to get used to that change when, in September 2004, Federated announced that all its regional chains would be renamed Macy's.

As of 2004, Bon-Macy's consisted of 50 stores in Washington, Oregon, Idaho, Montana, and Wyoming. New store signs, reading simply Macy's, were in place by January 2005. The former flagship store in downtown Seattle retains one small, original example of The Bon Marché signage; this can be seen above the north entrance of the store, at the corner of 4th Ave & Olive Way.

On February 6, 2008, Federated's chairman, president, and chief executive officer, Terry Lundgren announced the localization strategy and the company's plan to shed 2,550 jobs. This included laying off the Macy's Northwest headquarters and merging all of the former The Bon Marché stores under the Macy's West division.

== Brand identity ==
Beginning in the 1990s, The Bon Marché used an advertising jingle for its "One Day Sale" based on the song "Day-O" by Harry Belafonte. It was used in television and radio commercials into the 2000s and later entered local pop culture. "Day-o, One Day Sale, One day only at The Bon Marché! Save 20, 30, 40 percent (example savings)! Saturday only at the Bon Marche. Prices are down in every department! Saturday only at the Bon Marche!..." In the 1960s, it also used some cuts from PAMS' Series 23 jingle package, "Ani-Magic".

== Gallery ==
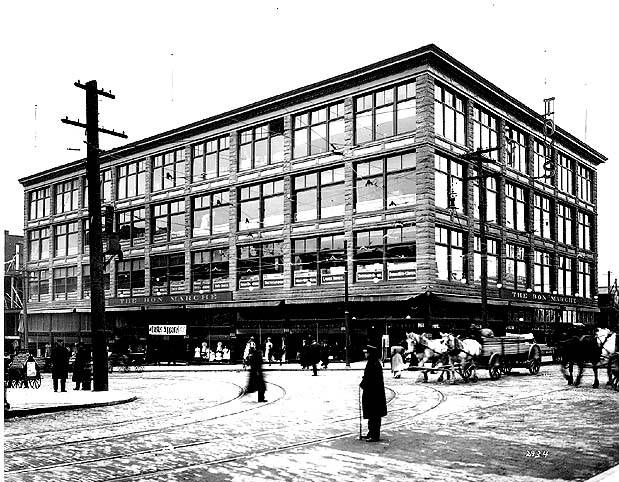
The 1902 Bon Marché pictured in 1907

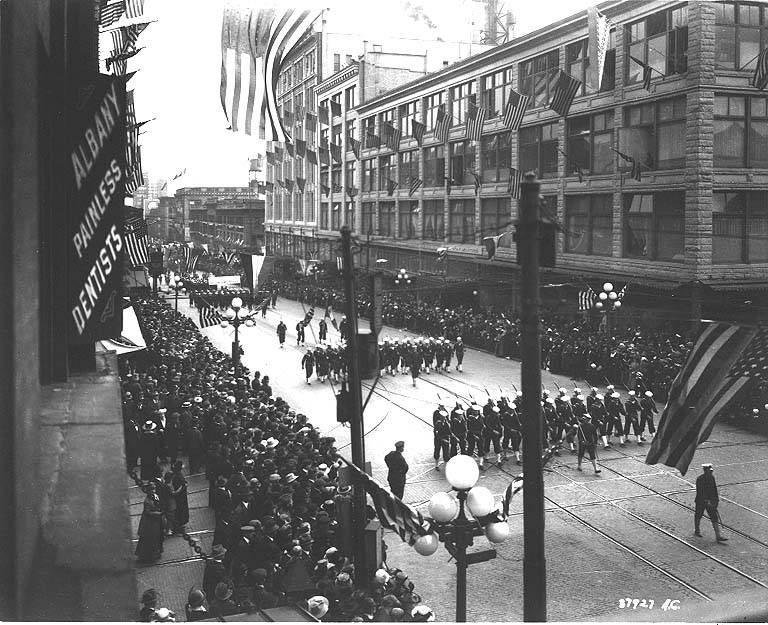
Bon Marché store pictured in 1919, with the 1911 addition to the south.

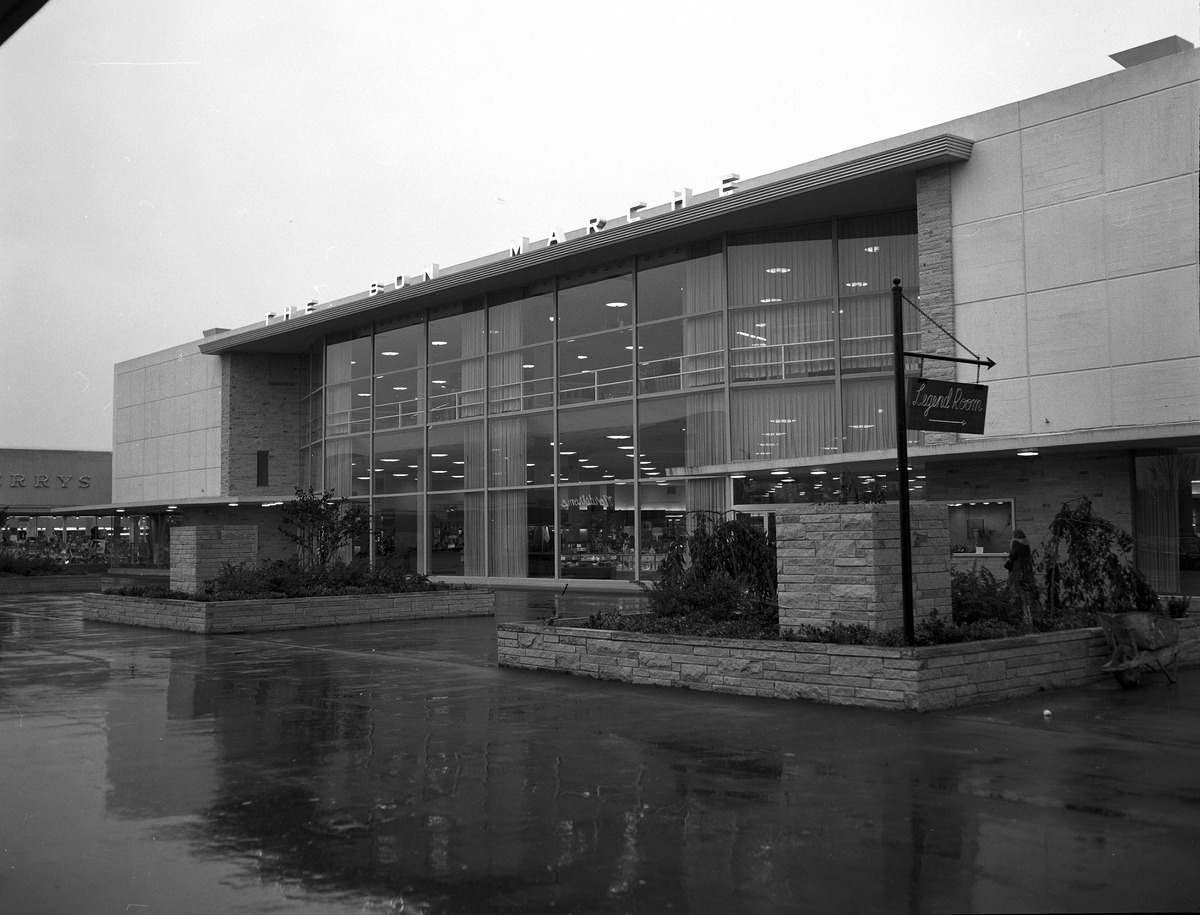
Suburban store at Northgate Mall in Seattle, 1950

== See also ==
- List of department stores converted to Macy's
- List of defunct department stores of the United States
