= Herpolsheimer's =

American department store in Michigan

Coordinates: 42°57′49.2″N 85°40′07.5″W

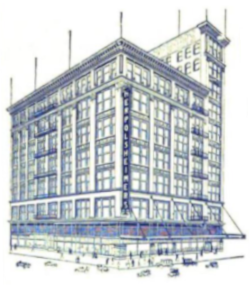
- Illustration of the downtown Grand Rapids store from a 1921 ad
- Type: Subsidiary
- Industry: Department store
- Predecessor: Voight Herpolshiemer & Co.
- Founded: 1865; 161 years ago in Michigan City, Indiana, United States
- Founders: William G. Herpolsheimer; Charles G. A. Voigt
- Defunct: September 8, 1990
- Fate: Purchased by Federated Department Stores
- Headquarters: Grand Rapids, Michigan, United States
- Number of locations: 4 (2 Grand Rapids area, 1 Muskegon, 1 Battle Creek)
- Areas served: Grand Rapids, Muskegon and Battle Creek
- Parent: Hahn's Department Stores (1928–1935); Allied Stores (1935–1987); Federated Department Stores (1987–1990)

Herpolsheimer's was a department store company headquartered in Grand Rapids, Michigan.

== History ==
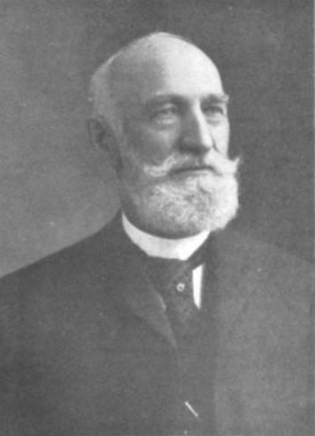
William G. Herpolsheimer (1842–1920)

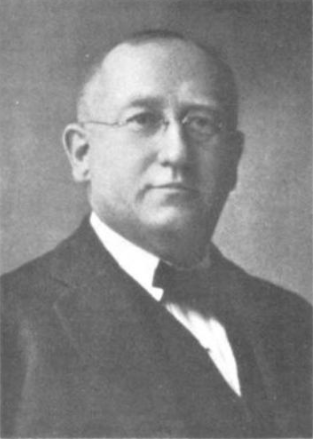
Henry B. Herpolsheimer (1868–1920)

At the end of the Civil War in 1865, Prussian-American businessman and Union Army veteran Mike Cox Herpolsheimer co-founded the dry goods business Voight, Herpolsheimer & Co. in Michigan City, Indiana, in partnership with Charles G. A. Voigt. In 1870, he opened a second store in Grand Rapids. He handed over management of the business to his son Henry C. Herpolsheimer in 1902.

In 1928, the store was acquired by Hahn's Department Stores, a holding company which later morphed into the Allied Stores conglomerate in 1935. In 1933, the Hahn's group would also acquire L.H. Field & Co. of Jackson, Michigan, with the Jackson "Field's" stores becoming a sister operation to the Herpolsheimer's store in Grand Rapids. (In later years, advertisements would note customers could use their "Herpolsheimer's/Field's Credit Cards" at locations of either store.)

After suffering a fire almost three years prior and following subsequent litigation between the parties, the William D. Hardy Company of Muskegon, operating Hardy's Department Store, agreed in 1947 to merge its operations with a newly opened Herpolsheimer's branch location in Muskegon and proceed as Hardy-Herpolsheimer's. A brand new building for the flagship downtown Grand Rapids location was constructed and opened in 1949 at the northwest corner of Fulton Street and Division Avenue, also fronting on Monroe Street, on which its former store was located two blocks to the west. The former location was sold to local competitor Wurzburg's. In a departure from the traditional department store format, Herpolsheimer's opened location selling only furniture, appliances, televisions and limited hardware in the Tower Building at River Avenue and 8th Street in downtown Holland in October 1948. It operated until at least 1955 before closing. The first suburban full-line department store outlet for the growing chain was acquired from Wurzburg's in Wyoming in 1974 and the Hardy-Herpolsheimer's in Muskegon was later assumed into the Muskegon Mall development in 1976. With the opening of the Southland store in suburban Wyoming in 1974, the store officially rebranded themselves as "Herp's," which is how they had been colloquially referred to for many years, including a new logo. In 1981, L.W. Robinson, an old-line department store in downtown Battle Creek, was purchased and rebranded as Herp's.

Various Herpolsheimer's logos

Starting in 1985, the downtown Grand Rapids store was reduced in size, with the remainder being converted to a shopping mall called City Centre. With the City Centre "grand re-opening," Herpolsheimer's officially reverted to its full name, giving up on the shortened "Herp's" version from eleven years prior. The full Herpolsheimer's name was restored to the downtown Grand Rapids, Wyoming, Muskegon, and Battle Creek stores. In 1987, the two Herpolsheimer's stores in the Grand Rapids area, were merged into Allied Stores' Indianapolis-based William H. Block unit and were sold to Federated Department Stores. At that same time, the downtown Battle Creek and Muskegon stores were sold to separate local groups of investors—the Battle Creek location reverted to its former "Robinson's" name while the Muskegon store returned to its "Hardy's" moniker, while the three L.H. Field & Co. (Field's) stores in Jackson were shuttered. Later in November of that year, the two remaining Herpolsheimer's stores, now under Federated ownership, adopted the Lazarus name. As part of Federated's bankruptcy proceedings after having been purchased, ironically, by Allied—the entity that had spun off Herpolsheimer's to Federated in the first place in 1987—the Lazarus division announced it would shutter the two Grand Rapids area stores in the City Centre and Wyoming Village (Southland), on September 8, 1990. Thus ended 120 years of retailing, 117 years with the Herpolsheimer name and the final three as Lazarus. The City Centre itself would finally close at the end of July, 1993 after most of its shops closed.

During the pre-Christmas shopping period, Herpolsheimer's operated the "Santa Express" miniature train on a monorail suspended from the ceiling of the basement in its downtown Grand Rapids store. When in operation as the City Centre mall, the space below the train served as a food-court and the train was run year-round, painted in a non-seasonal livery. The train is now located at the Grand Rapids Public Museum.

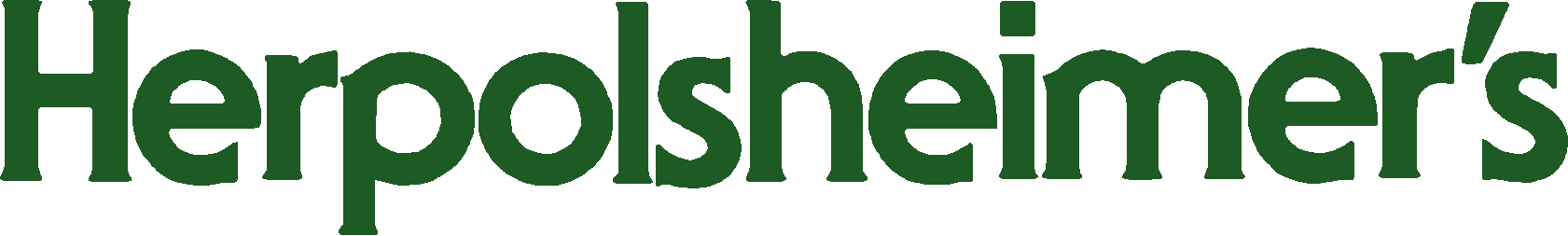
Herpolsheimer's Department Store Final Logo

== In popular culture ==
Herpolsheimer's was also featured in the 2004 film The Polar Express. The boy had a picture from Herpolsheimer's of himself ripping the fake beard off the store's Santa Claus. Later, as the boy is riding the train to the North Pole, the know-it-all exclaims "Hey, look everybody, Herpolsheimer's! Herpolsheimer's!" as the train passes the store in what is presumably downtown Grand Rapids. The children aboard the train admire the store's window displays as they pass, with the boy smirking at an obviously animatronic Santa placing presents in one display.

Herpolsheimer's produced a series of advertising cards in 1921 which featured pictures of notable baseball players of the time. Long thought to be legendary, a trove of cards was discovered housed in a Band-Aid box in a 2019 estate sale. The cards came to auction in 2023. The Babe Ruth card realized over $154,000. 37 other cards sold for as much as $3,400.

== Notable employees ==
- Betty Ford, former fashion coordinator
- Scott Haraburda, former department store Santa

William H Coleman, shoe department

== See also ==
- List of defunct department stores of the United States
