= Allied Stores =

Parent company of American department store chains

Allied Stores Corporation
- Traded as: NYSE: ALL
- Industry: Department store
- Founded: 1930s
- Founder: B. E. Puckett
- Defunct: 1992; 34 years ago
- Fate: Merged with Federated Department Stores
- Headquarters: New York City, United States
- Area served: United States

Allied Stores Corporation was an American holding company of department store chains based in New York City. It was founded in the 1930s during a period of consolidation in the retail sector by B. E. Puckett. See also Associated Dry Goods. It was the successor to Hahn's Department Stores, a holding company founded in 1928.

In 1981, Allied Stores acquired the 24-year-old retail conglomerate Garfinckel, Brooks Brothers, Miller & Rhoads, Inc. for $228 million (~$664 million in 2024). The acquisition included 178 department stores and 48 specialty shops across 28 states.

In December 1986, Allied Stores was acquired by Campeau Corporation under Canadian entrepreneur Robert Campeau. In April 1988, Campeau merged with Federated Department Stores. Allied and Federated were consolidated in January 1990 after Chapter 11 bankruptcy, although they continued to operate as two distinct companies with their separate portfolios. Federated absorbed Allied when emerging from bankruptcy in February 1992.

== Stores ==
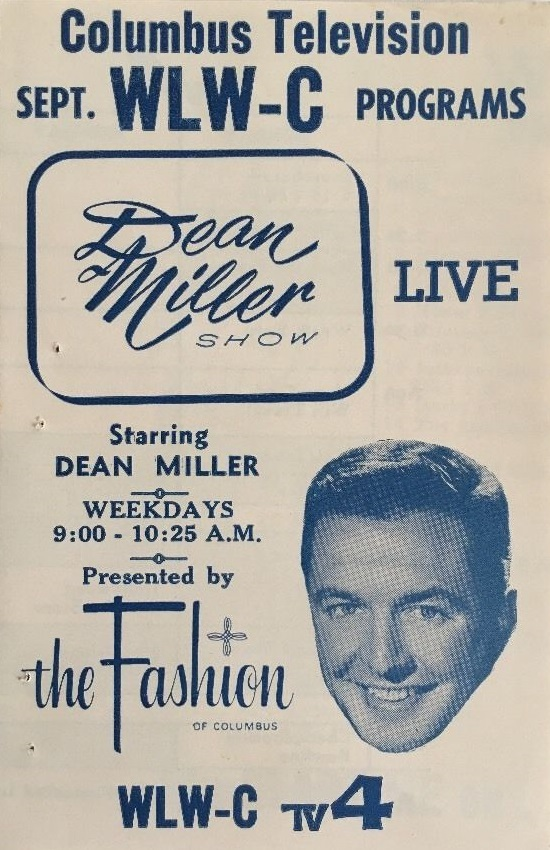
Advertisement for The Dean Miller Show on WLW-C, now WCMH, in Columbus, Ohio, sponsored by The Fashion

=== Department stores divisions at time of Campeau buyout ===
- Jordan Marsh founded in 1841, acquired by Hahn's in 1928, retained by Campeau. Merged with Federated's Abraham & Straus in 1992 becoming A&S/Jordan Marsh. Merged into Macy's East division in 1994 and renamed Macy's in 1996.
- Jordan Marsh Florida (offshoot of the New England chain) founded in 1956, consolidated with Maas Brothers in 1987.
- William H. Block, Indianapolis, Indiana, acquired by Allied 1962, sold to Federated in 1987 prior to merger; Several stores became F&R Lazarus & Co. locations, others were sold or closed.
- The Bon Marché of Seattle, Washington, founded 1890, acquired by Hahn's in 1927, retained by Campeau. Renamed Bon-Macy's in 2003 and changed to Macy's in 2005
- Cain Sloan, Nashville, Tennessee, acquired by Dillard's 1987.
- Dey Brothers, Syracuse, New York, sold to Wilfree Property 1987.
- Donaldson's of Minneapolis, Minnesota, was founded in 1883 and acquired by Allied Stores Corp. in 1928. Later acquired Powers Dry Goods, it was sold to Carson Pirie Scott in 1987.
- Herpolsheimer's, Grand Rapids, Michigan, sold along with the William H. Block stores to Federated in 1987 (prior to merger); Stores briefly became Lazarus stores and later closed.
- Heer's, Springfield, Missouri
- Joske's of San Antonio, Texas, taken over 1932, after 1987 acquired by Dillard's after Allied merged with Federated.
- Maas Brothers, Tampa, Florida, founded in 1886, acquired by Hahn's in 1929, retained by Campeau. Consolidated with Jordan Marsh Florida in 1987. Renamed Maas Brothers/Jordan Marsh in 1989. Merged into Burdines in 1991.
- Miller & Rhoads, Richmond, Virginia
- Miller's, Johnson City, Kingsport, Chattanooga, and Knoxville, Tennessee; Bristol, Virginia – sold to Hess's 1987
- Pomeroy's, Reading, Harrisburg, Wilkes-Barre, and Levittown, Pennsylvania, Willingboro, New Jersey, Acquired by Hahn's on 9/18/1934, sold to The Bon-Ton in 1987
- Read's Department Stores, Bridgeport, Connecticut, merged into Jordan Marsh 1987
- Stern's (Stern Brothers) of New Jersey was acquired by Allied in 1951. Division closed in 2001 and most stores converted to Macy's or Bloomingdales.
- L.H. Field & Co. (Field's) Jackson, Michigan, established in 1891, became part of Allied Stores in 1933. Field's was successful for many years with three local stores. With Allied, Field's was a sister store to Herpolsheimer's (Herp's) in Grand Rapids, Michigan. Also, L.H. Field was a cousin of Marshall Field, who established the famed department store in Chicago, IL in 1881. Allied was acquired by Campeau Corporation of Toronto, Ontario, in 1986. Campeau announced the closure of all Field's unit stores December 24, 1986, and the store was officially closed May 23, 1987.

=== Specialty stores divisions at time of Campeau buyout ===
- Ann Taylor, New York City, initially retained by Campeau, sold off in 1989
- Bonwit Teller, New York, acquired 1979, sold to Hooker Corporation in 1987
- Brooks Brothers, New York, initially retained by Campeau, sold in 1988 to Marks & Spencer of London, acquired by Retail Brand Alliance in 2001
- Catherine's, Memphis and Nashville, Tennessee, and Los Angeles, California
- Jerry Leonard.
- Garfinckels, Washington, D.C., sold to Raleigh's 1987
- Plymouth, New York, sold to Tribeca Holdings 1987. By the mid-1990s the chain was closed

=== Other stores ===
- Almart, Discount department store operating in Florida, Tennessee, Kentucky, Virginia, Delaware, Pennsylvania, Ohio, and New York
- Barnes – Woodin, Yakima, Washington, Merged with Draper's in 1953, eventually became the Bon Marché
- James Black Company (also known as Black's), Waterloo, Iowa, Three locations, downtown Waterloo, Crossroads Mall and College Hills Mall in Cedar Falls, Iowa. Transferred to Donaldson's in 1978 and name change. Downtown store closed July 3, 1981, as Donaldson's. Two mall locations operated as Donaldson's then Carson Pirie Scott until 1989.
- Gertz, Jamaica, New York, merged into Stern's
- Golden Rule, St. Paul, Minnesota, acquired by Hahn's in 1928, became Donaldson's Golden Rule, eventually fully merged into Donaldson's
- C. C. Anderson's, Boise, Idaho, acquired by Allied in 1937, eventually part of Bon Marché
- A. M. Jensen's, Walla Walla, Washington, acquired by Allied in 1946, became the Bon Marché in 1951
- Laubach's, Easton, Pennsylvania, acquired 1947 and merged into Pomeroy's and closed in the 1970s
- Levy's, Savannah, Georgia, merged into Maas Brothers, February 1986.
- Rollman & Sons, Cincinnati three stores merged into Mabley & Carew, 1962.
- Rumbaugh-MacLain of Everett, Washington, in 1944, acquired and merged into The Bon Marché. Southwest corner of Wetmore and California Streets. Designed by Portland, Oregon architects Doyle & Merriam, specialists in larger store buildings. Opened just six months before the Wall Street Crash (1929) that began the Great Depression.
- Titche-Goettinger of Dallas, Texas, later name changed to Joske's, Dallas
- Wren's, Springfield, Ohio, merged into Block's
- Quackenbush, Paterson, New Jersey merged with Stern's in late 1960s.
- Troutman's, eight locations in Western Pennsylvania: Butler, Connellsville, Greensburg – Downtown (Flagship Store), Greensburg – Westmoreland Mall (now The Bon-Ton), Indiana, Latrobe, New Castle, Washington Crown Center (now The Bon-Ton). Merged with Pomeroy's in 1984.
- Mabley & Carew, Cincinnati, Ohio. Acquired in 1960, absorbed Rollman & Sons in 1962. Stores sold to Elder-Beerman in 1978.
- Polsky's, Akron, Ohio; acquired by Allied in 1929, eventually expanded to four stores in Northern Ohio. This chain was shut down in December 1978, since Allied wanted to concentrate investment in their Southwest region stores.
- Harzfeld's, Kansas City, Missouri, acquired 1981, closed 1984
- Sterling-Lindner Co., Cleveland, Ohio; acquired Lindner & Davis Co. in 1947; merged with Sterling & Welch in 1950; closed in 1968.
- The Fashion (Columbus, Ohio), purchased by Allied Stores in 1949; later merged with Morehouse Martens to form Morehouse Fashion; Name later shortened to The Fashion. Closed in 1969; Space taken over by The Union department store and later Halle's.
- The Palace, Spokane, Washington, purchased from Kemp & Hebert stores in 1951, divested soon after.
- The Paris of Montana, Great Falls, Montana, acquired 1937, when owned by C. C. Anderson's, merged into The Bon Marché; The Bon closed the former location in 1999.
