= Millennium Tower (Boston) =

Skyscraper in Boston, Massachusetts

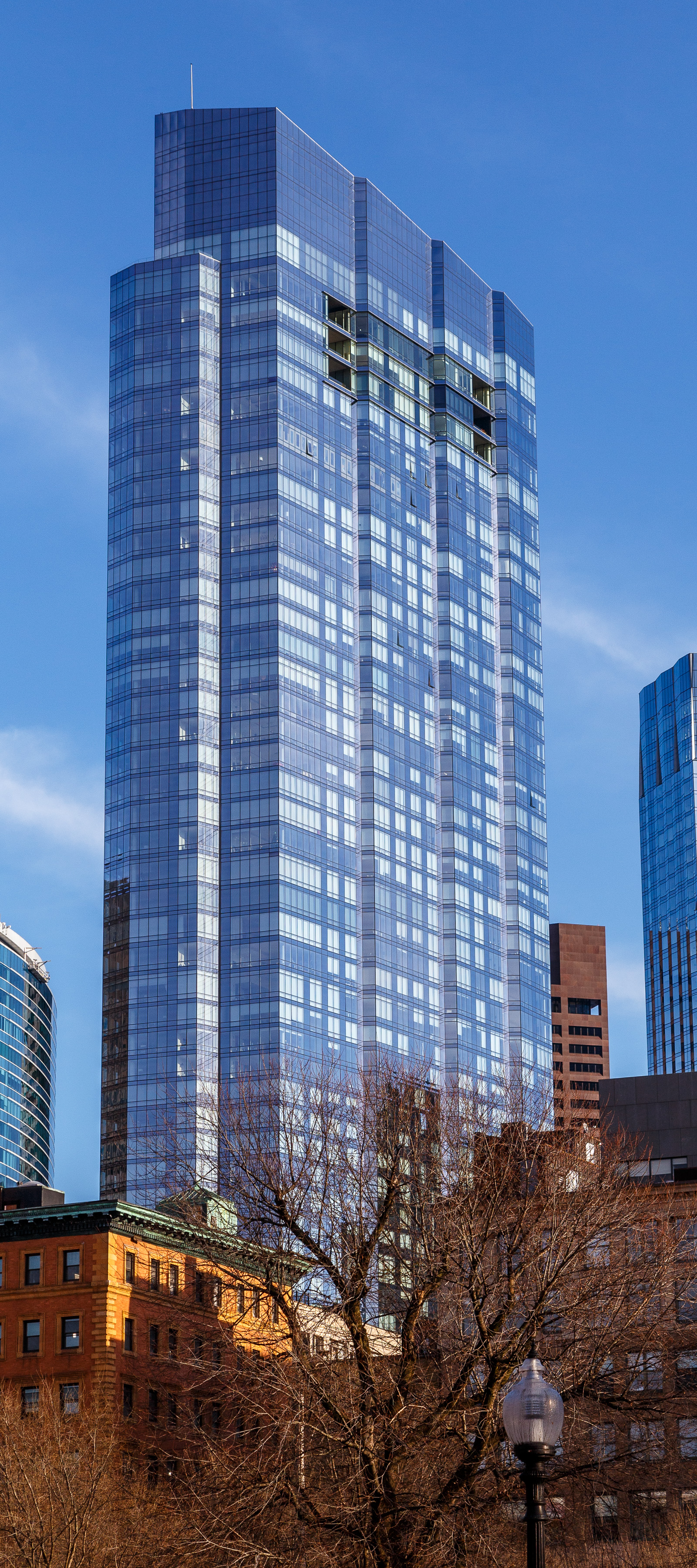
- Millennium Tower in 2024

- Location within Massachusetts

General information
- Status: Completed
- Type: Residential, Retail
- Location: 1 Franklin Street Boston, Massachusetts, US
- Coordinates: 42°21′21.01″N 71°3′33.91″W
- Construction started: September 17, 2013
- Completed: September 7, 2015
- Opened: June 1, 2016
- Cost: US$375 million ($503 million in 2025 dollars)

Height
- Roof: 684 ft (208 m)

Technical details
- Floor count: 60
- Floor area: 1,100,000 sq ft (100,000 m^{2})

Design and construction
- Architect: Blake Middleton of Handel Architects
- Developer: Millennium Partners
- Structural engineer: DeSimone Consulting Engineers

Millennium Tower is a 60-story, 684-foot-tall (208 m) residential skyscraper in Boston, Massachusetts, United States. Construction began in 2013 at the site of the former flagship store for Filene's in Downtown Crossing and was completed in 2016. As of 2022, it is the fifth tallest building in Boston. The building contains 442 condominiums, a Roche Bros. grocery store and Class A office space. Limited occupancy by residents began in July 2016.

== History ==
=== Initial plans, demolition, and project halt ===
Millennium Tower and the Burnham Building occupy the space of the former flagship Filene's store. When Filene's closed, the building was put up for sale and was bought by Vornado Realty Trust of New York. Vornado teamed up with Gale International for a $700 million redevelopment of the Filene's site.

As approved in August 2007, the site redevelopment project consisted of a 39-story tower including a 280-room hotel, a 125-seat restaurant, 475,000 square feet (44,100 m^{2}) of office space, 166 residential condos, 300,000 square feet (28,000 m^{2}) of retail space, and an adjacent park. It was originally scheduled for completion by 2011. In order to gut the historic Filene's building and demolish an adjacent building, the project required closing Filene's Basement and the loss of 218 retail jobs.

In Summer of 2008, the developers halted the project, citing the 2008 financial crisis. As of the halt, demolition was nearly complete, leaving the Burnham building gutted and a large excavation where the non-landmarked parts of the former Filenes complex (built in the 1950s–1970s) had stood. The side of the Burnham building that was exposed by the nearby demolition was temporarily covered with a tarp. After two years of inactivity, the City of Boston revoked the developer's permits in November 2010.

=== Ownership change and construction start ===
In 2012, Millennium Partners took over the task and won approval for a 625-foot tower with 1.2 million square feet (110,000 m^{2}) of commercial and residential space in two buildings.

On April 13, 2013, major tenant Arnold Worldwide was signed to occupy a large part of the new building. With the agreement in place, construction resumed. The building officially broke ground on September 17, 2013 with mayor Thomas M. Menino in attendance. On April 26, 2014, 600 trucks poured 6,000 cubic yards (4,600 m^{3}) of concrete into a slab for the new building, making it the largest pour in the city's history.

=== Recent developments and tenants ===
Tenants, as of 2021, include Roche Bros supermarket.

According to an August 2016 article in the Boston Globe, luxury condos have been purchased by local residents as well buyers from Asia and Europe. A Millennium executive estimated at the time that 75% of the owners will be living in their units in Downtown Crossing.

== Gallery ==
The site before construction started in April, 2013. This is looking towards the 1911 built Burnham Building.

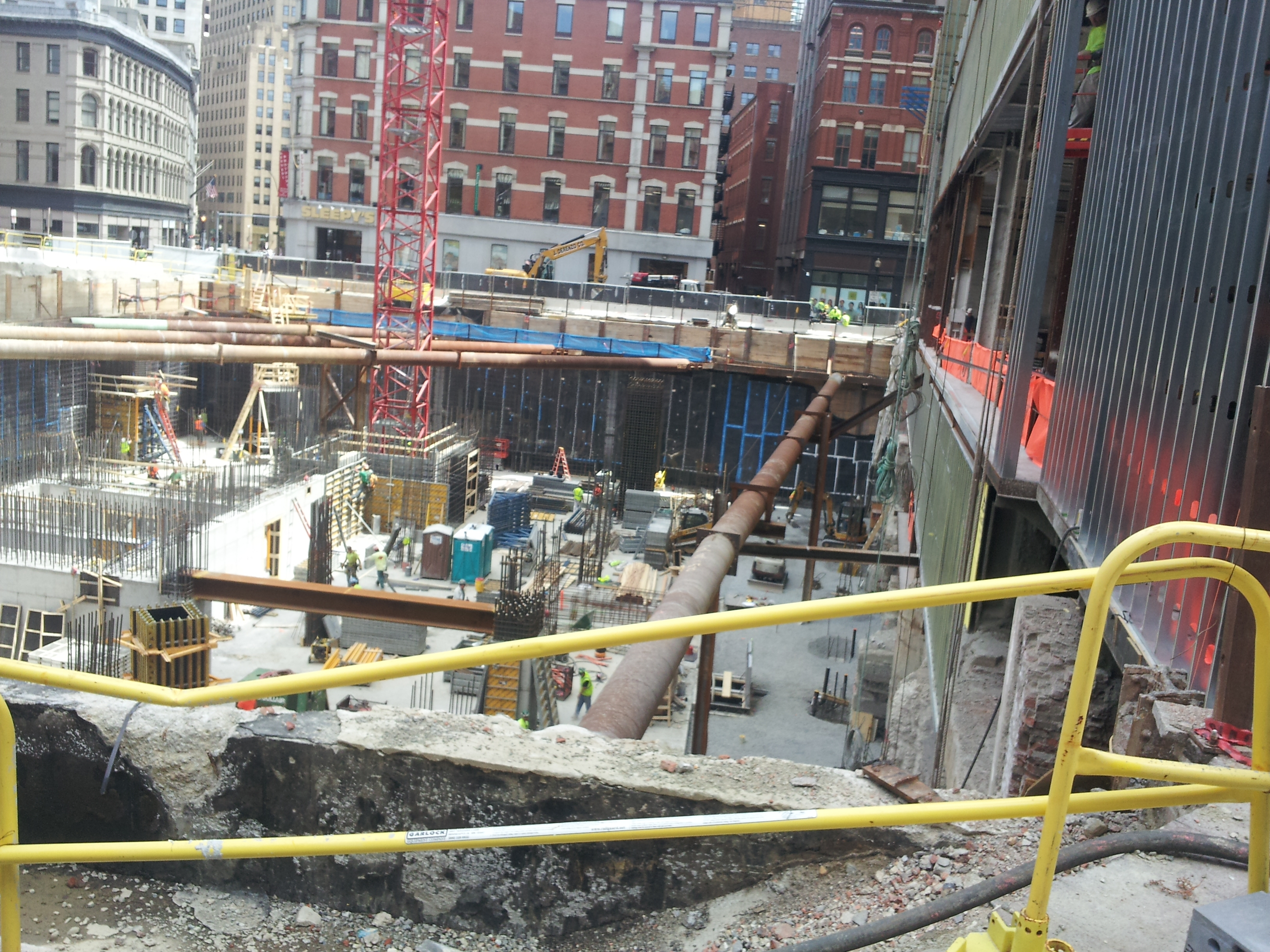
The Millennium Tower on May 2, 2014, with Filene's (Burnham Building) on the right

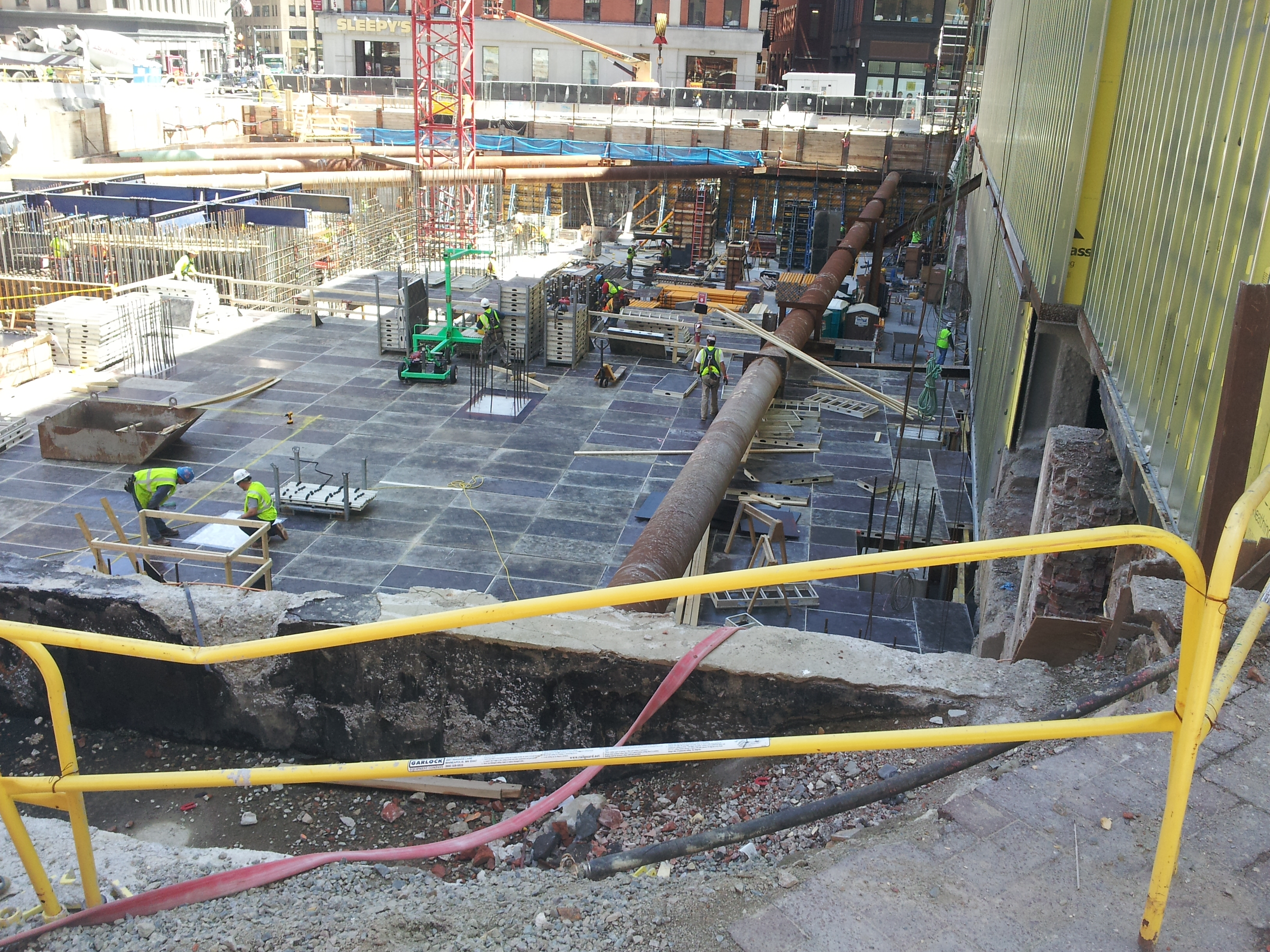
Construction of the Millennium Tower in late May 2014, almost at street level

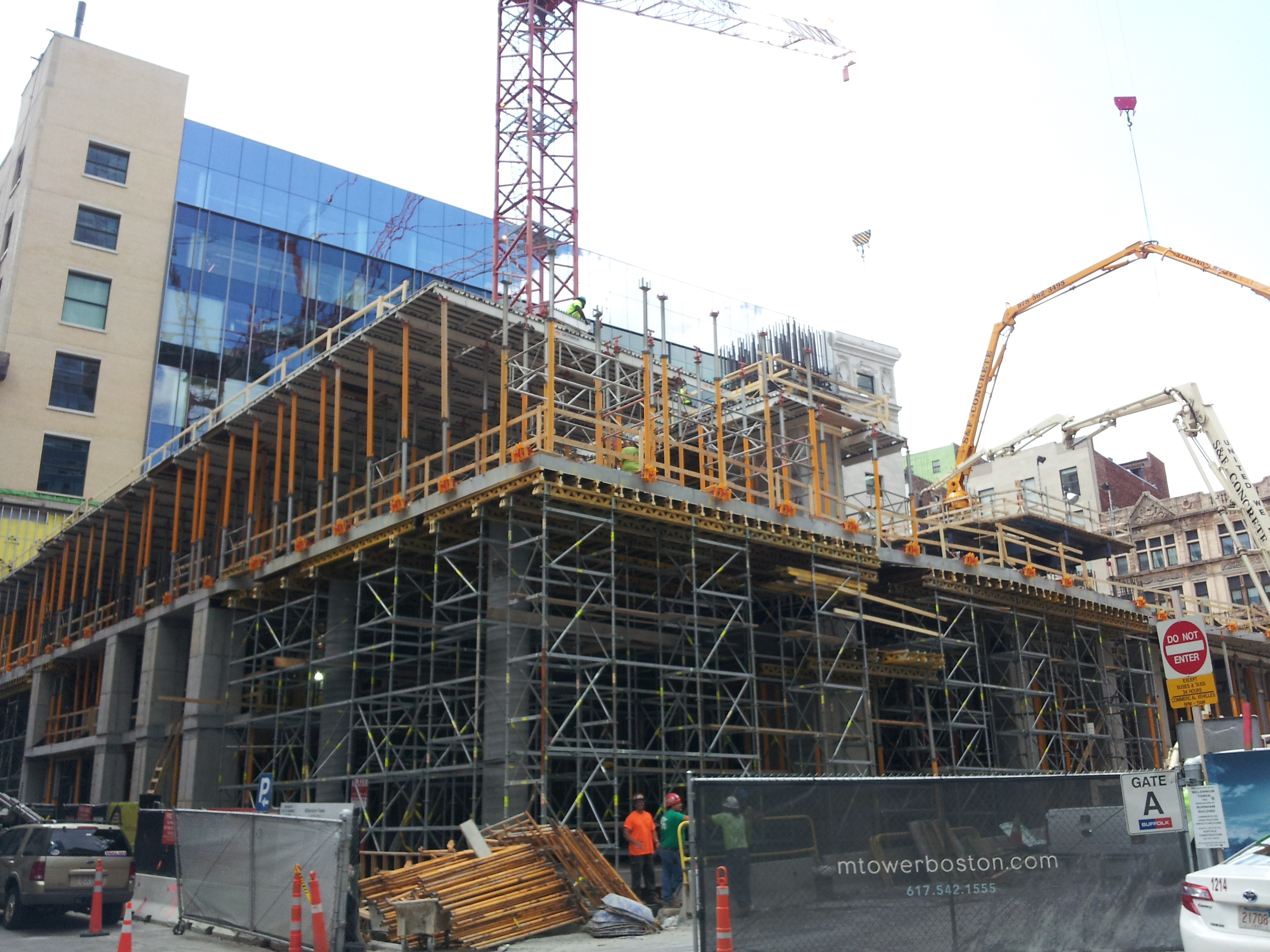
The tower in mid-August 2014. The first floor has been added, with the second on its way.

The tower on December 22, 2014 showing the first of the glass paneling.

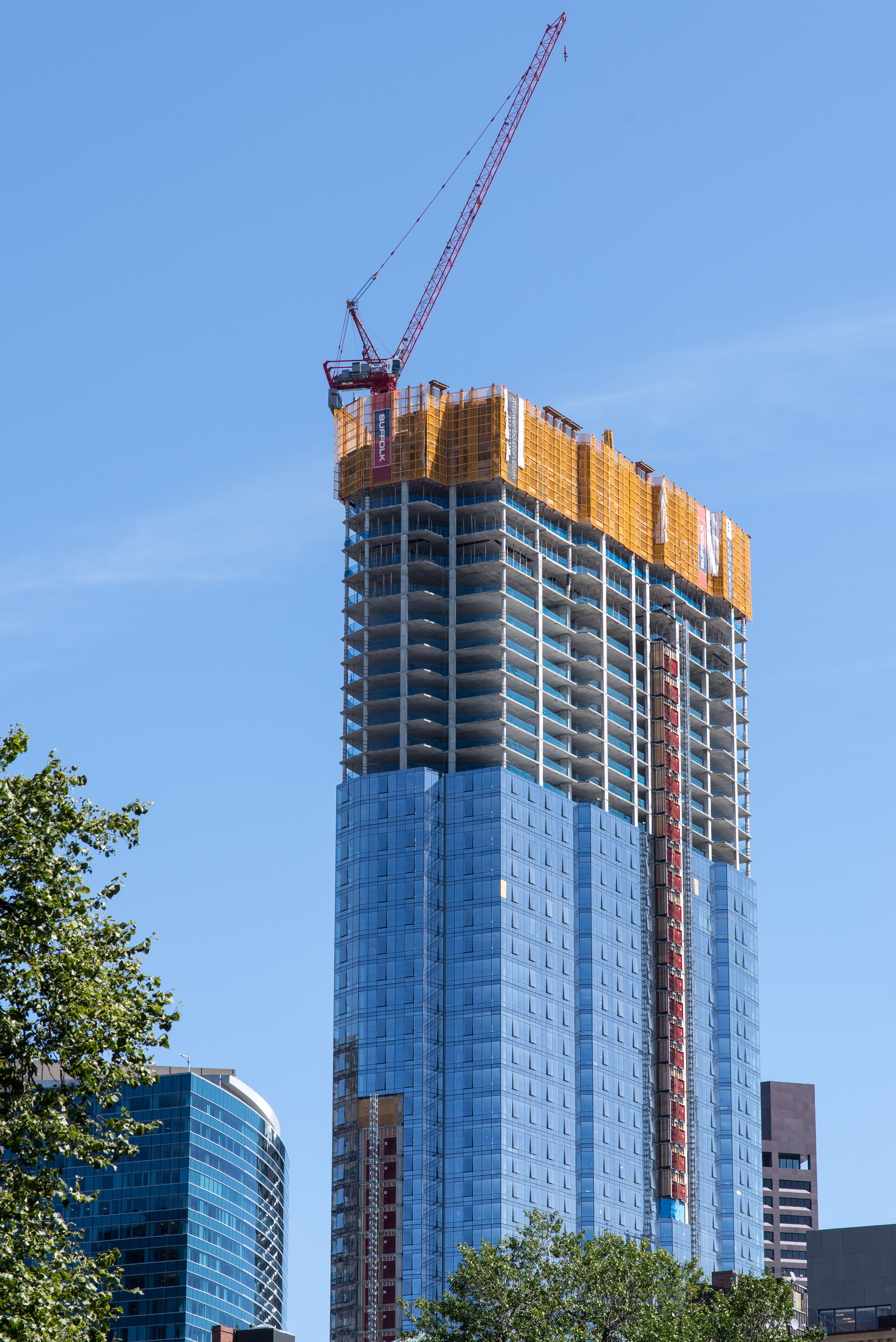
Construction in September 2015 showing concrete skeleton and curtain wall going up.

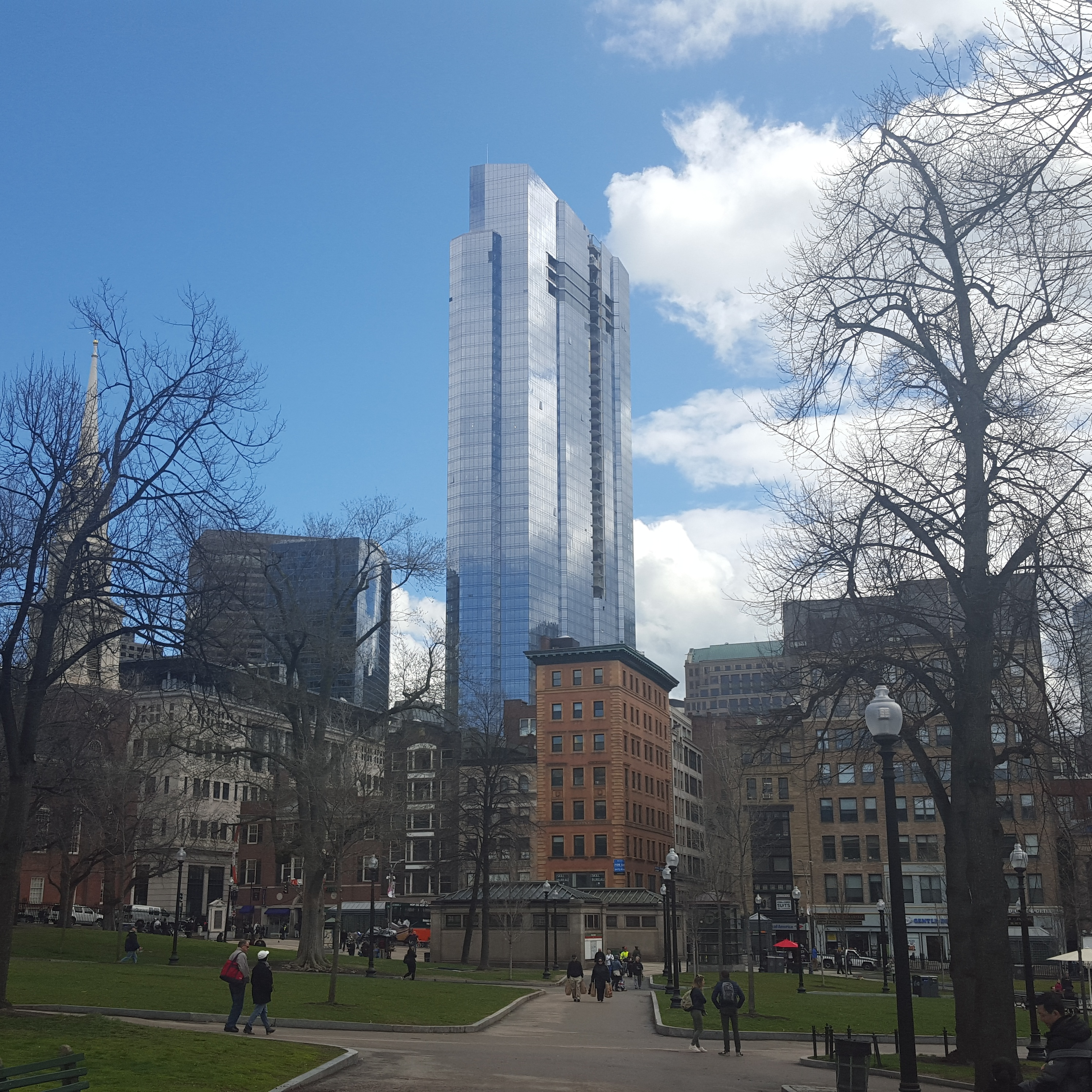
Millennium Tower on April 8, 2016. Cladding is almost complete.

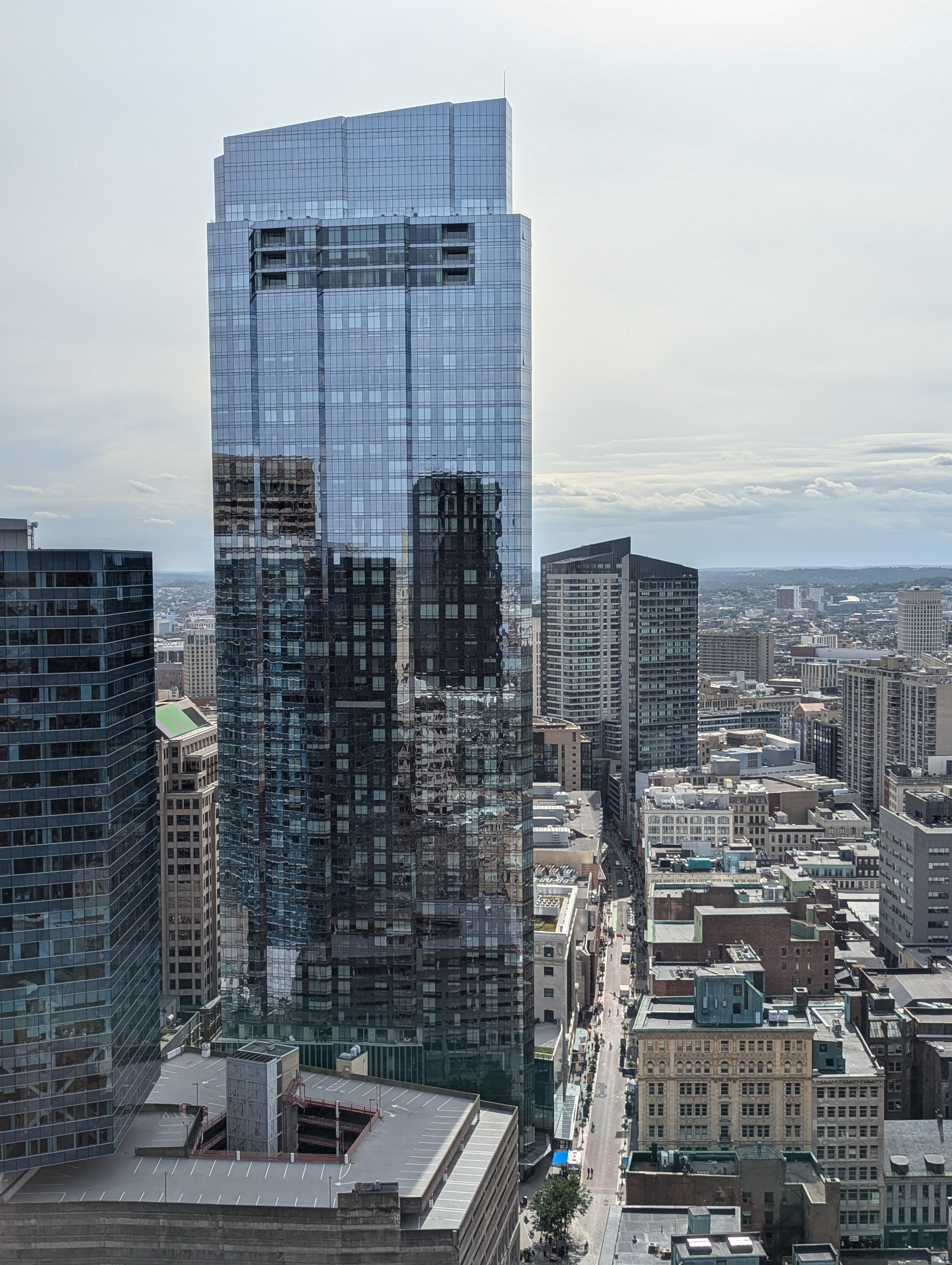
Millenium Tower looking south on Washington Street in September 2024.

== See also ==
- Filene's Department Store
- List of tallest buildings in Boston
