= Acquisition of The May Department Stores Company by Federated Department Stores =

2005 business transaction

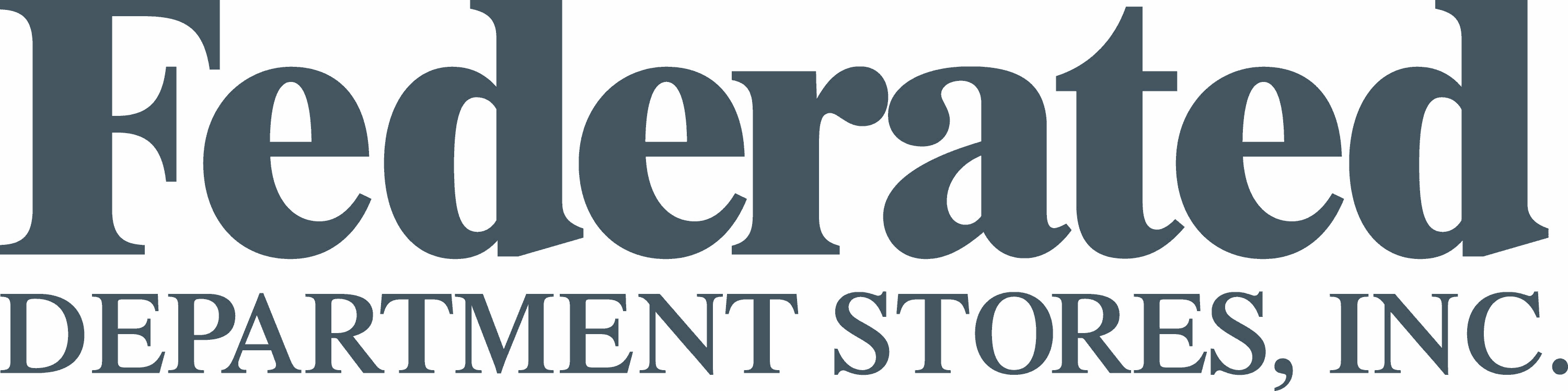

- Initiator: Federated Department Stores
- Target: The May Department Stores Company
- Type: Full acquisition
- Cost: US$11 billion
- Initiated: February 28, 2005; 21 years ago
- Completed: August 30, 2005; 21 years ago

The acquisition of The May Department Stores Company by Federated Department Stores was announced on February 28, 2005, and was completed on August 30, 2005. May-owned regional department stores throughout the United States were converted to Federated-owned Macy's and Bloomingdale's stores by September 9, 2006. At the time, the US$11 billion transaction was the largest retail transaction in the United States, and Federated became the third-largest general merchandise retailer in the country.

The acquisition introduced or expanded Macy's to new markets across the United States; Federated renamed itself Macy's, Inc. in 2007. It changed the composition of shopping malls nationwide, many of which had Federated and May brands for anchor stores and were left with multiple Macy's stores or vacancies. The transaction was criticized for replacing local heritage with a national brand, and received varying degrees of local opposition in affected markets. Several of the converted stores were permanently closed, and the scale of Macy's, Inc. was drastically reduced, as a result of the retail apocalypse in the 2010s.

== Background ==
Federated Department Stores, which acquired Bloomingdale's from the founding Bloomingdale family in 1930, acquired Macy's in 1994. For decades, the company maintained the individual brands of many regional department stores it acquired over the years. But in the 1990s, company leaders decided to consolidate brands: the Abraham & Straus and Jordan Marsh division was absorbed into Macy's East; Bullock's combined with Macy's into a new Macy's West; and Rich's and Goldsmith's combined with Lazarus. Some I. Magnin stores were converted to Macy's and Bloomingdale's while others were sold, and Broadway Stores and Jordan Marsh were converted to Macy's in the late 1990s. The conversions were intended to create operational efficiencies and buying power that resulted from operating a smaller number of brands.

Mergers and acquisitions of department stores to reduce expenses were commonplace by the 1950s, and even more frequent by the 1990s. By the early 2000s, department stores were lagging behind discount general merchandisers such as Walmart and Target and online shopping. In November 2004, Kmart acquired the Sears department stores to form Sears Holdings in a US$11 billion transaction. It was seen as the first major acquisition in a "new round of industry consolidation" to counter losses by department stores. May Department Stores hadn't experienced any sales growth in four years, had $6 billion of debt in 2005, and had previously attempted merging with Federated back in 2002.

== History ==
Federated and May were speculated to be in the early stages of acquisition discussions in January 2005. The companies ended discussions by February 15 after failing to agree upon a purchase price, however, it was reported that they arrived at a value of US$10 billion by February 25. It was officially announced that Federated would acquire May for US$11 billion (equivalent to US$17.7 billion in 2024) on February 28. The combined company would be the third-largest general merchandise retailer by total sales in the United States, behind Walmart and Sears Holdings. The credit card divisions of both companies were sold to Citigroup for US$4.5 billion to finance the transaction. Federated and May finalized the acquisition on August 30, 2005.

With the completion of the transaction, Federated confirmed that it would divest of 75 "duplicate" stores where Federated and May stores existed within the same shopping mall, of which seven were regulatory requirements:

- Filene's
  - Cape Cod Mall (Hyannis, Massachusetts)
- Lord & Taylor
  - South Shore Mall (Bay Shore, New York)
  - Walt Whitman Mall (Huntington Station, New York)
- Macy's
  - Fashion Island (Newport Beach, California)
  - Simi Valley Town Center (Simi Valley, California)
  - Westminster Mall (Westminster, California)
  - The Promenade men's and home store (Woodland Hills, California)

Then-Federated CEO Terry Lundgren stated with the announcement of the acquisition that the majority of the May-owned brands would be converted to Macy's or Bloomingdale's in the future. The fates of Marshall Field's and Lord & Taylor were not yet decided, and Lundgren acknowledged their high brand awareness. The final decision to convert all remaining May-owned department stores to Macy's and Bloomingdale's, Marshall Field's withstanding, was made public on September 5. However, Marshall Field's was ultimately included in the rebranding plans by September 20.

== Assets ==
At the time of the acquisition, Federated operated over 450 locations in 34 states, Guam, and Puerto Rico between the Bloomingdale's and Macy's brands. It had already co-branded previous acquisitions with the Macy's brand during "Project Hyphen" in 2003, including The Bon Marche (Bon–Macy's), Burdines (Burdines–Macy's), Goldsmith's (Goldsmith's–Macy's), Lazarus (Lazarus–Macy's), and Rich's (Rich's–Macy's), before fully converting them into Macy's in 2005. May operated over 500 properties between 12 regional department stores: Famous-Barr, Filene's, Foley's, Hecht's, The Jones Store, Kaufmann's, Lord & Taylor, L.S. Ayres, Marshall Field's, Meier & Frank, Robinsons-May, and Strawbridge's. It also operated nearly 700 specialty boutiques between the After Hours Formalwear, David's Bridal, and Priscilla of Boston brands. The two companies together operated over 1,000 stores and generated US$30 billion in yearly revenue.

== Aftermath ==
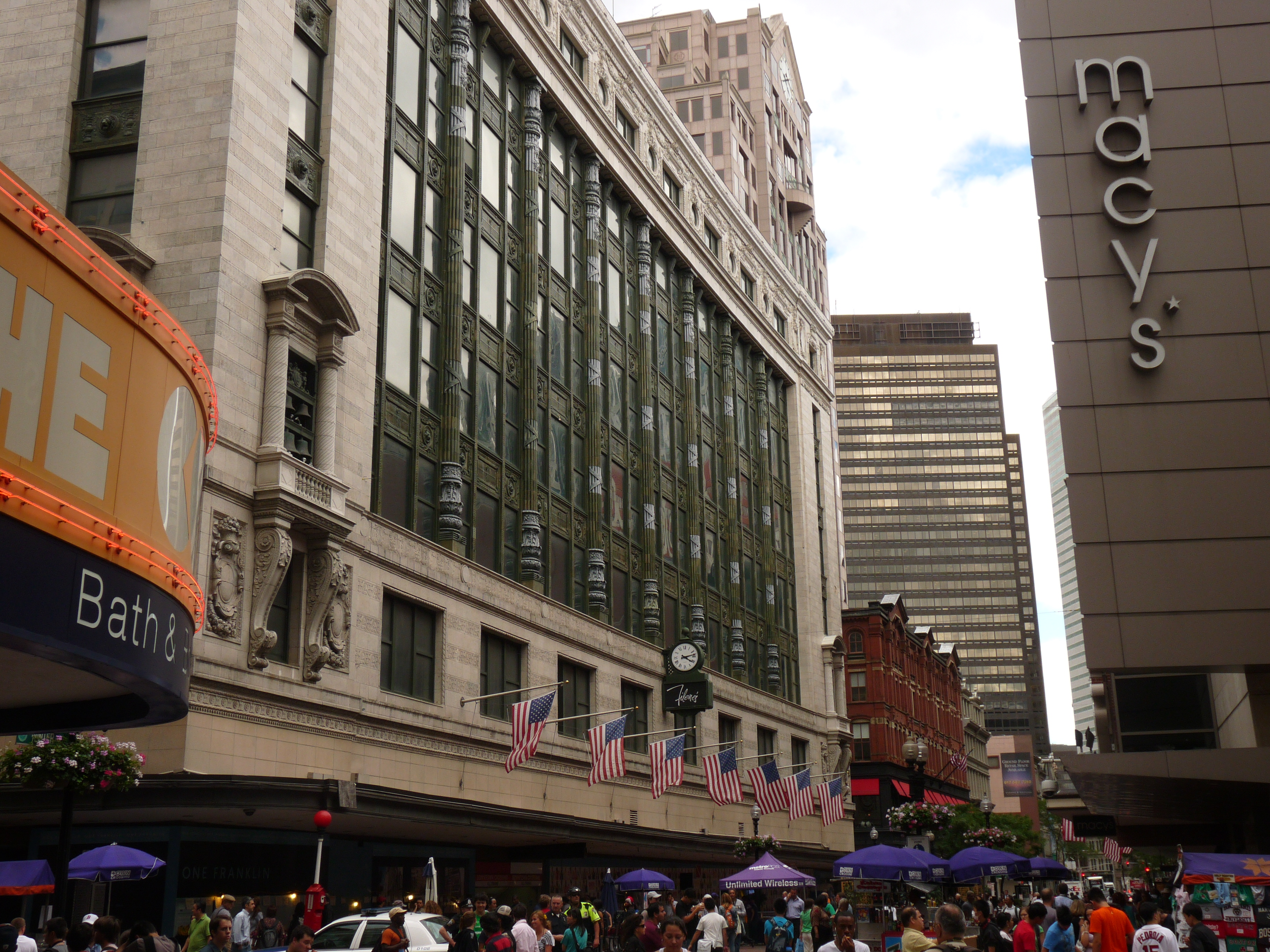
The former Filene's Department Store (left) and surviving Macy's store (right) in Downtown Crossing, Boston

On January 12, 2006, Federated announced plans to divest of the Lord & Taylor business, which consisted of 55 stores primarily located within the Northeastern United States, citing conflict with Macy's and Bloomingdale's expansions. Lord & Taylor was ultimately sold to NRDC Equity Partners for approximately US$1.2 billion that June. David's Bridal and Priscilla of Boston were sold to Leonard Green & Partners, and After Hours was sold to Men's Wearhouse, later that year.

Federated implemented new business divisions on February 1, 2006, consisting of Macy's East, Macy's Florida, Macy's Midwest, Macy's North, Macy's Northwest, Macy's South, and Macy's West. The Filene's/Kaufmann's, Foley's, Hecht's/Strawbridge's, and Robinsons-May/Meier & Frank divisions and the May corporate headquarters were subsequently dismantled. The existing Macy's in Downtown Crossing, Boston (itself converted from Jordan Marsh in 1996) was retained over the adjacent, flagship Filene's Department Store, which would be divested that year. On February 27, 2007, Federated announced plans to rename itself Macy's Group by June 1, stating that the company was no longer a "federation of department stores" but a "brand-driven company" where 90% of the revenue is generated from its namesake. The modified Macy's, Inc. name change and "M" ticker symbol went into effect on June 1.

The 2008 "My Macy's" business plan was introduced by the company to "ensure that each and every Macy's store is 'just right' for the customer who shops in that location", although analysts perceived that the company had "backpedaled" from the earlier homogenization. The company reduced to four business divisions (Macy's East absorbing Macy's North, Macy's West absorbing Macy's Northwest, and Macy's South absorbing Macy's Midwest) that February. The four divisions were combined into one, the first time the company had done so, in 2009. Bloomingdale's organizational structure remained intact through the reorganizations.

== Criticism ==
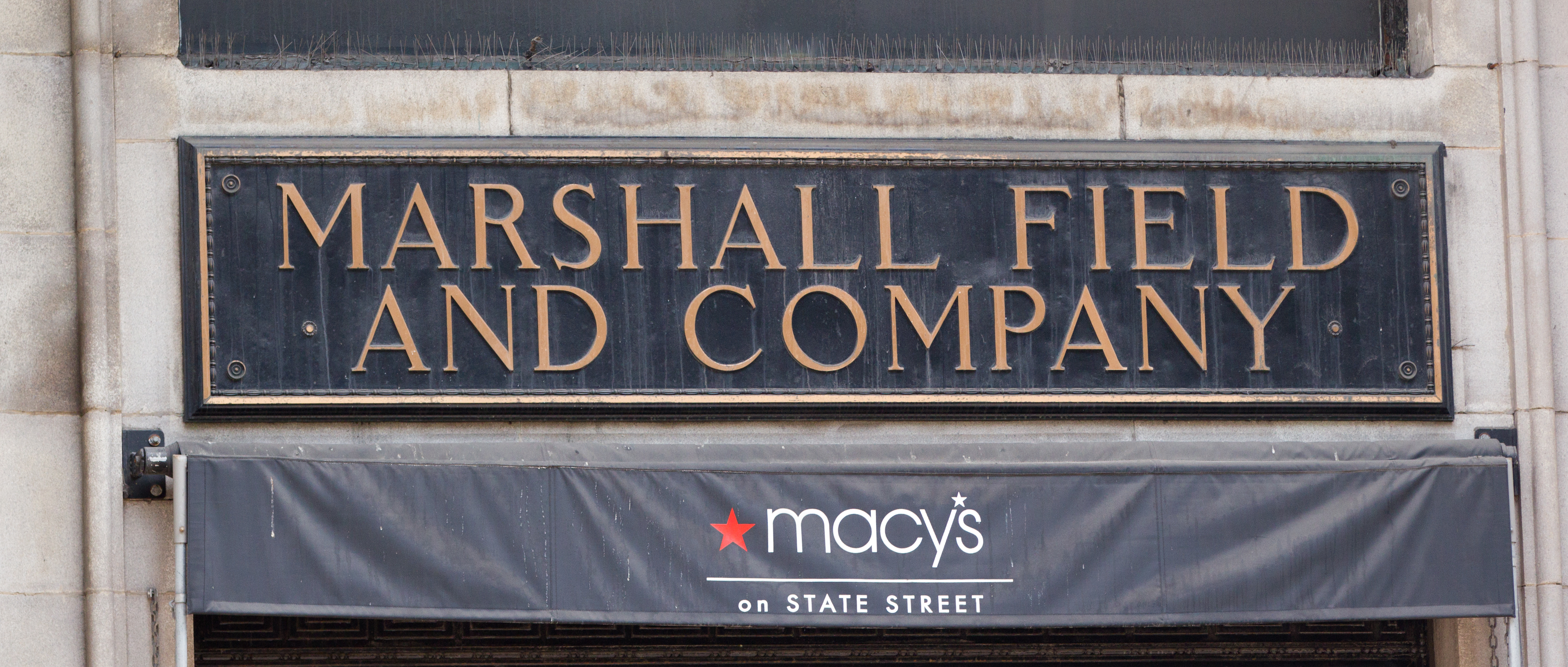
Original bronze plaque entrance sign on the Marshall Field and Company Building, and an awning for the present-day Macy's on State Street

Opposition to the Macy's brand, especially in former Filene's, Kaufmann's, and Marshall Field's markets, received media attention. Macy's was estimated to have lost 10–20 percent of former May customers between 2006 and 2007, citing an "arrogance" that came with prioritizing Macy's over established regional brands. Moreover, the first post-rebranding Macy's marketing campaign was described as "mundane" and ineffective in creating enthusiasm for the brand, especially in light of the loyalty lost with the others. Marylynne Pitz wrote in the Pittsburgh Post-Gazette that long-term residents continued to call the store Kaufmann's "even after its cluttered sales floors and spotty service made it unworthy of the name".

Protests were carried in front of the flagship Marshall Field and Company Building on September 10, 2006, in support of the outgoing Marshall Field's brand. The company refused to undo the rebranding, however, later acknowledged that many customers "just can't get over the Marshall Field's name change [...] no matter how hard we worked at it". Macy's consequently scaled back campaigns marketed toward former Marshall Field's customers, and directed its holiday 2007 campaign toward indifferent customers that lacked sentimentality to either brand. Lord & Taylor, divested by Federated by this time, enjoyed a 12-percent sales increase in the Chicago market following the Macy's rebranding. Grassroots campaigns for the flagship store to be taken over by the Selfridges department stores of the United Kingdom, founded by former Marshall Field's partner Harry Gordon Selfridge, have been active as recently as 2015.

== Legacy ==
Lundgren conceded that "[they] threw a lot of change on the May company stores very quickly" in 2007, which contributed to the lackluster performance of several acquired locations. In a retrospective article for Retail Dive in 2016, Lee Peterson suggested that Macy's discouraged loyal customers by choosing "elusive 'efficiencies' over specialization". He also suggested replacing the regional buying strategies with the present-day national approach saw Macy's "[become] big generalists in a category that had personalization and specialization right decades ago", and consequently lost its differentiating factors.

== See also ==
- List of department stores converted to Macy's
- List of defunct department stores of the United States
