= Filene's =

American department store chain

- Exterior of the former Filene's Department Store flagship store in Downtown Crossing
- Formerly: William Filene & Sons Co.
- Type: Subsidiary
- Industry: Retail
- Genre: Department stores
- Founded: 1881; 145 years ago in Boston, Massachusetts, United States
- Founder: William Filene
- Defunct: September 9, 2006; 20 years ago
- Fate: Acquisition by Federated Department Stores
- Successor: Macy's
- Headquarters: Filene's Department Store, Boston, Massachusetts, United States
- Number of locations: 47 (2005)
- Areas served: New England; New York
- Key people: Abraham Lincoln Filene; Edward Filene
- Products: Clothing; footwear; bedding; furniture; jewelry; beauty products; housewares
- Parent: Federated Department Stores (1929–1988, 2005–2006); The May Department Stores Company (1988–2005)

Filene's Department Store Final Logo

Filene's (Note: /faɪˈliːnz/) was an American department store chain founded in 1881 by William Filene. The historic Filene's Department Store in the Downtown Crossing district of Boston, Massachusetts housed the flagship store and headquarters, while branch stores operated throughout New England and New York. Filene's was a founding member of the Federated Department Stores holding company in 1929. It was acquired by The May Department Stores Company in 1988, and expanded with the mergers of G. Fox & Co. in 1992 and Steiger's in 1994. Filene's and Kaufmann's were merged into a single division in 2002, although they maintained their individual brands.

May was acquired by Federated in 2005, which dissolved Filene's and converted stores to Macy's in 2006. The former flagship store was divested after Federated retained the adjacent, existing Macy's that was converted from Jordan Marsh in 1996, however, the building was designated a Boston Landmark in 2006. As of 2025, current tenants include advertising agencies Arnold Worldwide and Havas Media, and fast fashion retailer Primark.

Filene's Basement was established in the basement of the Filene's Department Store in 1908, and evolved into a distinct off-price store chain. It was spun-off by Federated in 1988, and experienced several ownership changes before filing for bankruptcy and liquidating in 2011.

== History ==
=== Origins ===
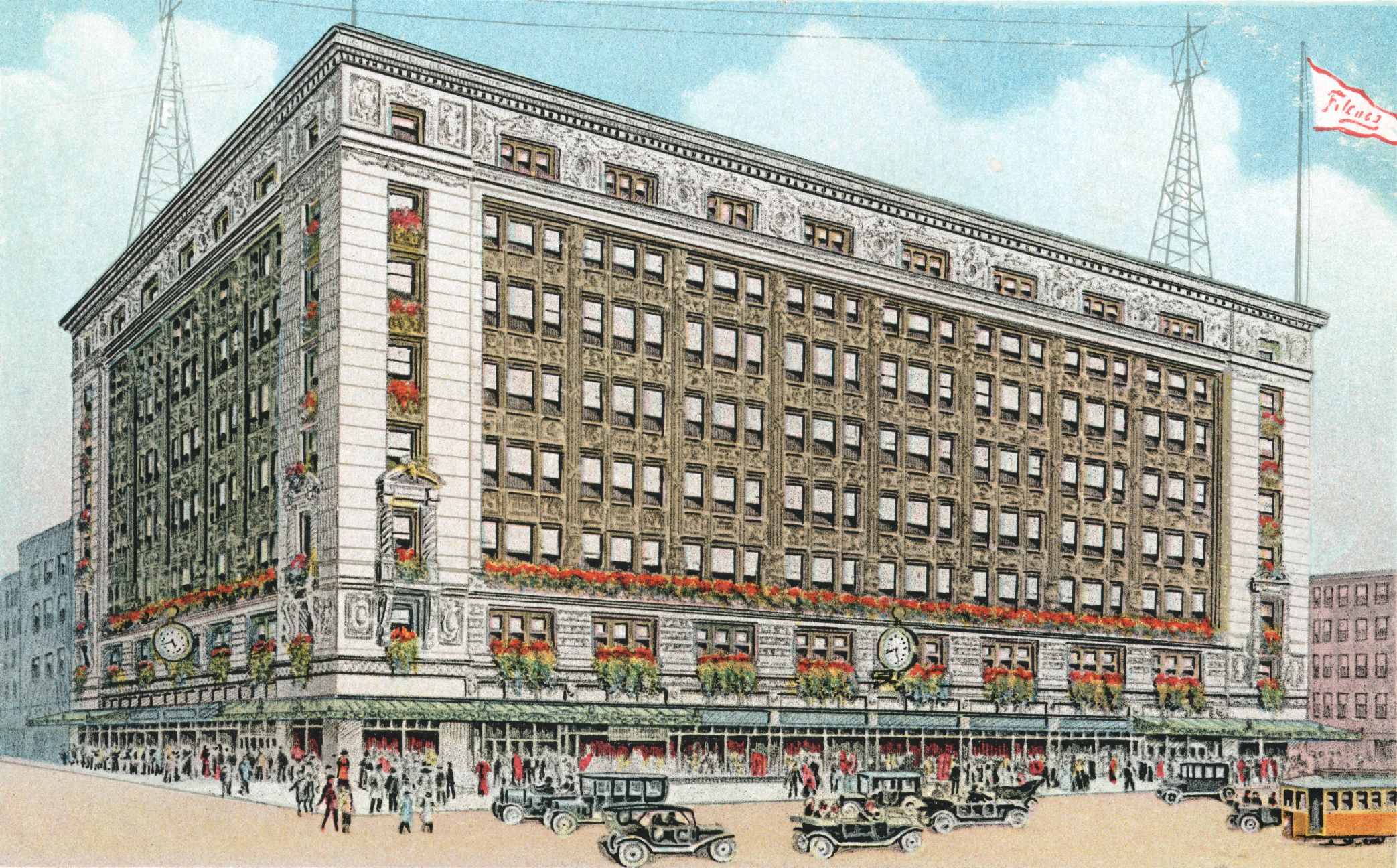
Drawing of the Filene's Department Store c. 1912

The precursor of the main company was a store opened in 1881 by William Filene. Filene was a German Jewish immigrant from Posen, Prussia (now Poznań in Poland). He immigrated to Boston in 1848. Although William Filene is credited with creating Filene's, it was his sons, Edward Filene and Abraham Lincoln Filene, who expanded the business greatly. Edward and Lincoln were two of the best known businessmen in America and were responsible for converting their father's clothing store into one of the largest department stores in the country. The two sons assumed management of the store in 1891 and inherited the store upon their father's death in 1901; by that the company was known as William Filene's Sons & Company.

In 1908, Edward Filene opened the automatic bargain annex or Filene's Basement as a way to sell excess merchandise from the upstairs department store. He also developed an automatic mark-down schedule to reduce the price of merchandise, used thereafter for decades. Edward's influence gave Filene's an early reputation as a customer oriented store with slogans like “money back if not satisfied.”

A new main store, Filene's Department Store, was completed in 1912 in Boston on the corner of Washington and Summer streets, by Chicago architect Daniel Burnham as his last major project. By 1929 Filene's expanded the main building, converting the block around Washington, Summer, Hawley and Franklin streets into one department store.

Filene's is also a founding member of the International Association of Department Stores in 1928, which is still active as of today.

=== Establishment of Federated ===
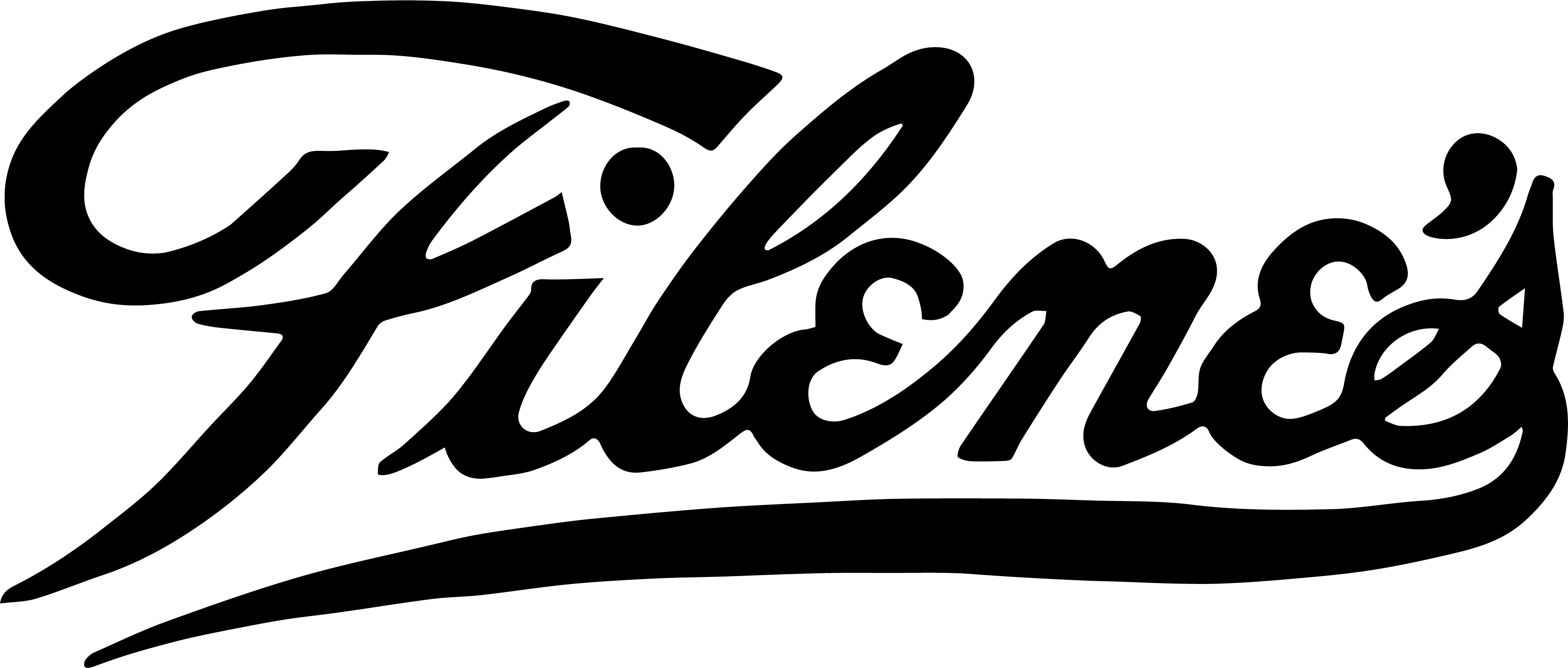
Filene's logo, in use from 1929

Also during 1929, Filene's joined Abraham & Straus and Lazarus as the founding members of Federated Department Stores. From the 1930s through 1990s Filene's continued expanding beyond New England with the country growing and adapting to new shopping malls. Filene's main rival company during this period was Jordan Marsh, whose main store, like Filene's, was located in Downtown Crossing in Boston, and was also making the transition, expanding into shopping malls. In 1947, the Filene's Basement trade-name was first applied to an annual bridal gown sale. Lines extending around the store made it famous.

=== Acquisition by May ===
In 1988, after the leveraged buyout of Federated Department Stores by Campeau Corp. of Toronto, Ontario, Canada, the division was sold to May Department Stores Co. along with Foley's of Houston. It was then that the Filene's and Filene's Basement trade-names were disassociated. In 1992, Filene's absorbed G. Fox & Co. of Hartford, Connecticut, and Steiger's in 1994, two other divisions of May Company. During the 1990s there was a doubling of the Filene's organization as May invested in new stores and variegated Filene's price and product assortments. In 2002 Filene's assumed operational control of the Kaufmann's stores in Ohio, Pennsylvania, West Virginia, and western New York state.

=== Acquisition by Federated and conversion to Macy's ===
Speculated since the early 2000s, Federated announced its planned acquisition of May in February 2005. The likelihood that the May nameplates would be replaced by the Federated-owned Macy's was acknowledged, citing the "considerable success in re-branding [Federated's] regional stores as Macy's" and that "operating regional stores primarily under one brand means [they] can advertise nationally, unlike regional retailers, which is more cost-effective;" the changes were unlikely to occur before 2006. Indeed, the company-wide conversion to Macy's was confirmed in July, and the merger was completed in August.

Federated continued to divest "duplicate" properties in shopping malls where Filene's and Macy's were both present; prior to consolidation, Filene's operated 47 locations across Connecticut, Maine, Massachusetts, New Hampshire, New York, Rhode Island and Vermont. In regards to Downtown Crossing, however, the company remained uncertain whether the Filene's Department Store or the neighboring former Jordan Marsh flagship store (that became Macy's in the mid-1990s) would be retained. Then-Boston Mayor Thomas Menino expressed his preference for "marrying Macy's to the Filene's building." Ultimately, the existing Macy's location was left intact and the Filene's store was closed in 2006.

The last remaining Filene's stores closed on September 9, 2006, with the conversion of the May-owned nameplates, Macy's had become a national retailer with over 800 stores. Upon receiving approval from shareholders that Federated itself be renamed Macy's, Inc. in 2007, then-CEO Terry Lundgren admitted that business was struggling from "[having thrown] a lot of change on the May company stores very quickly."

== Legacy ==
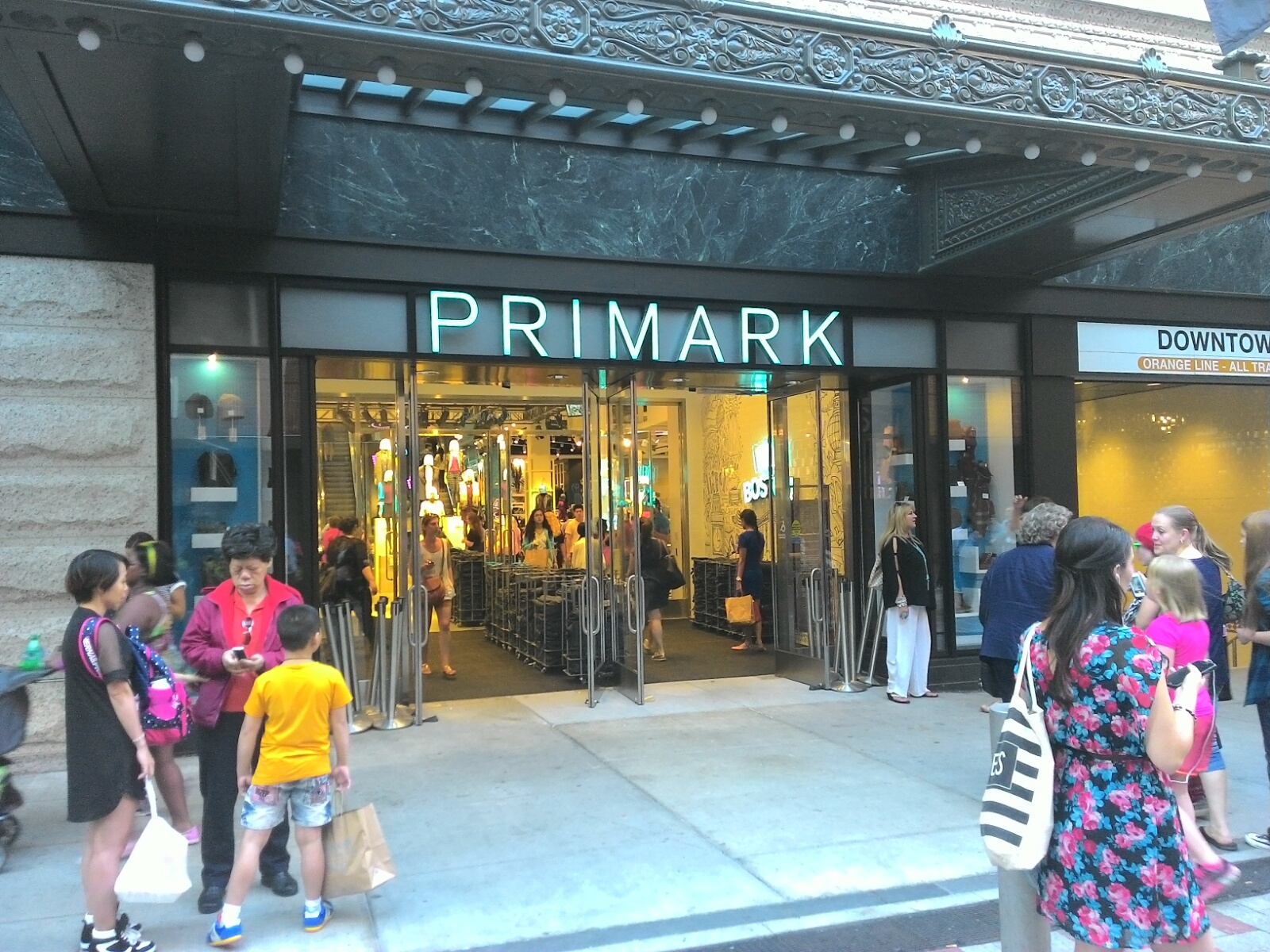
Primark flagship store in the former Filene's Department Store (2015)

When Filene's closed, the Boston Landmarks Commission voted unanimously to protect the two oldest buildings that housed Filene's, the main 1912 store and a 1905 former glassware and china seller's building on the opposite corner. Two newer buildings, built in 1951 and 1973, were demolished in 2008.

Surprisingly, though many Bostonians felt a sense of loss, the public did not protest the closing, unlike that of Marshall Field's in Chicago, and Kaufmann's in Pittsburgh. Boston had already lost many local companies to larger companies in the region, especially New York City, including The New York Times's acquisition of the Boston Globe and the subsumption of the Bank of Boston and Fleet Bank into Bank of America. The Boston Landmarks Commission only protected the façade of each building, allowing developers to rip out the buildings' interiors, including the original paneling installed in the main store. When the project ran out of money, the buildings were left completely gutted.

In mid-2014, advertising and public relations company Havas opened offices for several of its divisions (including advertising agency Arnold Worldwide and media planning division Havas Media) in the former Filene's Department Store. Earlier that year, Irish fast fashion retailer Primark announced that they would open their first location in the United States in the since-renamed Burnham Building. The four-level, 77,000 ft^{2} (7,200 m^{2}) flagship store opened in September 2015, a mural inspired by the Filene's origin of the building was installed on the second floor.

== Filene's Basement ==
By the direction of company president Edward Filene, Filene's opened its famous "Automatic Bargain Basement" in 1909, which became a much-visited tourist attraction. The concept of the bargain basement was not new (Marshall Field's created the first in 1879), but Filene's basement was well lit and decorated ostentatiously. The basement had its own staff which bought surplus, factory clearances, overstock, or closeout merchandise - Filene boasted that he had once sold more than 7,000 pairs of woolen underwear during two July days. Goods were marked down according to an automatic schedule; an item that had been on sale for 12 days was marked down by 25 percent, after 18 days by 50 percent, after 24 days by 75 percent, and after 30 days it was given away. Ninety percent of goods sold in the basement were purchased within the first 12 days of sale.

Filene's Basement was separately owned and operated by Retail Ventures, Inc. until 2009 when it was sold to Buxbaum Group, a liquidation company. The Filene's Basement stores were not affected by the Filene's/Macy's merger. However, in 2007, the original Filene's Basement location was closed while the old Filene's building was being gutted and rebuilt. At the time of the closing, the store was expected to relocate back into its basement space in 2010; however, the Filene's Basement company began its third Chapter 11 bankruptcy in November 2011, liquidating and permanently closing all of its stores in December 2011.

== Gallery ==
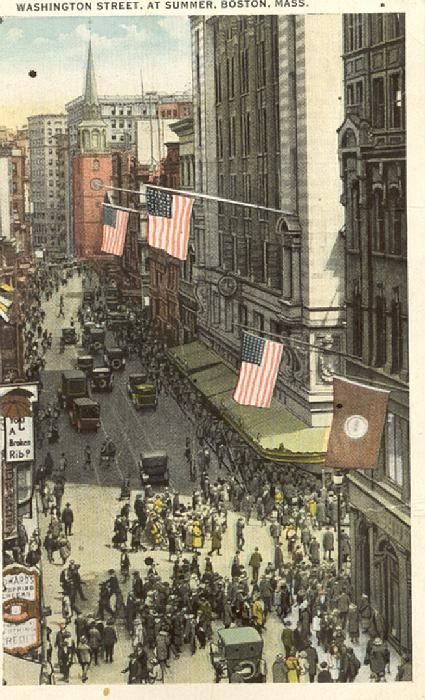
Shoppers hurry around Filene's (center right) on Washington Street in Boston.

Filene's advertisement on back of Red Sox baseball ticket.

Boston's own variation of the saying "meet me under the clock" with the Filene's clock on Washington Street (2008)

== See also ==
- List of defunct department stores of the United States
- List of department stores converted to Macy's
- Downtown Crossing, shopping district in which Filene's flagship store was located
- Jordan Marsh, another Boston-based department store chain acquired by Federated and converted to Macy's
- Mitchells Stores
