= Innovation Trail =

Historical walk in Boston

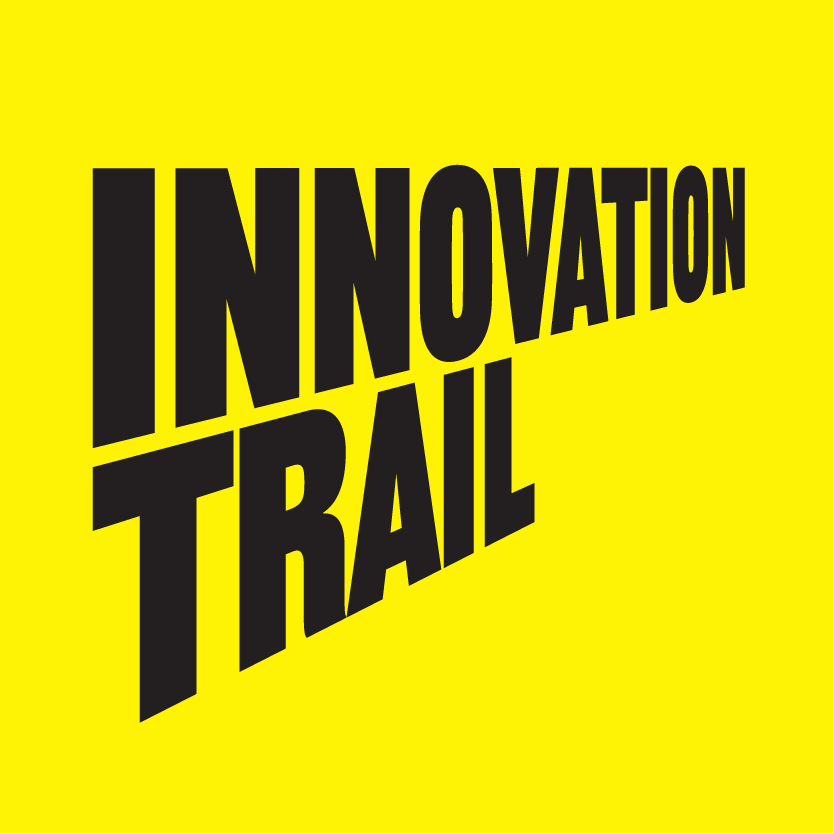
- Location: Boston and Cambridge, Massachusetts
- Established: 2022
- Trailheads: Downtown Crossing (Boston); Kendall Square (Cambridge)
- Website: https://www.theinnovationtrail.org/

Innovation Trail is an urban walking trail in Massachusetts, stretching from Downtown Crossing in Boston to Kendall Square in Cambridge. The trail has 21 stops focusing on the history of innovation in the Greater Boston area.

== History ==
The Innovation Trail was founded in 2022 by Scott Kirsner, a columnist for the Boston Globe, and Bob Krim, a professor at Framingham State University. The two were inspired by the Freedom Trail. Kirsner had originally proposed the idea for an innovation-focused trail in a 2013 column. According to Kirsner, the trail aims to "change the narrative" about innovation, which is often associated strongly with Silicon Valley.

In 2023, Boston magazine ranked it as the best walking tour in Boston. The Innovation Trail was awarded a grant by the state of Massachusetts as part of the Massachusetts 250 Initiative, which aims to highlight "firsts" achieved by the state ahead of the 250th anniversary of the beginning of the American Revolutionary War.

== Trail ==
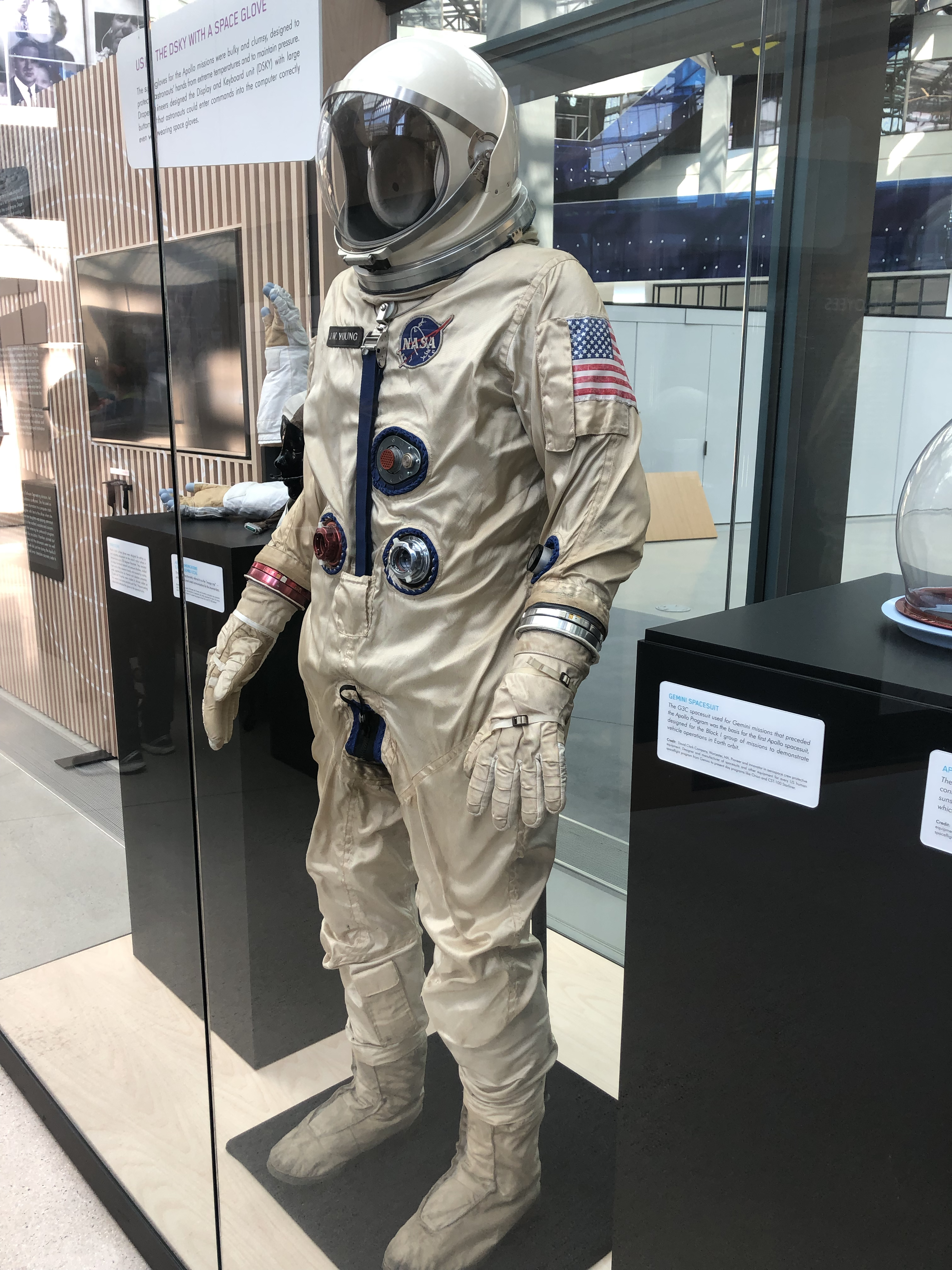
A Project Gemini spacesuit at Draper Laboratory, which is featured on the Innovation Trail.

The Innovation Trail is a walking trail with 21 stops across Boston and Cambridge, Massachusetts. The trail focuses on the history of science, technology, engineering, and mathematics (STEM) in the cities. It focuses on Boston's role in the development of technologies like the telephone, biopharmaceuticals, and vaccines. The trail's path is from Downtown Crossing in Boston to Kendall Square in Cambridge. Locations along the trail are marked by plaques, visitor centers, or exhibits. In Downtown Crossing, the trail starts with a patent office where Lewis Latimer worked on patents for Alexander Graham Bell, and it ends at the last functioning candy factory in Cambridge, where Junior Mints are produced. Other locations in between include the lab where Moderna's COVID-19 vaccine was created, and Draper Laboratory, which created navigation hardware and software used by the Apollo program.

The Innovation Trail can be walked individually, or as a guided tour run by Boston History Company. Tours run year-round, but are most popular in summer. A particular focus on the trail is Kendall Square, known as "the most innovative square mile on the planet" due to the large number of innovations that are credited to the area. Four science museums are located on the trail, including the Museum of Science and the MIT Museum.
