= ROTB =

ROTB may refer to:

- Running of the Brides, a defunct one-day sale of wedding gowns
- Transformers: Rise of the Beasts, a 2023 American science fiction action film
