= Syms Corporation =

Off-price clothing store chain

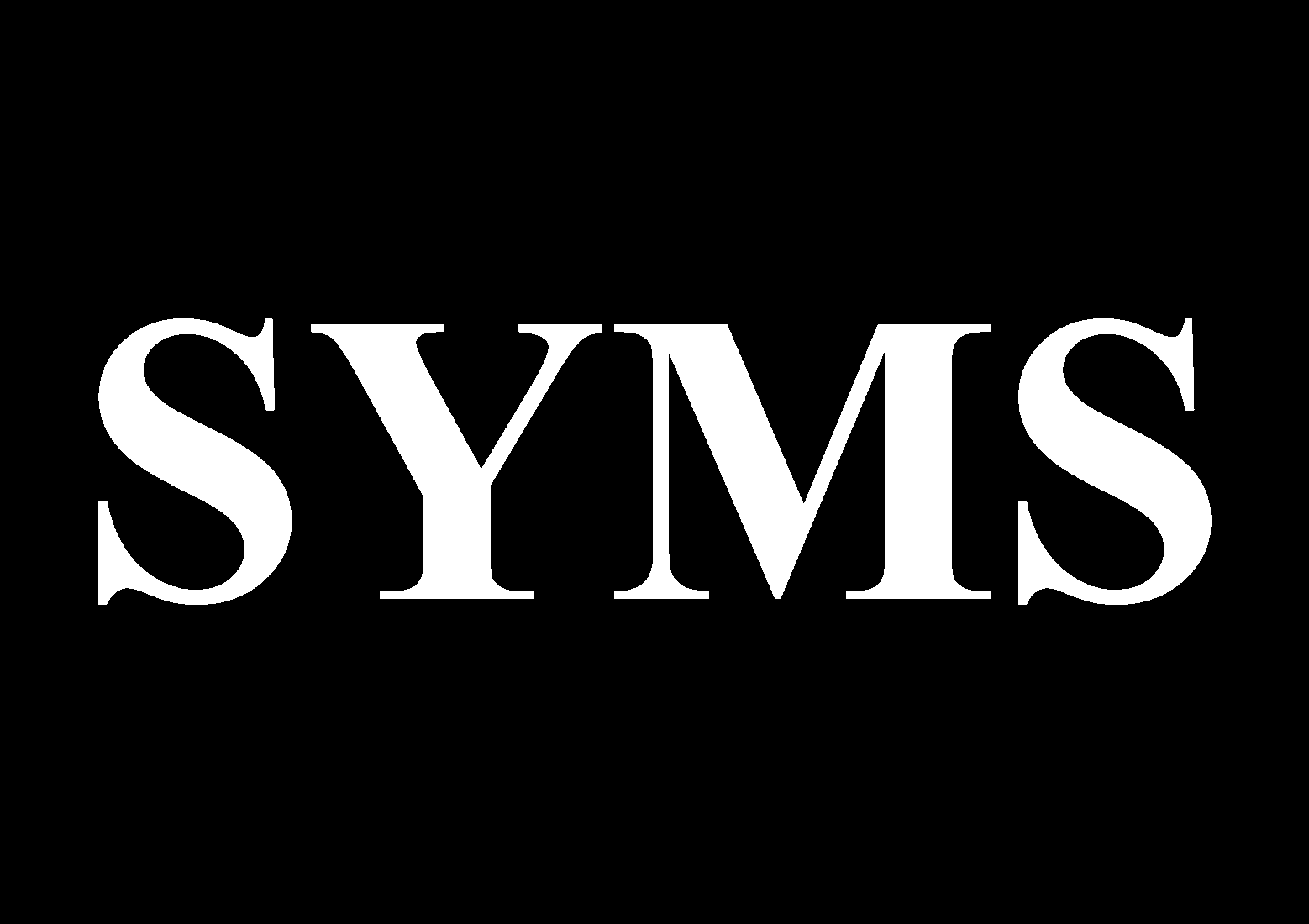
- Industry: Retail
- Founded: 1958 (68 years ago) New York City
- Founder: Sy Syms
- Defunct: 2011 (15 years ago)
- Fate: Chapter 11 bankruptcy protection, followed by Liquidation Sale & Closure
- Headquarters: Secaucus, New Jersey, United States
- Number of locations: 55 Syms and Filene's Basement
- Key people: Sy Syms; Marcy Syms
- Products: Clothing
- Subsidiaries: Filene's Basement (acquired in 2009)

Syms Corp (styled as SYMS) was an off-price retail clothing store chain, founded by Sy Syms in 1958. Its headquarters was in Secaucus, New Jersey, where it became a public company, traded on the New York Stock Exchange (SYM) in 1983. The company also owned Filene's Basement, which it acquired in June 2009.

At its height, the company and its subsidiary collectively owned and operated a chain of 55 "off-price" retail stores in 16 states; the company employed approximately 3,800 full and part-time workers. Each SYMS and Filene's Basement store offered a broad range of merchandise from nationally recognized designer or brand-name labels for men, women, and children.

On November 2, 2011, SYMS and Filene's Basement collectively filed for Chapter 11 bankruptcy protection. All SYMS and Filene's Basement stores were closed at the end of December 2011.

== History ==
In 1958, after a dispute with his brother over the clothing store they had inherited from their father, then Seymour Merns left to open a rival men's clothing store on Cortlandt Street in New York City's Financial District. The store, which was initially named Sy Merns, competed directly with his family's original store on Vesey Street. However, he was forced to shorten the store's name to SYMS after legal action was taken against him by his brother. Merns later had his name legally changed to Sy Syms to match the store.

The company slowly expanded during the 1960s and 1970s. The company aired its first television commercial in 1974. In the commercial, SYMS debuted the company's slogan, "An educated consumer is our best customer." The slogan was used by SYMS until its close in 2011.

By 1983, Syms had taken the company public with an initial public offering, netting himself about $25 million in the process, and expanded the chain to include eleven retail locations. The company continued to expand throughout the 1980s and 90s, at its height peaking at forty-eight locations. In 1998, Sy's daughter Marcy Syms was named chief executive officer, though Sy remained as chairman of the board and continued to come to work every day.

The early 21st century presented tough times for SYMS, with its first loss in its history in 2000, followed up by three more consecutive years of losses between 2001 and 2004. In 2009, the company acquired the bankrupt Filene's Basement low-cost chain for $62.4 million. But the acquisition could not help the struggling company succeed in a poor economy, with increased competition from large department stores. On November 2, 2011, SYMS and Filene's Basement collectively filed for Chapter 11 bankruptcy protection, with all stores to close by the end of the year. The combined companies had 46 locations and employed some 2,500 workers.

== Company leadership ==
=== Sy Syms ===
Sy Syms (1926–2009), who was born Seymour Merinsky, was a former sports broadcaster and regularly appeared in the company's television and radio commercials. He is also credited with coining the company's slogan, "An Educated Consumer is our Best Customer". Syms was founder of the company and remained chairman of the board until his death in November 2009. His daughter, Marcy Syms, succeeded him as chair in January 2010.

=== Marcy Syms ===
Marcy Syms joined the family business in 1978 as director of marketing and real estate. In 1983, when SYMS Corp went public, she was named president and a year later, added the role of chief operating officer. In 1998, she was named chief executive officer, and in 2009, she led the company through the purchase of Filene's Basement. She also steered the company through the closing and liquidation process, and eventual transition to new management (Trinity Place Holdings, Inc.). Since the closing of SYMS Corp and her departure, Marcy Syms remains an active philanthropist who has continued to facilitate raising the level of awareness for public television and the programing challenges it faces by diminished funding. In addition, she is the president of the Sy Syms Foundation and an original trustee of the board of overseers at the Sy Syms School of Business.

== See also ==
- List of defunct retailers of the United States
