= Sy Syms =

American businessperson

- Born: Seymour Merinsky; May 12, 1926; Brooklyn, New York City, US
- Died: November 17, 2009 (aged 83); Manhattan, New York City, US
- Education: New York University
- Spouse: Ruth Glickman Merns (divorced) Lynn Tamarkin
- Children: 6 and 2 stepchildren

Sy Syms (May 12, 1926 – November 17, 2009) was an American businessman, entrepreneur and philanthropist, who founded the SYMS off-price clothing chain in New York City in 1959.

== Biography ==
Syms was born Seymour Merinsky on May 12, 1926, in New York City. He was the youngest of eight children of Jewish parents who had emigrated from Russia. His family decided to change their surname from "Merinsky" to "Merns" when his father and elder brother George opened a store on Vesey Street in Lower Manhattan. Syms went to Midwood High School in Brooklyn. After serving in the United States Army, he attended New York University on the G.I. Bill.

He initially began a career as a sportscaster and reporter in Maryland and West Virginia. However, in 1950 Syms returned to New York City in order to work at the family's store. In 1959, Syms opened a men's clothing store on nearby Cortlandt Street in New York City's Financial District. The store, which was initially named Sy Merns, competed directly with his family's original store on Vesey Street. However, he was forced to change the store's name to simply SYMS, after legal action was taken against him. He later had his name legally changed to Sy Syms to match the store.

The company slowly expanded during the 1960s and 1970s. By 1983, Syms had taken the company public with an initial public offering and expanded the chain to include eleven retail locations. At its height, the chain had 48 locations in thirteen states. On November 2, 2011, Syms Corp. and its subsidiary Filene's Basement, filed for Chapter 11 bankruptcy protection after more than a half a century in the clothing business.

Sy Syms remained the company's CEO until his retirement in 1998, when he was succeeded by his daughter, Marcy Syms. He remained the company's chairman until he died of heart failure at his home in Manhattan, New York City, on November 17, 2009.

== Personal life ==
His first marriage, to Ruth Glickman Merns, ended in divorce. They had six children: Marcy, Robert, Richard, Laura, Stephen (died in 1998), and Adrienne (died in 1999). His second wife was Lynn Tamarkin, by whom he had two step-children, Cary Tamarkin and Leslie Tamarkin. Funeral services were held at Temple Emanu-El in Manhattan.

== Sy Syms Foundation ==
The non-profit Sy Syms Foundation was founded by Syms in 1985 with his personal funds, to support education. It has given away over $30,000,000 and has contributed toward the continued growth of many institutions of higher learning including the Syms School of Business at Yeshiva University, and many organizations which provide funding for education.

The foundation has been a major supporter of public broadcasting and National Public Radio (NPR) through the underwriting of various programming.

Marcy Syms was instrumental in developing many of the grant-relationships made possible by her late father's generosity, and is a founding trustee of the foundation, elected to the role of president in 1997. The foundation has its offices in Fort Lee, New Jersey.
