= Filene's Department Store =

Building in Boston, Massachusetts

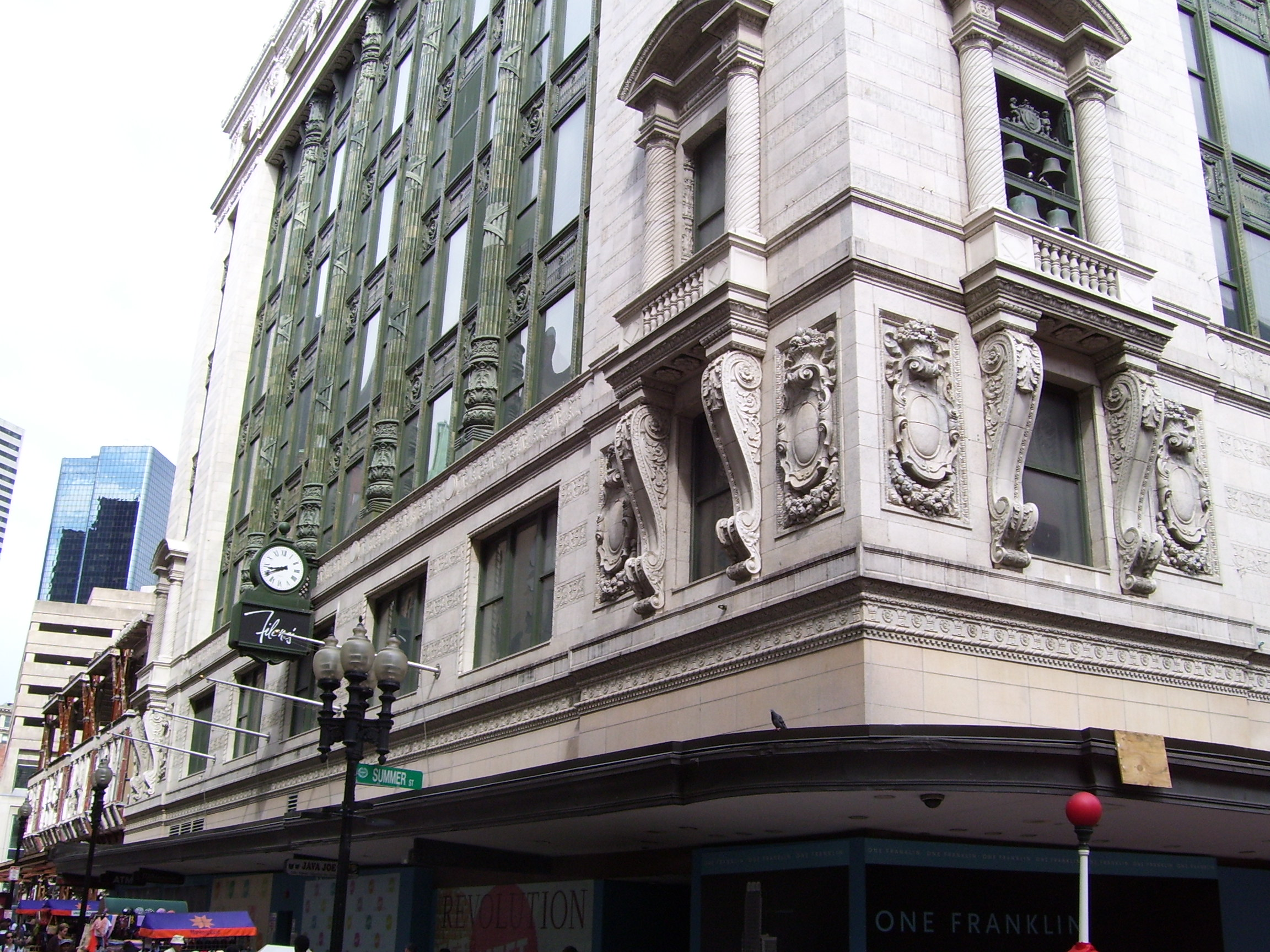
- Exterior of Filene's Department Store (2008)
- Interactive map of the Filene's Department Store area

General information
- Type: Department store; office
- Architectural style: Beaux Arts
- Location: 426 Washington Street, Boston, Massachusetts, United States
- Coordinates: 42°21′19.78″N 71°3′36.82″W
- Current tenants: Arnold Worldwide; Havas; Primark; Roche Bros.
- Opened: 1912; 114 years ago (Filene's)
- Closed: September 7, 2006; 19 years ago (Filene's)
- Client: Abraham Lincoln Filene; Edward Filene
- Owner: Millennium Partners

Technical details
- Floor count: 9 (Note: Floor count includes one basement level and eight above-ground levels.)

Design and construction
- Architect: Daniel Burnham
- Architecture firm: Daniel H. Burnham & Co.

Other information
- Public transit: Downtown Crossing: Red Line; Orange Line
- Filene's Department Store
- U.S. National Register of Historic Places
- NRHP reference No.: 86001909
- Added to NRHP: July 24, 1986

Filene's Department Store is a former department store building in the Downtown Crossing shopping district in Boston, Massachusetts, United States. It was designed by Daniel Burnham for Abraham Lincoln Filene and Edward Filene, and opened in 1912. It was the flagship store of the Filene's department store chain, was acquired by Federated Department Stores in 2005, and closed in favor of the adjacent, Federated-owned Macy's store in 2006. The building has since been incorporated into the base of the Millennium Tower residential skyscraper, and the original space has been renovated into offices for Arnold Worldwide and Havas, and retail space for Primark and Roche Bros.

== History ==
=== Development and use ===
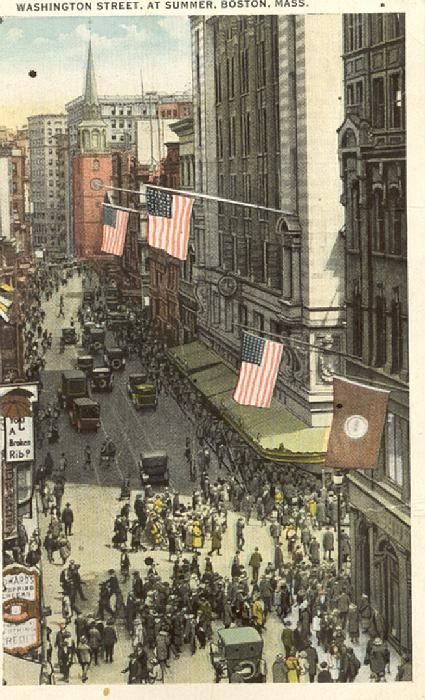
Filene's in an early 20th-century postcard

The building was completed in 1912 as a new flagship location for William Filene and Sons' department store, better known as Filene's. By 1929 Filene's expanded the flagship building, converting the whole block around Washington, Summer, Hawley and Franklin streets into one department store. This was the last major project by legendary Chicago architect Daniel Burnham and his only work in Boston. This building was widely regarded as one of the best examples of Beaux Arts architecture in Boston.

In 1986, the Filene's Building was added to the National Register of Historic Places. In 2006, Filene's stores were merged with Macy's phasing out the Filene's name. In a normal store merger, the old stores are converted into the new stores. But this was a problem in Boston, because the Filene's building was located across the street from another Macy's store. When Filene's did close, the Boston Landmarks Commission unanimously voted to protect two of the historic buildings that housed Filene's in Boston. The two oldest buildings were protected including the main 1912 Filene's store building and a 1905 former glassware and china seller's building on the opposite corner. Two newer buildings, built in 1951 and 1973, were not protected, and were demolished in 2008.

=== Sale and refurbishment ===
After the store closed, the building was marketed and was eventually bought by Vornado Realty Trust of New York. Vornado teamed up with Gale International for a $700 million redevelopment of the Filene's site. The project contained a 39-story tower including a 280-room hotel, 125-seat restaurant, 475,000 square feet (44,100 m^{2}) of office space, 166 residential condos, 300,000 square feet (28,000 m^{2}) of retail space, and an adjacent park. Although the Filene's Building was protected by the Landmarks Commission, it only protected the facade of the building. This allowed the developers of the site to rip out the building's interior, leaving the exterior to stand on its own. However, when the project ran out of money, the site was left completely gutted and missing walls from the razed 1951 and 1973 additions. The city of Boston eventually revoked the permit on the project.

The site was taken over by another developer, Millennium Partners of New York. Plans include 135,000 square feet (12,500 m^{2}) of retail on the lower floors and nearly 200,000 square feet (19,000 m^{2}) office space on the upper floors, including a restoration of many original architectural details. The project also includes a glass tower next door, which will contain 450 luxury residences and another 95,000 square feet (8,800 m^{2}) of retail space.

Irish clothing company Primark opened its first U.S. store September 10, 2015, on the first four floors of the restored Burnham Building; Roche Bros. supermarket occupies the basement, with an additional grab-and-go shop at street level on Summer Street. Havas and Arnold Worldwide occupy floors 5-8.

== See also ==
- Millennium Tower (Boston, Massachusetts)
- National Register of Historic Places listings in northern Boston, Massachusetts
