= Roche Bros. =

Supermarket chains in Massachusetts, United States

Roche Bros. Supermarkets, Inc.

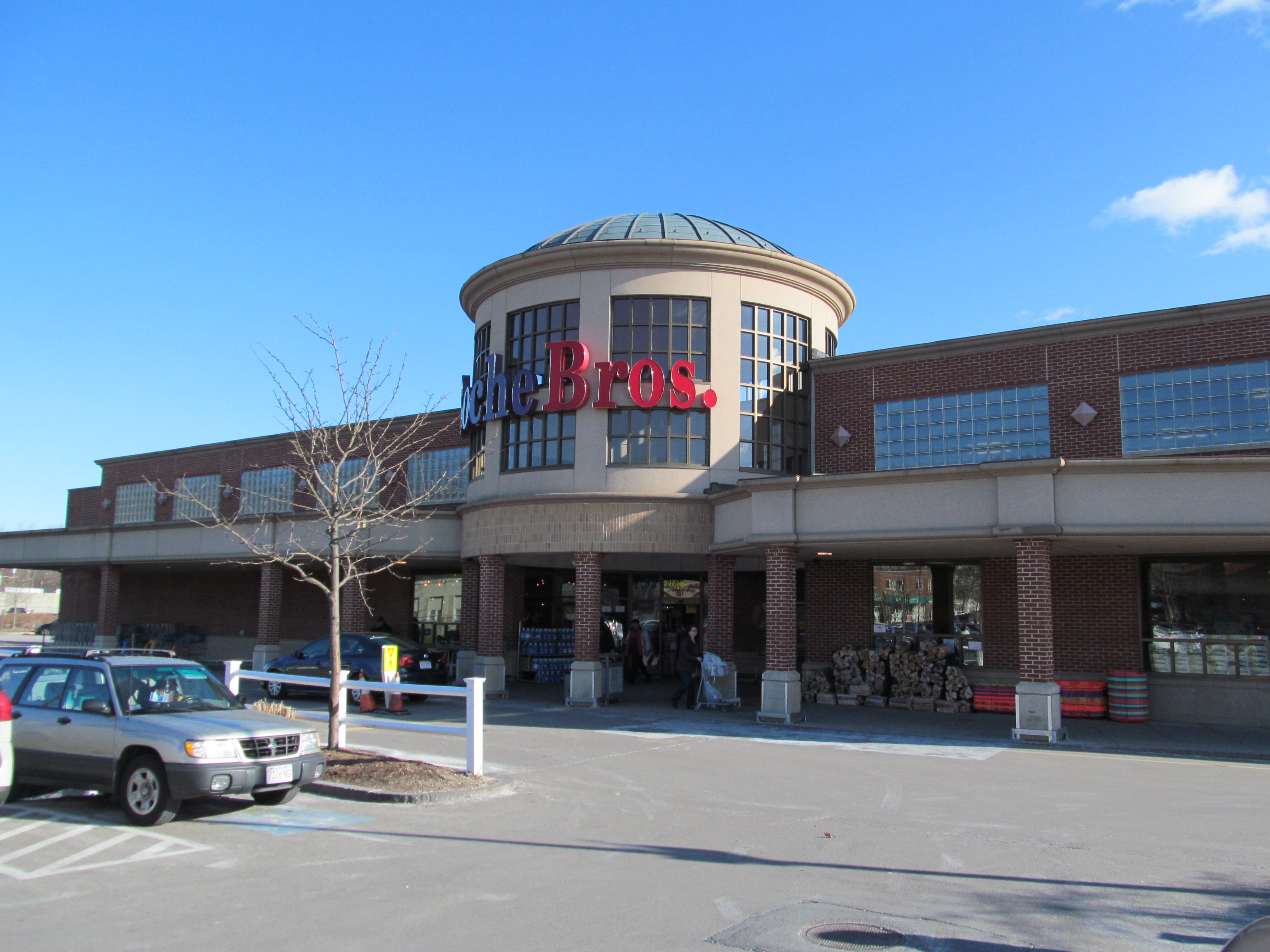
- Storefront of Roche Bros. in West Roxbury, Boston, Massachusetts
- Type: Private
- Industry: Retail
- Founded: 1952; 74 years ago in Roslindale, Boston, Massachusetts
- Founders: Pat and Bud Roche
- Headquarters: Mansfield, Massachusetts, United States
- Number of locations: 20 (2021)
- Area served: Massachusetts
- Revenue: ▲$389 million (2019)
- Owner: Bozzuto's Inc. (51% in 2024)
- Number of employees: 4,600 (2019)
- Website: rochebros.com

Roche Bros. Supermarkets, Inc. is a chain of supermarkets based in Mansfield, Massachusetts. The company's stores are primarily located in the Boston Metro Area. Roche Bros. also operates the supermarket chain Sudbury Farms.

A third banner, Brothers Marketplace, primarily the next-generation concept of the brothers Ed and Rick Roche, has five locations: the first one was opened in Weston, Massachusetts and a second in Medfield, Massachusetts, both in 2014. Since then three more have been opened: Waltham, Massachusetts in 2018, Duxbury, Massachusetts in 2019, and Cambridge, Massachusetts, also in 2019. The Waltham location closed nearly three years after it opened in May 2021.

== History ==
Pat and Bud Roche opened their first store in Roslindale, Massachusetts in 1952 as a meat and produce shop. The store expanded to include groceries in 1957. The brothers later passed down the company to their sons Jay, Ed, and Rick Roche.

On April 29, 2015, a Roche Bros. store opened in Boston's Downtown Crossing in the space formerly occupied by the original Filene's Basement.

As of May 2019, the chain had 15 Roche Bros. and two Sudbury Farms locations.

In October 2024, a 51% controlling interest of the company was sold to Bozzuto's.

== Locations ==
Roche Bros. Supermarkets, Inc. currently operates in 20 locations.

=== Roche Bros. ===
- Acton, Boston (Downtown Crossing and West Roxbury), Bridgewater, Easton, Marshfield, Mashpee, Millis, Natick, Needham, Norton (formerly), Sudbury, Waltham (formerly), Watertown, Wellesley, Westborough, Westwood

=== Sudbury Farms ===
- Needham

=== Brothers Marketplace ===
- Cambridge, Duxbury, Medfield, Weston
