= Bargain bin =

Assorted selection of merchandise

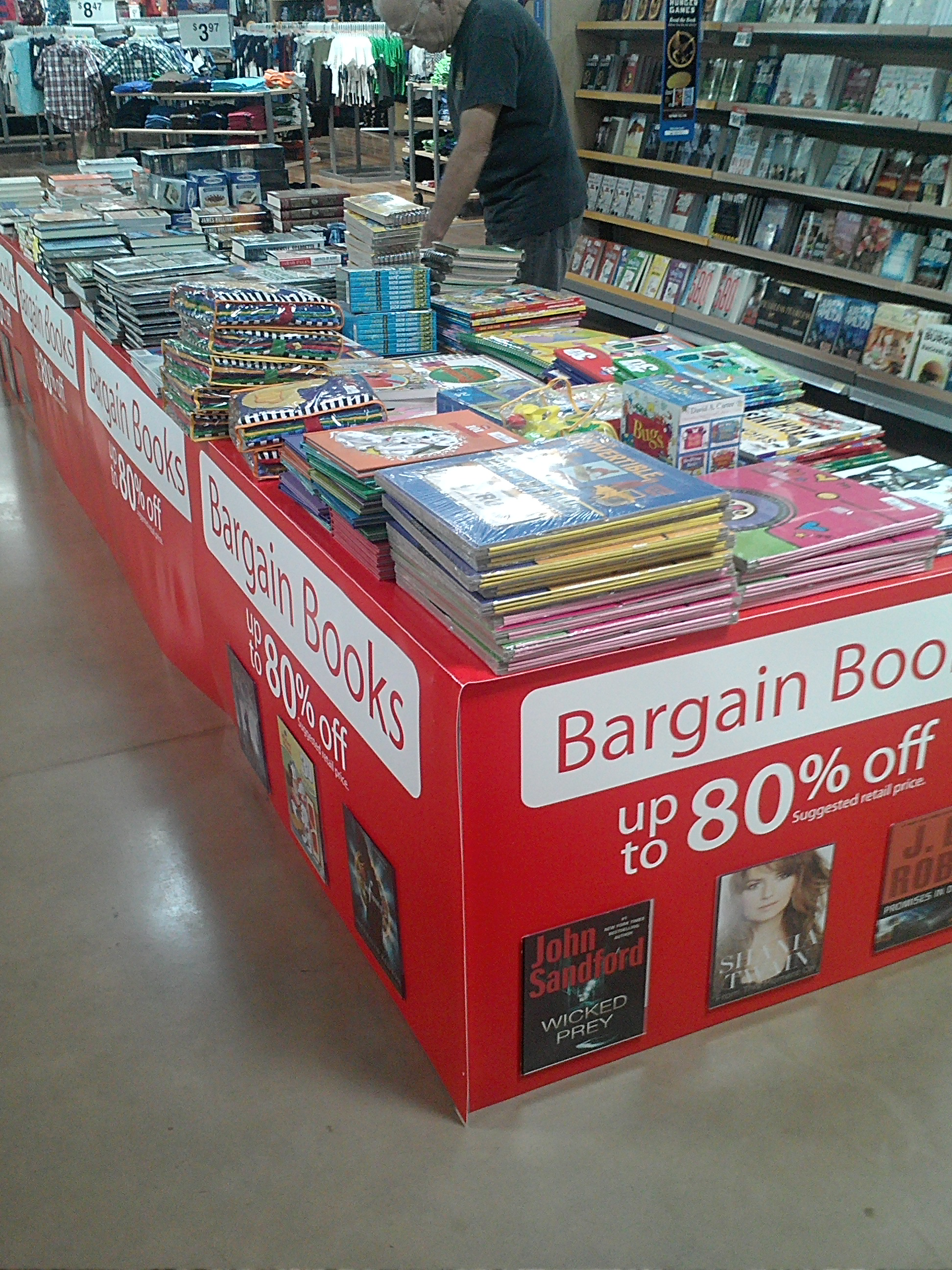
Bargain bins in Walmart, featuring heavily discounted books

A bargain bin refers to an assorted selection of merchandise, particularly clothing, tools and optical discs, which have been discounted in price. Reasons for the discount can range from the closure of a production company to a steep decline in an item's popularity in the aftermath of a fad or scandal. Another reason for the discount can be the particular product line being discontinued. The origin of the term comes from the fact such items would be found in an isolated bin rather than on store shelves.

The phrase "bargain basement" is now a synonym. "Bargain basement" used to be a literal basement in downtown department stores. Clearance merchandise would be placed there regardless of which section of the store it originally came from. Chicago's Marshall Field's had begun selling discounted stock from its cellar level before 1910, and many retailers followed suit. The country's first bargain counter was operated by Hutzler's at its Baltimore location. "Hutzler's Downstairs", an outlet for discounted merchandise opened in the basement of Hutzler's Baltimore department store in September 1929.

"Bargain Basement" was also used figuratively to describe the purchase of professional footballers from clubs in lower divisions by richer clubs for a low fee. In more recent years, both terms have taken on a figurative meaning – most notably as a synonym for 'low-quality' or 'unimpressive'. The most common implication of an item's presence in a bargain bin is its low quality. "Knock-offs", for example, are associated with the term.

The term "bargain bin" is used in New Zealand, Australia, and some other countries to refer to a retailer whose primary function is to sell cheap goods (i.e., a variety store).

== See also ==
- Inferior good
- Variety store
- Filene's Basement
- Shovelware
- Mockbuster
