= Running of the Brides =

The Running of the Brides was a one-day sale of wedding gowns, garnering local media attention because of the sight of hundreds of brides-to-be scrambling for bargains. A local tradition since 1947 at Filene's Basement in downtown Boston, the ROTB has also been held at Filene's Basement in Atlanta, Chicago, Cleveland, Columbus, Los Angeles, New York City, Washington D.C., and Westchester County (New York).

== Details ==
The store stocked thousands of gowns for that day and marked them down drastically; gowns were non-returnable. Prices ranged from $249.00 to $699.00, marked down from retail prices as high as $9,000. Prospective brides and their hovering mothers, sisters, and friends lined up the night before the doors opened at 8:00 a.m., to join the crush. Most "bridal groups" wore the same color shirts and communicated with each other using whistles or bells, in order to help locate one another.

In the first few minutes, patrons ran as fast as they could and took as many dresses off the racks as possible. The racks were emptied quickly, and immediately trading began. Most brides tried the gowns on in the aisles or in front of mirrors, while their helpers ran around trying to trade and barter. When a bride-to-be found "The One", others applauded her.

== Closure ==
After the flagship Filene's Basement store in downtown Boston closed in 2007, subsequent Running of the Brides events took place at the Hynes Convention Center, beginning in 2008. The final such event occurred at the chain's Newton, Massachusetts store on October 28, 2011. Filene's Basement declared bankruptcy five days later and suspended operations in December 2011.
