= Filene's Basement =

American department store chain

- Type: Subsidiary
- Industry: Retail
- Founded: 1908
- Founder: Edward Filene
- Defunct: 2011 (as a retailer)
- Headquarters: Burlington, Massachusetts, U.S.
- Number of locations: 20 stand-alone stores, 7 Syms & Filene's Basement
- Key people: Mark Shulman, President; James Rudd, Executive Vice President
- Products: Apparel, beauty products, jewelry, shoes, accessories and home goods.
- Net income: $389.3 million
- Parent: Syms
- Website: www.filenesbasement.com

Filene's Basement, also called The Basement, was a Massachusetts-based chain of department stores which was owned by Retail Ventures, Inc. until April 2009 when it was sold to Syms.

Founded in 1909 and one of the oldest off-price retailers in the United States, Filene's Basement focused on high-end goods and was known for its distinctive, low-technology automatic markdown system. As of late 2006, the company operated stores in metropolitan areas in eight U.S. states and Washington, D.C. and used a 470,000-square-foot (44,000 m^{2}) distribution center in Auburn, Massachusetts. The store's name was derived from the subterranean location of its flagship store, in the basement of the former Filene's department store at Downtown Crossing in Boston, Massachusetts. The flagship Downtown Crossing store closed in September 2007 while the building above it underwent construction and had been set to reopen following the conclusion of the construction.

The 2009 economic crisis negatively impacted the chain, prompting the closing of many stores and the eventual sale of the chain from Retail Ventures, Inc. to Buxbaum Group, which filed for bankruptcy in May 2009. Filene's Basement was then sold to Syms Corporation, which also owns the Syms chain of off-price stores. In November 2011, Syms filed for bankruptcy, resulting in a liquidation sale. The last Filene's Basement stores closed permanently on December 29, 2011. In 2012, private equity firm Trinity Place Holdings acquired the rights to the Filene's Basement name. In the fall of 2015, Filene's Basement was resurrected as an online retailer.

== History ==
The history of Filene's Basement is intertwined with that of the venerable Filene's chain. In 1908, Edward A. Filene, son of the founder of Filene's, William Filene, came up with the idea of selling surplus, overstock, and closeout merchandise in the basement of his father's store. Filene's "Automatic Bargain Basement", as it was originally called, opened in 1909 beneath the Downtown Crossing location.

Filene's Basement, and its sister company, Filene's Department Store, were wholly owned by Federated Department Stores of Cincinnati. The two entities shared many operating systems, including payroll, benefits, and a common credit card. Top executives, at the time, included: Sam DiPhillippo (Marketing), Audie Dunham and Kathleen Collman (HR).

Following the ill-fated acquisition of Federated by Campeau Corporation of Ottawa, Filene's Basement was spun off. It became a privately held venture in a LBO arrangement led by then-CEO & President Jim Anathan, Chairman Sam Gerson, and other investors. The entity became known as "Filene's Basement, Inc." and remained headquartered in Wellesley, Massachusetts.

In April 1988, Filene's was purchased and acquired by May Department Stores, and the fortunes of the stores diverged. Filene's Basement, now a separate company, embarked on a massive but ill-advised strategy of expansion that, ten years later, in August 1999, forced the chain to seek Chapter 11 bankruptcy protection; more than 30 outlets were shuttered. Filene's Basement's journey through the bankruptcy process was brief, and expansion soon resumed, albeit more cautiously.

In March 1999, the company debuted a new weekend warehouse store concept, Aisle 3. The stores, averaging 60,000 square feet (5,600 m^{2}), operated only Friday through Sunday and were located near major metropolitan areas. Plans were to open at least 10 stores by the end of 1999 and 40 to 50 stores in the following years, but ultimately only eight opened. All Aisle 3 location were closed following the purchase of Filene's Basement by Value City Department Stores Inc. (later Retail Ventures, Inc.) in March 2000. Soon afterward, three Filene's Basement locations reopened in the vicinity of Washington, D.C., and modest efforts at expansion resumed.

In 2006, Federated Department Stores repurchased the original Filene's chain. Because many store locations between the two chains did not overlap, most Filene's locations were spared and reopened as Macy's, but the flagship location (which sat across the street from an existing Macy's store) was not. Macy's shuttered the Filene's in Boston's Downtown Crossing, directly above the flagship Filene's Basement location, and sold the building for redevelopment. That Filene's Basement location was subsequently closed on September 3, 2007, to accommodate the redevelopment project.

At the time, plans were announced to reopen Filene's Basement in the same location in 2009 (although the announcement also claimed there was no legal obligation to do so). Boston Mayor Tom Menino expressed concern that the chain was not able to find a temporary location for the store during the two-year renovation, saying they "could have found a location in the city if they really wanted to continue the business." However, Filene's Basement had already opened a second Boston store in 2006, one mile away from the flagship store, on Boylston Street near Copley Square. Due to a number of factors, renovations on the Downtown Crossing site came to a halt during late 2008, leaving the building partially gutted; as 2009 came to a close, Filene's Basement had not moved back into their former space, as originally planned.

=== Bankruptcy and sale ===
The economic crisis took its toll on the chain, and owner Retail Ventures, Inc announced on January 20, 2009, its plans to close 11 of the chain's 36 stores. The store closures did not help, and on April 22, 2009, Retail Ventures, Inc. announced that it had sold the remaining 25 Filene's Basement stores to the Buxbaum Group, a company that specializes in liquidations. The Buxbaum Group did not indicate what it would do with its acquisition, although Retail Ventures had previously indicated that the company's future was uncertain. The store officially filed for Chapter 11 bankruptcy protection on May 4, while real estate investors Crown Acquisitions and the Chetrit Group offered $22 million to purchase the name and leases on 17 of Filene's Basement's most profitable stores. They announced that they would keep the stores open and focus on castoffs from luxury-goods makers. On June 15, 2009 Syms and Vornado were declared the winners of the bankruptcy auction of Filene's Basement's assets when the Syms-Vornado group agreed to pay 62.4 million dollars, subject to bankruptcy court approval.

=== Post-closure and relaunch ===
Filene's Basement and parent company Syms Corporation posted messages on their respective websites thanking customers for their continued support, stating that although their stores are currently closed, they expect their famous brands to continue on. They encouraged people to leave their personal information in order to be informed of any future relaunch. They also provided information on how to purchase rights to the company's brands, trademarks, and other intangible assets and erected a website to view the bankruptcy case and pertinent phone numbers. In January 2015, a new website was posted on www.filenesbasement.com encouraging people to sign up for information leading to a possible relaunch. As of mid-February, items are for sale on the site. As of January 1, 2021, no items are offered for sale on the website and "under construction" is prominently displayed on the landing page.

=== Documentary ===
A documentary film, titled Voices from the Basement and in the works since 2004, aired on WGBH-TV Boston on December 9, 2010. The film features stories from the people who worked and shopped in The Basement and include former Massachusetts Governor Michael Dukakis, congressman Barney Frank, Mayor Tom Menino, Estelle Parsons, and Mike Wallace. The film is the work of filmmakers Michael Bavaro and Susan Edbril premiered at the Omni Parker House in Boston.

== Store features and events ==
=== The automatic markdown system ===
A description of The Basement's markdown system from a 1982 New York Times article:

"... every article is marked with a tag showing the price and the date the article was first put on sale. Twelve days later, if it has not been sold, it is reduced by 25 percent. Six selling days later, it is cut by 50 percent and after an additional six days, it is offered at 75 percent off the original price. After six more days—or a total of 30—if it is not sold, it is given to charity."

Ninety percent of goods sold in the basement were purchased within the first 12 days of sale.

In January 2004, the automatic markdown system was changed to require 14 days between each mark-down.

The markdown system was only in effect at the Downtown Crossing store and was not extended to any of the chain's other stores, even after the Downtown Crossing store closed in 2007.

=== Running of the Brides ===
Starting in 1947, the Boston flagship store held an annual one-day bridal gown sale. In 1997, the sale was the subject of a study by two marketing professors at Bentley College, subsequently published in an article in Developments in Marketing Science.

In 2008, after the flagship store had closed, the event moved to the Hynes Convention Center. Filene's Basement stores in other cities have also held these events.

== See also ==
- List of defunct department stores of the United States
