= Downtown Crossing =

Shopping district in Boston, Massachusetts

Coordinates: 42.355450°N 71.060460°W

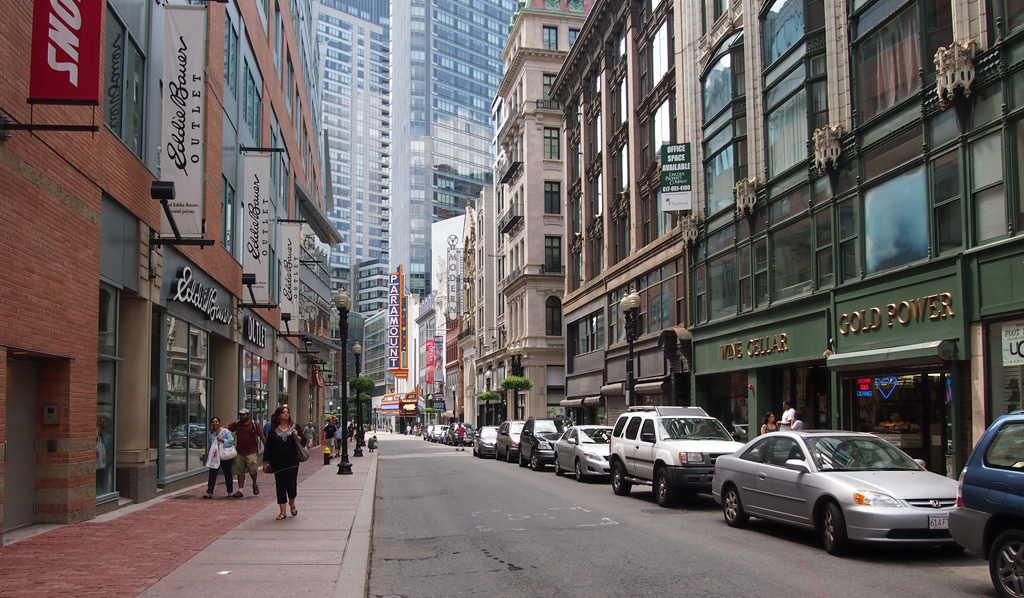
Washington Street, Downtown Crossing

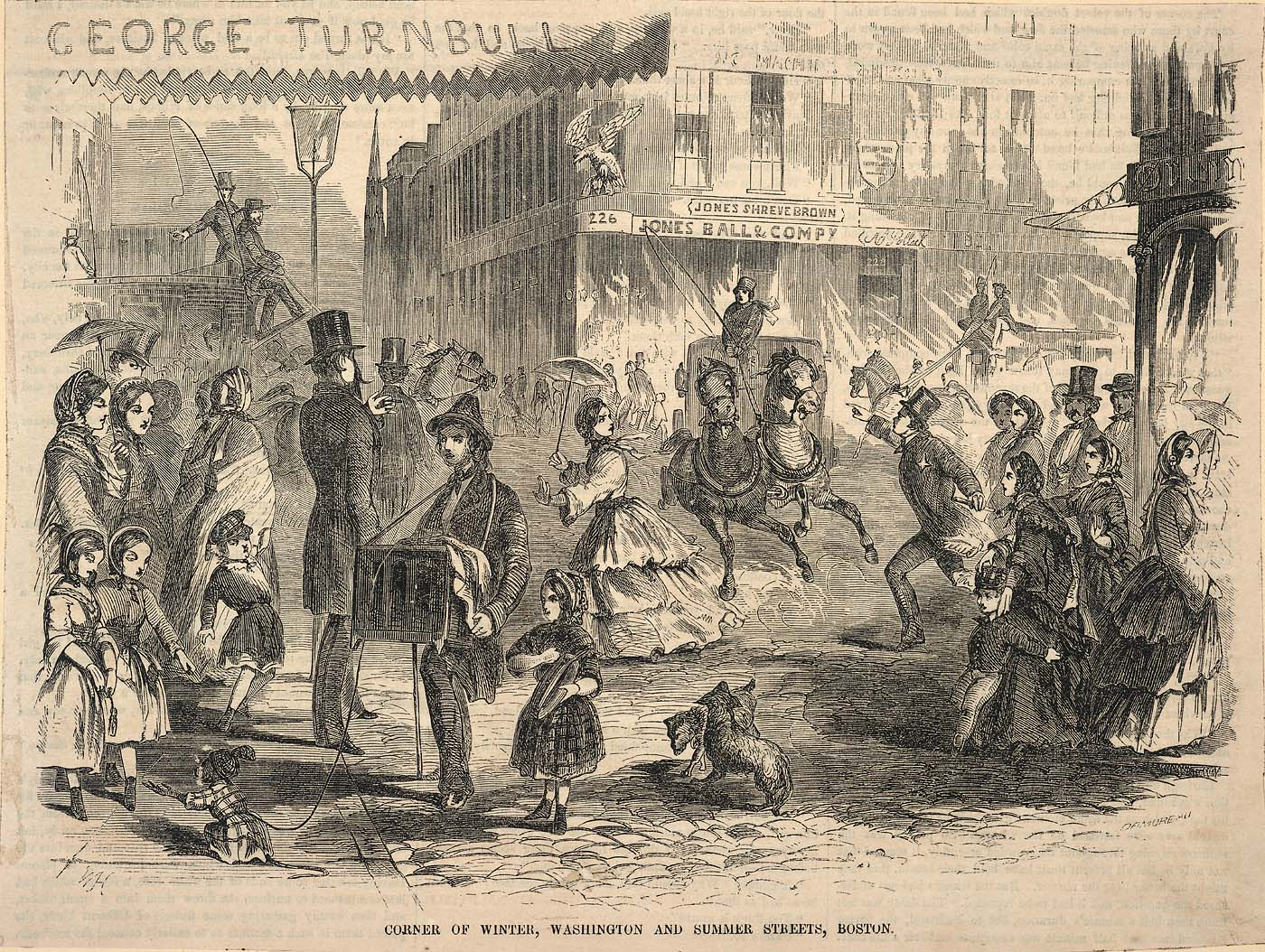
Intersection of Washington Street, Summer Street and Winter Street, 1857 (engraving by Winslow Homer

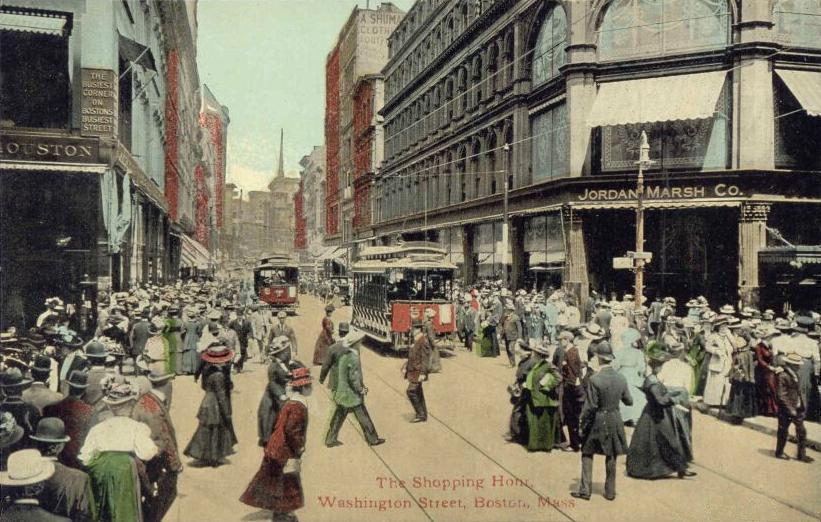
Downtown Crossing, c. 1910

Washington Street seen from Summer Street intersection, with Old South Meeting House visible in background (2026)

Downtown Crossing is a shopping district within Downtown Boston, Massachusetts, located east of Boston Common, west of the Financial District, south of Government Center, and north of Chinatown and the old Combat Zone. It features large department stores as well as restaurants, souvenir sellers, general retail establishments, and street vendors. MBTA's Downtown Crossing station lies in the center of the district.

The district gets its name from the intersection of Washington Street with Winter and Summer Streets. Historically, the district was anchored by two department stores, Jordan Marsh and Filene's which stood opposite each other at the intersection. While both stores have since been bought by other chains and no longer exist, the district continues to be a major pedestrian shopping area, with the area of Washington, Winter, and Summer streets surrounding the intersection closed to most vehicular traffic; pedestrians may walk freely in the street.

== History ==
=== 18th and 19th centuries ===
In the late 18th and early 19th centuries, Summer Street was an upscale neighborhood, with townhouses designed by Charles Bulfinch and others. The Great Boston Fire of 1872 destroyed much of the neighborhood, especially between Summer, Washington, and Milk Streets.

=== 20th century ===
Since the early 1900s, the area along Washington and Tremont Streets, roughly from School Street to Beach Street, has also been referred to as the Ladder District. The side streets between the two main thoroughfares look like the rungs of a ladder when viewed on a map, hence the name.

==== Department stores ====
Between 1895 and 1917, Downtown Crossing became the hub of department store shopping in Boston. In 1841, Eben Jordan and Benjamin L. Marsh opened the first Jordan Marsh store as wholesalers, which later grew into a retail department store. Another major store, Filene's, was founded in 1881. Originally known as William Filene's Sons Co. the store expanded, opening the "Automatic Bargain Basement" in 1909. Gilchrist and Kennedy's also opened in the neighborhood, though both are now defunct. These stores attracted more middle-class visitors, including those from the suburbs, and anchored other retail services, including food and restaurants.

Nationwide, downtown department stores faced challenges after World War II due to suburbanization and competition from big box stores.

Filene's Basement would go on to become a major department store independent of Filene's. The flagship store of Filene's Basement was located underground, in the basement of the former Filene's department store. The two stores, formerly under the same ownership, were disassociated in 1988. The building housing the two stores was added to the National Register of Historic Places in 1986.

During the winter season, Filene's held a Christmas tree lighting and Jordan Marsh would present a series festive Christmas window displays known as the "Enchanted Village". The window display has since relocated to Boston's Hynes Convention Center, and then to City Hall Plaza.

=== Redevelopment ===
Following the success of the Faneuil Hall Marketplace, Boston decided to redevelop the Washington Street area into a pedestrian-only mall, which was unveiled in 1979. At first, foot traffic and business in the area declined, but it slowly returned as the popularity of the mall as a shopping area increased, helped along by a cart vending program.

The area is experiencing more growth due to new luxury hotel and condominium additions. In 2013, Millennium Place was completed. The luxury towers rise to 38 stories (475 feet) and 36 stories (446 feet).

In 1996, the former Jordan Marsh store became Macy's, and in early 2006 the Filene's landmark flagship store was closed. In 2006, Vornado Realty Trust announced the purchase of the former Filenes site for $100m. The project is expected to cost around $620 million and the project would be filled with upscale shopping destinations, high-dollar business space, and tony residences. The plan calls for a 38-story tower that will rise to 495 feet. However, the vacancy left by Filene's has left the building to be redeveloped. Filene's Basement has been closed for the duration of construction, but has vowed to return upon the completion of construction.

Filene's Basement filed for bankruptcy protection on Monday May 4, 2009. New York's Crown Acquisitions, with the Chetrit Group as its partner has made a bid to buy 17 of Filene's 25 locations including the Downtown Crossing location. Although construction has stalled on the Downtown Crossing project, the store is still slated to reopen in the future. The Downtown Crossing location accounted for 13% of the company's sales. Vornado Realty Trust had been paying Filene's $500,000 a month in compensation for closing their Downtown Crossing store. These payments stopped without notice in January 2009.

In 2010, the Downtown Boston Business Improvement District was initiated to revive an ailing Downtown Crossing. In 2015, the historic Burnham Building (see Filene's Department Store) where Filene's flagship previously resided became occupied by Havas and Arnold Worldwide on its upper floors. In the second half of 2015, supermarket Roche Bros. and Primark, an Irish clothing retailer, opened to occupy the ground floor of the Burnham Building.

=== Suffolk University expansion ===
In 2007 Suffolk University bought a building on West Street that was being renovated into condominiums, and converted it into a student dormitory capable of housing about 270 students.

In 2010, Suffolk University renovated and restored the historical Modern Theatre and built a ten-story dormitory on top of the theater. The building is now an expansion to the original 10 West Street building and houses an additional 200 students.

== Other points of interest ==
A plaque on the Macy's building marks the location of the first mint in the British colonies, established by John Hull in 1652.

The MBTA's Downtown Crossing subway station directly serves Downtown Crossing. The State Street and Park Street stations are within close walking distance. Silver Line service is also available.

A small mall called Lafayette Place Mall was attached to the Jordan Marsh store in 1985; by 1992 the mall was closed and has since been converted to offices. The Corner Mall in the former Gilchrist's department store building now services the public with a large food court and several small retail stores.

The Boston Irish Famine Memorial is located on the corner of School Street and Washington Street.
