= Arnold Worldwide =

American advertising agency

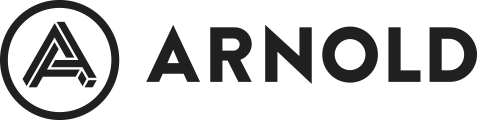
- Industry: Advertising agency
- Founded: 1946
- Headquarters: Boston, Massachusetts, U.S.
- Area served: Worldwide
- Key people: George Sargent (CEO), Sean McBride (Chief Creative Officer), Bre Rossetti (Chief Strategy Officer), and Val Bettini (Chief Client Officer)
- Products: Full service advertising agency
- Number of employees: 250+
- Parent: Havas
- Website: http://arn.com/

Arnold Worldwide is a full service advertising agency headquartered in Boston, Massachusetts. The agency is a part of the Havas Creative Group, a global advertising holding company based in France. Some of Arnold’s clients include Progressive Insurance, De Beers, PNC Bank, ADP, Maxfli, Toast and Norwegian Cruise Line.

== History ==
Arnold Rosoff founded the company in 1946. Upon retirement in 1986, Rosoff sold the agency to his employees. Ed Eskandarian, a former partial-owner of the Boston Red Sox, acquired the agency in 1990 and grew Arnold "through about a dozen acquisitions". One of the most notable deals was the acquisition of Emerson Lane Fortuna, an advertising agency with annual billings of $20 million. Eskandarian sold the agency to Snyder Communications in 1995, and Havas acquired Snyder Communications and Arnold in 2000. Eskandarian retired at the end of 2010.

In 2005, Advertising Age ranked Arnold as the 19th largest American agency with revenues of $114m. A year later, Advertising Age listed Arnold Worldwide as the 28th largest American agency with revenues of just under $90m. According to Adweek, Arnold Worldwide's revenue in 2009 was estimated at $235m.

After struggling to gain accounts earlier in the year, Arnold Worldwide won the Panasonic account at the end of 2009. The agency hired Andrew Benett as CEO in February 2010 and had won eighteen new client accounts by the end of the year, earning them the “2010 Comeback Agency of the Year” title from Ad Age. In 2011, Ad Age chose Arnold as one of 10 agencies to be included on its annual Agency A-List. The Delaney Report, an industry newsletter, declared Arnold Worldwide "Best Ad Agency in the Nation" for the third quarter of 2010 as a result of their "strong new business track record."

In December 2013, Pam Hamlin was named global president of Arnold Worldwide, after having served as president of Arnold's Boston office since 2006.

January 2015, Jim Elliott was named Global Chief Creative Officer, after having served as CCO of Y&R New York.

August 2017, Icaro Doria was named Global Chief Creative Officer, after having served as CCO of DDB New York.

In June 2018, it was announced that Kiran Smith, former marketing chief of Brookstone, would replace Hamlin as CEO.

December 2019, George Sargent, President of Havas Media Boston, was appointed CEO of Arnold Worldwide with Sean McBride assuming the role of Chief Creative Officer.

As part of a larger restructuring, Bre Rossetti was promoted to Chief Strategy Officer and Vallerie Bettini to Chief Client Officer. In October 2023, veteran advertising executive Andrew Arnot was hired as Managing Director, focusing on the Progressive Insurance account. Most recently, Sarah Taylor was named Managing Director, and will continue to lead the PNC Bank while expanding her influence across Arnold's marketing team.

== Advertiser 115 ==
Branding agency Teen
