= Nicole Farb =

American entrepreneur and business executive

Nicole Shariat Farb
- Education: Booth School of Business
- Years active: 2013 - current
- Known for: Co-founder, CEO, Darby Smart
- Spouse: Michael Farb
- Children: 2

Nicole Shariat Farb is an American entrepreneur and business executive. She is a co-founder and the chief executive officer of the video community Darby Smart. Prior to founding the company, Farb worked as a Head of Emerging Private Companies at Goldman Sachs. Farb has also appeared several times on Good Morning America as a DIY expert. She is also active in pursuing diversity and equality in the tech industry.

== Early life and education ==
Farb was raised in Orange County, California. When she was 10 years old, she started a business making and selling hair bows. After graduating high school she briefly pursued a career in acting, before studying journalism at Loyola University. After Loyola, she received her Master's in Education from University of California, Irvine and worked as a teacher before attending business school at the University of Chicago Booth School of Business.

== Career ==
Farb relocated to San Francisco, California and began working for Goldman Sachs where she was a vice president. After experiencing frustration while crafting thank you cards following her 2011 wedding, she left Goldman Sachs to start Darby Smart.

She recruited software engineer, Karl Mendes, as a co-founder and raised a $1 million seed round of funding. Darby Smart was launched in June 2013. In Spring 2014, Darby Smart raised an additional $6.3 million in Series A funding led by Maveron.

Farb led the company into a partnership with Urban Outfitters in Fall 2014. In 2015, she formed a partnership with the craft retailer Michael's. By 2016, Farb had launched the Darby Smart app which helps users create videos.

Farb has been vocal about diversity and inclusion issues in the tech industry, and was quoted in Emily Chang's 2018 book, Brotopia about her experience as a female entrepreneur in Silicon Valley.

In 2018, Darby Smart was acquired by Grove Collaborative, and Nicole Farb joined the company's beauty venture.

== Personal life ==
Farb married Michael Farb, the co-founder of sports recruiting software company CaptainU, in 2011. The couple met while attending the Booth School of Business and have twin boys.
