= Bro culture =

Subculture of young men

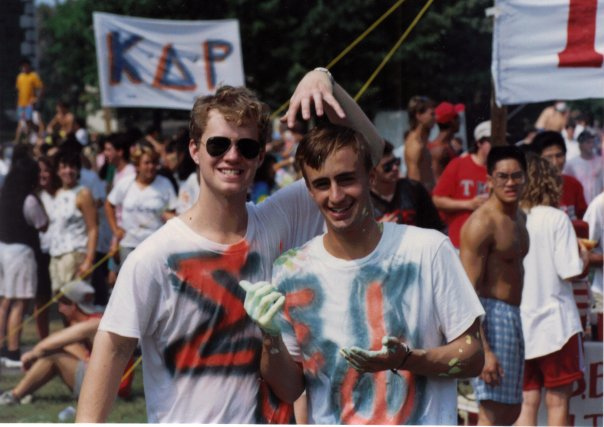
Fraternity brothers are commonly associated with bro culture.

Bro culture is a North American subculture of young people (originally young men, hence "brother culture") who spend time partying with others like themselves. Although the original image of the bro lifestyle is associated with sports apparel and fraternities, it lacks a consistent definition. Most aspects vary regionally, such as in California, where it overlaps with surf culture. It often refers to a culture of machismo but sometimes also a darker hypermasculinity, including binge drinking, sexism, and rape culture. Oxford Dictionaries have noted that bros frequently self-identify with neologisms containing the word "bro" as a prefix or suffix.

== Etymology and history ==
The term bro originated as an abbreviated form of brother. According to the Oxford English Dictionary, it is first attested in A Treatise on Charitie (published 1533), written by humanist scholar Thomas Lupset. It began to assume non-familial connotations in the 20th century. In this evolution, it was first used to refer to another man, such as a "guy" or "fellow". In these ways, it was semantically similar to the use of "brother". In the 1970s, bro came to refer to a male friend rather than just another man. The word became associated with young men who spend time partying with others like themselves. Oxford Dictionaries identified the use of the term "bro" as the one "defining feature" of the changing cultural attributes of young manhood. Other variations exist such as brah, breh, bruh (African American Vernacular English). The British English bruv, derived from "bruvver", dates from the 1970s.

The applications of bro subculture correlate with neologisms that include the word. The word is used as a modifier for compound terms such as "brogrammer" and "curlbro". Oxford Dictionaries wrote that the term "lends itself" to compounding and blending, with combinations such as "bro-hug" and "bro-step" and portmanteaux such as "bro-down", "bromance", and "brohemian". This creation of neologisms was called "portmanbros" by 2009. Oxford compared this trend to man- prefixes (e.g., man cave, mansplaining, manscaping) but noted that the bro portmanteaux subset refers to a smaller portion of masculinity, noting that many of the terms were "stunt coinages" with little hope of widespread adoption. However, the term "bromance", whose first usage was recorded in a 2001 issue of TransWorld Surf, entered the Oxford English Dictionary. The term "bro-hug" was used at least eight times in The New York Times between 2010 and 2013 and "brogrammer" once became the center of Silicon Valley gender conversations. In comparison to the "hipster" modifier, Oxford Dictionaries called the "bro" modifier more playful, and responsible for making the subculture "ripe for (often self-inflicted) mockery".

== Characteristics ==
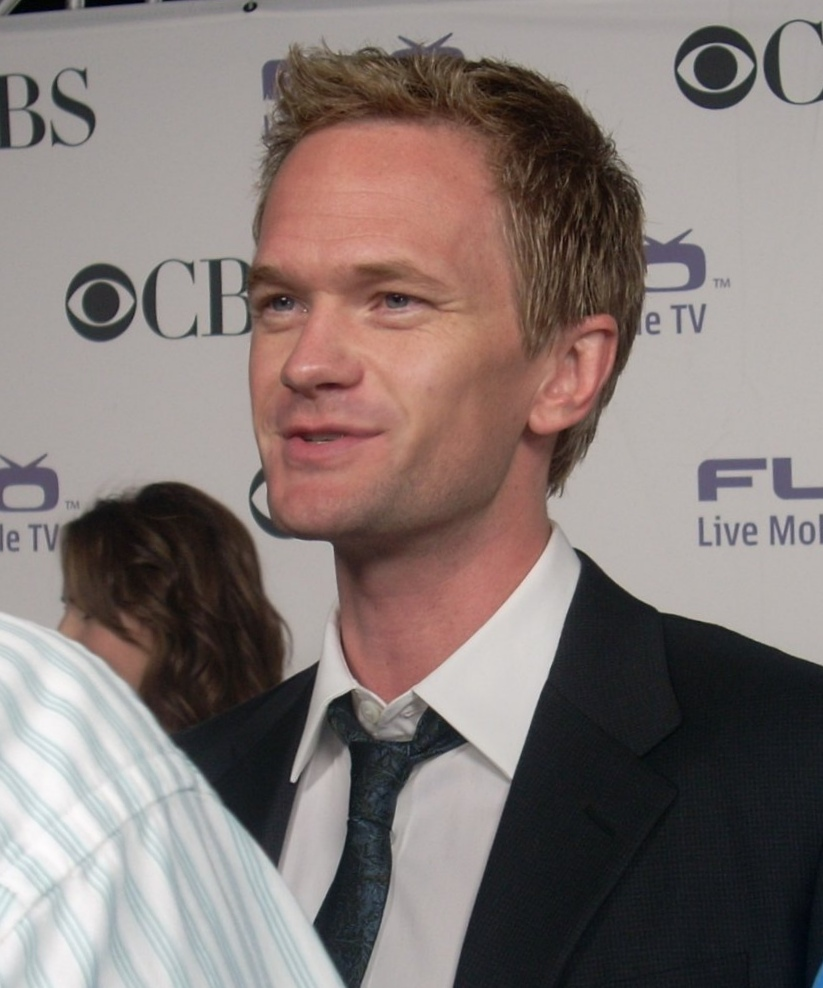
Neil Patrick Harris, known for playing bro character Barney Stinson

Bro culture is not defined consistently or concretely. However, it typically refers to a type of "fratty masculinity," predominantly white, and is associated with frayed-brim baseball hats, oxford shirts, sports team T-shirts, and boat shoes or sandals. NPR noted that bros could include people of color and women.

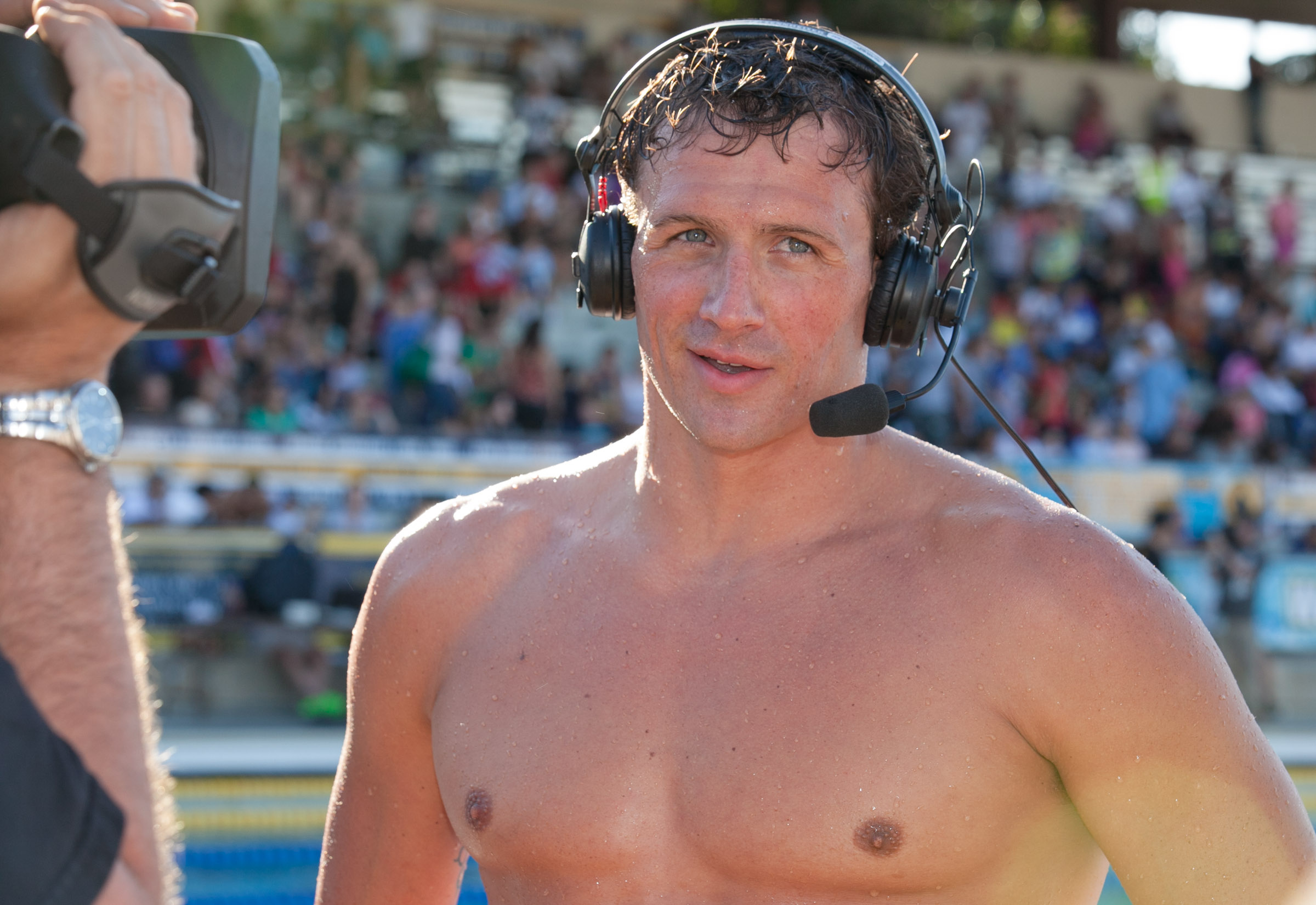
Ryan Lochte was named as the "platonic ideal of bro-dom" in 2013.

NPR identified four types of bros: dudely, jockish, preppy, and stoner-ish. In their description, dudely bros form close homosocial friendships in a group, jockish bros are defined by ability at team sports tempered by interest in alcohol, preppy bros wear "conservatively casual" clothes such as Abercrombie and Fitch and flaunt "social privilege", and stoner-ish bros may or may not use cannabis but speak in a relaxed fashion and exude the air of surfers. The gay community on Reddit has coined the term "gaybro" to refer to gay men who exhibit bro characteristics in defiance of the usual stereotypes of gay male behavior.

Oxford Dictionaries identify bros as those who use the word to refer to others, such as in the example of "don't tase me, bro", in which the taserer is not a bro, but the tased is. Oxford also recognized Neil Patrick Harris' character Barney Stinson on the sitcom How I Met Your Mother as "the quintessence of a certain iteration of the contemporary bro," noting how his language uses the word liberally. A survey from NPR's Codeswitch blog named popular figures such as Matthew McConaughey, Brody Jenner, Joe Rogan, Dane Cook, and John Mayer as representative of bro subculture, with Ryan Lochte as their "platonic ideal of bro-dom".

=== "Bro code" ===
In popular culture, the Bro Code is a friendship etiquette to be followed among men or, more specifically, among members of the bro subculture.

The notion of an unwritten set of rules that govern the relationship between straight male friends is present in modern American popular culture at least since 1991. In the Seinfeld episode "The Stranded", which aired on November 27 that year, Jerry Seinfeld says the following monologue, in one of his stand-up bits:

All plans between men are tentative. If one man should suddenly have an opportunity to pursue a woman, it's like these two guys never met each other ever in life. This is the male code. And it doesn't matter how important the arrangements are. I mean, most of the time they scrub a space shuttle mission, it's because one of the astronauts met someone on his way to the launch pad. They hold that countdown. He's leaning against the rocket, talking to her, "So listen, when I get back, what do you say we get together for some Tang?"

— Jerry Seinfeld, in The Stranded (Seinfeld)

USA Today mentions a "bro code" found online, with 128 points. These include: "A Bro never rents a chick flick", "A Bro never cries" and "When a Bro wants to do something stupid, you film it", and (#58) "Bros don't break up chick fights until a sufficient amount of clothing has been pulled off."

=== Lacrosse bro (Lax Bro) ===
Lax bro subculture is defined as a laid-back ("chill") lifestyle associated with lacrosse. The bounds of the subculture are loose, but its character traits include "understated confidence that critics call arrogance", long hair known as "lettuce," colorful board shorts, flat-brim baseball hats, and colorful half-calf socks. The bands O.A.R., Dispatch, and Dave Matthews Band are associated with lax bros. Typical lax bro attitude and style are common in middle schools and universities according to a 2012 report in The Boston Globe. Enthusiasts praise the subculture's sense of identity and popularization of a sport indigenous to the United States, while detractors take issue with the "preppie/frat boy image that glorifies elitism and wealth, and values flash over hard work".

=== Tech bro ===
The phenomenon of the tech bro, or brogrammer, sees bro culture take root in the technology industry. The term is almost always applied pejoratively, generally in reference to a workplace culture that undervalues people who do not fit into the bro lifestyle, particularly women. Brogrammer culture can be contrasted with geek culture, which is said to value ability and passion over image.

In 2013, former Microsoft game designer Daniel Cook wrote that the company was responsible for developing the bro subculture within video gaming, explaining that the "Xbox put machismo, ultra-violence and chimpboys with backwards caps in the spotlight. [...] Gamers were handed a pre-packaged group identity via the propaganda machine of a mega corporation." Cook writes that Microsoft has done this in order to distance the Xbox from its console competitors, which were portrayed as "kids platform[s]".

=== Gym bro ===
Gym bros (also known as 'gym rats') are a subgroup of the bro culture who are often defined as being obsessed with the gym (and fitness in general), stereotyped for centering their personality around the gym, including but not limited to: having strict nutrition and training routines, taking a multitude of dietary supplements (such as creatine, protein powder, pre-workout or omega-3), and wearing sleeveless shirts.

The gym bro culture has risen considerably beginning the 2020s decade, with a great influence caused by social media and the goal of achieving physiques often unattainable without the use of performance enhancing drugs, which promotes unrealistic expectations for less experienced people.

== Criticism and news media portrayal ==
Since 2013, the term has been adopted by feminists and the media to refer to a misogynist culture within an organization or community. In a New York Magazine article in September 2013, Ann Friedman wrote: "Bro once meant something specific: a self-absorbed young white guy in board shorts with a taste for cheap beer. But it’s become a shorthand for the sort of privileged ignorance that thrives in groups dominated by wealthy, white, straight men." Vox referred to Silicon Valley's "bro culture problem" in its review of Emily Chang's book Brotopia. In 2014 and 2017, Inc published articles on bro culture in business.

In its coverage of the 2019 Telegramgate scandal, in which investigative journalists published text messages written by the governor of Puerto Rico, The New York Times referred to "an arrogant 'bro' culture of elites who joked about making chumps out of even their own supporters."

The term Bernie Bro, an epithet directed at supporters of Bernie Sanders has been criticized as a reductive smear tactic used by political opponents. The term was widely used because the concept of "bro" itself was vague.

== See also ==
- Bro-country
- Bromance
- Dude
- Fratire
- Lad culture
