= Emily Chang =

Emily Chang may refer to:

- Emily Chang (actress) (born 1980), American actress
- Emily Chang (journalist) (born 1980), American journalist
