= The Michaels Companies =

Holding company based in Irving, Texas

The Michaels Companies, Inc.
- Type: Private
- Traded as: Nasdaq: MIK
- Industry: Retail; wholesale
- Founded: 2014; 12 years ago
- Founder: Michael J. Dupey
- Headquarters: Irving, Texas, U.S.
- Number of locations: 1,252 (US, Canada) (January 2021)
- Key people: David Boone (CEO)
- Services: Merchandise for makers and do-it-yourself home decorators
- Revenue: ▲US$5.271 billion (2020)
- Operating income: ▲US$533.54 million (2020)
- Net income: ▲US$294.9 million (2020)
- Total assets: ▲US$4.528 billion (2020)
- Total equity: ▲US$−1.197 billion (2020)
- Owner: Apollo Global Management
- Number of employees: 45,000 (2019)
- Subsidiaries: Michaels; Artistree; Aaron Brothers Custom Framing
- Website: The Michaels Companies

The Michaels Companies, Inc. is an American retail holding company, headquartered in Irving, Texas. It was formed as a parent company of Michaels in 2014. As of 2021, The Michaels Companies operates its flagship brand, Michaels (in the United States and Canada), and Artistree, a manufacturer of custom and specialty framing merchandise. There are over 1,252 arts and crafts stores located in the United States and Canada.

== History ==
The Michaels Companies debuted in June 2014 on the NASDAQ under the symbol MIK and raised about $472 million in its initial public offering, using the funds to pay down debt. The IPO valued the company at $3.45 billion. In April 2015, Rubin was named chairman, in addition to his title of CEO. In August 2015, Michaels announced a partnership with online DIY craft design and video company Darby Smart aimed at "making crafting simpler and more accessible." In February 2016, the Michaels Companies inc. completed the acquisition of Lamrite West, Inc., which included an international wholesale business under the Darice brand name ("Darice") and 36 arts and crafts retail stores located primarily in the Midwest under the Pat Catan's brand name. In August, The Michaels Companies acquired Hancock Fabrics' intellectual property and customer database as part of its bankruptcy and liquidation. In June 2017, The Michaels Companies became a Fortune 500 company. In Fall, Michaels launched a relationship with Elizabeth Jean "Busy" Philipps in fall 2017, resulting in a digital video series called The Make Off, in which Busy competes in a crafting competition against other celebrities. In 2018, The Make Off series was nominated for a Webby Award. That year the company also embarked on media partnerships with Good Morning America and Nickelodeon around the concept of promoting screen-free activities for children and teens. In March 2018, the Michaels companies announced its partnership with TV design personalities Drew and Jonathan Scott of HGTV's Property Brothers for a custom frame collection. In January 2019, the Michaels companies announced the closure of the Pat Catan Stores, a dozen or more of which were to be reopened under the Michaels Stores name. In October 2019, Mark Cosby was named CEO of the Michaels Companies after being named interim CEO in February 2019. In November 2019, The Michaels Companies, Inc. announced that they would reopen up to 40 A.C. Moore stores as Michaels stores after A.C. Moore's bankruptcy and liquidation. In January 2020, former Walmart merchandising executive Ashley Buchanan joined The Michaels Companies as the chief executive officer and a member of the board of directors. In July, the company downsized its headquarters but remained in Irving, Texas. On March 3, 2021, The Michaels Companies management agreed to be acquired by venture capital firm Apollo Global Management for $22 per share, or $3.3 billion, and the company was to be taken private. In April, Apollo announced in a press release that the acquisition was completed. The Michaels Companies owns Artistree, a vertically integrated custom framing business that manufactures precut mats and framing merchandise for Michaels Stores and online ordering. Custom framing orders are processed and shipped to a Michaels store where the frame is assembled and picked up by the customer.
