= Shopper's World =

- Location: Framingham, Massachusetts, United States
- Coordinates: 42.302071°N 71.395083°W
- Address: 1 Worcester Road
- Opened: October 4, 1951; 75 years ago (Original); 1995 (Rebuilt)
- Closed: August 1994 (Original)
- Owner: Urban Edge Properties
- Num. of stores: 26
- Floor area: 781,507 ft^{2} (72,604 m^{2})
- Floors: 1
- Website: shoppersworldma.com

Shopper's World is an open-air shopping center in Framingham, Massachusetts. The original facility (spelled Shoppers' World) is of historical significance as one of the first suburban shopping malls in the United States upon opening in 1951; though it had a central courtyard and covered walkways, it was not fully indoor. The original structure was demolished and replaced by the current open-air facility in 1994. The retail park, with the adjacent Natick Mall in Natick, are major components of the Golden Triangle shopping district in the center of MetroWest, situated between Route 9 and Route 30.

== History and layout ==
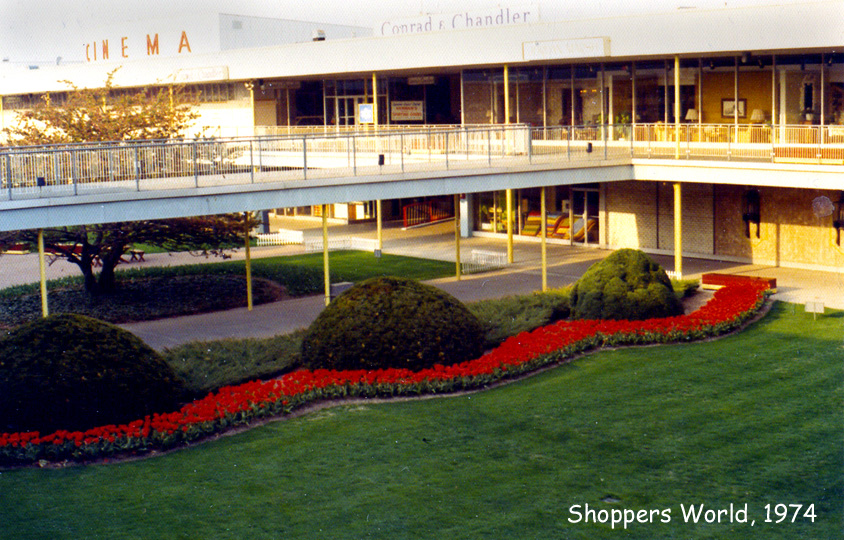
Shoppers' World in early 1974

One of the earliest suburban shopping malls in the United States, Shoppers' World (spelled with an apostrophe and possessive "s" in the plural form) opened on October 4, 1951, with 44 stores. 25,000 people and State Treasurer John E. Hurley attended the opening. This futuristic concept mall was designed to be the mecca of suburban shopping between Boston and Worcester, as the area around its original property remains today.

At the time the term "mall" was not yet in use as a term for an enclosed shopping center, but articles about the center spoke of its "mall", in the original sense of "promenade" or "walkway", along which the stores were arranged.

The large Jordan Marsh dome on the southern end was the sole anchor store for the mall in the earliest days. The dome was visible from the air and was used on aeronautical charts as a visual reporting point for aircraft approaching Boston's Logan Airport. It was reputed to be the third largest (in diameter) unsupported dome in the world after St. Peter's Basilica in Rome and St. Paul's Cathedral in London.

There were two long, flanking 675-foot (206 m) two-level wings separated by a 100-foot (30 m) two-story open courtyard mall surrounded by large, open parking lots.

The original design included a multipurpose theater at one end of the mall. Originally called The Cinema, the house contained a large orchestra seating section, a balcony, and a full stage with a fly area for curtain, scenery, and lighting grid. Early stage crews at The Cinema are credited with coining the now-standard industry term Best Boy to describe an assistant to the chief electrician. In addition to movies, in the 1950s the theater was the site of many live summer theater productions such as Tennessee Williams's The Glass Menagerie and George Abbott and John Cecil Holm's Three Men on a Horse. It was the first movie theater in the country to take advantage of the mall parking lots to provide ample parking during evening hours. In later years, The Cinema became strictly a movie house under the ownership of General Cinema. The Cinema would add a second theater in 1963, and two more in 1974. In the mid-1970s, the first two auditoriums were split in half, bringing the Cinema to a total of 6 screens.

As the mall grew, it eventually took the shape of many newer malls but remained roofless.

The mall's layout consisted of a two-level, open-middle, long rectangle shape. However, by having no main roof over the central mall area, customers had to walk outside to get from store to store. To keep people from getting wet in the rain and snow, the mall management covered the perimeter walkways by extending the roof line of the stores all the way around the mall. The lower walkway was covered by the top walkway. To walk between levels, shoppers used three large 20-foot (6 m), wide, paved, covered ramps placed so customers were never too far from one. Kids often ran up and down them (away from consenting parents) as well as rode bikes and skateboards.

Throughout the years, the courtyard area always had several areas of interest and events going on. The southern end contained a permanent water fountain with synchronized colored lights and a garden area with seasonal plantings of flowers, picnic tables, and sun umbrellas. In the 1950s, several kiddie rides including a small Ferris wheel, merry-go-round, and a boat ride were in the north end of the courtyard. In 1961, a Stop & Shop grocery store was built at the northwest side of the mall. The store was eventually replaced in the late 1970s by a Toys 'R Us, which remained a tenant until the entire chain was shuttered in 2018.

During the holidays, the mall put up decorations that included several giant wooden soldiers around the inner concourse, and artistic flower arrangements and banners. Santa Claus appeared with live reindeer in the courtyard in front of Jordan Marsh Basement Store every Christmas. In the early 1950s, an Easter egg hunt was held, but the practice was abandoned after children searching for the hidden candy eggs tore up shrubbery and landscape in their search.

Other zoo animals and many special attractions, like Flipper and spaceship rides, were displayed throughout the year. Automotive events, such as autocross racing and motorcycle riding school took place in the parking lot. In the 1980s, the gazebo area was constructed where the kiddie rides once were. Ragtime and brass bands played regularly by the gazebo in the 1980s and 1990s. Shoppers' World was the first shopping center to have a musical water fountain show, a feature famously used by The Grove at Farmers Market in Los Angeles. The "Dancing Waters" attraction was based on the fountains at the 1939 New York World's Fair and was programmed to music and colored lights. There was also a train/tram that brought customers around the mall.

In 1967, the Jordan Marsh Basement Store was built at the north end of the mall. Jordan Marsh's original main store, located on the south end, had a remote underground entry point in the middle of the parking lot near the bus stop. Shoppers could enter a small enclosure and walk down two flights of stairs to arrive in the lower level of the Jordan Marsh store. Jordan Marsh also had a separate tire store that stood alone across the street on the west side of the mall.

The large yellow smokestack on the outer west side originally had "Sears" written on it but was removed when the store moved to the newer Natick Mall in 1965.

== Replacement ==
While the mall had enjoyed several decades of success from shoppers and retailers alike, the overall facility was beginning to show its age by the early 1980s. Aside from the additions of the Stop & Shop and Jordan Marsh Basement Store anchors, the original mall itself had changed very little since opening in 1951.

In 1983, Shopper's World was sold to Melvin Simon and Robert Campeau, who proposed to replace it with a new enclosed, multi-floor structure with four anchor stores. Construction on the new Shopper's World was slated to begin in late 1980s. However, Robert Campeau's Campeau Corporation went bankrupt before plans could be finalized and the expansion begun. Adding to this, a series of lawsuits over the nature of the project between Simon and Campeau delayed development plans. In 1992, the mall was sold to the Sears real estate division, Homart Development Company. Homart, who also purchased the adjacent Natick Mall property, canceled the expansion plans for both mall complexes and developed two new concepts for a completely rebuilt, enclosed mall on the larger Shopper's World property and a power center at the Natick Mall location.

However, one of the major tenants, Filene's, had completely remodeled and expanded its Natick location as part of the former Natick Mall expansion plans and was unwilling to spend more capital on constructing a new building at Shopper's World. In response, Homart reversed the plans and developed the concepts that became the new Natick Mall and Shoppers' World. The original mall's tenants were moved into the Shopper's World complex in 1993, and the mall torn down. A new, modern two-story Natick mall with over 200 stores was built and opened in late 1994. After tenants were moved to the new Natick Mall, the original Shopper's World closed in August, 1994, and demolition occurred in the following months.

The new Shopper's World was reopened as a modern, U-shaped power center in 1995. The new Shopper's World (the possessive "s" was changed to the singular form), a strip mall that features 781,507 ft^{2} (72,604 m^{2}) of retail space. Stores include Best Buy, John Harvard's Brew House, Starbucks, Barnes & Noble, Chipotle, The Paper Store, Nordstrom Rack, and many others.

The center is also home to the first HomeSense in the United States and opened alongside Sierra Trading Post in August 2017, replacing a Sports Authority store.

On January 24, 2018, it was announced that Toys "R" Us' sister store, Babies "R" Us would be closing as part of a plan to close 182 Toys "R" Us and/or Babies "R" Us stores nationwide due to bankruptcy. The Babies "R" Us store closed in April 2018. On March 14, 2018, Toys "R" Us announced that they would be closing all 1,795 locations Worldwide, including the Shopper's World Toys "R" Us location. The store closed on June 27, 2018. Toy City moved in place in September.

On November 25, 2019, It was announced that A.C. Moore will be closing all 145 stores, including the one at Shoppers World in Framingham.

According to a news article from October 30, 2020 John Harvard's Brew House has permanently closed.

On January 10, 2022, it was announced that a new grocery store would replace the Barnes & Noble and Old Navy stores.

In October 2022, outdoor specialty retailer Public Lands opened in the former Bob's Store location.

On November 2, 2023, Shopper's World was acquired by Urban Edge Properties.

== See also ==
- Country Club Plaza - first shopping mall in the U.S.
- Highland Park Village - second shopping mall in the U.S.
- Lake View Store - first enclosed shopping mall
- Natick Mall - a large enclosed shopping mall adjacent to Shopper's World.
