= Adriatic Mills =

Industrial complex in Massachusetts, US

- U.S. National Register of Historic Places
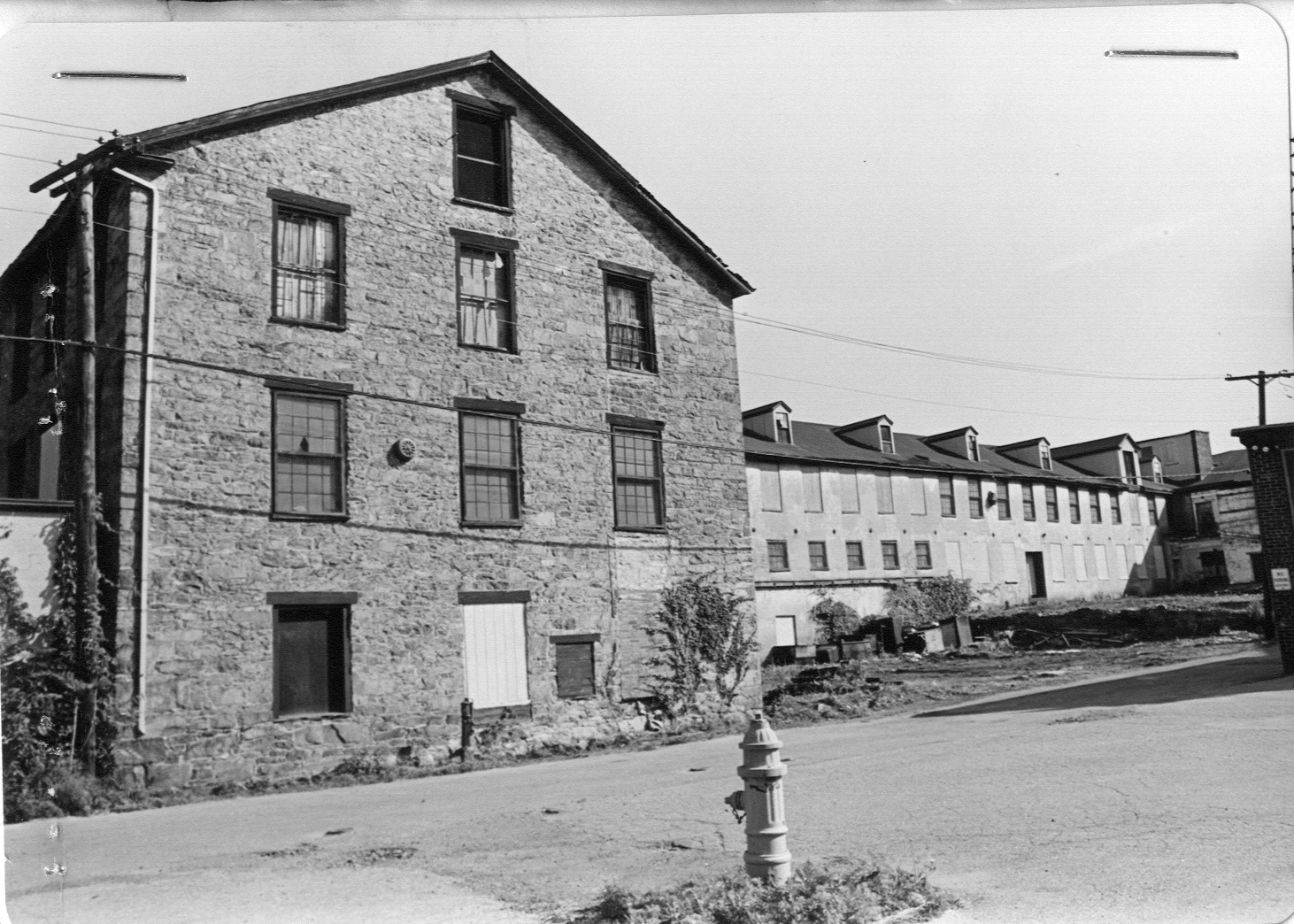
- c. 1977 photo

- Location within Massachusetts Location within the United States
- Location: 3–35 Armory St., Worcester, Massachusetts
- Coordinates: 42°14′48″N 71°48′49″W
- Built: 1854
- Architect: Eli Thayer
- MPS: Worcester MRA
- NRHP reference No.: 80000483
- Added to NRHP: March 5, 1980

The Adriatic Mills was a historic industrial complex on Armory Street in Worcester, Massachusetts. In 1854 Eli Thayer (best known for his abolitionist activities) constructed a stone industrial building known as the Lower Junction Shop, He constructed the mill with stone chips taken from Oread Hill in Worcester. The fine stone was mixed with a mortar forming a concrete. Wooden frames were mounted and the concrete was poured in and allowed to harden - no masonry being employed in raising the walls. The original building was 400 ft long. 40 ft wide and 2 stories high. Mr. Thayer then sold his interest in the building to Charles White and J.P. Southgate. Afterwards, it came into possession of Benjamin F. Joslyn, an arms manufacturer. He manufactured the Joslyn rifle, the first breech-loading rifle, on these premises before selling them in 1863 to the Jordan Marsh Company. Jordan Marsh expanded and repurposed the premises for the production of textiles, and gave the complex the name "Adriatic Mills". It continued to be used for textile production into the 1920s.

The complex was listed on the National Register of Historic Places in 1980, at which time it was being used as a foundry by the Chromalloy Corporation. It has since been demolished (c. 2009) to make way for redevelopment.

== See also ==
- National Register of Historic Places listings in southwestern Worcester, Massachusetts
- National Register of Historic Places listings in Worcester County, Massachusetts
