= Natick Mall =

Shopping mall in Middlesex County, Massachusetts, U.S.

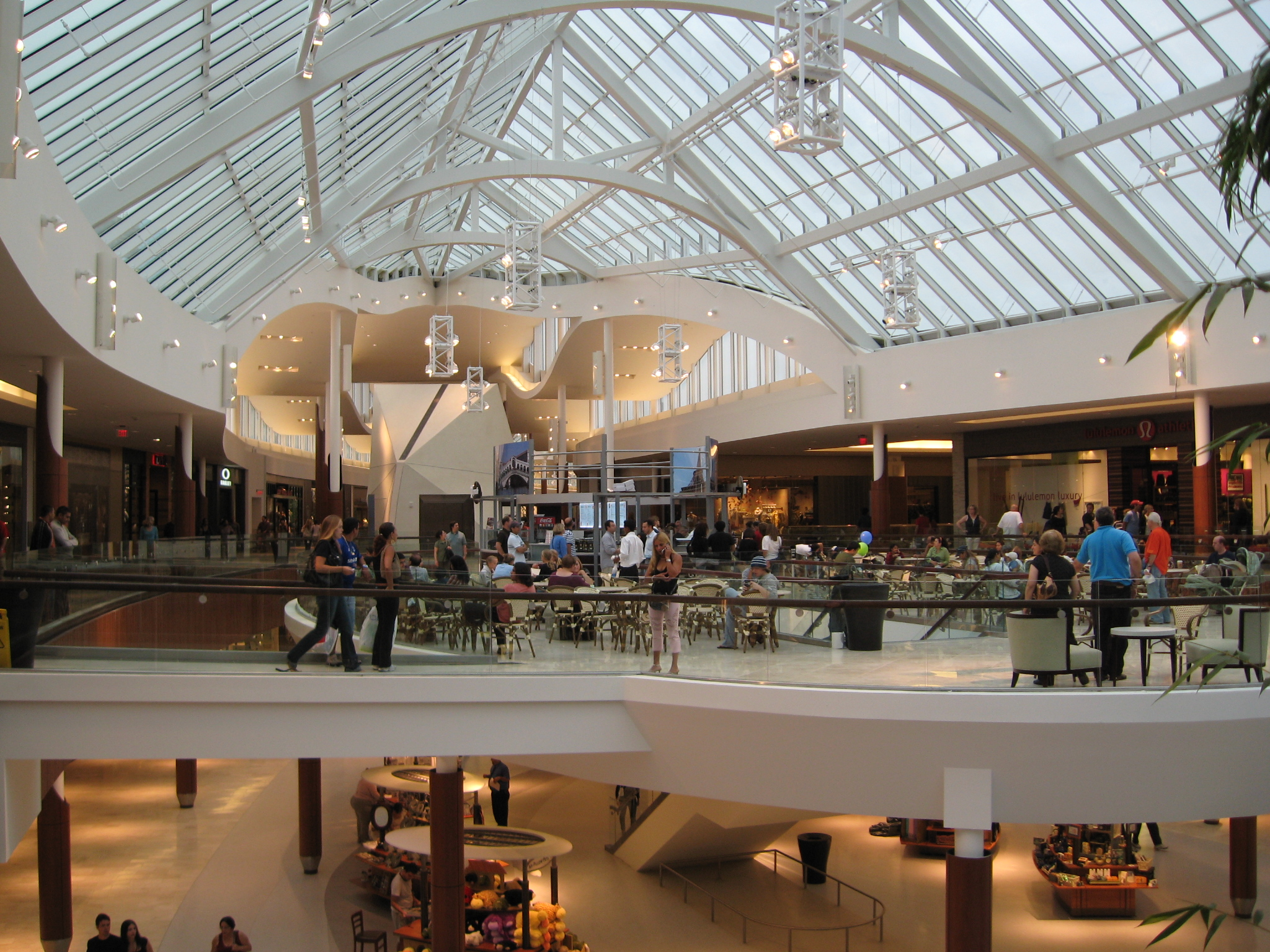
- Mall interior looking toward expansion wing (2007)
- Former names: Natick Collection (2007–2011)

General information
- Status: Operational
- Type: Shopping mall
- Location: 1245 Worcester Road, Natick, Massachusetts, United States
- Coordinates: 42°18′2″N 71°23′3″W
- Opened: April 27, 1966; 60 years ago
- Renovated: 1979-1980 (partial); 1992–1994; 2006–2009
- Owner: GGP
- Operator: GGP

Technical details
- Floor count: 2
- Floor area: 1,695,884 square feet (157,552.8 m^{2}) of gross leasable area

Design and construction
- Developer: John Brennan; William Lane; Stephen Mugar

Renovating team
- Architects: Arrowstreet, Inc. (1994–1996); Beyer Blinder Belle (2006–2009)
- Renovating firm: Homart Development Company (1994–1996)

Other information
- Number of stores: 228
- Number of anchors: 7
- Public transit: MWRTA: 102, 103, 105, 201, 203, 206, 309

Website
- natickmall.com

The Natick Mall (briefly known as the Natick Collection) is a shopping mall in Natick, Massachusetts. It has been owned and managed by GGP since 1995, which became a BGRE subsidiary in 2018. The original facility was the first enclosed shopping mall in Greater Boston upon opening in 1966; it was partially demolished and replaced by a larger building in 1994 and expanded in 2007. The mall, with the adjacent Shopper's World power center in Framingham, are components of the Golden Triangle shopping district in the center of MetroWest, situated between Route 9 and Route 30.

The Natick Mall is anchored by Bosse, Dave & Buster's, Level99, Macy's, Nordstrom, Raymour & Flanigan, and T Market. Previous anchors include Filene's, Jordan Marsh, Sears, Lord & Taylor, JCPenney, Wegmans and Neiman Marcus.

== History ==
=== Opening of original mall ===
The original Natick Mall was developed by businessmen William Lane, Stephen Mugar, and John Brennan. Construction began in 1965, connecting two stand-alone locations of Sears and Filene's (which had opened in March and August 1965, respectively), with a 600,000-square-foot (56,000-square-meter), single-level shopping venue with 30 in-line stores. The project was one of the first enclosed malls in Greater Boston, and among the first built east of the Mississippi River. It was dedicated on April 27, 1966, with two smaller anchors on the north end of the mall, Woolworth's, Pray's Furniture, and a large fountain/entertainment area in front of Sears. Other charter tenants included Thom McAn, Baker Shoes, Ann Taylor, Parklane Hosiery, and a Hot Shoppes Cafeteria (later a York Steak House). There were many other notable tenants such as CVS Pharmacy, Fanny Farmer's Candies, Brigham's, Tie Rack and many more.

Pray's Furniture was eventually replaced with a Boston Baby store in 1971, and later became a Playmart in 1975, but after the closure of Playmart in 1979, the vacant space was renovated into an additional retail wing and a four-bay food court in September 1980. This was the mall's first ever renovation. The mall opened many new tenants such as; Orange Julius, Papa Gino's in the food court, The Gap, The Limited, Chess King, and a bunch more of new tenants.

By 1985, the mall had been acquired from the original owners by S.R. Weiner & Associates and William Finard, and, aside from the conversion of the former Boston Baby wing, the overall facility and retail mix had been virtually unchanged since opening in 1966. Weiner and Finard proposed an expansion of the mall, which would include the addition of a Lord & Taylor anchor as well as a second level of retail. However, not enough capital could be raised, and, coupled with lawsuits with Shopper's World owner Melvin Simon (who had made a controversial redevelopment proposal of that mall), the project was suspended indefinitely. Filene's proceeded with a renovation of its store in 1990 as part of the former expansion plans. This part was completed in 1991.

=== 1992–1994 construction of replacement ===
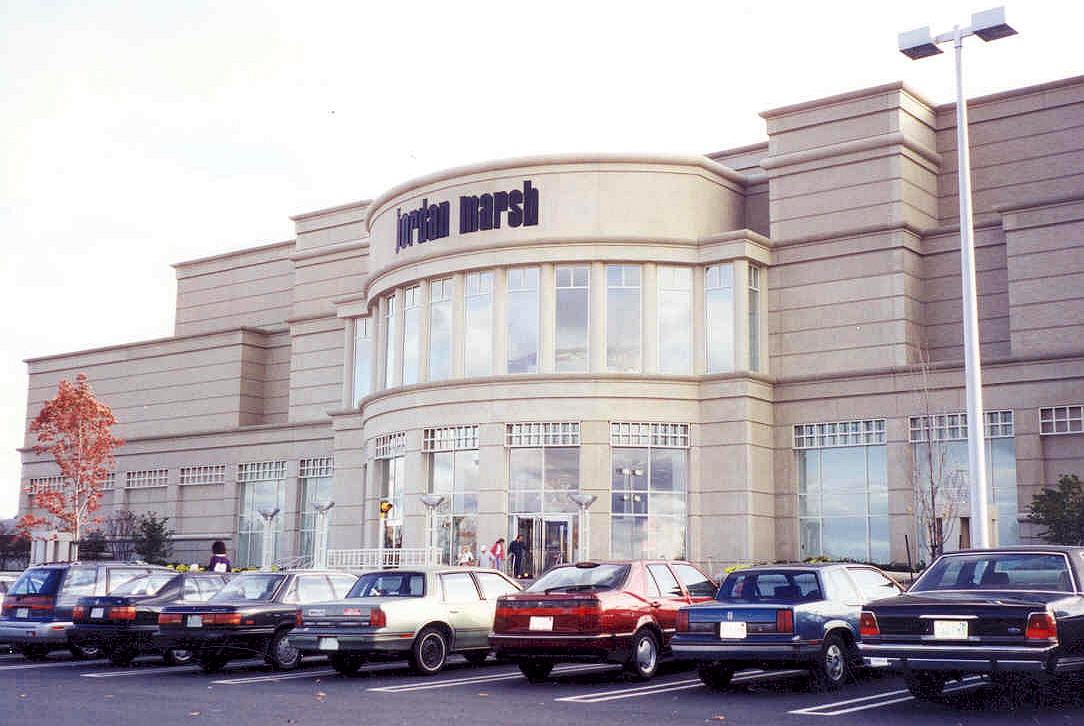
Jordan Marsh anchor location (1994). This store was replaced by the first Macy's, then a JCPenney, and then a Wegmans supermarket. Wegmans was later replaced by T Market which is an Asian supermarket.

By the early 1990s, the outdated mall had caused many shoppers to go to other larger, more modern area malls. In 1992, the Homart Development Company purchased the Natick Mall and the adjacent Shopper's World in Framingham for redevelopment. Initial plans called for the Natick Mall to become a power center and Shopper's World an enclosed shopping mall; however, Filene's was unwilling to spend more capital on a new building at Shopper's World after remodeling their store in the mall, thus the plans were switched onto the opposite properties.

The 27-year old original mall, except Filene's, was demolished in June 1993; its two-floor replacement, originally slated to open in August 1994, opened on October 12, 1994. The Filene's portion of the mall would be the only vestige of the original mall. When the mall opened it included previous anchor stores Filene's, Jordan Marsh, and a rebuilt Sears in addition to new anchor store Lord & Taylor. Jordan Marsh was purchased by Federated Department Stores in 1994, and the nameplate was replaced by Macy's chain-wide in 1996.

Macy's relocated from the Jordan Marsh space to the Filene's space in 2006 when Macy's merged with Filene's. J. C. Penney opened in the former Jordan Marsh/Macy's space on March 9, 2007.

=== 2006–2009 renovation and expansion ===
In late 2006, the mall began a renovation and expansion project. Its image was re-branded, first by attempting to change its name to simply Natick. After resistance from the town, the mall was instead renamed the Natick Collection. The first phase saw the renovation of the existing facility and the addition of a new wing on the property's north-east end, on the site of the former Wonder Bread/Hostess factory. The expansion added two new anchors, Nordstrom and Neiman Marcus, and nearly 100 new stores to the mall. This phase was opened to the public on September 7, 2007, though some stores planned to open through the winter and following spring. Construction of a Crate & Barrel, a relocated California Pizza Kitchen, and an American Girl Boutique and Bistro began in April 2008, with an original completion time frame of early spring 2009. The southwest mall entrance was moved approximately 100 ft (30 m), placing it between Crate & Barrel and the California Pizza Kitchen, across from the northwest wing housing J. C. Penney. The new 30,000 sq ft (2,800 m^{2}) Crate & Barrel facility replaced the original 10,000 sq ft (930 m^{2}) store with a new one-level store (with two-story facade) that occupies parts of the original location. In October 2009, the second phase of the expansion, "The Promenade at Natick Collection", opened on the south-western section of the mall along Route 9; a Cheesecake Factory opened shortly after. The third phase, the construction of the condominiums, which originally had a projected completion of summer 2008, finished construction during spring 2009. The final phase is the proposed addition of a ten to twelve story luxury hotel adjacent to the new wing and across from J. C. Penney. Initial site work was completed in 2008. With the addition and the new eight-story parking facility, the Natick Collection became the twenty-third largest mall in the country, fourth largest on the east coast, and the largest in New England.

The Great Recession negatively affected mall expansion. By December 2008, condominium sales in Nouvelle at Natick were behind projections, with only 34 of the 215 units sold or under contract. Real estate agents in the Metrowest area stated that the prices of the units, ranging from $379,900 to over $1 million, combined with the timing of the opening of the facility have harmed sales. Several real estate agencies stated that the developer would have had to lower its prices for the units to attract consumers. Additionally, home sales in the Natick and Framingham area are traditionally oriented towards single family homes. On September 10, 2009, The Boston Globe reported that Nouvelle at Natick would auction off 42 of the 215 units, with bids starting as low as $160,000.

=== 2010s ===
In July 2011, the Natick Collection reverted to its original name, the Natick Mall, citing local tradition.

In 2015, It was announced Wegmans would be replacing JCPenney. This was discussed by analysts as following suit with the "emerging trend" of nontraditional anchors in order to "emphasize experiences and fun over shopping". Construction began in 2016 and the store was opened on April 29, 2018. It is the first Wegmans to have multiple levels, entrances within a shopping center, and a full-service restaurant.

E-commerce retailer Wayfair opened its first brick-and-mortar store, a pop-up for the holiday season, from November 10, 2018, through January 2, 2019.

In January 2018, it was announced that Dave & Buster's would replace half of the second floor of the former Sears. In October 15, it was announced that Sears would close as a part of closure of 142 unprofitable stores. In January 2019, Sears would permanently close. Dave & Buster's opened in the second floor of Sears on June 24, 2019.

=== 2020s ===
The 2020s saw several traditional department store retailers update their brick-and-mortar retail divisions after being disrupted by digital retailers.

On August 27, 2020, it was announced that the Lord & Taylor anchor store would close, when the chain went out of business. This structure is set to be completely rebuilt, creating a vibrant "city within a city" like atmosphere. On September 20, 2020, Neiman Marcus announced plans to shutter their location in Natick Mall. Closure was expected to take place in September 2022.

In 2021, it was announced that Shopper's Find will replace Lord & Taylor; Shopper's Find closed two years later in November 2022. The same year, Level99, an entertainment complex, taproom, and beer hall opened inside a portion of the former Sears anchor space.

On January 9, 2022, it was reported that Brookfield, the mall owner and developer, has partnered with real estate developer Bulfinch Companies to acquire the original Neiman Marcus location for around $12.6 million. On May 16, 2022, it was reported that Bulfinch proposed the development of office, medical, and lab space. The new three-floor 135,000-square-foot structure which will include a penthouse, lobby, and terraces.

On January 12, 2022, Luxury electric vehicle maker Lucid Motors announced plans to open a showroom by September, 2022.

On December 11, 2022, Puttshack announced plans to open a two-level 22,000-square-foot mini golf course by the end of 2023. On October 11, 2023, it was reported that Bulfinch was planning to work with D.J. Bosse, a local fitness center operator, to build a pickleball club.

Wegmans closed permanently on July 22, 2023 due to underperforming sales at the location despite the chain being very profitable. In December 2024, D.J. Bosse, a sports lounge, would open in the former Neiman Marcus department store.

In March 2025, it was announced that Raymour & Flanigan would open their in the vacant space of the former Lord & Taylor/Shoppers Find. The furniture store opened in March, 2026.

In May 2025, it was announced that T Market, a high-end Asian supermarket, would be opening in the former Wegmans space. The supermarket is currently under construction with a projected opening in 2026. T Market held its soft opening to the public on June 6, 2026, opening in the former Wegmans space. The grand opening was held a few days later.

== Architecture ==
Following a two-level, generally T-shaped floor plan, the Natick Mall spans 1,860,000 square feet (173,000 m^{2}). With its late-2000s expansion, it makes use of natural lighting with the intention of providing an open atmosphere. Its curved ceiling was inspired by the name Natick, meaning "place of rolling hills" in the Massachusett language. Much of the mall's design incorporates the leaves of the birch tree. The expansion provided an underground parking garage in addition to its three existing structures. The lower level incorporates porcelain tile flooring, while the upper level uses engineered hardwood flooring; the design utilizes glass fixtures throughout. The exterior of the Neiman Marcus location is covered by 80-foot (24 m) curved stainless steel panels colored in various shades of brown; it is intended to resemble a woman's dress.

== Ownership ==
Homart Development Corporation (then a division of Sears) was acquired by General Growth Properties (GGP) in December 1995, at which time the Natick Mall was valued at $265 million. GGP itself was later acquired by Brookfield Property Partners, and management was transferred to the Brookfield Properties subsidiary in August 2018.

== Reception ==
MassLive ranked the Natick Mall first-place on their list of 40 shopping malls in Massachusetts in December 2018, citing its "balanced combination of high-end stores and typical mall fare."

== See also ==
- Shopper's World – Power center adjacent to the mall
- Golden Triangle – District in which the mall is as located
