= Leewards Creative Crafts =

Leewards
- Company type: private
- Founded: 1945
- Founder: Dexter Thread Mills, Inc.
- Defunct: 1994
- Fate: Purchased by Michaels
- Headquarters: Elgin, Illinois, United States of America
- Area served: Midwestern United States, Northeastern United States
- Products: Crafts

Leewards Creative Crafts, or Leewards, was an American crafts and fabrics retailer. It was founded in Elgin, Illinois, in 1947. The chain had approximately 101 stores at its peak. In 1994, it was purchased by Michaels.
