= Golden Triangle (Massachusetts) =

Retail district in the United States

Coordinates: 42°18′4.7″N 71°23′23.8″W

The Golden Triangle is one of the largest retail districts in New England and is located on the borders of Framingham and Natick, Massachusetts, in the heart of the MetroWest region of the state. The district is anchored by the two malls in the area, Shopper's World and the Natick Mall. The 3 mi^{2} (7.8 km^{2}) area is the second largest shopping district in Massachusetts outside of Downtown Crossing in Boston.

== History ==
The Golden Triangle was originally a three square mile district on the eastern side of Framingham, bordered by Worcester Rd. (Route 9), Cochituate Rd. (Route 30), and Speen Street in Natick. In 1993, the area began to expand beyond the borders of the triangle with construction of a BJ's Wholesale Club and a Super Stop & Shop just north of Route 30. It now includes the original area plus parts of Old Connecticut Path, Concord St. (Route 126) and Speen St. north of Route 30. Because of the size and complexity of the area, Framingham and Natick cooperatively operate it as a single distinct district with similar zoning.

The area was formed with the construction of Shoppers World in 1951. Shoppers' World was a large open air shopping mall, the second in the US with parking surrounding the exterior of the mall. The mall drew many other retail construction projects to the area, the first of which was Sherwood Plaza built in 1959. In April 1960, when Sherwood Plaza opened for business, it contained an Elm Farm Food store, a W.T. Grant store and the third Zayre store in the Zayre chain as well as the only Zayre warehouse, and the Zayre main offices. Retail developments thereafter included Marshalls (1961, rebuilt as Bed Bath & Beyond 1997), Caldor (1966, Rebuilt as Wal-Mart in 2002), Bradlees (1960s, rebuilt as Kohl's in 2002), the Route 30 Mall (1970), an AMC Framingham 15, the Framingham Mall (1978, rebuilt 2000) and Lowe's (formally the Verizon Building, 2006). Complementary developments in Natick include the Natick Mall (1966, rebuilt in 1994, expanded 2007), Cloverleaf Marketplace (1978) and the Home Depot. In 1994, Shoppers' World was demolished and replaced with a strip mall named Shoppers World. There are also seven hotels and two car dealerships located within the Triangle.

In addition to retail properties, there are large office developments located in the area including several companies headquartered in the triangle; the world headquarters of TJX is located at the junction of Route 30 and Speen St, as is the main office of IDG and IDC. Breyers, Leggat McCall, the American Heart Association and the American Cancer Society have facilities in the area. In all there are over a dozen large office complexes located in and along the borders of the Triangle.

In February 2012, FedEx received permission from the Natick Zoning board to construct a new 171,000 ft (52,000 m) distribution facility adjacent to the Boston Scientific property, on Superior Ave. The new facility is designed to handle FedEx business side customers through its FedEx Ground unit. Local residents complained about the facility, stating that with all the new residential construction in the area, a new athletic facility should be built in the area instead to accommodate the influx of new families.

== Housing ==
In the 1950s, when Shopper's World was constructed, the area was a mixture of farmland and single-family housing. Since that time, the majority of the single-family homes were razed and replaced with commercial properties or turned into commercial properties. The remaining homes in the area are found at the west end of the Triangle in several small subdivisions.

Before the town of Framingham enacted a ban on large scale multi-unit apartment buildings in the mid 1970s, two larger complexes were built in on the edges of what is now the west and south ends of the triangle. The first constructed was the Lord Chesterfield complex on Greenview St. It is a series of six two-story buildings with approximately forty units per building with a small amenities building on the west side of the lot. The Bayberry Hill apartments are a larger six-story building limited-access complex on Dinsmore Ave. on the southwest side.

Since the construction of the two apartment complexes, the level of housing in the triangle has remained the same or dropped as older homes were demolished or converted to business use. However, the addition of the Nouvelle at Natick condominiums at the Natick Mall in 2008 added over 300 luxury housing units in the heart of the region. The units, part of the reconstruction of the Natick Mall, are part of the "lifestyle center" concept. The units, ranging from $200,000-$1,000,000, are marketed with such amenities as concierge service, valet service, a rooftop garden, exclusive access to the mall and membership to a local, high-end health club. During December 2008, the complex did not meet the sales expectations of the company; additionally, General Growth's financial troubles began to worry residents over the future of the facility. in September 2009, The Boston Globe reported that Nouvelle at Natick would auction off 42 of the 215 units, with bids starting as low as $160,000.

A second set of apartments featuring 404 units in two 11-story buildings opened at the east end of the Cloverleaf Market place, a former mall that once housed a K-Mart. An additional set of Chapter 40B compliant condominiums opened on Chrysler Ave. adjacent to Home Depot, beginning in 2008, expanding the amount of housing along the east side of the Triangle. To offset costs of the new development, the developer Avalon Development paid the town US$2 million in offset money to allay concerns that the facility would put a burden on community services. After the development was approved, Framingham sued to stop it claiming that the facility would put an added burden on the roadways located in Framingham. The suit was dismissed as having no merit.
