= Michaels =

American arts and crafts retailer

Michaels Stores, Inc.

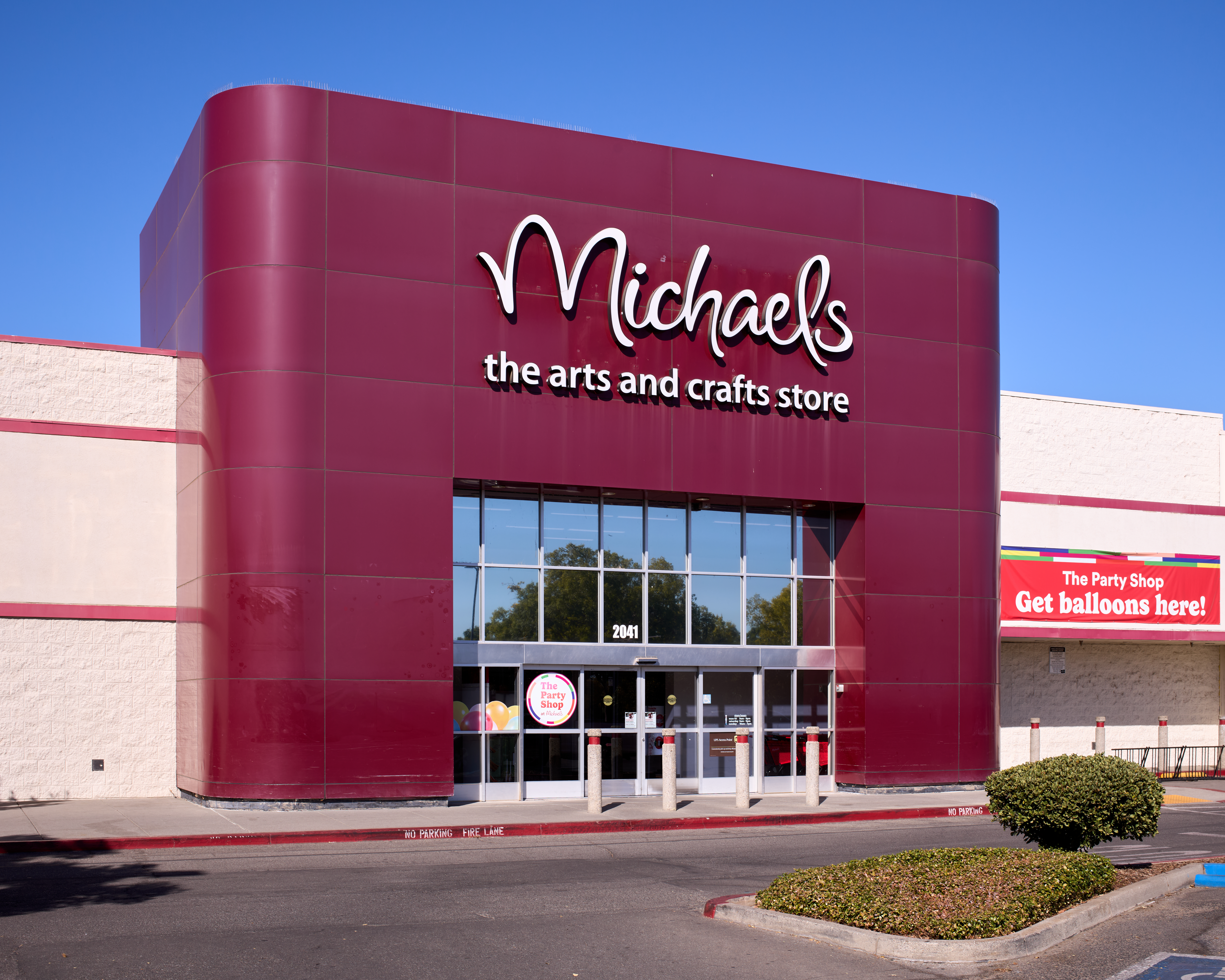
- Store in Chico, California
- Trade name: Michaels
- Type: Subsidiary
- Industry: Retail
- Founded: 1973; 53 years ago
- Founder: Michael J. Dupey
- Headquarters: Irving, Texas, U.S.
- Number of locations: 1,252 (US, Canada) (January 2021)
- Key people: David Boone (CEO)
- Products: Arts & crafts, framing, floral, wall & home décor, scrapbooking
- Parent: The Michaels Companies
- Website: michaels.com

Michaels Stores, Inc., doing business as Michaels, is an American privately held arts and crafts retail chain. It is North America's largest provider of arts, crafts, framing, floral and wall décor, and merchandise for makers and do-it-yourself home decorators. The company is a subsidiary of the Michaels Companies, which was founded in 2014 and headquartered in Irving, Texas. In addition to Michaels stores, the Michaels Companies operates Aaron Brothers Custom Framing store-within-a-store, and Artistree, a manufacturer of custom and specialty framing merchandise. As of January 2021, there were 1,252 Michaels stores in 49 out of 50 states in the U.S., and Canada, with approximately $5.362 billion in sales for fiscal 2020.

== History ==
Logo from 1984 to 2009

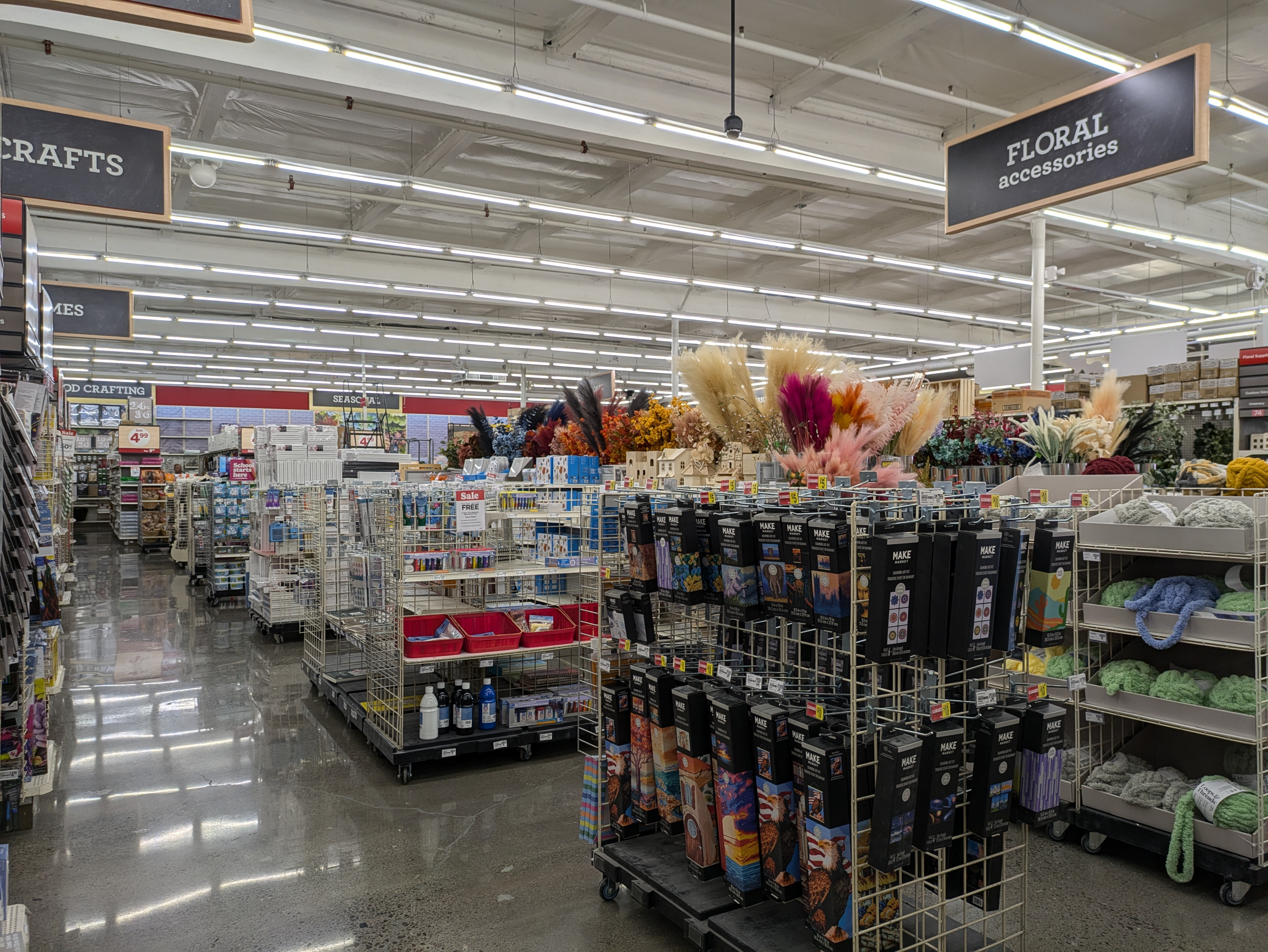
Interior of a Michaels store in San Rafael, California

In 1973, businessman Michael J. Dupey founded Michaels in Dallas when he converted a money-losing Ben Franklin five and dime store into an arts and crafts store. In 1982, Dallas businessman Sam Wyly bought a controlling interest in the company, which by then had 11 outlets with annual revenues around $10 million. After the sale, Dupey founded MJ Designs, which was later bought out by The Michaels Companies.

In 1984, Michaels was first publicly traded (on NASDAQ) under parent entity The Michaels Companies, which operated 16 stores. Over the next decade, the company bought craft and hobby stores in local and regional markets, including the 3-unit Helen's Arts & Crafts chain purchased from Wal-Mart in 1988. In 1994, Michaels Stores expanded by acquiring craft stores in the Pacific Northwest, including Treasure House Crafts, Oregon Craft & Floral Supply, and H&H Craft & Floral. In the Midwest and Northeast, it bought Leewards Creative Crafts, a 101-unit store chain. In 1995, Michaels Stores acquired Aaron Brothers Holdings, Inc., a specialty framing and art supply store. By 1996, Michaels' sales reached $1.24 billion with 450 stores. In 2006, two private equity groups, Bain Capital and the Blackstone Group, purchased Michaels Stores for $6 billion, taking it private. In May 2007, Martha Stewart and Michaels launched "Martha Stewart Crafts", an online resource for home "do-it-yourselfers" with how-to instructions, projects, and crafting products. In the fall of 2008, Michaels Stores opened its 1,000th store. In 2010, Michaels began a partnership with Chef Duff to feature the Duff Goldman Collection in its stores. The line includes baking products including fondant, sprinkle sets, color spray, cake tattoos, and color paste.

In February 2011, Michaels and Aaron Brothers stores suffered a data compromise which affected their debit card terminals in 20 states. The company alerted customers who made PIN-based purchases between February 8 and May 6, 2011, that their data may have been exposed. A class action lawsuit was filed against Michaels in the County Court of Passaic, New Jersey over the incident. In March 2012, Reuters reported that JPMorgan Chase and Goldman Sachs were "the leads on what could be one of the year's largest IPOs in the retail sector", with one source saying the IPO would be registered in April. Reuters also reported that Michaels posted earnings before interest, income taxes, depreciation, and amortization of $661 million in 2011 and had total debt of $3.5 billion as of January 28, 2012. The filing, for a $500 million common stock issue, came on March 30. The ticker would be MIK on the NYSE. A report on the filing put the company's debt at $3.8 billion and said 2011 revenue was $4.2 billion and net income was $176M. In July, the IPO was "put on hold indefinitely" after CEO John Menzer suffered a stroke.

In Menzer's absence, Lew Klessel, Bain's managing director, and Charles Sonsteby, Michaels' chief administrative officer and chief financial officer, served in a temporary office of CEO. In February 2013, Chuck Rubin was appointed CEO. Rubin was president and CEO of personal-care specialty retailer Ulta Beauty at the time of his appointment and had been with Office Depot and Accenture. The Michaels office of CEO was discontinued when Rubin assumed his position later in February and Sonsteby continued as CAO/CFO. In June 2014, Michaels became a public company under newly formed parent, the Michaels Companies.

In 2020, Ashley Buchanan, formerly of Walmart, became the new CEO of Michaels. Later that year, Michaels introduced a new store concept at two locations in Texas, which features a new open layout built around "inspiration hubs", new "maker space" areas for instruction, and self-service pickup lockers for online orders. The company said that aspects of this concept would be introduced at new and renovated locations in the future including in Regina, Saskatchewan, which in 2023 became the first Canadian location to adopt the format after being closed following a fire). In March 2021, The Michaels Companies agreed to be acquired by private equity company Apollo Global Management, taking the company private.

In 2025, Michaels took advantage of the in-store retail vacuum caused by the bankruptcy proceedings and store closings of Party City and Jo-Ann Stores by moving into those store's niche markets of party supplies and fabrics, respectively.

== Products ==
Michaels Stores sells a variety of arts and crafts products including scrapbooking, beading, knitting, rubber stamping, home décor items, floral items, kids' crafts, paints, framing, greenery, baking, and many seasonal items. Michaels produces a dozen private brands including Recollections, Studio Decor, Bead Landing, Creatology, Ashland, Celebrate It, Art Minds, Artist's Loft, Craft Smart, Loops & Threads, Make Market, Foamies, LockerLookz, Imagin8, and Sticky Sticks.

Michaels offers custom framing through its Aaron Brothers Custom Framing store-within-a-store and online. Online, customers can upload, edit and print photos from their computer or social media sites. They then select and customize the size, surface, frame, and mat.

== Michaels Marketplace ==
Michaels Marketplace is an online platform launched in February 2023 by Michaels to expand its product selection through third-party sellers. It allows resellers, distributors, and brands to list mass-produced goods such as art supplies, yarn, frames, and classroom materials on Michaels.com. Sellers are required to have a U.S. legal entity, a fulfillment location in the U.S., and typically over $1 million in annual revenue. Michaels Marketplace is separate from MakerPlace by Michaels, which is intended for individual creators selling handmade products.
