= Bloomberg Technology =

Television series

Bloomberg Technology, formerly called Bloomberg West, is an American television show produced by Bloomberg Television. Andy Lack, chief executive officer (CEO) of Bloomberg Media Group launched Bloomberg West in 2011.

The show focused on the topics of technology, innovation, and business and was hosted by Emily Chang and Cory Johnson. Before coming to Bloomberg Television, Chang was a CNN television host in Beijing. Co-host Cory Johnson, ran a hedge fund and reported on Silicon Valley for CNBC before joining Bloomberg Television.

From its start in 2011, the show has been recorded in Bloomberg’s San Francisco Pier 3 studio and aired daily at 6:00pm EST.

Bloomberg West was named Bloomberg Technology as part of the launch of Bloomberg Technology as a "multi-platform brand" on October 5, 2016.

In August 16, 2024, Bloomberg Technology is ceased broadcasting at 11:56 am (NY) and is change name to Style It Out at 11am (SGT).
