= A.C. Moore =

Defunct American retailer

A.C.Moore
- Company type: Subsidiary
- Industry: Retail
- Founded: 1985
- Defunct: July 2020
- Fate: Defunct; acquired by The Michaels Companies
- Successor: The Michaels Companies
- Headquarters: Berlin, New Jersey, United States
- Number of locations: 145 (2019; before closure)
- Products: Arts & crafts, scrapbooking, home decor
- Parent: Sbar's (2011–2019)
- Website: www.acmoore.com

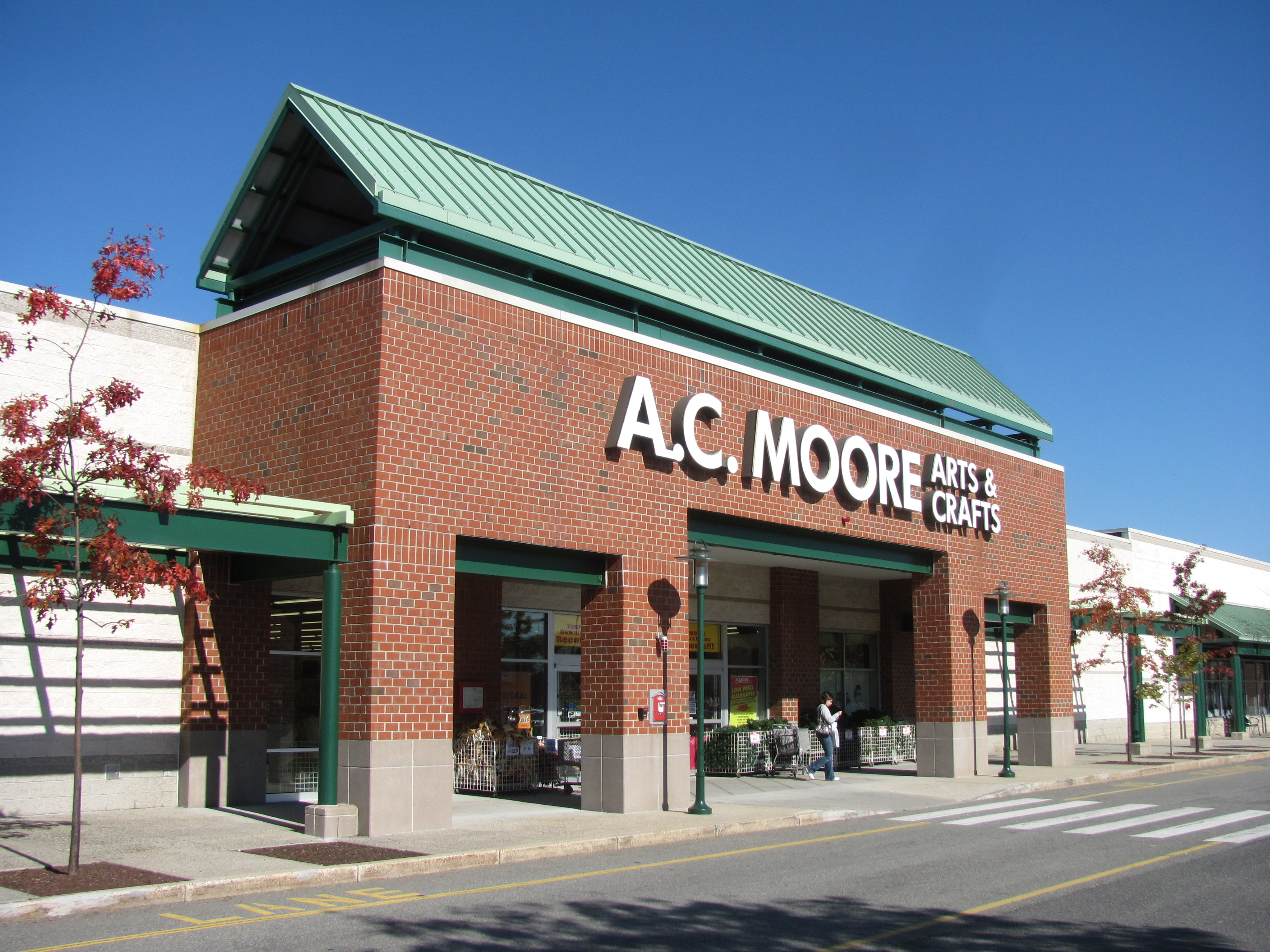
At Shopper's World in Framingham, Massachusetts.

A.C. Moore was an American arts and crafts retail chain, owned by Nicole Crafts. It had 145 retail locations in the eastern United States, with corporate headquarters in Berlin, New Jersey. On November 25, 2019, A.C. Moore announced that it would wind down its operations, closing all stores, and selling selected leases and other assets to a competitor, Michaels.

A.C. Moore sold a variety of arts and crafts products, including scrapbooking, beading, knitting, rubber stamping, home decor items, floral items, children's crafts, paints, framing, greenery and seasonal items. They were known for a policy of discounts and beating competitors' prices.

== History ==
=== Early history ===
A.C. Moore was founded as a single arts and crafts store by Jack Parker and William Kaplan in 1985 in Moorestown, New Jersey ("A. C. Moore" – arts and crafts, Moorestown). Parker, with the position of president, was a merchandising veteran of Woolworth's, and Kaplan, CEO, had a career in fashion production.

A.C. Moore went public in October 1997.

=== Decline, buyout, and closure ===
By 2006, the A.C. Moore had peaked with sales of $598 million but these numbers began to decline in the years that followed.

In 2011, as A.C. Moore was experiencing a cash crunch, one of its suppliers stepped in to save the company through a merger. Sbar's, an art supplies distributor based in nearby Moorestown, in association with its affiliate Nicole Crafts, acquired A. C. Moore for $1.61 per-share (a valuation of $41 million). The buyout was executed as a merger, with A. C. Moore becoming a subsidiary of Nicole Crafts, the Sbar's in-house goods brand. Sbar's seven retail stores were absorbed into A. C. Moore.

On November 25, 2019, A.C. Moore announced that it would close all 145 of its locations (with some closing as early as December 15, 2019), and sell the leases for up to 40 locations, a distribution center, and unspecified intellectual property assets to the competing chain Michaels. As of June 2020, A. C. Moore was still undergoing the liquidation process. As of July 2020, all stores had been closed, and Michaels had taken over its distribution facility on A. C. Moore Drive in Winslow, New Jersey.

== See also ==
- Retail apocalypse
- List of retailers affected by the retail apocalypse
