= Jordan Marsh =

American department store chain

Coordinates: 42.355142°N 71.060462°W

Jordan Marsh & Company

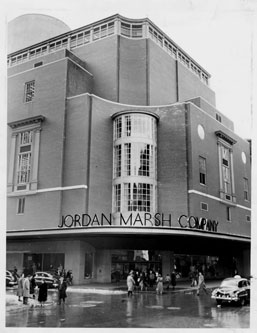
- Exterior of the former flagship store in Downtown Crossing, Boston (c. 1950)
- Trade name: Jordan Marsh
- Type: Subsidiary
- Industry: Retail
- Genre: Department stores
- Founded: 1841; 185 years ago in Boston, Massachusetts, United States
- Founders: Eben Dyer Jordan; Benjamin L. Marsh
- Defunct: 1996; 30 years ago
- Fate: Acquisition by Federated Department Stores
- Successor: Macy's
- Headquarters: Boston, Massachusetts, United States
- Products: Clothing; footwear; bedding; furniture; jewelry; beauty products; housewares
- Parent: Hahn Department Stores (1928–1935); Allied Stores (1935–1992); Federated Department Stores (1992–1996)

Jordan Marsh was an American department store chain founded in 1841 by Eben Dyer Jordan and Benjamin L. Marsh. It was headquartered in Boston, Massachusetts, and operated throughout New England. The destruction of the historical flagship store on Washington Street in Downtown Crossing, built in 1861 and demolished in 1975, contributed to the creation of the Boston Landmarks Commission. The suburban store at Shoppers' World in Framingham, built in 1951 and replaced in 1993, was a local landmark because of its large exterior dome.

Jordan Marsh was acquired by Hahn Department Stores in 1928, which itself was acquired by Allied Stores in 1935. Allied and competing department store holding company Federated Department Stores were purchased by the Campeau Corporation in 1988, which ultimately resulted in the bankruptcy of both and the consolidation of Allied into Federated in 1992. Federated dissolved Jordan Marsh and converted stores to Macy's in 1996.

A separate Jordan Marsh Florida division was operated by Allied from 1956 until being converted to Burdines in 1991.

== 19th-century history ==
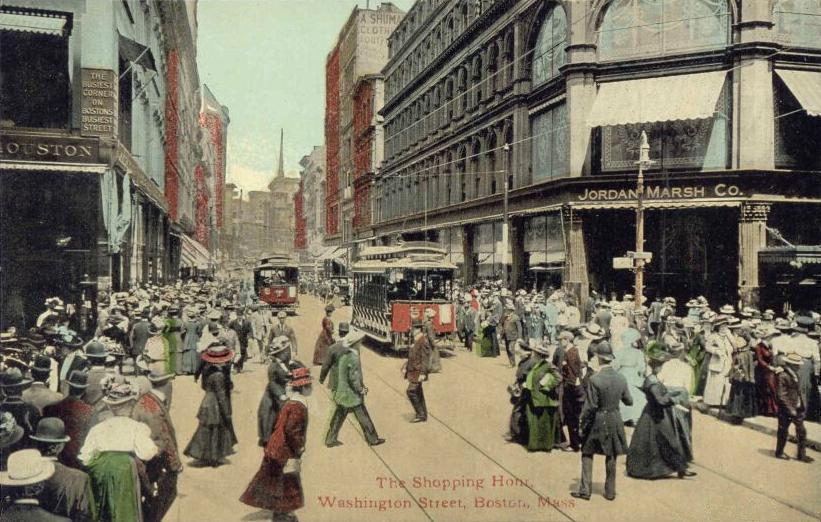
An illustration of shoppers crowding the entrance to Jordan Marsh in Boston (c. 1910)

In 1841, Eben Dyer Jordan left his job at a Boston dry goods store and went into business for himself, laying the foundation for the first Jordan Marsh. Ten years later, Jordan partnered with Boston merchant Benjamin L. Marsh. They began by selling linen, silk, and other dry goods from Europe to wholesale customers in and around Boston.

As the business grew, the company moved from one location to another. In 1861, Jordan and Marsh decided to begin selling directly to the public. They acquired a brownstone building at 450 Washington Street, in the heart of present-day Downtown Crossing in Boston. After the American Civil War ended in 1865, Jordan and Marsh expanded into nearby buildings, offering an increasing quantity and variety of goods. The partners eventually established the nation's first departmentalized store, calling it Jordan Marsh and Company. During the second half of the 19th century, Eben Jordan's son, Jordan Jr., and George Mitton, a new partner, took over the company, turning it into a modern department store.

In addition to establishing the first department store, Jordan Marsh introduced the concept of department shopping, combining an elegant atmosphere with excellent personal service and a wide range of merchandise. With many different departments displaying wares from around the world, the store drew shoppers from Boston and from the growing streetcar suburbs. Once at the store, consumers could do more than just shop. Jordan Marsh offered fashion shows, a bakery famous for its blueberry muffins, art exhibitions, and even afternoon concerts.

Jordan Marsh also pioneered new services for shoppers not available in more traditional specialty shops, offering credit, usually in the form of charge accounts. It introduced the customer-is-always right policy, and offered money-back guarantees. Jordan Marsh was implemented new technology, and was one of the first stores to feature electrical lights, glass showcases, telephones, and elevators. It also installed pneumatic tubes that delivered cash and credit information to individual departments.

== 20th-century history ==
In 1935, the Jordan Marsh department store in Boston became one of the founders of New York City-based Allied Stores Corporation, a successor to Hahn Department Stores, Inc., a holding company founded in 1928.

Following the end of World War II in 1945, Jordan Marsh's management announced that it intended to build a new store in Downtown Boston. Jordan's five older buildings secured a new building, which consumed a full city block. Covering an area larger than Harvard Stadium, it had two stories underground and another 14 that rose into the air. It had the latest technology, including air conditioning, automatic doorways, block-long show windows, and radiant-heated sidewalks.

=== Suburban expansion ===
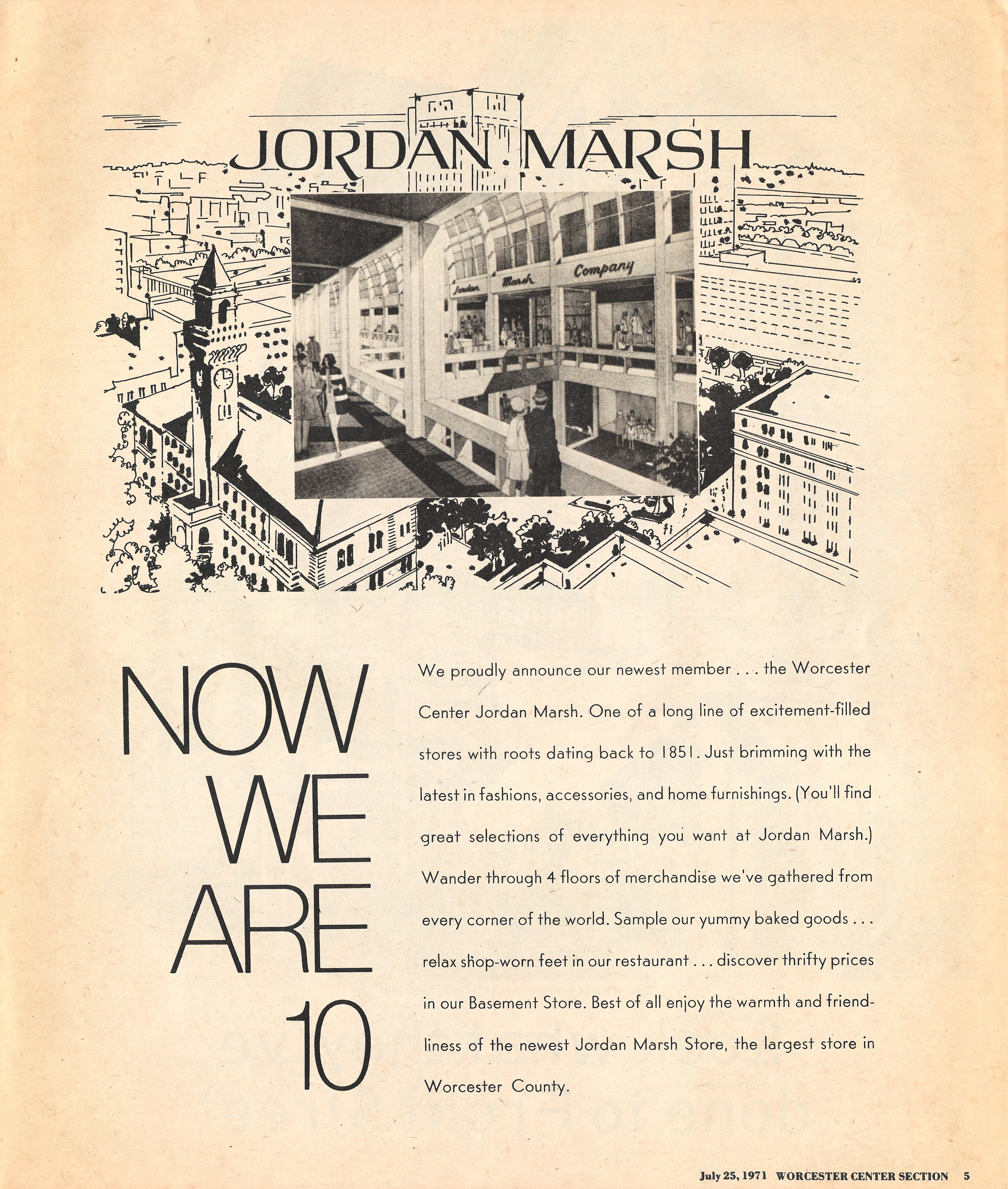
A Jordan Marsh advertisement in the Telegram & Gazette in Worcester, Massachusetts, in 1971

In 1949, after the addition of the new building, the Jordan Marsh Complex was split into four distinct units: the 1949 new store, the original main store, annex, and bristol building. The Boston Redevelopment Authority estimated the complex's total retail space at 1,700,000 sq ft (160,000 m^{2}), which made it the largest retail venue in Boston. At the same time, the company began moving into the suburbs. Jordan Marsh constructed its first branch stores in older suburban communities in the 1940s. By 1966, branch stores accounted for half of all department store sales.

Shopper's World shopping mall opened in Framingham, Massachusetts on October 4, 1951, and was one of the nation's earliest suburban shopping malls with Jordan Marsh standing at the mall's southern end as its sole anchor. It was the first mall-styled Jordan Marsh in the country and was unmistakable for its large white dome. The dome was visible from the air and was used on aeronautical charts as a visual reporting point for aircraft approaching Boston's Logan Airport. It was reputed to be the third-largest in diameter unsupported dome in the world after St. Peter's Basilica in Rome and St. Paul's Cathedral in London. Shopper's World quickly became the most recognizable Jordan Marsh outside its flagship store in Boston. Jordan Marsh also opened a San Diego branch around the same time as the Florida stores in 1956, which occupied the former Sears store in downtown San Diego. The San Diego branch underperformed the Florida branches and was closed in 1958.

The main building of Boston's Jordan Marsh complex, an ornate brownstone edifice with a landmark corner clock tower designed by Nathaniel J. Bradlee in the 1860s, was torn down in 1975, along with its entire row of historic annex buildings. Local architect Leslie Larson founded a coalition called the City Conservation League to try to save the main building, which made way for a low modern brick structure that sits there today as Macy's. Some outraged customers cut up their credit cards in protest of the demolition. The protests and preservationist grassroots efforts led to the creation of the Boston Landmarks Commission.

=== Acquisition of Allied ===
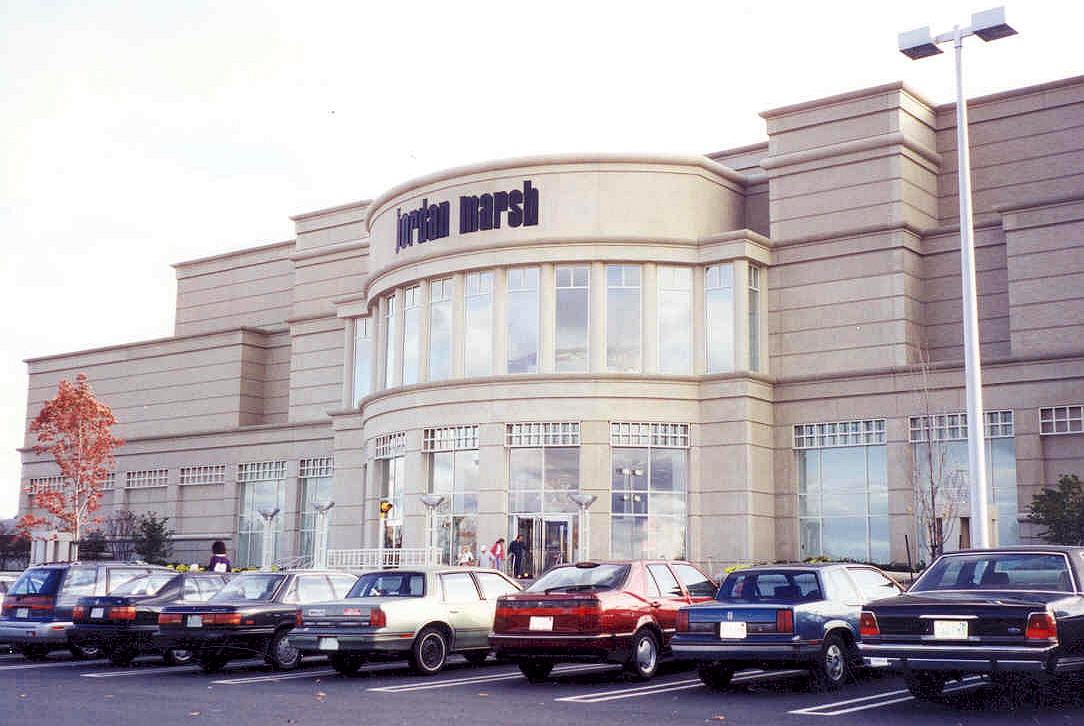
Jordan Marsh at Natick Mall in Natick, Massachusetts, which replaced the store at Shoppers' World in Framingham

In 1986, the Canadian Campeau Corporation acquired Allied Stores Corporation, which was reorganized under the merger agreement. In February 1987, Campeau merged D.M. Read Co. of Bridgeport, Connecticut, into Jordan Marsh, and merged Jordan Marsh Florida with Maas Brothers of Tampa, Florida, as the new Maas Brothers/Jordan Marsh Florida division.

In 1988, Campeau Corporation acquired Federated Department Stores. To consolidate with Federated, Allied's New York headquarters moved to Cincinnati.

In 1990, saddled by debt resulting from the highly leveraged Campeau takeover of Federated, both Federated and Allied filed for bankruptcy. Campeau Corp. U.S., Inc., was renamed Federated Stores, Inc. The following year, in 1991, the operations of Jordan Marsh Florida and Maas Brothers were absorbed by Burdines in 1991.

In February 1992, a new public company, Federated Department Stores, Inc., emerged, and Allied Stores Corporation was merged into it. A consolidation of the A&S and Jordan Marsh divisions resulted in the A&S/Jordan Marsh division, headquartered in Brooklyn, New York.

=== Conversion to Macy's ===
In 1994, the A&S/Jordan Marsh division merged with Macy's East, and the A&S stores were renamed Macy's in 1995. In 1996, Jordan Marsh stores in the Northeast U.S., which were already part of Macy's East division, were converted to Macy's name and branding.

== Enchanted Village ==
From the 1940s until 1972 and again in the early 1990s, Jordan Marsh's flagship store in Downtown Crossing in Boston was home to Enchanted Village, a Christmas display which at its height consumed an entire floor of the department store and was spotlighted in the store's display windows. The display's centerpiece, besides Santa Claus, was an eight-set Lionel electric train display. In what started as a marketing gimmick, Enchanted Village quickly became a Boston tradition and an annual mainstay of the city's holiday season.

In 1998, Macy's discontinued Enchanted Village when it was moved to City Hall Plaza. More recently, it was housed in the Hynes Convention Center.

On June 16, 2009, Enchanted Village, including all its props and figures was sold at auction, after the City of Boston said it no longer could afford to sponsor the annual event. Enchanted Village was subsequently sold to Jordan's Furniture, a unit of Warren Buffett's Berkshire Hathaway with no connection to the former Jordan Marsh, and is on display in Avon, Massachusetts during the holiday season.

== Jordan Marsh Florida ==
Jordan Marsh Florida

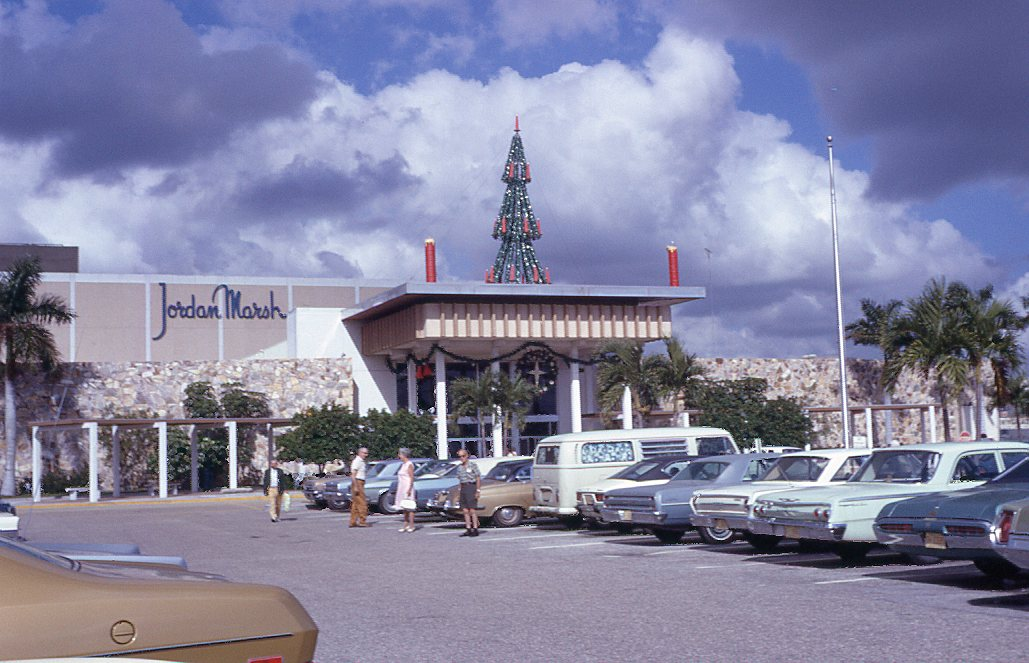
- Exterior of the former Jordan Marsh store at Palm Beach Mall in West Palm Beach (1971)
- Trade name: Jordan Marsh
- Type: Division
- Founded: 1956; 70 years ago in Miami, Florida, United States
- Defunct: October 20, 1991; 35 years ago
- Fate: Bankruptcy by Allied, acquisition by Federated
- Successor: Burdines
- Headquarters: Miami, Florida, United States
- Number of locations: 13 (at peak)
- Parent: Allied Stores

Allied opened the first Jordan Marsh store in Florida on Biscayne Boulevard in downtown Miami in 1956. It competed with Burdines in this market, which successfully pursued acquisition by Federated Department Stores for capital investment to compete with Jordan Marsh. It was comparatively more upmarket than local competition; the regional flagship store in Miami, advertised as "the store with everything, with a Florida flair", featured a swimming pool and boating dock to attract affluent customers. Allied operated the Jordan Marsh Florida division separately from the New England stores, and it expanded to 13 stores in the state.

The economic decline in the Florida market, paired with the financial difficulties Allied experienced during Campeau ownership, contributed to Allied's 1990 bankruptcy and 1992 acquisition by Federated. Jordan Marsh Florida, Tampa-based Maas Brothers, and Burdines were merged into a single division, and all were converted to Burdines on October 20, 1991. Burdines was co-branded as Burdines–Macy's in 2003 and fully converted to Macy's in 2005, and ultimately experienced the same fate as the New England stores.

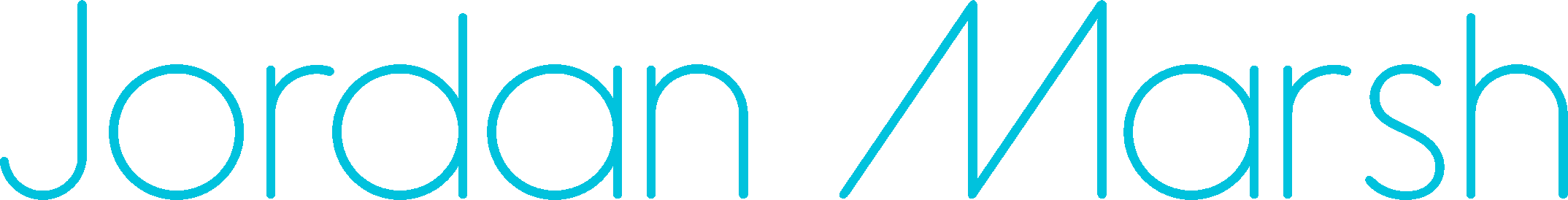
Jordan Marsh Department Store FL Final Logo

== See also ==
- List of defunct department stores of the United States
- List of department stores converted to Macy's
- Adriatic Mills, a textile mill in Worcester, Massachusetts that was owned by Jordan Marsh
- Filene's, another deparrment store chain based in Boston that was acquired by Federated and converted to Macy's
- Jordan Hall, a concert hall in Boston that was built with major funding from one of the Jordan family
- Jordan Marsh Co. v. Commissioner
