= Ashley Buchanan =

American business executive (born 1974)

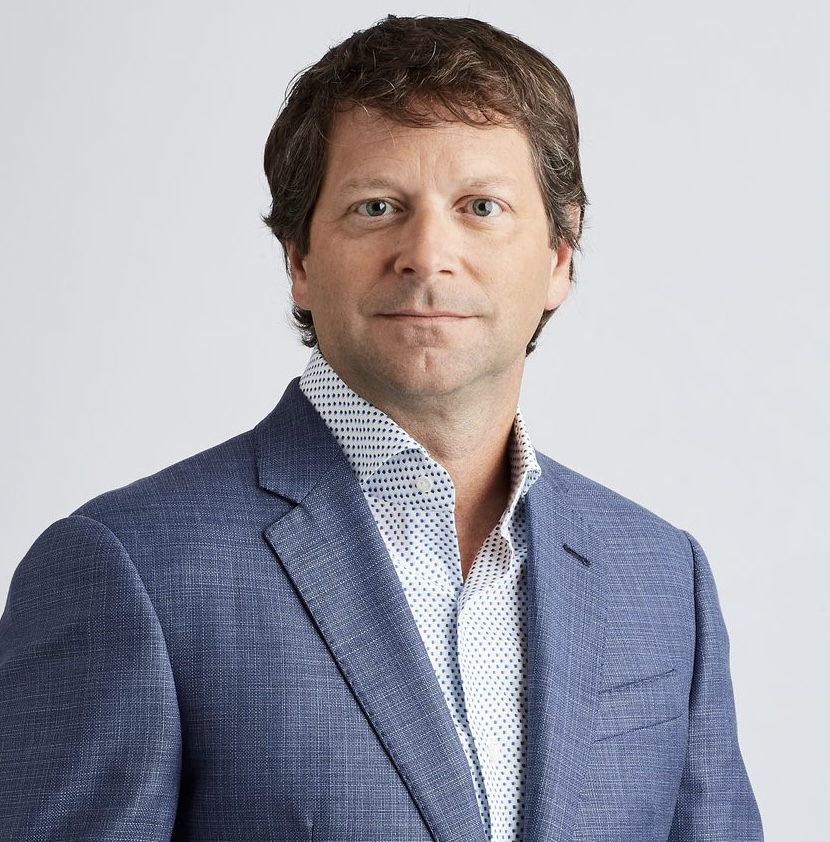
- Born: 1974 (age 51–52); Mount Pleasant, Texas, United States
- Education: Baylor University (BBA, MBA)
- Occupations: CEO, business executive

J. Ashley Buchanan (born 1974) is an American business executive. He was CEO of Kohl's from January to May 2025, before he was fired just over 100 days into his tenure due to unethical conduct. Prior to that, he was CEO of The Michaels Companies and chief merchandising officer and chief operating officer of Walmart's e-commerce business.

== Early life and education ==
Buchanan was born in 1974 in Mount Pleasant, Texas. He is the eldest of three children born to Patricia (Patti) and James Buchanan, a businessman. He attended college at Baylor University where he studied business and played tennis on the university's NCAA Division I tennis team. Buchanan graduated from the Hankamer School of Business in 1996 with a Bachelor of Business Administration in finance and real estate. Buchanan received a Master of Business Administration degree from Hankamer School of Business in 1998.

== Relationships ==
He has a wife, Lesley, and three children. Divorce proceedings were initiated in 2022, though it is not known whether the divorce was finalized.

He is involved in a romantic relationship with Chandra Holt.

== Career ==
=== Early career ===
Buchanan started his career in banking at Bank of America in 1996. After receiving his Master of Business Administration degree, Buchanan worked as a retail consultant at Accenture from 1996 to 2004. He worked at Dell Computers from 2004 to 2007 as a finance manager.

=== Walmart ===
From 2007 to 2020, Buchanan worked at Walmart, starting with the first ten years at Walmart US leading several business units.

In February 2017, Buchanan was named chief merchant of Walmart's Sam's Club business unit.

In 2019, Buchanan was named executive vice president and chief merchandising officer of Walmart.com, where he was part of the effort to invest in Walmart's digital shopping experience, to compete with online giant Amazon.

=== Michaels ===
In 2020, Buchanan joined The Michaels Companies as the chief executive officer and a member of the board of directors.

In March 2021, it was announced that The Michaels Companies was being acquired by private equity firm Apollo Global Management, and would be going private.

=== Kohl's ===
In January 2025, Buchanan joined Kohl's as chief executive officer.

Soon after taking over at Kohl's, Buchanan brokered a deal for several Kohl's stores to sell products from K-cup coffee startup Incredibrew, headed by former Bed Bath & Beyond and Conn's HomePlus CEO Chandra Holt, a former colleague of Buchanan's at Walmart. A Kohl's employee expressed concerns about the terms of the deal during Kohl's normal vetting process for vendors. The employee believed the deal was too favorable to Incredibrew. Those concerns reached Kohl's board, who deemed them serious enough for an independent investigation. It emerged that Buchanan and Holt had been in a romantic relationship for several years, but Buchanan had not disclosed this to anyone at either Walmart, Michaels or Kohl's. The investigation also revealed that Buchanan had crafted a consulting agreement with Boston Consulting Group, where Holt was an adviser. When Kohl's chairman Michael Bender and an outside lawyer confronted Buchanan on April 30, Buchanan admitted the relationship.

Kohl's fired Buchanan the following day, saying that his failure to disclose his relationship with Holt violated company policies regarding conflicts of interest. In a filing with the Securities and Exchange Commission, Kohl's said that its investigation found Buchanan had cut a deal with Incredibrew on "highly unusual terms favorable to (Incredibrew)," and had also entered into a "multi-million dollar consulting agreement" with Boston Consulting Group. Kohl's deemed both cases as grounds to fire Buchanan for cause. Boston Consulting Group cut ties with Holt the same day. According to a number of experts, Kohl's board eschewed the guarded language normally used to announce departures of senior executives because it believed Buchanan was guilty of serious misconduct.

The firing was so abrupt that Buchanan's biography was not removed from Kohl's Website until that afternoon, hours after it announced his firing. White collar crime expert and former federal prosecutor Michael Epner suggested that Buchanan's lack of candor not only violated Kohl's internal regulations, but also may have fallen afoul of the Sarbanes-Oxley Act, which requires CEOs to disclose "related party" conflicts of interest when they sign their company's annual reports. In Buchanan's case, he arranged the Incredibrew deal before signing Kohl's 2024 annual report on March 20.

=== Other professional activities ===
Buchanan is also an independent director on the board of directors of private label packaged foods company TreeHouse Foods.
