= Handshake (company) =

American employment company

- Industry: Employment Website
- Founded: 2014; 12 years ago
- Founders: Garrett Lord; Ben Christensen; Scott Ringwelski
- Headquarters: San Francisco, California, United States
- Key people: Garrett Lord (CEO)
- Products: Career services
- Number of employees: 725 (2022)
- Website: joinhandshake.com

Handshake is an American employment website for job listings, primarily for college students, launched in 2014. The platform is designed to help students find jobs or internships.

== History ==
Handshake was launched in 2014 by three computer science students from Michigan Tech. The company developed a career services platform to help students and young alumni find internship and job opportunities. The idea behind the company came when the founders saw the opportunity gap they faced coming from a small engineering school, versus students from Ivy League or other schools that had more resources. In the 2014–2015 school year, they signed their first five college partners, who paid a small annual fee.

By February 2016, the company had raised $14 million, and reported that it was integrated into 60 universities, with 1.3 million profiles created.

In 2017, the three founders were featured in the Forbes 30 under 30 list for consumer tech.

In May 2021, the company raised an $80 million Series E that valued the company at $1.5 billion. At the time, Techcrunch reported that the Handshake platform had 18 million students and alumni from 1,200 educational institutions using the platform, along with 550,000 companies.

In January 2022, the company raised a $200 million Series F that valued the company at $3.5 billion. In April 2022, the company acquired European recruiting platform Talentspace.

== Business ==
The company makes its platform available to company recruiters, universities and other education institutions for a subscription fee. Recruiters log into Handshake and post positions to all or a subset of schools. Students can sign up for free accounts, create profiles and receive personalized job recommendations. The company also surveys its users to produce annual job trend reports. In 2025, it identified a decrease of interest in federal jobs, and also identified a declining number of posted internships on its job search platform.

As of February 2024, Garrett Lord is the company's CEO, and its headquarters is in San Francisco, California. As of 2022, the company had 725 employees.

Handshake's competitors include similar job boards like Indeed, 12Twenty, and Symplicity.

=== Vendor dispute involving Michigan State University ===
In 2023, during a contract renewal process with Michigan State University, Handshake became involved in a dispute with MSU’s then-executive director of career services, Jeff Beavers. According to The State News, Beavers allegedly proposed a quid-pro-quo to Handshake CEO Garrett Lord regarding a patent Beavers was associated with. Lord did not publicly comment on the meeting. Following the exchange, Handshake executives reported the incident to MSU administrators and requested Beavers be recused from the bidding process. The university subsequently ended its investigation without public findings. Beavers denied the allegations and accused Handshake of fabricating the story to protect its business interests. The details of the meeting remain disputed.
