= Emily Chang (journalist) =

American journalist (born 1980)

- 張秀春
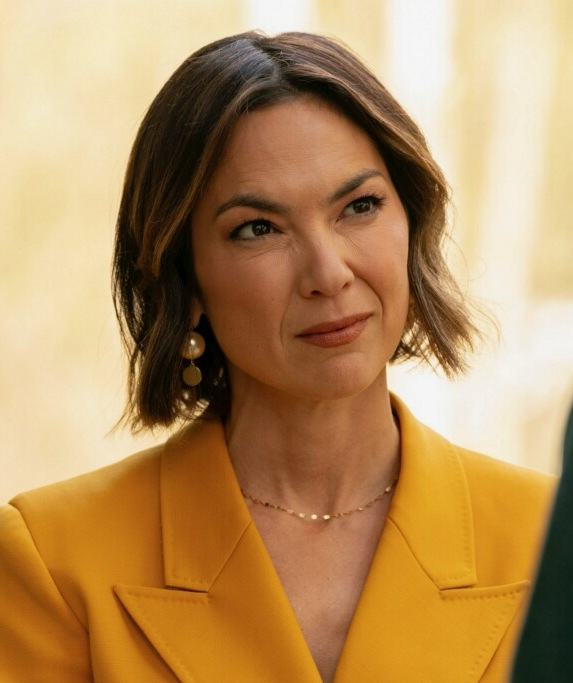
- Chang in 2025
- Born: Emily Chang; August 11, 1980 (age 46); Kailua, Hawaii, U.S.
- Education: Harvard University (BA)
- Occupation: Broadcast journalist
- Notable work: Brotopia (2018)
- Spouse: Jonathan Stull (m. 2010)
- Children: 4
- Awards: 5 regional Emmy Awards; 1 News & Documentary Emmy nomination

Chinese name
- Traditional Chinese: 張秀春
- Simplified Chinese: 张秀春
Transcriptions
Standard Mandarin
- Hanyu Pinyin: Zhāng Xiùchūn
- Bopomofo: ㄓㄤㄒㄧㄡˋㄔㄨㄣ

Emily Chang (born August 11, 1980) is an American journalist, television host, executive producer, and author. She was the anchor and executive producer of Bloomberg Technology for over a decade, a daily TV show focused on global technology, and Studio 1.0.

In 2023, Chang launched a show with Bloomberg Originals called The Circuit, where she interviews influencers in technology, business, entertainment, and culture. She is the author of Brotopia: Breaking Up the Boys' Club of Silicon Valley, a book that explores gender inequality in the tech industry.

== Early life and education ==
Chang was born in Kailua, Hawaii. She graduated from Punahou School in 1998. In 2002, she graduated magna cum laude from Harvard University with a Bachelor of Arts in social studies.

== Career ==
Chang started her career as a news producer at NBC in New York. She then worked as a reporter at KNSD in San Diego, California. While there, she won five Pacific Southwest Regional Emmy Awards for news writing and specialty reporting.

From 2007 to 2010, Chang served as an international correspondent for CNN, based in Beijing and London.

In Beijing, she reported on stories including the 2008 Summer Olympics, China's economic transformation and its environmental consequences, the 2008 South China floods, the aftermath of the 2008 Sichuan earthquake, and North Korea's nuclear ambitions. During President Obama's 2010 visit to Shanghai, Chang was briefly detained by the police for her coverage of the banned "Oba-Mao" T-shirt, which depicted the American president dressed in iconic Red Army attire.

In London, she worked on CNN's American Morning. There, she covered European and international events, including the disappearance of Madeleine McCann. She had a one-on-one interview with Benazir Bhutto, former prime minister of Pakistan, weeks before her assassination.

=== Bloomberg ===
In 2010, Chang joined Bloomberg Television. On February 28, 2011, she became the anchor of Bloomberg West, a daily show that features reporting and interviews with tech figures. In October 2016, the show was renamed Bloomberg Technology. Chang left Bloomberg Technology on November 10, 2022, after 12 years. In 2023, she launched The Circuit, a Bloomberg Originals series, where she interviews influential figures. An episode of The Circuit was nominated for a News and Documentary Emmy Award in 2025. It also received an award from the Northern California chapter of the Society of Professional Journalists in 2024 and an award for videography from the San Francisco Press Club.

Chang also hosted Bloomberg Television's long-form interview series Studio 1.0, where she interviewed tech leaders like Facebook founder Mark Zuckerberg and Apple CEO Tim Cook. In 2024, Chang hosted and executive-produced Posthuman with Emily Chang, a futuristic show about the impacts of rapid technological innovation, with Bloomberg Originals.

=== Writing ===
Chang is the author of Brotopia: Breaking Up the Boys' Club of Silicon Valley, published in February 2018 by Portfolio Books, a division of Penguin Random House. The book investigates alleged sexism and gender inequality in Silicon Valley. The PBS News Hour/New York Times book club selected Brotopia as their April 2019 read.

== Personal life ==
In 2010, Chang married Jonathan DeWees Stull, president of the career services startup Handshake, in Haleʻiwa, Hawaii. They have four children. Chang appeared as herself in six episodes across three seasons of the HBO comedy show Silicon Valley, in which she interviewed various characters.
