= Brotopia =

2018 book by Emily Chang

Brotopia: Breaking Up the Boys' Club of Silicon Valley
- First edition cover
- Author: Emily Chang
- Audio read by: Emily Chang
- Language: English
- Subject: Sexism in Silicon Valley
- Publisher: Portfolio
- Publication date: February 6, 2018
- Publication place: United States
- Media type: Print (hardcover and paperback), e-book, audiobook
- Pages: 320
- ISBN: 978-0-7352-1353-1 (hardcover)
- OCLC: 1027011182
- Dewey Decimal: 331.4/1330979473
- LC Class: HD6060.5.U5 C52 2018
- Website: www.brotopiabook.com

Brotopia: Breaking Up the Boys' Club of Silicon Valley is a 2018 nonfiction book by Emily Chang. It is her debut book and was published on February 6, 2018, by Portfolio, a division of Penguin Random House. The book investigates and examines sexism and gender inequality in the technology industry of Silicon Valley.

== Background ==
Chang drew from over two hundred interviews she conducted across the technology industry. Some of the interviews were from her work at Bloomberg, but most were original and conducted for the purposes of the book.

== Publication and promotion ==
Vanity Fair ran an excerpt from the book in their January 2018 issue titled ""Oh My God, This Is So F---ed Up": Inside Silicon Valley's Secretive, Orgiastic Dark Side". Bloomberg Businessweek ran an excerpt in February 2018 titled "Women Once Ruled the Computer World. When Did Silicon Valley Become Brotopia?".

Brotopia was published on February 6, 2018, by Portfolio, a division of Penguin Random House.

Coverage of the book ran in The New York Times, The New York Times Book Review, San Francisco Chronicle, Financial Times, TechCrunch and The Verge.

Chang appeared on Morning Joe, Good Morning America, CBS This Morning and Marketplace to discuss the book.

The PBS Newshour-New York Times "Now Read This" book club selected Brotopia as their April 2019 book club read. Chang appeared on the PBS Newshour on April 30, 2019, and answered questions from viewers about the book.

== Reception ==
Kirkus Reviews called the book a "thorough, important examination" of Silicon Valley, writing, "Chang's scrutiny breaks open a wide doorway, allowing fresh ideas about a tainted industry to circulate and spark discussions."

The book was longlisted for the 2018 Financial Times Business Book of the Year Award and was named one of TechCrunch's best tech books of 2018.

=== Criticism ===
The book has faced criticism for its reliance on anecdotal evidence over statistical or causal analysis. In a review for Quillette, software engineer Sean Welsh argued that "such argument as the book offers is colourful mud-slinging on the basis of anecdotes" and that it "does not support its claims with any statistical or causal analysis." Welsh contended that Chang shows "no awareness that gender parity is the exception not the rule in the US workplace," and that documented psychological research on sex differences in occupational preferences (such as systemizing versus empathizing traits) offers more explanatory power for tech's gender imbalances than a deliberate "boys' club."

Elon Musk, featured in a Vanity Fair excerpt from the book about a Silicon Valley party, publicly rejected the portrayal. Musk told Wired that Chang's reporting was "salacious nonsense," accusing her of conflating San Francisco sex clubs with "boring VC parties on the Peninsula." He described the specific party he attended as "boring and corporate, with zero sex or nudity anywhere," calling it "nerds on a couch" rather than the "cuddle puddle" depicted.
