= Filene =

Filene may refer to:

- Filene Research Institute, a consumer finance company
- Filene's, an American department store chain
- Filene's Basement, a department store company
- Filene's Department Store, a department store in Boston, Massachusetts
- Abraham Lincoln Filene (1865–1957), American businessman and philanthropist
- Catherine Filene Shouse (1896–1994), American researcher and philanthropist
- Edward Filene (1860–1937), American businessman and philanthropist
- SS Edward A. Filene, an American liberty ship
