= Shouse =

Shouse may refer to:

== People ==
- Brian Shouse (born 1968), American baseball player
- Catherine Filene Shouse (1896–1994), American researcher and philanthropist
- Danny Shouse (born 1958), American-Icelandic basketball player
- Dexter Shouse (born 1963), American basketball player
- Jouett Shouse (1879–1968), American lawyer, newspaper publisher, and politician
- Justin Shouse (born 1981), American-Icelandic basketball player and coach

== Other uses ==
- Shouse (duo), an electronic music duo
- Shouse, a type of housing that combines a house with a workshop
