= International Children's Festival at Wolf Trap =

Youth-oriented festival

Coordinates: 38.93698°N 77.26197°W

The International Children's Festival at Wolf Trap was a youth-oriented festival dedicated to the performing, visual, and interactive arts. The festival is held each September at Wolf Trap National Park for the Performing Arts in Fairfax County, Virginia, which is the United States' only national park devoted solely to the performing arts. First conceived in 1971 as "International Children's Day", the festival provides opportunities for children to share aspects of their culture through the arts. The idea and impetus for the festival came from Joan C. Blair, also on the Fairfax County Arts Council. She convinced the founder of the Wolf trap National Park for Performing Arts, Catherine Filene Shouse, to support the festival.

The International Children's Festival is sponsored by the Arts Council of Fairfax County in cooperation with the Wolf Trap Foundation for the Performing Arts and the National Park Service. Proceeds from the annual festival support the educational programs and services of the Arts Council of Fairfax County. It is held annually in September, typically on the 3rd weekend of the month. By the end of 2011, it was decided to conclude the tradition, amid financial issues.

== Performances ==
The two-day weekend festival features many performers from several countries in musical and dance performances in four stages representative of their cultural heritage. The performers are dressed in traditional clothing and play many traditional songs which they dance to. Also featured are an Arts and Technology Pavilion with hands-on technology stations, international experiential tents where attendees can meet the international performers, learn the moves they saw on stage, and participate in craft projects to help them learn about international culture, and the Creative Kids Workshop featuring pavilions for hands-on arts projects and an instrument petting zoo.

== Curriculum ==
An educational curriculum co-developed by the Arts Council of Fairfax County and Fairfax County Public Schools supports the learning opportunities available to students at the International Children's Festival. The curriculum is directed toward fifth grade classes and is also available for home-school and private school programs.

Each year since 1994, the Festival has been the designated fine arts field trip for the entire 5th grade population in Fairfax County Public Schools – resulting in over 13,000 students coming to Wolf Trap during the week to see and meet the featured performers. The year 2001 was a particularly interesting year for the festival as thousands of students were en route to Wolf Trap when the events of September 11, 2001 took place.

== Community involvement ==
The Festival includes not only the featured international performers, but also dozens of Fairfax County and Washington DC metropolitan area arts organizations. In total, the festival features over 400 area performing and visual artists representing a diverse range of art forms, genres, and cultures. With the assistance of the community, each year free tickets, gifts, and snacks are provided to nearly 2,000 Washington DC area children and their families who would otherwise be unable to attend.

The International Children's Festival relies on over 3,500 volunteer hours from 700 volunteers from local corporations and service organizations. Volunteers for the actual festival must be at least 16 years of age and available to work a 3.5-hour shift.

For over 15 years, Bob McGrath from Sesame Street acted as host and consultant to the International Children's Festival.
