= Wolf Trap Foundation for the Performing Arts =

American nonprofit organization

- Named after: Wolf Trap Farm
- Established: November 5, 1968
- Founder: Catherine Filene Shouse
- Type: 501(c)(3)
- Purpose: Arts
- Location: Vienna, Virginia
- Key people: Arvind Manocha, President and CEO
- Website: Wolf Trap Foundation for the Performing Arts

Wolf Trap Foundation for the Performing Arts is a nonprofit organization, established in 1968 by Catherine Filene Shouse. It oversees the programming and operations for Wolf Trap National Park for the Performing Arts in Fairfax County, Virginia, as well as the independent venues, performance spaces, and education programs. The Foundation does not oversee the surrounding park grounds, which is in the jurisdiction of the National Park Service.

== History ==
Catherine Filene Shouse donated land for Wolf Trap National Park for the Performing Arts in the 1960s in coordination with the United States government. The federal government used 100 acres of Shouse's land toward a national park for the performing arts, in addition to other land it seized through eminent domain for a Dulles Airport access road. Shouse also donated more than $2 million for an outdoor stage.

In 1966, Congress approved the national park's creation, which officially opened in 1971. As part of the agreement, the National Park Service (NPS) would maintain the land and the Foundation would operate the park.

The government-owned Filene Center, overseen by the Foundation, was destroyed in a fire in 1982, so Congress issued $17 million in loans and grants to cover the cost of rebuilding. The Foundation raised another $7 million over the two years that followed, which was intended to repay the loan but was spent on covering cost overruns. A new payment agreement was issued in 1990 for a 25-year repayment period.

The Foundation raised $75 million in a fundraising campaign that started in 2021 for its 50th anniversary. At the end of the 2023 season, the Foundation began construction on general facilities improvement and a new facility called Meadow Commons, funded by the 2021 campaign. It replaced the old concession stand and added picnic terraces, accessibility upgrades, and upgraded bathrooms; it opened in May 2024.

== Operations ==
Wolf Trap Foundation for the Performing Arts is a private 501(c)(3) organization that manages the performing arts and education programs at the Wolf Trap National Park for the Performing Arts, The Barns at Wolf Trap, and throughout the country. It does not oversee the surrounding park grounds, which is in the jurisdiction of the NPS. The Foundation has an annual budget separate from the NPS. Arvind Manocha is the president and chief executive officer. The board had 50 directors in 2024. The Foundation's headquarters is the Center for Education at Wolf Trap building, which opened in 2003. The Foundation operates the Filene Center, Meadow Stage, Children's Theatre-in-the-Woods and The Barns at Wolf Trap. The federal government owns the Wolf Trap amphitheater, the Filene Center, and surrounding park.

=== The Barns at Wolf Trap ===
Wolf Trap Foundation owns and operates The Barns at Wolf Trap. The venue hosts year-round performances, including the annual Chamber Music at The Barns and performances by Wolf Trap Opera. The annual chamber music series at The Barns was established in 1986. The series is a venue for performances in a small setting. The Barns at Wolf Trap are made up of two restored 18th-century barns with a maximum capacity of 382 people. One of those barns was first constructed in Blenheim, New York, in 1725 and the second in 1791 in Jackson, New York. 255 years after the first barn was built, Shouse had it dismantled, transported 400 miles to Virginia, and integrated with the 1791 structure.

== Programming ==
The Foundation is responsible for programming performances at Wolf Trap. Programming is year-round at the three venues, the Filene Center, The Barns at Wolf Trap, and Children's Theatre-in-the-Woods. By 2011, the summer season had about 100 shows. The Park hosts a range of musical performances, including ballet, opera, and orchestral concerts as well as Broadway musicals. The American Ballet Theatre and the National Symphony Orchestra have performed at the venue, as have a variety of artists such as Jon Batiste, The Beach Boys, John Legend, Demi Lovato, Lizzo, Dolly Parton, Diana Ross, and Sting. Its outdoor performances run in the summer from May to September. During the fall, winter, and spring, performances are presented at The Barns with its season running from October to May.

== Education and training ==
The Wolf Trap Foundation's education arm focuses on early childhood education, including the Institute for Early Learning through the Arts program. The program started in 1981. It shows teachers how to integrate the arts into the pre-kindergarten classrooms. It has 28 affiliate members including the United States and Singapore. This artist-in-residence program goes directly to the classrooms to train educators on integrating arts customized for their students.

The American Institutes for Research conducted a study which found a better grasp on math material in students taught by a Wolf Trap trained instructor versus other instructors.

The Foundation awards annual grants to performing arts educators teaching music, dance, or theater at public schools in the Washington, D.C. area. It also offers an internship that was included in Bloomberg Business Week's Best Places to Intern in 2009.

=== Wolf Trap Opera ===
Wolf Trap Opera is a training opera company for young artists. It is a summer residency program that began in 1971. Throughout the duration of the program, Wolf Trap Opera's class holds its performances at The Barns at Wolf Trap. Kim Pensinger Witman had been the head of Wolf Trap Opera as its senior director since 1997 and retired in 2019. Lee Anne Myslewski succeeded Witman.

Under Witman, Wolf Trap Opera was nominated for the 2009 52nd Annual Grammy Awards for Best Opera Recording. The nomination was for a modern adaptation of the opera Volpone and was conducted by Sara Jobin.

The opera includes Filene Artists and Studio Artists for its six-week training program. The former are emerging professionals who have completed their studies and the latter are those enrolled or recently graduated from voice programs. The studio artist program began in 2007 and targets younger singers. The program trains its members with an Artist Development Advisor and an Artist-in-Residence, who include alumni of the program and industry-recognized artists, such as Grammy award winners. A significant amount of modern leading opera singers are alumni of the program.
