= Teresa Carlson =

American business executive

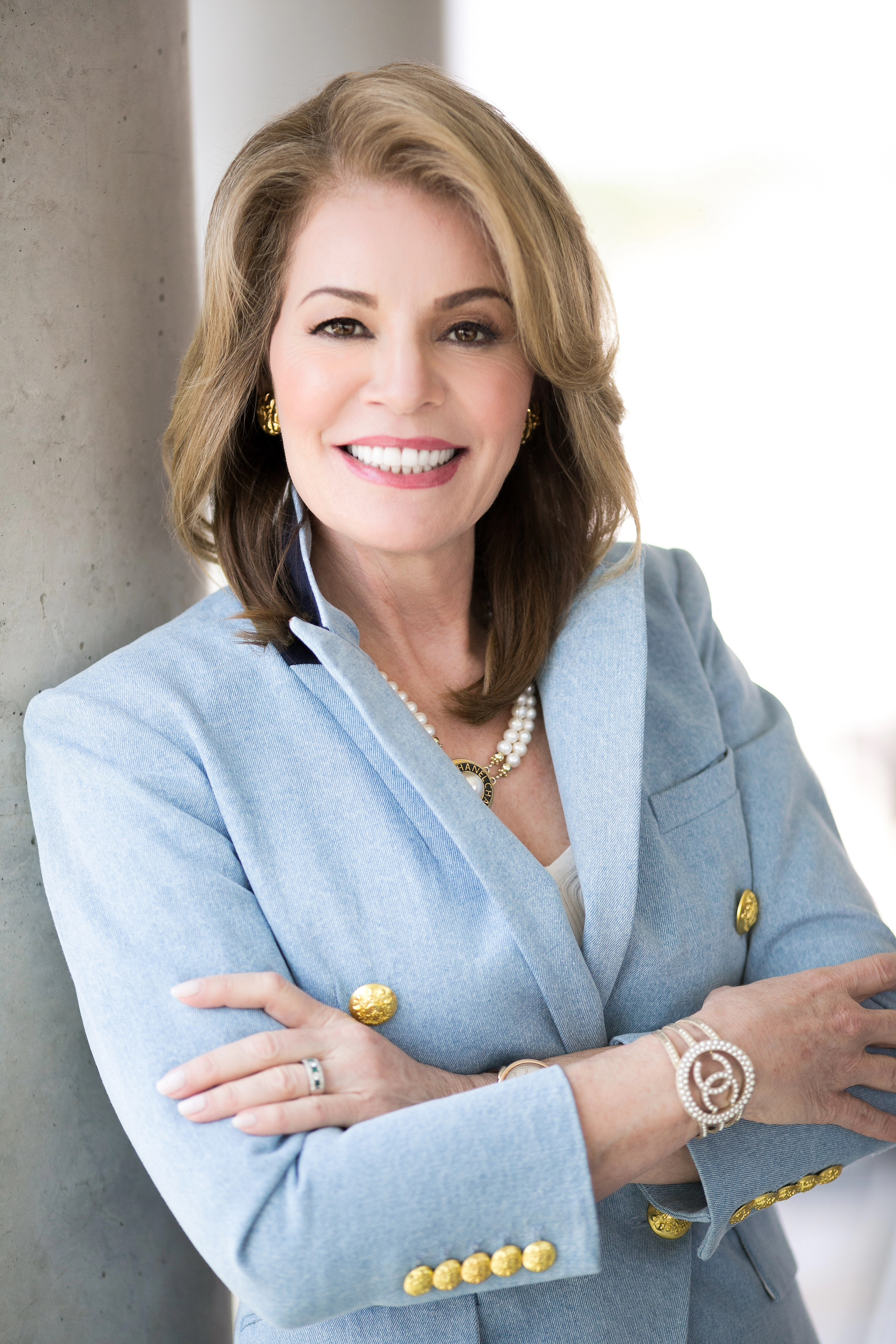
- Carlson in 2018
- Born: Nancy, Kentucky, U.S.
- Education: Western Kentucky University (BS, MS)
- Title: Founding President of General Catalyst Institute
- Children: 2
- Website: Teresa Carlson on X

Teresa Carlson is the Founding President of General Catalyst Institute, the public policy arm of a Massachusetts-based venture capital firm. Prior to this she served as Corporate Vice President and Executive-in-Residence at Microsoft and the Non-Executive Chair of KnightSwan, a special-purpose acquisition company. Previously she held the position of President and Chief Growth Officer of Splunk and Vice President for Amazon Web Services' worldwide public sector and industries businesses. Prior to working for Amazon, Carlson was Microsoft's Vice President of Federal Government business.

== Education ==
Carlson was born in Somerset, Kentucky. She graduated from Western Kentucky University with a bachelor's degree in communications and a master's in speech and language pathology.

== Early career ==
Early in her career, Carlson worked in health management consulting at NovaCare Corp, and then at KeyFile Corp., a document and workflow management company. At Lexign Inc., she led the company's relaunch after a merger in her role as worldwide vice president of marketing and business development. In 2002, Carlson began working at Microsoft. She eventually became vice president in charge of Microsoft's $1.7 billion federal business, before departing for Amazon Web Services in December 2010.

== Amazon Web Services ==
At Amazon Web Services, Carlson founded the company's public sector business in the role of vice president of worldwide public sector operations. She is also the head public policy advisor for the public sector business. Her work includes traveling to meet with government leaders and academic administrators to promote cloud computing. She has also created diversity initiatives at Amazon for women and minorities working in the technology industry and has partnered with academic institutions on programs to prepare students for careers in technology. In 2013, Carlson oversaw a deal for Amazon Web Services to provide cloud services to the Central Intelligence Agency.

In March 2020, Carlson led Amazon Web Services to launch the Diagnostic Development Initiative to aid in the development of coronavirus diagnostic tools. By 2020, she had grown the public sector business to include more than 5,000 government agencies, 10,000 education institutions, and 28,000 nonprofit organizations as its clients. That same year, her role expanded to add regulated industries like healthcare, financial services, energy services, utilities and telecommunications to her responsibilities. In June 2020, Amazon Web Services created a new unit for aerospace and satellite customers under Carlson's leadership.

In April 2021, Carlson announced she would be leaving Amazon Web Services to become president and chief growth officer of Splunk.

Carlson is on both for-profit and nonprofit boards, including incident management platform PagerDuty, healthcare platform developer Commure and nonprofits including the International Centre for Missing and Exploited Children, Wolf Trap Foundation for the Performing Arts, The Economic Club of Washington, DC, and the White House Historical Association.

== Honors ==
Fast Company included Carlson in its 2010 list of the most influential women in technology. Washingtonian named her one of Washington state's 100 most powerful women in 2011 and included her in its 2019 Tech Titans list. Federal Computer Week included her in its 2013 Federal 100 list and gave her one of its Eagle awards in the same year.

In 2014, she was ranked #24 by Business Insider in its list of the most important people in cloud computing. In 2016, she received an Ellis Island Medal of Honor.

Carlson was named Executive of the Year in 2016 for companies greater than $300 million by the Greater Washington GovCon Awards, which is administered by the Northern Virginia Chamber of Commerce.

== Personal life ==
Carlson is married and has two children.
