= Jouett Shouse =

American politician (1879–1968)

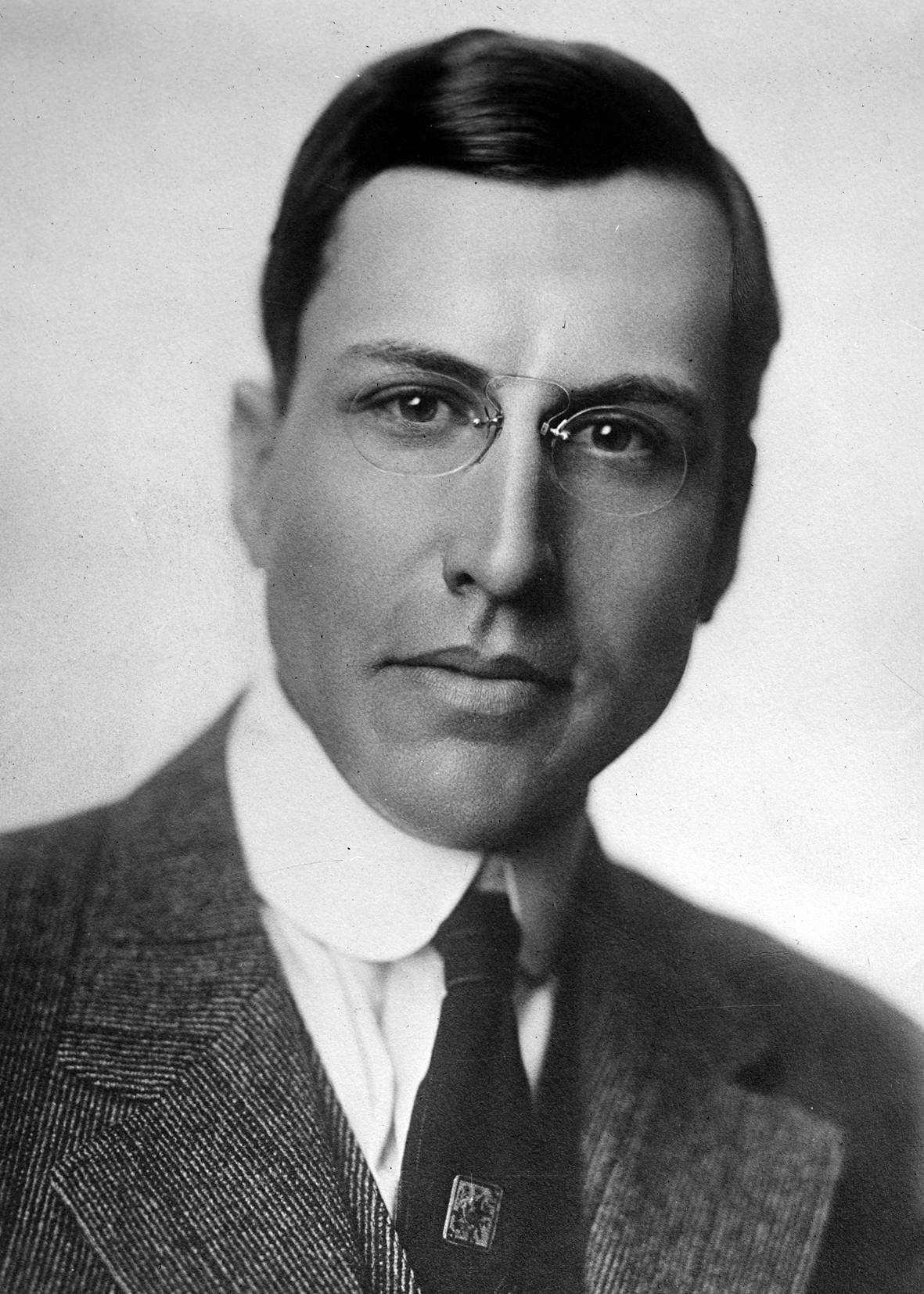

Member of the U.S. House of Representatives from Kansas's 7th district
- In office March 4, 1915 – March 3, 1919
- Preceded by: George Neeley
- Succeeded by: Jasper N. Tincher

Personal details
- Born: December 10, 1879 Midway, Kentucky, U.S.
- Died: June 2, 1968 (aged 88) Lexington, Kentucky, U.S.
- Party: Democratic
- Spouses: Marion Edwards (div. 1931); Catherine Filene Dodd (m. 1931)
- Children: 3
- Education: University of Missouri

Jouett Shouse (December 10, 1879 – June 2, 1968) was an American lawyer, publisher, and politician. A Democrat, he was a member of the United States House of Representatives from Kansas.

== Early life ==
Shouse was born on December 10, 1879, in Midway, Kentucky. In 1892, his family moved to Mexico, Missouri, where he attended public school. After studying at the University of Missouri at Columbia he returned to his native Kentucky where he served on the staff of the Lexington Herald from 1898 to 1904 and eventually became the owner/editor of The Kentucky Farmer and Breeder.

In 1911, Shouse moved to Kinsley, Kansas, where he married. He became involved in agricultural and livestock businesses and served on the board of directors of the director of the Kinsley Bank. He was elected a state senator in 1913 then in 1915 was elected to the United States Congress where he served until 1919 when President Woodrow Wilson appointed him as Assistant Secretary of the Treasury. At the Treasury Department, he was in charge of customs and internal revenue, and reorganized the War Risk Insurance division until November 15, 1920, when he resigned "in order to adjust his personal affairs".

Shouse was a member of the Democratic Party and was appointed chairman of the executive committee of the Democratic National Committee in May 1929. His powerful position in Washington politics led to him being on the cover of the November 10, 1930 issue of TIME magazine. He opposed the nomination of Franklin D. Roosevelt as the Democratic Party's candidate for president and along with John J. Raskob supported the candidacy of Alfred E. Smith.

In the early 1930s, Shouse divorced his wife of twenty-one years and married Catherine Filene Dodd, a wealthy divorcee. A native of Boston, Massachusetts, the new Mrs. Shouse was a daughter of A. Lincoln Filene, head of Filene's department stores. She would serve on the board of trustees of the Filene Foundation. After their marriage, Jouett and Catherine Shouse took in and brought up a boy whom they renamed William Filene Shouse.

== Liberty League ==
After Roosevelt's election, Shouse left his leadership position to become president of the Association Against the Prohibition Amendment. That organization played an important role in bringing about the repeal of prohibition in 1933. In this campaign, Shouse worked together with Roosevelt's people.

Shouse broke with the liberals and became the president of the American Liberty League, 1934–40, a new conservative organization formed by leading businessmen to oppose parts of the New Deal. Roosevelt received him in the White House for a generous amount of discussion concerning the group's values and concerns, and he left Shouse charmed. Later, however, Roosevelt told the press that Shouse's organization put "too much stress on property rights, too little on human rights." The League, he said, was sworn to "uphold two of the Ten Commandments".

Regarding the controversial National Recovery Administration, Shouse was ambivalent. He commented that "the NRA has indulged in unwarranted excesses of attempted regulation"; on the other hand, he added that "in many regards [the NRA] has served a useful purpose." Shouse said that he had "deep sympathy" with the goals of the NRA, explaining, "While I feel very strongly that the prohibition of child labor, the maintenance of a minimum wage and the limitation of the hours of work belong under our form of government in the realm of the affairs of the different states, yet I am entirely willing to agree that in the case of an overwhelming national emergency the Federal Government for a limited period should be permitted to assume jurisdiction of them."

When Roosevelt died and Harry S. Truman became president, Shouse became one of his "unofficial advisers," columnist Drew Pearson reported in June 1947. He said Shouse was "sometimes described as having 'the finest 1923 mind in Washington'." Later that year, he predicted that a Republican, probably New York Gov. Thomas E. Dewey, would defeat Truman in 1948, and that he personally favored Sen. Arthur Vandenberg. He supported Republican Dwight D. Eisenhower for president in 1952 and 1956.

Shouse practiced law in Kansas City, Missouri as well as in Washington, D.C. In 1953, he was appointed chairman of the board of directors of New York City-based Anton Smit and Co. Inc., an industrial-diamond company that is now part of 3M.

== Thoroughbred horse racing ==
According to a 1916 article in The New York Times, for many years Shouse was actively engaged in promoting the Thoroughbred interests of Kentucky. Shouse and his second wife, Catherine, owned Wolf Trap Farm in Vienna, Virginia, where they raised and bred boxer dogs as well as Thoroughbred horses used as show hunters and for competing in flat racing. A part of the farm was later donated by Mrs. Shouse to become the site of the Wolf Trap National Park for the Performing Arts.

Shouse retired in 1965 and died in 1968. He is buried in the Lexington Cemetery in Lexington, Kentucky.

U.S. House of Representatives
| Preceded by George Neeley | Member of the U.S. House of Representatives from Kansas's 7th congressional district 1915–1919 | Succeeded by Jasper N. Tincher |
