= SS Edward A. Filene =

Liberty ship of WWII

History

United States
- Name: Edward A. Filene
- Namesake: Edward A. Filene
- Owner: War Shipping Administration (WSA)
- Operator: American West African Line, Inc.
- Ordered: as type (EC2-S-C1) hull, MC hull 2472
- Awarded: 23 April 1943
- Builder: St. Johns River Shipbuilding Company, Jacksonville, Florida
- Cost: $1,157,453
- Yard number: 36
- Way number: 6
- Laid down: 9 February 1944
- Launched: 6 April 1944
- Sponsored by: Catherine Filene Shouse
- Completed: 20 April 1944
- Identification: Call sign: KWUO
- Fate: Laid up in the, National Defense Reserve Fleet, Astoria, Oregon, 23 December 1948; Sold for nontransportation use, 30 December 1965, removed from fleet, 11 February 1966

General characteristics
- Class & type: Liberty ship; type EC2-S-C1, standard
- Tonnage: 10,865 LT DWT; 7,176 GRT
- Displacement: 3,380 long tons (3,434 t) (light); 14,245 long tons (14,474 t) (max)
- Length: 441 feet 6 inches (135 m) oa; 416 feet (127 m) pp; 427 feet (130 m) lwl
- Beam: 57 feet (17 m)
- Draft: 27 ft 9.25 in (8.4646 m)
- Installed power: 2 × Oil fired 450 °F (232 °C) boilers, operating at 220 psi (1,500 kPa); 2,500 hp (1,900 kW)
- Propulsion: 1 × triple-expansion steam engine, (manufactured by Filer and Stowell, Milwaukee, Wisconsin); 1 × screw propeller
- Speed: 11.5 knots (21.3 km/h; 13.2 mph)
- Capacity: 562,608 cubic feet (15,931 m^{3}) (grain); 499,573 cubic feet (14,146 m^{3}) (bale)
- Complement: 38–62 USMM; 21–40 USNAG
- Armament: Varied by ship; Bow-mounted 3-inch (76 mm)/50-caliber gun; Stern-mounted 4-inch (102 mm)/50-caliber gun; 2–8 × single 20-millimeter (0.79 in) Oerlikon anti-aircraft (AA) cannons and/or, 2–8 × 37-millimeter (1.46 in) M1 AA guns

SS Edward A. Filene was a Liberty ship built in the United States during World War II. She was named after Edward A. Filene, an American businessman and philanthropist. He is best known for building the Filene's department store chain and for his decisive role in pioneering credit unions across the United States.

== Construction ==
Edward A. Filene was laid down on 9 February 1944, under a Maritime Commission (MARCOM) contract, MC hull 2472, by the St. Johns River Shipbuilding Company, Jacksonville, Florida; she was sponsored by Catherine Filene Shouse, the niece of the namesake, and was launched on 6 April 1944.

== History ==
She was allocated to the American West African Line, Inc., on 20 April 1944. On 23 December 1948, she was laid up in the National Defense Reserve Fleet, Astoria, Oregon. On 28 July 1954, she was withdrawn from the fleet to be loaded with grain under the "Grain Program 1954", she returned loaded on 7 August 1954. On 9 December 1957, she was withdrawn to be unload, she returned on empty 13 December 1957. She was sold for nontransportation use, 30 December 1965, to Foss Launch and Tug Co., for $60,000. She was removed from the fleet on 11 February 1966. She was sunk at Cook Inlet, Alaska, as a breakwater and dock.

== Bibliography ==
- "St. John's River Shipbuilding, Jacksonville FL". www.ShipbuildingHistory.com. 16 October 2010.
- Maritime Administration. "Edward A. Filene". Ship History Database Vessel Status Card. U.S. Department of Transportation, Maritime Administration.
- Davies, James (May 2004). "Specifications (As-Built)" (PDF). p. 23.
- "SS Edward A. Filene".
