= Edward Filene =

American businessman and philanthropist

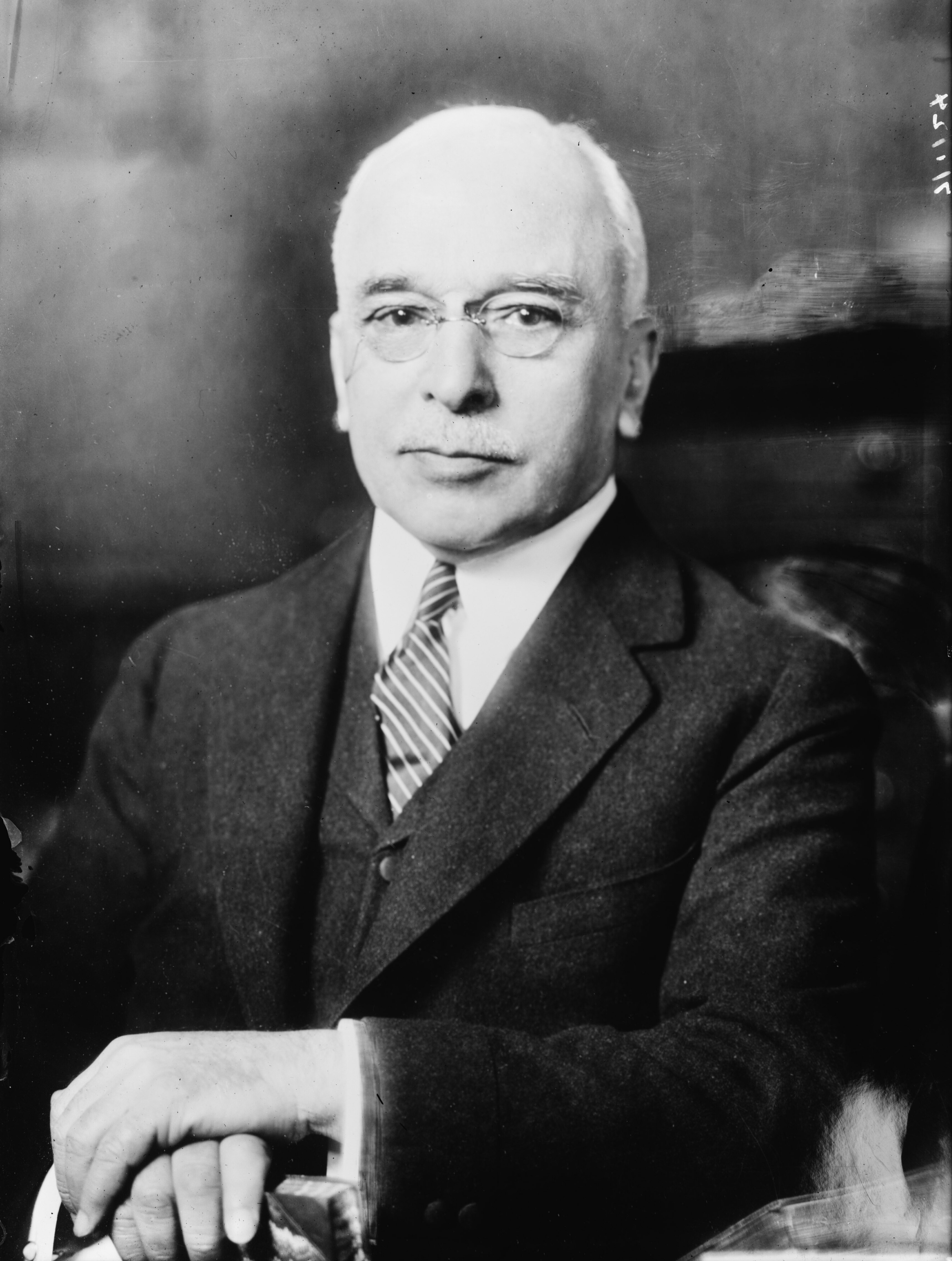
- Edward Filene in 1924
- Born: September 3, 1860; Salem, Massachusetts
- Died: September 26, 1937 (aged 77); Paris, France
- Occupations: Businessman; philanthropist
- Parent(s): William Filene, Clara Ballin
- Family: Abraham Lincoln Filene (brother)

Edward Albert Filene (September 3, 1860 – September 26, 1937) was an American businessman and philanthropist. He is best known for building the Filene's department store chain and for his decisive role in pioneering credit unions across the United States.

== Early life ==
Born in Salem, Massachusetts, Edward was one of five children of William Filene (born May 8, 1830) and Clara Ballin (born December 13, 1833). Both his parents were German Jewish immigrants, his father from Posen, Prussia, and his mother was born in Segnitz, Bavaria. William immigrated to the US in 1848 after abandoning law school in Berlin. Reputedly Edward Bernays claimed that William was born with the surname "Katz" but upon entry changed it to a misspelling of "Feline", though more likely it was the toponymic "Filehne", the German name of Wieleń a town 90km from Posen. It was some time in the 1850s that William and Clara met while Clara was visiting relatives in Hartford, Connecticut. They married in New York City. As "a peddler, chiefly of women's apparel" William built up a company composed of several small retail shops.

In 1865, at the age of 5, Edward was injured in a fall that left him with a permanent limp. Eczema plagued him throughout his life. In 1872, Clara Filene enrolled her three boys in the "Brüsselsche Handels und Erziehungsinstitut", a boarding school known for excellence in instruction and discipline in her Franconian hometown Segnitz-am-Main. The headmaster at that time, Samuel Spier, was one of the founding fathers of the early German democracy movement and an outspoken atheist; one of Edwards schoolmates was a certain Ettore Schmitz from Trieste who later became famous as the Italian writer Italo Svevo. Most of the pupils in Segnitz were the sons of German and Austrian Jewish entrepreneurs or merchants like, for instance, Edwards classmate Richard Fluss, a childhood friend of Sigmund Freud. But there were also some Christian schoolmates. The boys remained at the school until 1875, and it was a period of intense loneliness and homesickness for him as a young teenager. Filene was shy as a youth, and never married. Upon his return to the US, Edward attended high school in Lynn, Massachusetts, and worked in his father's store evenings, weekends, and summers.

== Work life ==
In 1881, when Edward was 21 years old, his father William founded a department store in Boston. Edward began traveling in the 1880s, purchasing merchandise, studying business practices, and increasingly examining how different societies were organized and the problems they faced. Edward had passed his entrance exams for Harvard University when in 1890 his father became seriously ill. Thirty years old at that time, Edward gave up his educational ambitions to take over the family business. One of his great disappointments in his life was being unable to attend Harvard.

Together with his younger brother Abraham Lincoln Filene, he reorganized his father's department store into "William Filene's Sons Company", which would later become Filene's. Though the store did not make a profit for many years, it attracted more customers, and eventually turned a profit, even supporting the main store of Filene's during the Great Depression.

By 1928 Edward was ousted from store management by his fellow stockholders who were "troubled by his liberal management policies", but retained an office and the title of President. His ouster allowed him to dedicate more time to his passions of travel, civic organizations, and philanthropy. He wrote numerous speeches, pamphlets and several books.

=== Filene's Store management policies ===
Edward Filene drew inspiration from the scientific management ideas of Frederick Winslow Taylor and adapted these ideas for use in the retail environment. While Taylor is best known for the use of scientific methods to increase workplace efficiency, he was also interested in how to improve the quality of work for employees. Filene is credited with refining a number of under-utilized and in some cases novel retailing techniques. For example, Filene's Department Store offered complete and honest descriptions of its merchandise and offered to give customers their "money back if not satisfied".

Edward Filene was a proponent of the scientific approach to retail management. In 1909, he introduced the "bargain basement" principle. Under this plan, merchandise had to be sold within 30 days or it was marked down; after a further 12 days, the merchandise was further reduced by 25% and if still unsold after another 18 days, a further markdown of 25% was applied. If the merchandise remained unsold after two months, it was given to charity. Although Filene's Basement was not the first 'bargain basement' in the U.S., the principles of 'automatic mark-downs' generated excitement and proved very profitable. Filene personally supervised construction of the first basement in Boston. An advocate of consumer education, he introduced color matching tools in the clothing departments of his stores.

Filene was a pioneer in employee relations. He instituted a profit sharing program, a minimum wage for women, a 40-hour work week, health clinics and paid vacations. He also played an important role in encouraging the Filene Cooperative Association, "perhaps the earliest American company union". Through this channel he engaged constructively with his employees in collective bargaining and arbitration processes.

=== Origins of US credit unions ===
In 1907 Filene traveled around the world, and by February reached Calcutta, India. There, he visited some rural cooperative banks that had been promoted and funded by the British colonial government. On his return, he contacted his associate Franklin D. Roosevelt and suggested that a similar type of organization be promoted by the US government in the Philippines.

He realized that credit unions could help ordinary American workers to access loans at reasonable rates. Equally important, workers could save their money so that when hard times hit, they were prepared.

Subsequent to this trip the philanthropy he practiced, combined with the steady implementation efforts of his associate Roy Bergengren were critical to the emergence of credit unions in the United States. He also donated $1 million to the Consumers Distribution Corporation to help them organize a national network of cooperative retail stores.

In 1908, Filene and Massachusetts banking commissioner Pierre Jay, helped organize public hearings on creating credit union legislation in Massachusetts. The Massachusetts Credit Union Act of 1909 was the first comprehensive credit union law in the United States, and would serve as a model for the Federal Credit Union Act of 1934.

Inspired by the experience in many European countries where credit unions were called "people's banks", Filene organized the National Association of Peoples Banks to advance the credit union cause in the US. However, little came of this until 1921, when Filene observed in Roy Bergengren the key organizer he needed. Together with Bergengren he founded the Credit Union National Extension Bureau.

In 1921, Edward A. Filene formed a savings and loan association for employees which later became the Filene Federal Credit Union of Boston, then merged with Webster First Federal Credit Union.

Filene seems to have been responsible, with the collaboration of Pierre Jay, for the adoption of the term "credit union" in the United States. His concern with fighting loan sharks and excessively costly consumer loans led to the choice of the word "credit", while his interest in working people made him want to cast unions in a more positive light.

=== Credit Union National Extension Bureau, 1921–1934 ===
In 1921, Filene founded the Extension Bureau, to which he donated nearly $1 million during its 14-year history. It had four goals: to bring about the laws needed for credit union development in the various states, subsequently, to organize some credit unions in each state that could serve as examples to others, to expand the number of credit unions to the point that they could create self-sustaining state federations, and to combine the federations into a self-sustaining national association.

Filene hired Roy Bergengren, and their collaboration and the work of the Extension Bureau proved very effective, bringing state laws to fruition in 26 states and substantially revised flawed legal frameworks in 5 others. In 1934 the Roosevelt Administration passed the Federal Credit Union Act, making it possible to form a credit union anywhere in the United States.

The Extension Bureau has been a model for many projects related to international development and microfinance since. Foreshadowing debates that still rage, Filene's and Bergengren's views diverged on two key issues:

First, Bergengren believed that the Extension Bureau should attempt to secure federal legislation first, rather than work state by state. Filene maintained that a national law should be based on a sound understanding of the diverse circumstances of people across America—from shrimp fishermen in Louisiana, to factory workers in Massachusetts or farmers in the mid-West. Only by developing many state laws first would such a sound national understanding be possible. He prevailed in this debate.

Second, as the Great Depression set in the Reconstruction Finance Corporation under President Hoover sought to stimulate the economy with soft loans targeted to banks, railways and large companies. Filene favoured asking for $100 million in reconstruction credits to be pumped into credit unions. Bergengren strongly opposed this position, and his view prevailed this time. "To him, it meant destroying the vital principle of the whole movement by converting a community enterprise into an agency of the government. To teach people how to help themselves was more important by far in times of depression than at any other time."

=== Credit Union National Association, 1934 ===
With the work of the Bureau essentially completed, a national meeting of credit union leaders was called at Estes Park, Colorado. On August 11, 1934, the Credit Union National Association, a national federation funded by the nation's credit unions, was formed to replace the Bureau. The role of philanthropy in creating the US credit union system was over. The founding by-laws of CUNA recognized Filene's contributions with the following words:

In grateful recognition of the fact that Edward A. Filene is the Friedrich Wilhelm Raiffeisen of America – that he first brought cooperative credit to the United States – that he created in 1921 and financed from 1921 to 1934 the Credit Union National Extension Bureau in order that there might be a sustained development of cooperative credit in our country – in free acknowledgement of the unique debt which we and succeeding generations of credit union members owe and will always owe him – we make a part of these our By-laws, not subject at any time to amendment, this acknowledgement – and we create the office of Founder of this Association and name Edward A. Filene to that office for life. Thereafter said office shall be abolished.

== Philanthropy ==
Filene's lifestyle and motivation for his philanthropic work was described by Bergengren, who knew him for much of his adult life.

He had a great distaste for material things, lived very modestly, never owned an automobile and was scrupulously careful about small expenditures, all because he felt that he was a trustee for the money that he had earned and that the trustee-ship involved turning his accumulations into the greatest possible disinterested public service.

Several writers mention the fact that Filene never married may be why "his family in a very real sense became society as a whole." Filene "played a pivotal role in passing America's first Workmen's Compensation Law in 1911" and was a founder of the Boston, American and international chambers of commerce.

Filene believed in the intrinsic capability of ordinary people to improve their own condition, given "good information and the discipline to use it effectively." This faith led not only to his involvement with credit unions, but to a wider interest in research into critical social and economic trends. This research, if clearly explained to the public, would advance the causes of both democracy and peace. These views led him to found the Twentieth Century Fund in 1919, since renamed The Century Foundation.

Living in the era of Henry Ford, Filene believed that the problems of mass production had essentially been solved. But he feared that production by itself would not ensure prosperity; if ordinary workers could not afford to continue financing this expansion with their purchasing power, the result would be either reduced production or worse, increased social inequality leading to violence or dictatorship. He saw credit unions as an important part of the answer.

In a speech in California in 1936 he summed up his view:

What is needed is that the American masses shall learn the art of constructive self-government in this machine age – in this age in which life is no longer organized on a small community pattern but in which all Americans are more or less dependent upon what all other Americans are doing.

An important initiative was the "Boston-1915", a multi-sector, private-public sector partnership that organized leaders and committees to take leadership roles in solving key urban problems, including slums, public health, crime and local governance.

Filene was for world peace; he joined the League to Enforce Peace founded 1915 in New York after World War I had broken out, and he supported the League of Nations after the war.

Filene corresponded with a wide range of leaders from Woodrow Wilson and Georges Clemenceau to Mahatma Gandhi and Vladimir Lenin.

== Last years and death ==
During the 1930s, Filene was concerned about the growing threat of the Axis powers on the international front, and the need to prevent another Great Depression on the home front. He was appalled by the growing strength of the Fascist movement and worried about the growing anti-Semitism in Europe. He gave many speeches on the subject and wrote against the growing anti-Semitism in the United States. To counter the influence of propaganda, Filene provided the seed money in 1937 for the Institute for Propaganda Analysis, which published a Bulletin and books to inform the public before World War II.

His other major concern was mass production. He argued that higher wages and shorter hours for workers would enable them to buy materials they could not otherwise afford. He wrote several books on the subject and proposed that mass production, mass distribution and worker purchasing power were the answer to economic depression. He admired the methods of Henry Ford in the auto industry.

In 1935, at the age of 75, he made a visit to Moscow and was stricken with pneumonia. His assistant, Lillian Schoedler was able to get him the best of care and he did recover. In 1937, however, he made another trip to Europe to attend the International Chamber of Commerce meeting in Paris. He again contracted pneumonia and died in the American Hospital of Paris in Neuilly-sur-Seine on September 26, 1937.

His death was reported on the front page of every major newspaper in the world. A man who thought of himself as a "seller of pins" would have been honored indeed by the tribute paid to him by President Franklin D. Roosevelt when he heard of Filene's death Roosevelt wrote:

It is not individual persons but the people as a whole who were closest to the heart of this unique personality. Mr. Filene was, however, more than a champion of popular rights. He was a prophet who perceived the true meaning of these changing times. He was an analyst who was able, by mathematical calculations, to make plain to us that our modern mechanism of abundance cannot be kept in operation unless the masses of our people are enabled to live abundantly. His democracy was, therefore, more than a tradition. His liberalism was more than a formula. His faith was more than a mere assent to principles which have proved to be tried and true. He did not repudiate the past, after the fashion of some reformers, nor did he repudiate the future after the fashion of those who fear reform. He believed in learning and searching out the ways of human progress.

Roy Bergengren conducted a series of memorial meetings for credit unionists around the country. The Board of Directors of Credit Union National Association and CUNA Mutual Insurance Company voted to raise funds to build a memorial to their founder. Filene House in Madison, Wisconsin was the result. President Harry S. Truman dedicated the building in May 1950.

== Legacy ==
Filene is considered the father of the U.S. credit union movement, which by the end of 2024, with 142.3 million members, had the largest membership of any country and one of the highest levels of market penetration in the world.

A credit union think tank and research organization, the Filene Research Institute, is named in his honor. A building of the Hillman Housing Corporation, a housing cooperative on the Lower East Side of Manhattan, is named after him. Bronze busts honoring Filene and seven other industry magnates stand outside between the Chicago River and the Merchandise Mart in downtown Chicago, Illinois.

The first credit union to be named after Filene outside the United States was Filene Credit Union in Broad Cove, Nova Scotia in December 1932.

In 1931, Lincoln Steffens agreed to write a biography of Filene. He asked Whittaker Chambers to help him write it; when Chambers declined, he turned to Robert Cantwell. In December 1931, Cantwell accepted–and Steffens had a heart attack. In 1936, Steffens died with the book incomplete. In 1937, Cantwell gave the manuscript to Filene–and Filene died. The book went unpublished.

In 1944, the Liberty ship SS Edward A. Filene was built for the U.S. Maritime Commission by St. Johns River Shipbuilding Company in Jacksonville, Florida. Laid down on February 9, the ship was launched on April 6 in a christening ceremony sponsored by Catherine Filene Shouse that many in Florida's credit union business attended. In 1966, the decommissioned ship was sunk at Cook Inlet, Alaska, to be used as a breakwater and dock.

== Publications ==
- 1906: The Betterment of the Conditions of Working Women, Annals of the American Academy of Political and Social Science 27: 613 to 23 via Internet Archive.
- 1915: Cooperative Pioneering and Guaranteeing in Foreign Trade, Annals of the American Academy of Political and Social Science 59: 321 to 32 via Internet Archive.
- 1917: Democratic organization of the coming peace conference, Annals of the American Academy of Political and Social Science via Internet Archive
- 1919: International Business Coöperation, Annals of the American Academy of Political and Social Science 89: 135 to 42, via Internet Archive
- 1920: The World Mix-up and the Way Out, Annals of the American Academy of Political and Social Science 92: 26–34.
- 19??: The winning plans of the European peace awards: offered in Great Britain, France, Italy, and Germany for "The best practical proposals for restoring peace and prosperity in each of those countries thru international co-operation". Rouffé, imp., 180 pages, digitized Sep 15, 2010.
- 1921: "Work Or War?", 23 pages.
- 19??: "The War's Influence Upon American Business", publisher not identified, 15 pages.
- 192?: "An American View: Prosperous Neighbors Swell the Nation's Pocketbooks", Wm. Filene's Sons Company, 4 pages.
- 1922: Is American Coöperation Necessary for European Rehabilitation, Annals of the American Academy of Political and Social Science 102: 183–9, via Internet Archive.
- 1924: The Way Out: A Forecast of Coming Changes in American Business and Industry., Doubleday, Page, 306 pages, via Internet Archive
- 1925: The Way Out. A Business Man Looks at the World, London, 248 pages.
- 1927: "The Way Out for the Manufacturer and the Merchant": An Address. published by Marlborough Chamber of Commerce, 18 pages.
- 1925: "More Profits from Merchandising: The Model Stock Plan for Distributors, Producers, and Buyers", An Address Before the Retailers Lucheon, Illinois Chamber of Commerce, at Chicago, Thursday, October 18, 1928. self-published, 11 pages.
- 1928: "The New Responsibilities of the Buyer", 14 pages.
- 1928: "Contributions of Research to Business": An Address Delivered Before the Sixty-ninth Convocation of the University of the State of New York at Albany, Friday, October 19, 1928, 14 pages.
- 1929: "Mass Production and the Tariff", 7 pages.
- 1930: The Model Stock Plan, McGraw-Hill, New York, pp 253, reissued by Literary Licensing, LLC, 270 pages, ISBN 1258637103.(March 23, 2013)
- 1931: Successful Living in This Machine Age. published by Jonathan Cape Toronto. reissued by Lewis Press 348 pages, ISBN 1406772615 via Internet Archive
- 1934: The Consumer's Dollar. New York, John Day Company 29 pages, ASIN: B00086S6P.
- 1934: "A Merchant Surveys the New Deal: Radio Address", 8 pages.
- 1934: "Department Store-manufactures's Relationships", Issue 3 of Marketing series, American Management Association, Kraus Reprint Corporation, 16 pages.
- 1934: "The New Deal and the Old Ideal", reprint, 2 pages.
- 1935: Morals in Business. published by the Committee On the Barbara Weinstock Lecture, via Internet Archive
- 1936: Cooperation, a Natural Human Law, reprinted by American Red Cross, 3 pages.
- 1936: Religion and Distribution, an Address ...(at the Dinner of the Synod of New York of the Presbyterian Church of the U.S.A., Brooklyn, New York, October 21, 1936). reprint, publisher not identified, 5 pages.
- 1937: (with Werner Karl Gabler & Percy Shiras Brown) Next Steps Forward in Retailing, Harper & Bros
- 1939: Speaking of Change: A Selection of Speeches and Articles ISBN 9781258357139 via Internet Archive

=== French language ===
- 1925: Le problème européen et sa solution Bibliothèque politique et economique, Translated by Francis Delaisi. Payot, 159 pages.
- 1934: "Servir, au siècle des machines", Volume 1 of Encyclopédia Pax ... 2. collection: Coopération sociale. 1.ser. Philosophie et pratique Volume 2 of Encyclopédie Pax. Les Éditions internationales, 291 pages.

=== German language ===
- 1927: Mehr Rentabilität im Einzelhandel: (Der Normal-Lagerplan), "L." Schottlaender & Company, 171 pages.
- 1931: Reichtum für alle: der neue Kapitalismus, Braumüller, 89 pages.

== See also ==
- America's Credit Union Museum
- History of credit unions
- History of marketing
- Institute for Propaganda Analysis
- Retail
- Monsignor Pierre Hevey, Roman Catholic Priest who was instrumental in starting a Credit Union for his parishioners
- Filene's Department store
- Alphonse Desjardins
