= Children's Theatre-in-the-Woods =

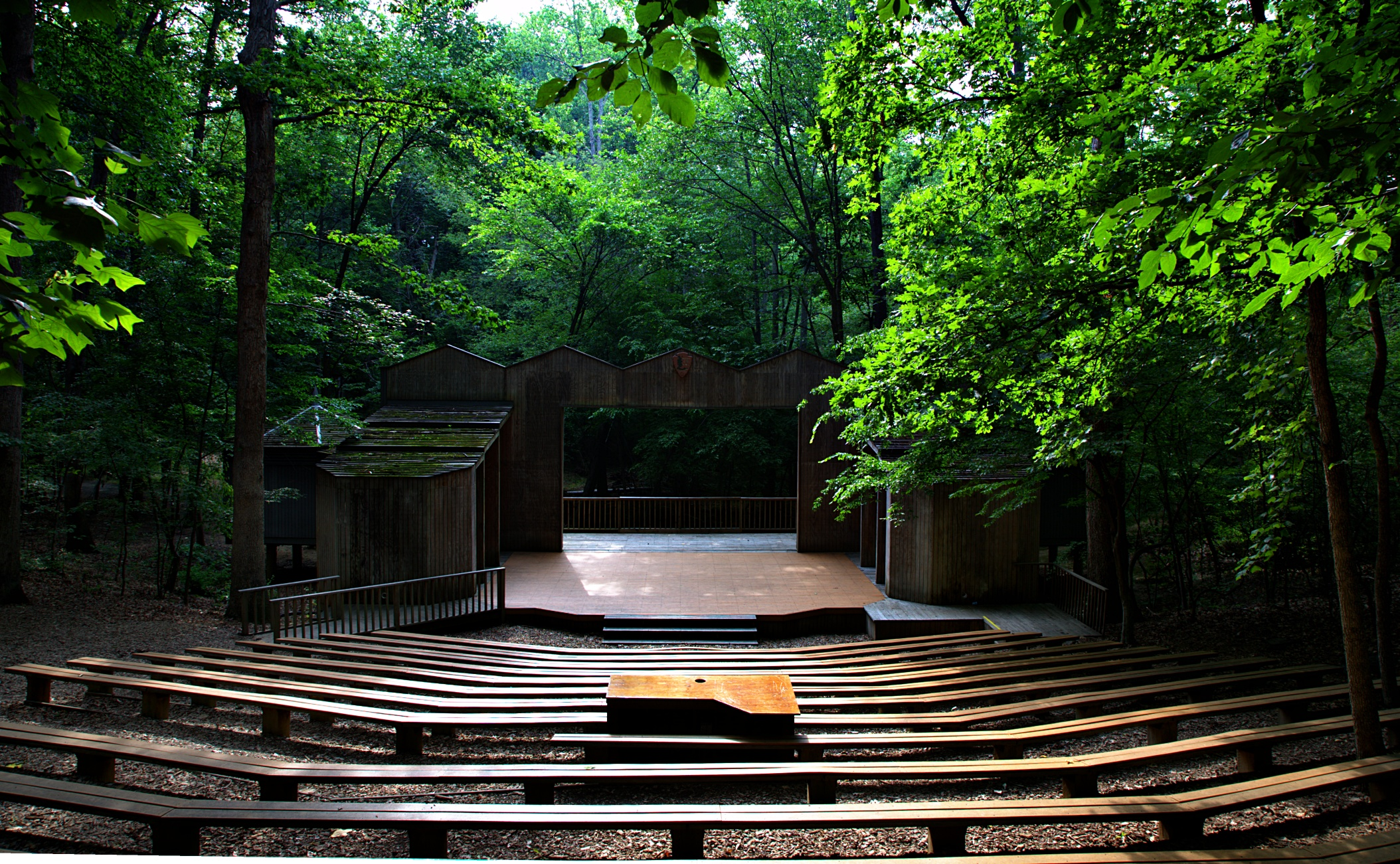
Children's Theatre-in-the-Woods

Children's Theatre-in-the-Woods (also known more simply as Theatre-in-the-Woods) is one of the main performance venues at Wolf Trap National Park for the Performing Arts in Vienna, Virginia.

Each summer, Theatre-in-the-Woods features family-friendly performances at 10:30 AM on Tuesdays through Saturdays. The stage is set amidst 117 rolling acres of wooded area in a shady grove, and features lively acts in music, dance, storytelling, puppetry, and theater, as well as creative workshops for children and their parents. All performances are recommended for children between Kindergarten and 6th grade.

== History ==
On November 18, 1976, a fire of unknown origin destroyed the Theatre-in-the-Woods. At the time, attempted arson was believed to be the cause of the fire, although this was never proven. The fire was first spotted by an employee of the American Symphony Orchestra League around 4 PM that afternoon.

In 1989, Theatre-in-the-Woods inspired a similar production at Black Hill Regional Park in nearby Boyds, Maryland. Montgomery County delegate Jean W. Roesser, who previously saw a Theatre-in-the-Woods performance, helped fund and develop a performing arts series for children called "Summer Stage in the Park for Kids," which similarly featured performances in music, storytelling and dance during weekdays in the summer.

== Theatre-in-the-Woods today ==
In 2011, Theatre-in-the-Woods was featured in "Best Summer Ever if You've Got Little Ones" by Washingtonian Magazine. The 2012 season of Theatre-in-the-Woods will feature 34 performances from "local, national, international, and Grammy-nominated artists who represent folk, kindie-rock, storytelling, theatre, world-class puppetry, and dance."
