= Jasper N. Tincher =

American politician

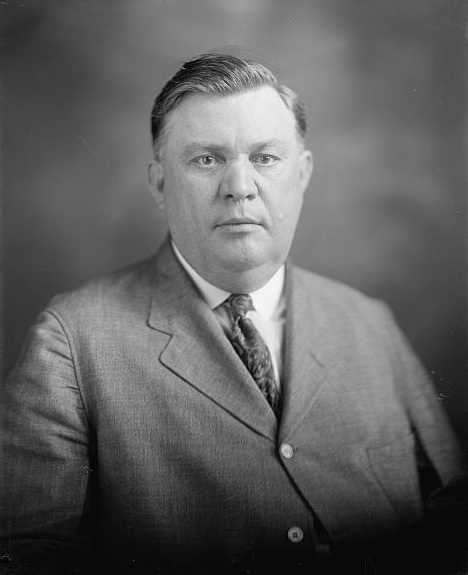

Member of the U.S. House of Representatives from Kansas's 7th district
- In office March 4, 1919 – March 3, 1927

Personal details
- Born: November 2, 1878 near Browning, Missouri, US
- Died: November 6, 1951 (aged 73) Hutchinson, Kansas, US
- Party: Republican
- Occupation: Lawyer, teacher, farmer, politician

Jasper Napoleon Tincher (November 2, 1878 – November 6, 1951) was a U.S. representative from Kansas.

Born near Browning, Missouri, Tincher moved with his parents to Medicine Lodge, Kansas, in 1892. He attended the common and high schools. He taught school in Hardtner, Kansas, from 1896 until February 1899. He worked and studied in a law office and was admitted to the bar in May 1899. He commenced the practice of law in Medicine Lodge, Kansas. He was also interested in farming and stock raising.

Tincher was elected as a Republican to the Sixty-sixth and to the three succeeding Congresses (March 4, 1919 – March 3, 1927). During the 1924 Republican National Convention, he was a supporter of Charles Curtis for Vice President.

He was not a candidate for renomination in 1926. He moved to Hutchinson, Kansas, in 1926 and practiced law until his death there on November 6, 1951. He was interred in Memorial Park Cemetery.

U.S. House of Representatives
Preceded by Jouett Shouse	Member of the U.S. House of Representatives from Kansas's 7th congressional district March 4, 1919–March 3, 1927	Succeeded by Clifford R. Hope
