= Lincoln Filene =

American businessman and philanthropist

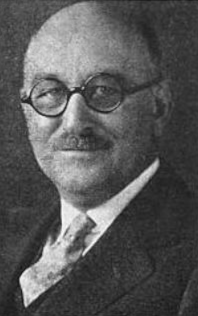
- Filene in a 1927 publication
- Born: Abraham Lincoln Filene; April 5, 1865; Boston, Massachusetts, US
- Died: August 27, 1957 (aged 92); Marstons Mills, Massachusetts, US
- Occupations: Businessman, philanthropist
- Spouse: Thérèse Weill
- Children: Helen Filene Ladd; Catherine Filene Shouse

Abraham Lincoln Filene (April 5, 1865 – August 27, 1957) was an American businessman and philanthropist.

== Biography ==
Born to a Jewish family in Boston, Massachusetts, he was one of 5 children of William Filene and Clara Ballin. His parents were German Jewish immigrants - his father from Posen, Prussia and mother was born in Segnitz, Bavaria - who immigrated to the United States in 1848. His father founded Filene's department stores.

Known by his middle name, Lincoln, together with his older brother Edward, built his father's store into a highly successful business.

A social reformer, Lincoln Filene supported the American women's suffrage movement and went against the position taken by most members of the American business community when he publicly supported President Franklin Roosevelt's New Deal agenda.

Filene had a keen interest in educational issues and served as a member of the Executive Board of the National Committee for the Department of Education. A philanthropist, in 1937 he and his wife established the Lincoln and Therese Filene Foundation. They supported numerous educational endeavours including the "Lincoln Filene Center for Citizenship and Public Affairs" at Tufts University and in 1955 funded the first educational television station in the city of Boston.

== Personal life ==
Lincoln Filene married Thérèse Weill. A family involved in the arts, they were part of the group who founded the Boston Symphony Orchestra. They had two daughters, Helen Filene Ladd and Catherine Filene Shouse. Catherine received numerous domestic and international honors for her contribution to the arts and who donated the land and provided funding for Virginia's Wolf Trap National Park for the Performing Arts. Lincoln Filene died in 1957 in Marstons Mills, Massachusetts.
