= Plaza del Sol =

Plaza del Sol may refer to:

- Plaza del Sol (Mexico), a shopping mall in Guadalajara, Jalisco, Mexico
- Plaza del Sol (Puerto Rico), a shopping mall in Bayamon, Puerto Rico
- Plaza del Sol (Florida), formerly Osceola Square Mall, a shopping mall in Kissimmee, Florida, United States
- Plaza del Sol (Barcelona), a public plaza in Barcelona, Spain
- Plaza del Sol, a shopping mall in Del Rio, Texas, United States
- Plaza del Sol (Gresham, Oregon), a landmark in Gresham, Oregon, United States
