= Terry Lundgren =

American business executive (born 1952)

- Born: Terrence James Lundgren; March 23, 1952 (age 74); Long Beach, California, United States
- Education: University of Arizona
- Occupations: Retired Chairman and CEO, Macy's, Inc.

Terrence James Lundgren (born March 23, 1952) is an American business executive who retired on January 31, 2018, as executive chairman of Macy's, Inc. the parent company of fashion retailers Macy's, Bloomingdale's, and Bluemercury. He had served for 14 years as chairman and chief executive officer of Macy's, Inc., becoming the company's executive chairman in 2017. He was named an executive in residence at Columbia Business School in 2017.

== Early life ==
Born in Long Beach, California, Lundgren was one of six children. He was the only member of the six that went to college because of his parents' limited financial capacity. His parents stopped paying for his tuition, seeing Lundgren did not have good grades. In response, Lundgren "found a job at a local restaurant in Tucson, where he was responsible for cracking oysters and peeling shrimp." He was eventually "promoted to a waiter, then the head waiter, and then the head manager of the restaurant." Through his job, he was able to graduate from the University of Arizona.

== Career ==
After graduating from the University of Arizona in 1974, he joined Federated Department Stores, Inc. (known as Macy's, Inc. since 2007) and rose quickly to lead the upscale specialty Bullocks Wilshire division in Los Angeles at age 35. He served as CEO of Neiman Marcus before returning to Federated in 1994.

Through his career at Macy's, Lundgren is credited with being an innovator in merchandising, branding and localization. He was instrumental in developing the company's private brands of merchandise and led the 2005 merger of Federated and May Department Stores Company, creating one of the largest retailers in the world, with more than 800 U.S. stores and 2008 net sales of US$24.9 billion. The May Company acquisition allowed Macy's to become a truly nationwide retailing brand for the first time.

Under Lundgren, Macy's implemented a successful "My Macy's", localization initiative in spring 2008 to tailor a portion of every store's assortment to local tastes and color. The company reported that of its top 15 best-performing geographic markets in the key holiday selling month of December 2008, 13 were My Macy's pilot districts. The My Macy's organizational model was then rolled out across the U.S. in 2009 and became a Harvard Business School case study for successful localization within a national retailing model.

Lundgren also led Macy's significant investments in ecommerce and mobile shopping, which led it to become one of the largest online retailers in America. Under Lundgren, Macy's, Inc. acquired beauty retailer Bluemercury in 2015.

Lundgren has been awarded numerous honors. In 2008, he received the Gold Medal Award from the National Retail Federation, considered the retailing industry's pre-eminent honor. In spring 2008, he was presented with Carnegie Hall's third annual Medal of Excellence for outstanding philanthropic leadership in the arts. The gala held in Lundgren's honor raised $4.2 million for Carnegie Hall.

Lundgren was named one of the Top 30 CEOs in the world by Barron's in 2015. He was Women's Wear Daily's "Newsmaker of the Year" in 2014 and is the recipient of the Deming Cup by Columbia Business School for distinction in leading continuous improvement.

Lundgren is very active in the community; he is a trustee of Carnegie Hall and served as commissioner on Women's Economic Development by appointment of the mayor of New York. Also, at the request of NYC Mayor Michael R. Bloomberg he served as one of the industry chairs of Fashion.NYC.2020, which looked at the future of NYC's fashion industry and made recommendations for actionable steps the NYC government could take to promote NYC's fashion industry

He has been presented with numerous business recognition awards and has served as dinner chairman or as honoree for numerous retail industry organizations and charities, including Carnegie Hall, MoMA, BRAG, the Fresh Air Fund, American Jewish Council, Breast Cancer Awareness, NOW Legal Defense, Parsons School, Fashion Institute of Technology and the Ovarian Cancer Society. Lundgren is a former board member of The New York City Partnership and United Way of New York City, in addition to participating in numerous other charitable and civic efforts. He served for two terms as chairman of the National Minority Supplier Development Council, and was co-chair of the American Heart Association's CEO Roundtable.

Lundgren currently serves on the board of directors of the Procter & Gamble Company and previously was a board member of Kraft Foods Inc. He formerly chaired the Economic Club of New York and served on the board of the Federal Reserve Bank of New York. He also served twice (from 2010 to 2013 and again from 2017 to 2018) as chairman of the National Retail Federation, the retail industry's primary trade association.

== Personal life ==
Lundgren was married to Nancy Cross until their divorce; he has two daughters from this marriage. Lundgren married Tina Stephan in 2005.

Lundgren is also the namesake of the Terry J. Lundgren Center for Retailing at the University of Arizona, where he is also an alumnus, having graduated in 1974 with a bachelor's degree. In 2000, Lundgren was awarded an honorary doctorate and delivered the university's commencement address.

== Professional history ==
- Federated Department Stores: Bullock's division, 1975–1987
- Bullocks Wilshire: 1987–1988, president
- Neiman Marcus: 1988–1994, EVP, then chairman/CEO
- Federated Merchandising Group: 1994–1997, chairman/CEO
- Macy's, Inc. (called Federated Department Stores, Inc. prior to June 1, 2007):

1997–2003 President and chief merchandising officer
2003–2004 President and chief executive officer
2004–2014 Chairman, president and CEO
2014–2017 Chairman and CEO
2017–2018 Executive chairman (retired January 31, 2018)
