= Plaza del Sol (Florida) =

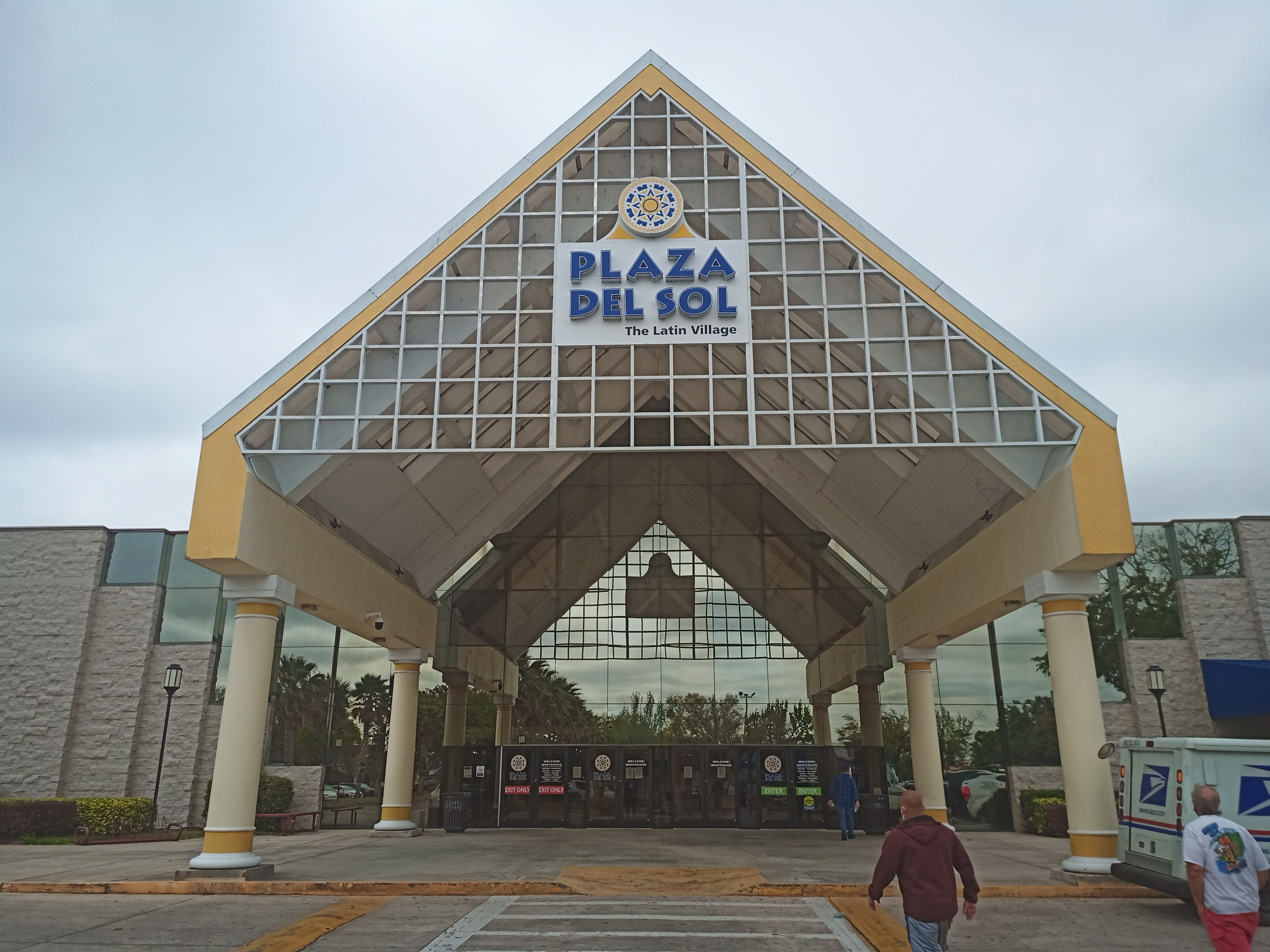
- The mall's main entrance on March 21, 2021.
- Location: Kissimmee, Florida, United States
- Coordinates: 28.30691°N 81.44258°W
- Address: 3831 West Vine Street
- Opened: 1985
- Developer: Norman Rossman
- Owner: Mauricio Vasquez
- Num. of stores: 50+
- Num. of anchor tenants: 4
- Floor area: 403,392 square feet (37,476.3 m^{2})
- Floors: 1
- Parking: Parking lot
- Public transit: 55, 56
- Website: www.plazadelsolkissimmee.com

Plaza del Sol (formerly Osceola Square Mall) is an indoor shopping mall in Kissimmee, Florida, United States. It is the only enclosed shopping center in Kissimmee, with over 50 specialty shops. Major tenants of the mall include Ollie's Bargain Outlet, Ross Dress for Less, dd's Discounts, Burlington, Planet Fitness, and Florida Technical College.

== History ==
The mall opened as Osceola Square Mall in 1985. One of its original anchor stores was a 82,000-square-foot (7,600 m^{2}) Walmart. Other major tenants upon opening included Ross Dress for Less, J. Byrons (later Uptons), Morrison's Cafeteria, and Eckerd Corporation.

In 1996, Walmart moved out of the mall in favor of a Supercenter further down U.S. Route 192. One year later the former Walmart became a Bealls department store.

In 2014, the mall received a Latino-themed makeover and was renamed to Plaza del Sol.
