= Sunshine Mall =

Demolished enclosed shopping mall in Clearwater, Florida

- Location: Clearwater, FL, US
- Coordinates: 27.9541°N 82.7896°W
- Address: 1200 Missouri Avenue
- Opened: September 26, 1968
- Closed: 1998
- Developer: Gambest Associates
- Num. of stores: 72
- Num. of anchor tenants: 2
- Floor area: 310,000 square feet (29,000 m^{2})
- Floors: 1

Sunshine Mall was a single-level, enclosed shopping mall located in Clearwater, Florida, U.S. It was anchored by Phar-Mor and Office Depot. It was owned by New Haven, Connecticut based Fusco Property Management.

== History ==
The Sunshine Mall opened on September 26, 1968, with 175,000 square feet (16,300 m^{2}) of mall space and a 135,000-square-foot (12,500 m^{2}) J. C. Penney as an anchor, which replaced a store in downtown Clearwater. The mall was the first enclosed shopping center in Pinellas County, Florida.

It was at one time the largest climate-controlled mall on Florida's west coast. It was also the first in the Southern United States to offer valet parking.

The mall also featured a Trans-Lux single screen theater, Pantry Pride, SupeRx Drugs, and McCrory's. A second anchor, J Byrons, was confirmed in 1970. The theater was "twinned" into a two-screen theater in 1977, reopening in December; the theater had expanded to 5 screens by the time of closing. Pantry Pride closed at the mall in February 1979, and was replaced by Mr C's Warehouse Grocery by late 1979.

Office Depot opened in the former Sports Unlimited space in 1990. J Byrons closed at the mall in 1991, to be replaced by Phar-Mor, which was relocating from a nearby plaza. By July 1994, McCrory's had closed its doors and J. C. Penney had announced intentions to leave by January, and the mall had stopped signing new leases for interior tenants, keeping existing tenants on month-to-month leases. A US$10 million rebuild of the mall was announced in 1995, which was to transform the mall into a strip mall power center, retaining an interior corridor, however this never came to pass. The mall was demolished beginning in July 1998 by Terra Excavating Inc of Largo, FL in order to make way for a 600-apartment complex.
