= Marla Malcolm Beck =

American entrepreneur (born 1970)

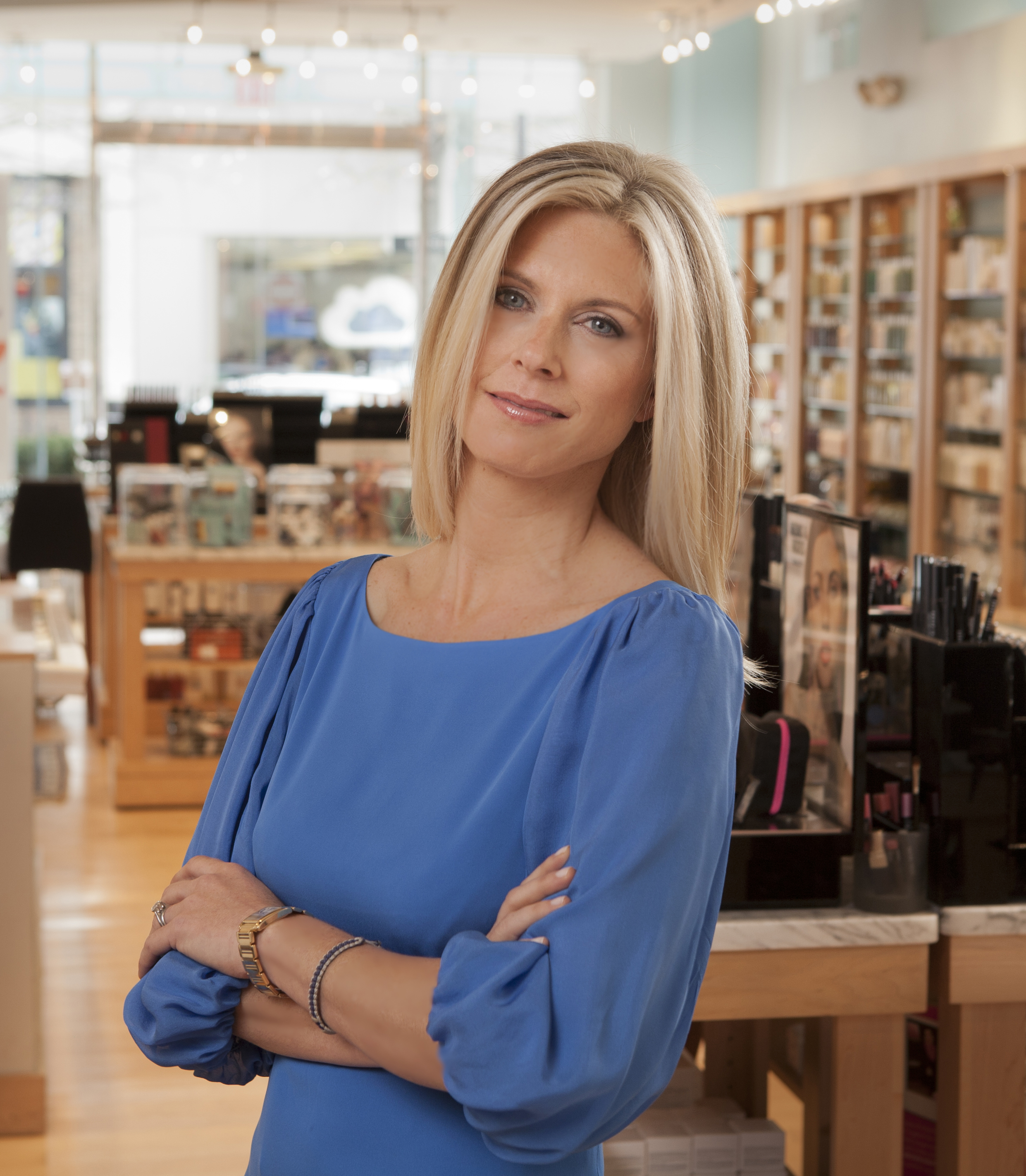
- Born: May 22, 1970 (age 56); Oakland, California, U.S.
- Education: University of California Berkeley (BA); Harvard University (MPP, MBA)
- Occupation: Entrepreneur
- Known for: Co-Founder, CEO Bluemercury
- Spouse: Barry Beck

Marla Malcolm Beck (born May 22, 1970) is an American entrepreneur based in the United States. She co-founded the beauty company Bluemercury in Washington, D.C. alongside her husband, Barry J. Beck in 1999. Bluemercury was acquired by Macy's in 2015. Beck retained her position as CEO until 2021.

== Early life and education ==
Beck is the daughter of a real estate developer. In 1993, she graduated from the University of California, Berkeley, with a Bachelor of Arts in political economy and later was hired by the global management consulting firm McKinsey & Company as an analyst.

Several years later, she quit her job to get a joint graduate degree at Harvard University, earning both her Master of Business Administration and Master of Public Administration from the Harvard Business School and Harvard Kennedy School, respectively, in 1998. After briefly entering the field of private equity, Beck exited the field to create Bluemercury with her husband.

== Career ==
In 1999, Beck and her husband founded Bluemercury as an online-only cosmetics boutique, and in the fall of that same year, the duo opened their first store in Georgetown (Washington, D.C.). By 2006, the company had grown to 12 stores across the country, supported by New York private equity firm, Invus Group LLC.

In March 2015, Bluemercury joined Macy's, Inc. through acquisition for $210 million. Beck remained Chief executive officer. At the time of the sale, Bluemercury had a little over 60 stores. In September 2019, Bluemercury Chief operating officer Barry Beck announced he would be leaving, while Marla Beck would stay on during a transition period until a new CEO was named. During the COVID-19 pandemic, Beck remained in her position at Bluemercury and moved the company towards skincare. Beck left the company in 2021.

=== M-61 Labs ===
In 2006, Beck began Bluemercury's own vegan skincare line, M-61, which launched in 2012 and refuses to use more than 100 chemicals common to the industry.

=== Lune+Aster ===
In 2015, Beck launched her own makeup line similar to M-61 in the brands commitment to vegan, gluten free, and paraben free formulas.

=== Appointed Positions ===
Beck currently serves in the following positions: The Children's Place Independent Director, Advisory Board of Harvard Business School Rock Center for Entrepreneurship, Leadership Council of Harvard Kennedy School Center for Public Leadership, Board of Trustees, Sidwell Friends School, Director Nominee Chobani, Board of Directors for Evenly Technologies, Board of Directors Beauty Health. She previously served as a Board Member for the National Retail Federation and as a member of the Global Leadership Board for EdX.

== Awards and honors ==
- 2014 - Appointed Entrepreneur in Residence at the Harvard Business School
- 2014 - Goldman Sachs' 100 Most Intriguing Entrepreneurs
- 2015 - Ernst and Young Entrepreneur of the Year National Finalist
- 2016 - Cosmetic Executive Women Achiever Award Recipient
- 2017 - BeautyCares Dream Ball Honoree alongside husband Barry Beck
- 2019 - Inducted into the Washington Business Hall of Fame
- 2019 - Harvard Business School Alumni Achievement Award

== Personal life ==
Beck resides in Bethesda, Maryland with her husband and their three children, Ariel, Sophie, and Luc.
