= Richway =

American discount department store chain

Richway Department Stores
- Type: Department store
- Industry: Retail
- Founded: 1969
- Defunct: 1988
- Fate: Reopened as Target stores
- Headquarters: Atlanta, Georgia
- Products: Clothing, footwear, bedding, furniture, jewelry, beauty products, electronics and housewares.

Richway was the discount department store division of Atlanta-based Rich's. It was originally part of Rich's, and was later bought by Federated Department Stores when they purchased the Rich's chain. It was originally known as Richway, a Rich's Company with a more bluish logo than the later orange and black theme under Federated ownership. The sunrise logo means "Everything Under The Sun", the slogan used in advertisements from that period. The official name of the chain was later Richway Department Stores. A long tagline on commercials was "We don't look like a discount store, but our price tags give us away."

== History ==
=== Beginning ===
As part of Rich's $40 million five-year expansion plan announced earlier in the year, the creation of a new discount department store division named ARCO (an initialism of “A Rich's Company”) was announced on May 28, 1969. ARCO was to open three stores in metro Atlanta in January 1970: two in Atlanta and one in Marietta. On July 30, 1969, it was announced that the ARCO division had been renamed to Richway so as to not infringe on the Atlantic Richfield Company's ARCO trademark, registered just three years prior.

Richway's first stores opened on March 4, 1970 in metro Atlanta with subsequent suburban locations in Smyrna, Sandy Springs, Tucker and College Park. A location in Forest Park opened soon thereafter. These original locations were known for their distinctive raised-wedge skylights that are still found today, yet these were boarded/covered up and hidden by drop ceilings in most subsequent building uses. Richway stores were unusually large for their time, and ahead of their time with larger selections of merchandise than most discounters offered, but with a similar, more upscale line like Target.

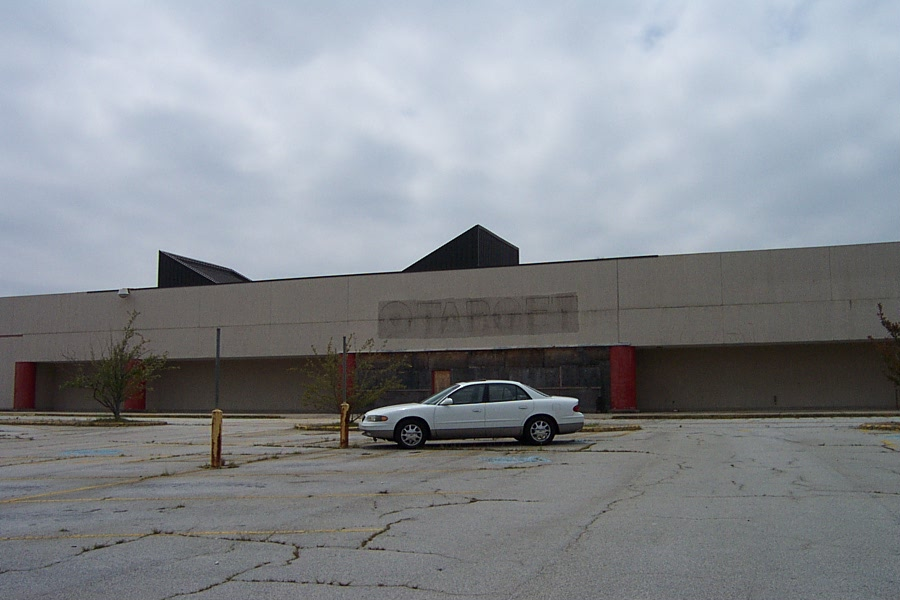
The former Richway in College Park, Georgia. It was converted to a Target in 1989 and closed in early 1998.

=== 1970s and 1980s ===
Throughout the 1970s and into the 1980s, the chain spread across the Southeast U.S., with known locations in Georgia, North Carolina (Charlotte/Gastonia), South Carolina (three locations in Columbia), Florida (where it was added as a discount division of Burdines), and two locations in Chattanooga, Tennessee. The three locations in Columbia were part of three malls that opened on the same day in 1977 known as Decker Mall, Woodhill Mall, and Bush River Mall. Of these three malls, Decker Mall is now home to only an ExtraSpace storage facility in the old Richway/Gold Circle/Target building, Woodhill Mall was redeveloped as "The Shops at Woodhill", and the site of Bush River Mall, demolished in 2006 after being closed for seven years, became home to a Walmart Supercenter and strip mall in 2007. The Walmart closed in early 2021 due to declining profitability. Richway also anchored the now-redeveloped Roswell Mall in Roswell north of Atlanta, which opened in 1974, another store with the retro skylights (now removed). This former location now houses a Floor&Decor.

The distinctive sunrise logo in its final and well-known form was designed by Robert Graham Sanderson, an art director for the chain in Atlanta. Mr. Sanderson also commissioned the famous "Black Santa" Richway catalogue cover painting. The Santa that the painting used for the cover artwork depicted had such a dark tan that some locals complained that Santa looked Black, claiming that it is well known that Santa is Caucasian of German descent.

=== Gold Circle and Target ===
In 1986, Federated Department Stores merged Richway with their discount division, Gold Circle, but retained the Richway name in some markets. Federated by then was in financial trouble and as a means to boost the company's profits, sold all Richway and Gold Circle stores to Kimco which in turn sold 31 of those stores to Dayton–Hudson Corporation (now Target Corporation) in 1988. The stores were closed, remodeled, and reopened in May 1989 as Target stores; they continued to operate as such until Target began to replace the older stores in the mid-1990s.

The 1991 movie Career Opportunities was filmed at a Richway location converted into a Target store located at 4000 Covington Hwy. in Decatur, GA (location T378). That store closed in 1999, and moved five exits north on I-285 to La Vista Road. This former location now houses a church.

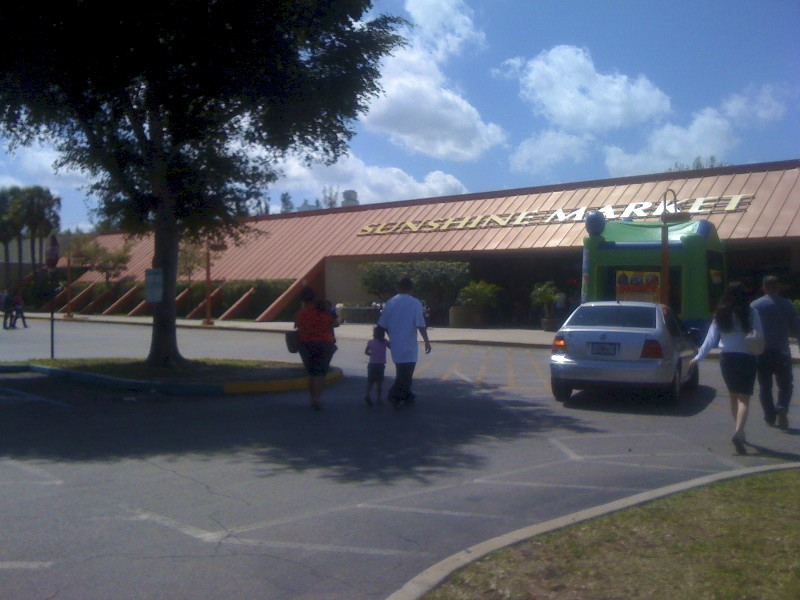
Sunshine Market occupies a former Richway in West Palm Beach, FL.

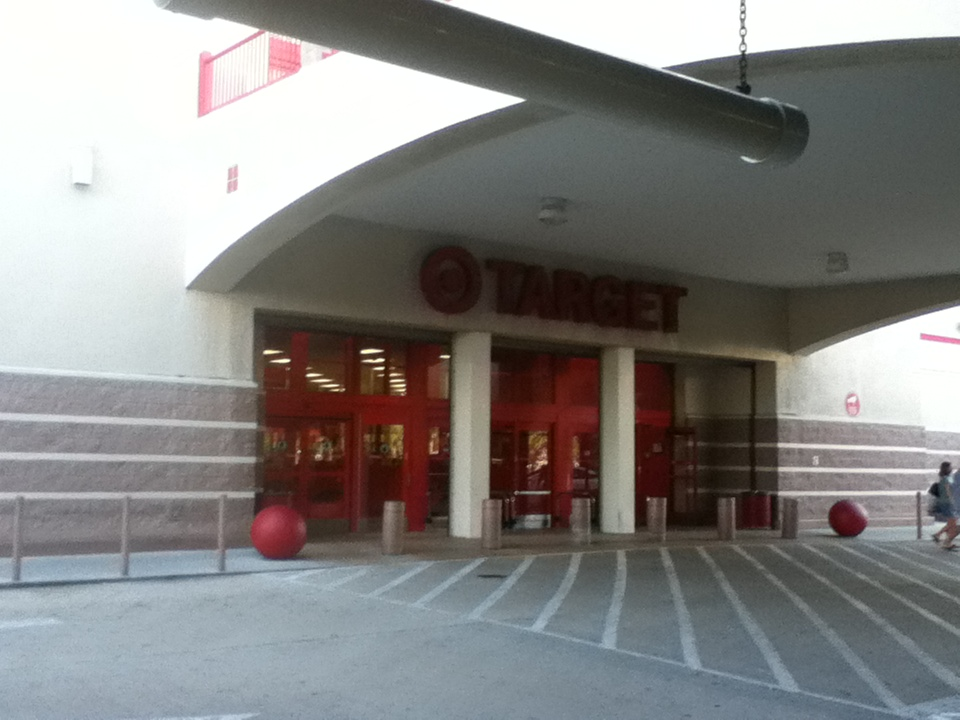
Target located in Deerfield Beach Florida which was also a Richway rebuilt in the early 2000s.

The 2000 movie Road Trip used the front of the location at 2400 North Druid Hills Rd in Atlanta, GA (T377) before it was rebuilt in 2002.

=== Today ===
Today, most of the former Richway stores either sit abandoned or have been converted to other uses. In Georgia, three former Richway locations in Jonesboro, Riverdale, and Roswell became Value City locations after Target left for newly built stores, with all but Jonesboro (and a non-Richway/Target in Doraville) closed again since early 2008. The Richway in Forest Park is now the Scott Antique Market, still with the open wedge skylights and much of the original prototype. The Richway in north Marietta is today an office for Wellstar (which owns nearby Kennestone Hospital), since the Target moved a few miles northeast on Sandy Plains Road, not long after the Town Center at Cobb store opened in 1995. The Richway in College Park was converted to a Target in 1989, and closed in early 1998 after store #0778 in nearby Fayetteville opened. As of 2022, the building has been demolished and a new redevelopment is planned for the property. The store northeast of Austell closed in 1999 and moved further southwest on Austell Road at the East-West Connector, after that road opened in the late 1990s. It was vacant until 2022, but is now a Metro Storage.. The former Richway/Target store on Johnson Ferry Road in Sandy Springs, GA was purchased in 2009 by the newly formed City of Sandy Springs and the entire block has been torn down and redeveloped as 'City Springs,' the City Hall of Sandy Springs and accompanying mixed-use development. The former store in Decatur, GA at 4000 Covington Highway was converted to a non-denominational church, Total Grace Christian Center and now is a Baptist church with various outreach ministries, Peace Baptist Church.

The Target store on North Druid Hills in Briarcliff Heights, rebuilt in 2002, remains operational. The Smyrna Target store on Cobb Parkway south of Windy Hill Road is also still operating. The building was renovated for the second time in 2005 after an earlier renovation in the 1990s. It is the only Target still open in a former Richway building; it still retains the old Richway skylight triangles on the roof, with the left (north) part still bearing the CompUSA sign since its closure in mid-2007. The Sandy Springs store closed in early October 2008 for a new one farther south on Roswell Road, and has been demolished.

Other Richways are sitting vacant where the surrounding area has fallen into decline and no reinvestment was made in the former buildings. The two Richways in Chattanooga (one at Northgate Mall and the other at Lee Highway) were converted into office/retail space while the Lee Highway store (which was also used for a flea market) has been demolished and became part of the Chattanooga Metropolitan Airport.

Several of the former stores located in the Charlotte area are still in use. Two stores on Charlotte's north side, at North Park Mall and Freedom Mall, have since been consolidated into a larger store in the University City area. The former North Park Mall location has sat abandoned for more than a decade, while the Freedom Mall location was demolished as part of the mall's conversion into government offices. Mecklenburg County purchased Freedom Mall and its surrounding 36 acres in 2003 for $6.6 million.. The former Independence Boulevard location was demolished after the Target store relocated to Matthews. The site was rebuilt as a BJ's Wholesale Club but is vacant as of 2013; another on Tyvola Road was torn down after the Target store relocated to Carolina Pavilion. The site is now a Costco. The Gastonia location was used as a Target until 2011, when Target relocated to a newly built store nearby.

In addition to the above-mentioned, two former Richway locations in Palm Beach County, Florida were also purchased and turned into Target stores. The Palm Beach Lakes Blvd. location was completely demolished (t-391) and a Super Target now sits on that land. The location in Plantation, Florida was converted over to a Target store and had the façade updated in 2005 to reflect Target's changes in marketing approach, and to also expand the parking lot to include a parking garage. The Richway store in Conyers, GA became a Target store and stayed in the former Richway location until October 2006 when it moved to a bigger location on GA20 south. The property was subdivided and part of it is now an LA Fitness center, with about 1/3 of the original lot still present.

The Richway store in Tamarac, Florida became a Target in 1989, but relocated in 2000. This store operated as a furniture store called Furniture Power. As of 2012, this building was converted to a charter school.
