= Macy's, Inc. =

American department store holding company

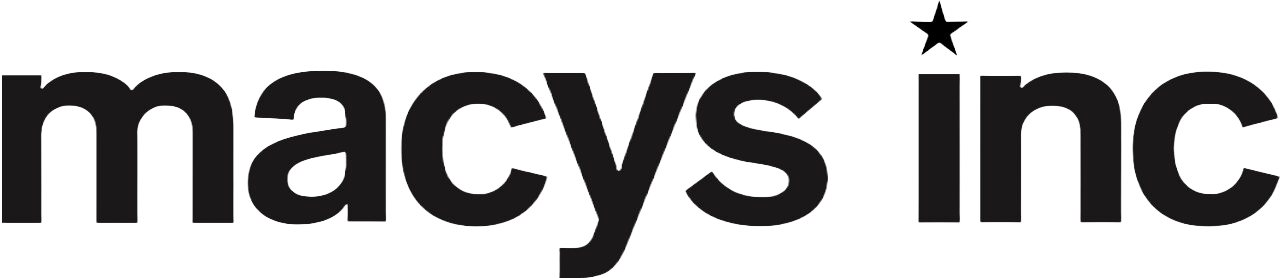

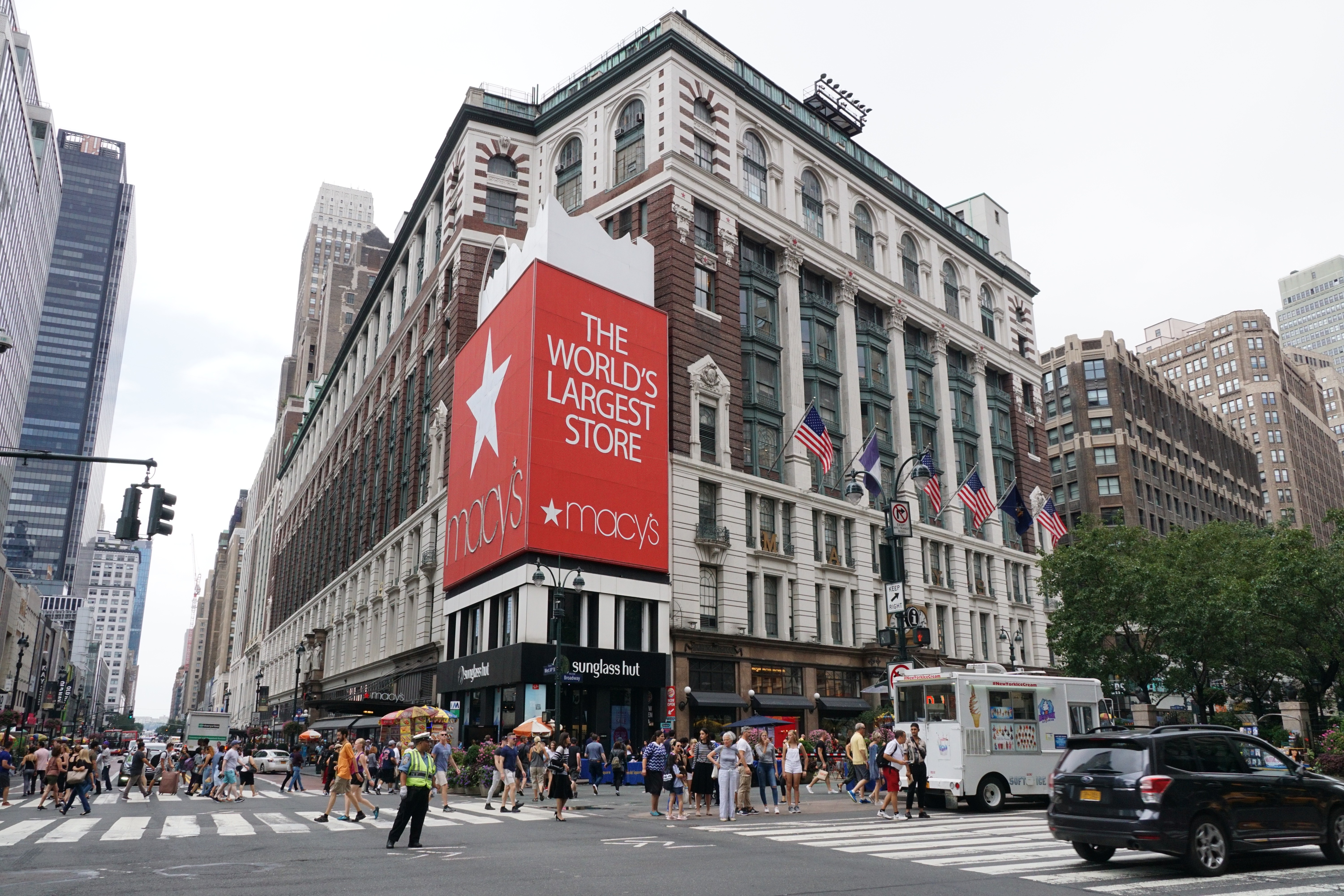
- Macy's, Inc. headquarters, located on Macy's Herald Square (2018)
- Formerly: Federated Department Stores, Inc. (1929–2007)
- Type: Public
- Traded as: NYSE: M; S&P 400 component
- Industry: Retail
- Predecessor: Filene's; Lazarus; Abraham & Straus; Bloomingdale's
- Founded: 1929; 97 years ago in Columbus, Ohio, U.S.
- Headquarters: New York City, U.S.
- Number of locations: 722 (2022)
- Area served: United States; Guam; Puerto Rico
- Key people: Tony Spring (chairman and CEO)
- Products: Clothing; footwear; accessories; bedding; furniture; jewelry; beauty products; housewares
- Revenue: ▲US$24.971 billion (FY 2019)
- Operating income: ▼US$1.738 billion (FY 2019)
- Net income: ▼US$1.098 billion (FY 2019)
- Total assets: ▼US$19.194 billion (FY 2019)
- Total equity: ▲US$6.436 billion (FY 2019)
- Number of employees: ~130,000 (2019)
- Parent: Campeau Corporation (1988–1992)
- Subsidiaries: Bloomingdale's; Bluemercury; Macy's
- Website: macysinc.com

Macy's, Inc. (previously Federated Department Stores, Inc.) is an American holding company of department stores. Upon its establishment in 1929, Federated held ownership of the regional department store chains Abraham & Straus, Lazarus, Filene's, and Shillito's. Bloomingdale's joined Federated Department Stores the next year. Throughout its early history, frequent acquisitions and divestitures saw the company operate a number of nameplates. In 1994, Federated took over Macy's, the old department store chain originally founded in 1858 by American entrepreneur Rowland Hussey Macy.

Despite Federated's long history of preserving regional department store chains, its acquisition of the May Department Stores Company in 2005 marked the end of those nameplates. By the following year, both the Macy's and Bloomingdale's brands had replaced them nationwide. Ultimately, Federated itself was renamed Macy's, Inc. in 2007; the company bought Bluemercury in 2015 from Berry J. Beck and Marla Malcolm Beck, allowing the company to expand into beauty stores.

Macy's, Inc. owns the department store chains Bloomingdale's and Macy's, and beauty store chain Bluemercury, all of which operate flagship stores in Manhattan. As of October 2022, it operates 722 locations in the United States, Guam, and Puerto Rico. The company was the world's largest fashion goods retailer and the 36th-largest retailer overall in 2010. Macy's, Inc. has been headquartered within Macy's Herald Square in New York City since 2020, and was previously headquartered in Cincinnati, Ohio, from 1945 until 2020.

== Operations as Federated ==
=== Early history ===
Federated Department Stores traces its corporate lineage to F&R Lazarus & Company, founded in Columbus, Ohio, in 1851. In the summer of 1929, months before the Wall Street Crash of 1929, Fred Lazarus Jr. met with Walter N. Rothschild from Abraham & Straus of Brooklyn and Edward Filene from Filene's of Boston on Rothschild's yacht in Long Island Sound. The three businessmen agreed to merge their stores and form Federated Department Stores, as a department store holding company for F&R Lazarus & Company (including its Cincinnati division, then known as Shillito's), Abraham & Straus, and William Filene's Sons of Boston. In 1930, Bloomingdale Brothers of New York joined.

In the mid-1930s, a modern merchandising standard was set when Fred Lazarus Jr. arranged garments in groups of a single size with a range of style, color and price, basing the technique upon observations made in Paris. As well, Lazarus convinced President Franklin D. Roosevelt that it would help American economy to change the Thanksgiving holiday from the last Thursday of November to the fourth Thursday, thus extending the Christmas shopping season. An act of Congress perpetuated the arrangement in 1941. Black Friday became a nationwide sensation and the most profitable day for Federated. (Robert Lazarus Jr. worked at Federated until he died in 2013, the last remaining family member with an official role at the company.)

In 1945, Federated moved its corporate offices to Cincinnati. The latter half of the 20th century saw the company expand nationwide, adding Rike Kumler of Dayton, Ohio (merged into Shillito's in the 1980s to become Shillito-Rike's); Burdines of Miami, Florida; Rich's of Atlanta, Georgia; Foley's of Houston, Texas; Sanger Brothers and A. Harris, both of Dallas, Texas (which were merged to form Sanger-Harris); Boston Store of Milwaukee, Wisconsin; MainStreet of Chicago, Illinois; Bullock's, of Los Angeles; I. Magnin, of San Francisco, California; Gold Circle; and Richway Discount Department Stores of Worthington, Ohio. Federated entered the supermarket industry in 1968 when it acquired the Ralphs chain based in Southern California. In 1982, Federated acquired the Twin Fair, Inc. discount store chain based in Buffalo, New York, and merged it with Gold Circle. In 1983, Federated sold four shopping center properties to JMB Realty.

=== Acquisition by Campeau ===
Canadian real estate developer Robert Campeau – who had taken over and dismembered Allied Stores in 1986 – attempted to take over Federated starting in early 1988 which Federated fought off in a high-profile battle, with Macy's (at that time not part of Federated, but a rival), also submitting competitive bids of over $6 billion. Nonetheless, in April 1988, Federated gave in and agreed to a $6.6 billion takeover by Campeau. It was the largest merger in corporate history, barring the oil sector. Macy's paid Campeau $1.1 billion to acquire the 20-store Bullock's/Bullocks Wilshire and the 25-store specialty apparel chain I. Magnin. Two years later, Federated filed for bankruptcy after Campeau failed to refinance the debt of Federated and Allied Stores Corp. In 1992, Campeau was ousted and Federated emerged from bankruptcy as a new public company, Federated Stores, Inc., dropping the word "Department" from the previous company. As part of the reorganization, Federated sold the Ralphs chain to a group of owners led by Edward J. DeBartolo Corporation.

=== Acquisition of Macy's ===
Also in 1992, Macy's declared bankruptcy; Federated acquired it two years later, in 1994. The name of the once-main-rival of Federated, Macy's, would soon become the consumer-facing identity of most of Federated's stores.

In 1995 Federated bought Broadway Stores, Inc. and its California-based Emporium-Capwell, Weinstock's and The Broadway chains. Macy's changed the nameplate of these three chains and Bullock's to Macy's, or in some cases, turned locations into Bloomingdales. In 2003, Federated changed the nameplates of almost all their remaining non-Macy's stores – the lone exception was Bloomingdales – to include the Macy's name, a rebranding internally dubbed Project Hyphen. For example, Seattle-based The Bon Marché became Bon-Macy's; Goldsmith's in Tennessee became Goldsmith's-Macy's; Lazarus, Burdines, and Rich's also added "-Macy's" to their name. A year later, the hyphenated names were changed to simply Macy's, a rebranding process referred internally to as Project Star.

Federated began selling goods online in 1998, rather later than most contemporary large retailers; Federated ran a private bank, FDS Bank, which issued and maintained the majority of its own consumer credit card portfolio, was one of the last credit card banks to begin to allow its cardholders to access account information online (around 2004).

In 1998, Federated settled an SEC investigation for $14.46 million (equivalent to $28.6 million in 2025) due to unethical debt-collection practices. Federated routinely forced credit card holders/debtors to sign an agreement that legally bound them to repay their outstanding balances instead of having the unsecured debt discharge via the filing of bankruptcy. Federated failed to file reaffirmation agreements with bankruptcy courts. As a result, the changes in the agreements were not legally binding.

In 2001 Federated acquired Liberty House of Hawaii as it emerged from Chapter 11 bankruptcy. It was managed as part of Macy's West and all the store names were changed to Macy's. The department store chain Stern's, a division of Federated, ceased operations in 2001 and most of its stores became Macy's stores.

In 2005, Federated agreed to sell its credit card business to Citigroup.

=== Acquisition of May ===
On February 28, 2005, Federated Department Stores announced that it would acquire May Department Stores company for $11 billion (equivalent to $18.1 billion in 2025). Also part of the buyout was the bridal and formal unit of May, consisting of David's Bridal and After Hours Formalwear. Federated would also assume $6 billion (equivalent to $9.89 billion in 2025) of May's debt, bringing total consideration to $17 billion (equivalent to $28 billion in 2025). The deal would create the nation's largest department store chain with over 1,000 stores and $30 billion (equivalent to $49.5 billion in 2025) in annual sales. To help finance the deal, Federated agreed to sell its combined proprietary credit card business (but still administered by FACS Group, a subsidiary of Federated) to Citigroup. The merger was completed on August 30, 2005, after an assurance agreement was reached with the Attorneys General of New York, California, Massachusetts, Maryland, and Pennsylvania.

As a result of the merger, Federated also in the process reacquired two of their former department store chains Foley's & Filene's (Which Federated originally sold to May Company), putting them back under the Federated Department Stores corporate umbrella for the first time since 1988.

Federated announced plans to sell 80 store locations in 2006, having pledged in its settlement to sell most of them as viable businesses, with preference being given to a group of thirteen competitors. This number could fluctuate pursuant to Federated's negotiations with various mall landlords and its final decision regarding using former Macy locations for its luxury Bloomingdale's operation.

On January 12, 2006, Federated announced its plans to divest May Company's Lord & Taylor division (55 stores in 12 states) by the end of 2006. On June 22, 2006, Macy's announced that NRDC Equity Partners, LLC would purchase Lord & Taylor for US$1.2 billion (equivalent to $1.92 billion in 2025), and completed the sale in October 2006.

On September 9, 2006, the former May Company store names Famous-Barr, Filene's, Foley's, Hecht's, The Jones Store, Kaufmann's, L. S. Ayres, Marshall Field's, Meier & Frank, Robinsons-May, and Strawbridge's disappeared as Federated switched most of them to the Macy's masthead and a few to the Bloomingdale's name. One of the consequences of this rebranding is that several malls have two Macy's stores. In downtown Boston, Federated liquidated an acquired Filene's because it already had a Macy's (formerly a Jordan Marsh) across the street. The two stores have a combined floorspace of more than 1,400,000 square feet (130,000 m^{2}), more than two-thirds the size of Macy's New York City flagship store.

On November 17, 2006, the bridal and formal unit was sold. David's Bridal and Priscilla of Boston were sold to Leonard Green & Partners. After Hours Formalwear was sold to Men's Wearhouse.

== Operations as Macy's, Inc. ==
=== 2000s ===
On February 27, 2007, Federated announced that its board of directors would ask shareholders to change the company's name to Macy's Group, Inc. By March 28, the company revised its plans for the new name, opting to eventually become Macy's, Inc. Federated shareholders approved the revised proposal during the company's annual meeting on May 18, 2007.

The name took effect on June 1, 2007. The reasoning for the proposed name change—according to Terry Lundgren, Federated's chairman, president, and chief executive officer—hinges on the large-scale conversions throughout the company toward the Macy's nameplate. "Today, we are a brand-driven company focused on Macy's and Bloomingdale's, not a federation of department stores," Lundgren said in the company's press release heralding the proposed name. Upon the change to Macy's Inc., Federated's stock ticker symbol on the New York Stock Exchange changed from "FD" to "M", making the new Macy's Inc. one of a handful of single-letter ticker symbol companies.

In April 2008, Moody's Investors Service said that it might downgrade Macy's Inc. bonds to just above junk status. That same month, Fitch Ratings downgraded their bond credit rating to BBB− from BBB, noting a deterioration in the company's operating and credit metrics.

The domain macysinc.com attracted at least 3 million visitors annually by 2008, according to a Compete.com survey.

On Wednesday, February 6, 2008, Terry Lundgren announced the localization strategy and the company's plan to shed 2,550 jobs. This new localization strategy is known as "My Macy's".

Employees of the Macy's North headquarters office in Minneapolis, the Macy's Northwest headquarters office in Seattle, and the Macy's Midwest headquarters office in St. Louis were given pink slips, as Macy's pared its seven regional centers to four. About 40 new jobs were to be created in May as part of the restructuring. By 2009, the company expected to save $100 million (equivalent to $150 million in 2025) a year from the cuts.

On February 2, 2009, Macy's announced the elimination of 7,000 jobs, or 4% of its workforce, and slashed its dividend as it looked to lower expenses as part of a major restructuring. Cincinnati-based Macy's Inc. stated that the workforce reduction included positions in offices, stores, and other locations, and the cuts include some unfilled jobs. "Reducing our workforce is an unfortunate outcome of the current economic environment, and I am frustrated that so many of our people will be unable to move forward with us as we proceed into a very exciting future for Macy's and Bloomingdale's" said Terry J. Lundgren, chairman, president and chief executive officer.

Macy's also got rid of its division structure and integrated its functions into one organization. Macy's central buying, merchandise planning, stores senior management and marketing functions merged to its New York City corporate office (formerly Macy's East). Corporate-related business functions, such as finance and human resources, will be primarily in Cincinnati. To buy with local consumers in mind, Macy's developed a concept called "My Macy's", in which the buyers and planners all look at what the local consumer base is looking for in their local Macy's store. This will help bring a better sense of branding, sizing, and marketing to each Macy's store nationwide.

Macy's Inc. decided to close the Bloomingdale's at the Mall of America in Minnesota. Since 1992, Bloomingdale's had been one of the 4 anchor stores of the mall, and will be replaced with a $30 million renovation with four new foreign clothing stores.

=== 2010s ===
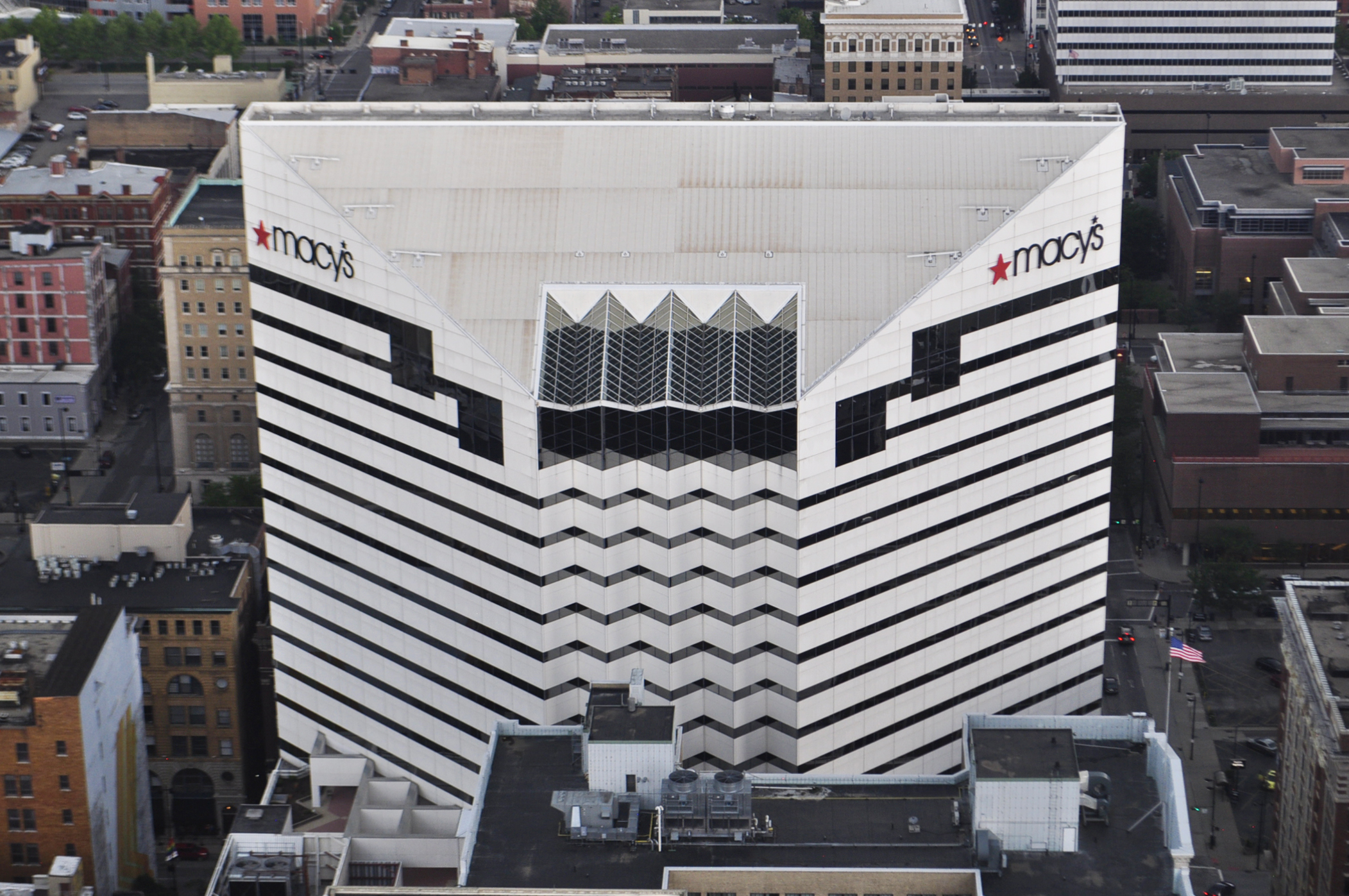
The Macy's Building, former headquarters of Macy's, Inc. in Downtown Cincinnati (2018)

On October 14, 2013, Macy's Inc. announced the decision to open most of their stores for the first time on Thanksgiving Day 2013, breaking a long-standing tradition of 155 years, and joined the ranks of retailers who created Gray Thursday the year before. Its doors opened at 8 p.m. (local time) on the holiday evening, and remained open for 24 hours straight until the close of business on Friday, which is usually about 10 p.m.

As of February 2014, Macy's Inc. was valued at US$28 billion.

In September 2015, Macy's announced it would close 40 stores, 5% of its total stores in early 2016. It also announced plans to open 6 additional Macy's Backstage locations. From 2010 to 2015, Macy's had closed 52 stores and opened 12.

=== 2020s ===
In February 2020, Macy's announced that its headquarters in downtown Cincinnati would be closing as part of a restructuring with further cutbacks. This news came after a gradual pulling out of the Cincinnati area, with most corporate executives, including the CEO, already at the company's other headquarters in New York City. The Cincinnati headquarters building has since been converted to a rental apartment building with 341 units, which has been open since spring 2025.

In November 2021, Macy's announced the launch of its digital marketplace, which set to debut in the second half of 2022. Macy's will partner with AlixPartners and Mirakl.

In November 2023, it was reported that Arkhouse Management and Brigade Capital Management had offered to buy Macy's Inc. for $5.8 billion. Macy's rejected the unsolicited offer in January 2024 as undervalued. The investor group increased their offer to $6.6 billion two months later.

In February 2024, Macy's announced it would close 150 stores by 2026.

== Nameplates ==
List of department stores owned by Macy's, Inc.
Name	Year founded	Year acquired	Notes
Bloomie's	2021	—N/a	Small-format Bloomingdale's
Bloomingdale's	1861	1930	
Bloomingdale's The Outlet Store	2010	—N/a	
Bluemercury	1999	2015	
Macy's	1858	1994	
Macy's Backstage	2015	—N/a	
Market by Macy's	2020	—N/a	Small-format Macy's

== Previous nameplates ==
List of department stores previously owned by Macy's Co. and Federated
Name	Year founded	Year acquired	Year defunct	Notes
A. Harris and Company	1889	1961	1961	Merged with Sanger Brothers to form Sanger-Harris
Abraham & Straus	1865	1929	1995	Converted to Macy's and Stern's
After Hours	1946	2005	2008	Sold to Men's Wearhouse in 2006
Bamberger's	1893	1929	1986	Converted to Macy's
The Bon Marché	1890	1992	2005	Co-branded Bon-Macy's from 2003–2005; converted to Bloomingdale's and Macy's
Boston Store	1897	1948	1985	Sold to Maus Frères
The Broadway	1896	1995	1996	Majority of the stores were converted to Macy's and Bloomingdale's. Rest of the stores were sold to and converted into Sears.
Bullock's	1907	1995	1996	Previously owned by Federated from 1948–1985; converted to Macy's
Burdines	1896	1956	2005	Co-branded Burdines-Macy's from 2003–2005; converted to Macy's
David's Bridal	1950	2005	—N/a	Sold to Leonard Green & Partners in 2006
Davison's	1891	1925	1985	Converted to Macy's
The Emporium	1896	1995	1996	Converted to Macy's
Famous-Barr	1911	2005	2006	Converted to Macy's
Filene's	1881	2005	2006	Previously owned by Federated from 1929–1988; converted to Macy's
Filene's Basement	1908	1929	2011	Spun off after Federated acquisition by Campeau Corporation in 1988. Closed and liquidated in 2011, later became an online store in 2015 before being stopping again in 2021.
Foley's	1900	2005	2006	Previously owned by Federated from 1947–1988; converted to Macy's
Gold Circle	1967	1967	1988	Closed and liquidated, along with Richway, by Campeau Corporation in 1988.
Gold Triangle	1970	1970	1981	Converted into Richway
Goldsmith's	1870	1959	2005	Co-branded Goldsmith's-Macy's from 2003–2005; converted to Macy's
Hecht's	1857	2005	2006	Converted to Bloomingdale's and Macy's
I. Magnin	1876	1994	1994	Previously owned by Federated from 1964–1987; converted to Macy's
John Taylor Dry Goods Co.	1881	1947	1949	Converted to Macy's in 1949, then sold to and converted into Dillard's in 1980s before being converted into a parking garage for the AT&T Town Pavilion.
The Jones Store	1887	2005	2006	Converted to Macy's
Jordan Marsh	1841	1992	1996	Converted to Macy's
Kaufmann's	1871	2005	2006	Converted to Macy's
L. S. Ayres	1872	2005	2006	Converted to Macy's
Lasalle & Koch	1865	1923	1981	Converted to Macy's
Lazarus	1851	1929	2005	Co-branded Lazarus-Macy's from 2003–2005; converted to Macy's
Liberty House	1849	2001	2001	Converted to Macy's
Lord & Taylor	1826	2005	2021	Sold to NRDC Equity Partners in 2006; Online store online only since 2021.
MainStreet	1983	1983	1988	Sold and converted to Kohl's
Marshall Field's	1852	2005	2006	Converted to Bloomingdale's and Macy's
Meier & Frank	1857	2005	2006	Converted to Macy's
O'Connor, Moffat & Co.	1866	1945	1947	Converted to Macy's
Ralphs	1873	1968	—N/a	Sold to DeBartolo Corporation in 1992
Rich's	1867	1976	2005	Co-branded Rich's-Macy's from 2003–2005; converted to Bloomingdale's and Macy's
Richway	1968	1976	1988	Merged with Gold Circle in 1986 with conversion starting that same year, but some stores retained the Richway name until the remaining stores were closed and liquidated, along with Gold Circle, by Campeau Corporation in 1988.
Rike's	1853	1959	1982	Merged with Shillito's to form Shillito-Rike's
Robinsons-May	1993	2005	2006	Converted to Bloomingdale's and Macy's
Sanger Brothers	1868	1951	1961	Merged with A. Harris and Company to form Sanger-Harris
Sanger-Harris	1961	1961	1987	Converted to Foley's
Shillito's	1830	1929	1982	Merged with Rike's to form Shillito-Rike's
Shillito-Rike's	1982	1982	1986	Converted to Lazarus
Stern's	1867	1992	2001	Converted to Bloomingdale's and Macy's
Strawbridge's	1868	2005	2006	Converted to Macy's
Weinstock's	1924	1995	1995	Majority of stores were converted to Macy's. Remainder of stores were closed/liquidated or sold.

== Criticism ==
The conversion of Marshall Field's in Chicago was particularly criticized, with many customers boycotting its historic State Street flagship store. The Chicago Tribune continues to report on the poor reception of Macy's in Chicago. Pittsburgh customers also strongly resisted the name change from Kaufmann's, in part because of the Kaufmann family role in Pittsburgh history, as well as the central store's Christmas windows and holiday parade.

== Gallery ==
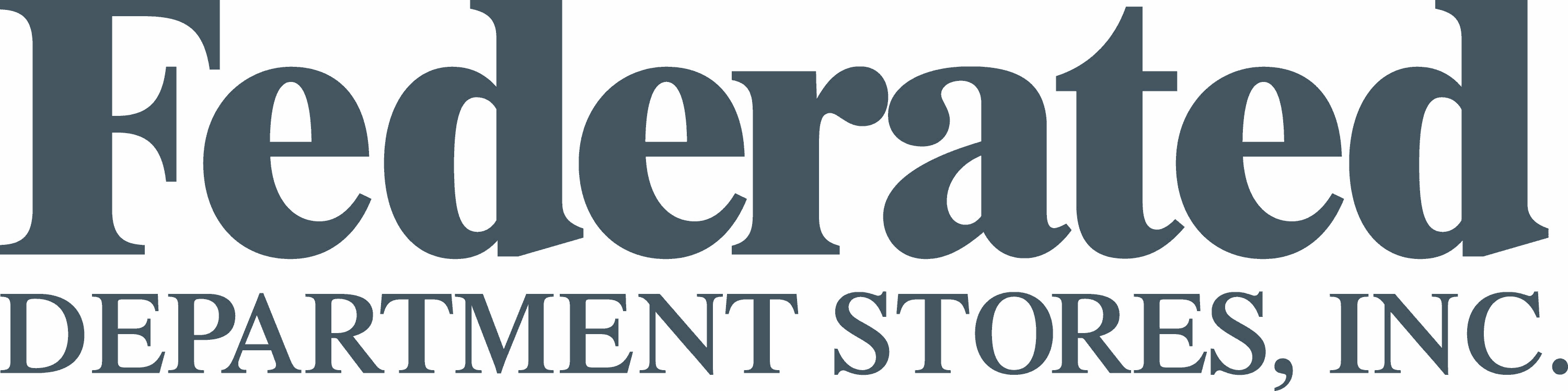
Federated logo until 2007

Macy's, Inc. logo from 2007–2019

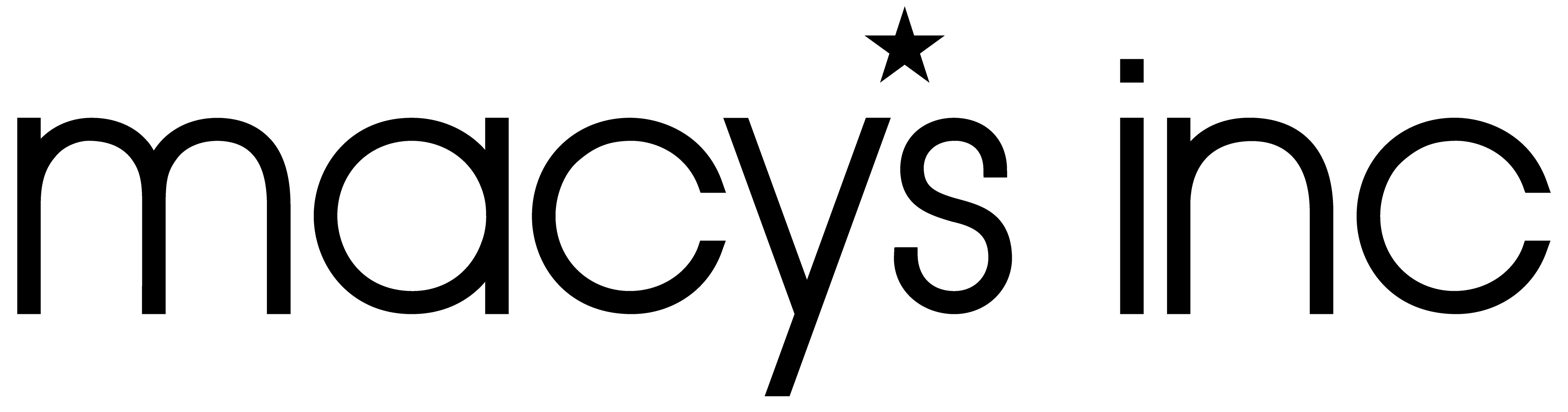
Macy's, Inc. logo from 2019–2023
