= Gold Circle =

American discount department store chain

- Type: Discount department store
- Industry: Retail
- Founded: 1967
- Defunct: 1988
- Fate: Liquidation
- Headquarters: Worthington, Ohio
- Products: Clothing, footwear, bedding, furniture, jewelry, beauty products, electronics, toys, hardware, housewares, and seasonal.

Gold Circle was a discount department store chain based in Ohio. Founded in 1967, it was a division of Federated Department Stores with 76 stores when the chain was sold and dismantled in 1988.

== History ==
Covering mostly New York, Ohio, Kentucky, California and Western Pennsylvania, the chain was founded in 1967 in Columbus, Ohio, with its corporate headquarters and distribution center located in Worthington, Ohio, a northern Columbus suburb. In 1984, Gold Circle was notable as the first major discounter to implement chain-wide UPC barcode scanning in an effort to reduce checkout time for shoppers and improve inventory accuracy and speed store merchandise replenishment.

=== Merger with Richway ===
In 1986, Federated merged its Gold Circle division with its Richway Department Stores, another Federated discount division. While the chains each continued to operate under their original names (though several Richways were converted to Gold Circles), buying and other administrative functions for both were consolidated into Gold Circle's Worthington, Ohio headquarters.

=== Liquidation ===
After Campeau Corporation acquired Federated Department Stores in 1988, Gold Circle was liquidated along with Richway (in addition to the sale or liquidation of several other under-performing Federated divisions). The chain was dismantled in late 1988 with Kimco Development acquiring all of the store locations while the corporate office and distribution center were sold off in separate transactions. Hills leased 35 Gold Circle stores in Ohio, New York, and Kentucky and immediately converted them into Hills stores following the liquidation sales, reopening early in 1989. Some of the Gold Circle stores became Hills Department Stores or Target, while Springfield and Elyria, Ohio, became Kmart. One in New Kensington, Pennsylvania, had previously been converted to a Giant Eagle.

== Gallery ==
Gold Circle Discount Department Stores
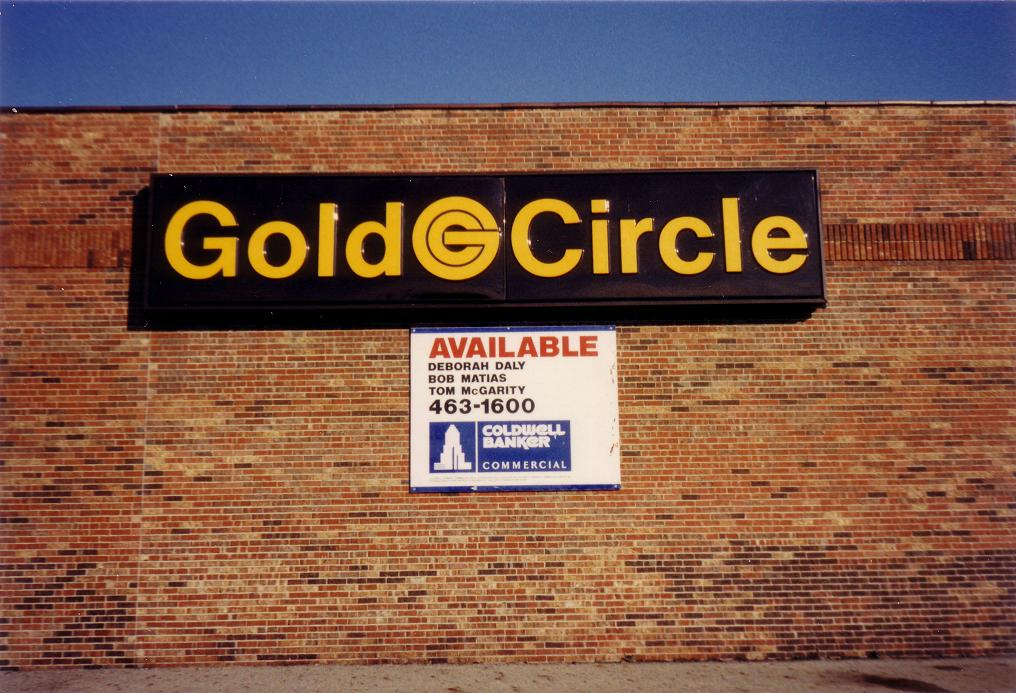
Gold Circle, Olentangy River Rd., Columbus (1989)

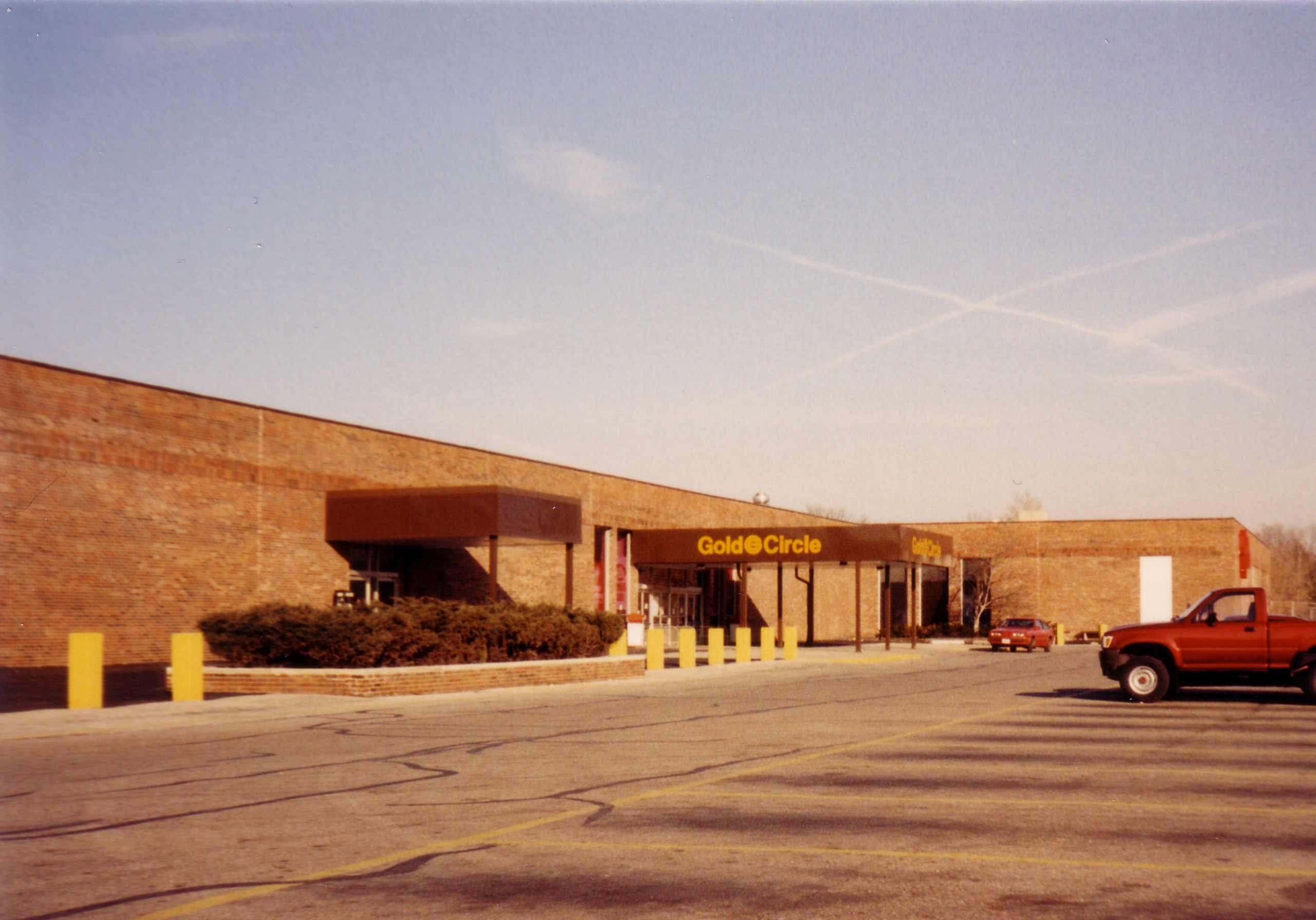
Gold Circle, Olentangy River Rd., Columbus (1989)

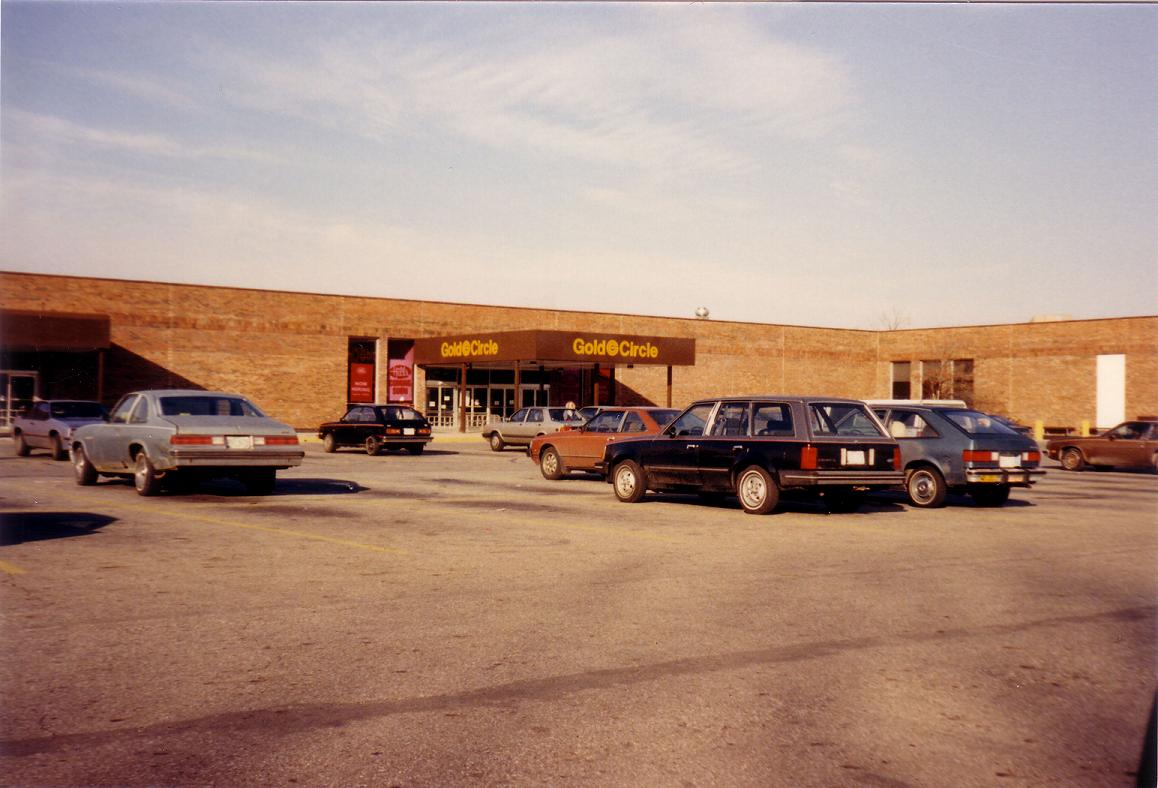
Gold Circle, Olentangy River Rd., Columbus (1989)

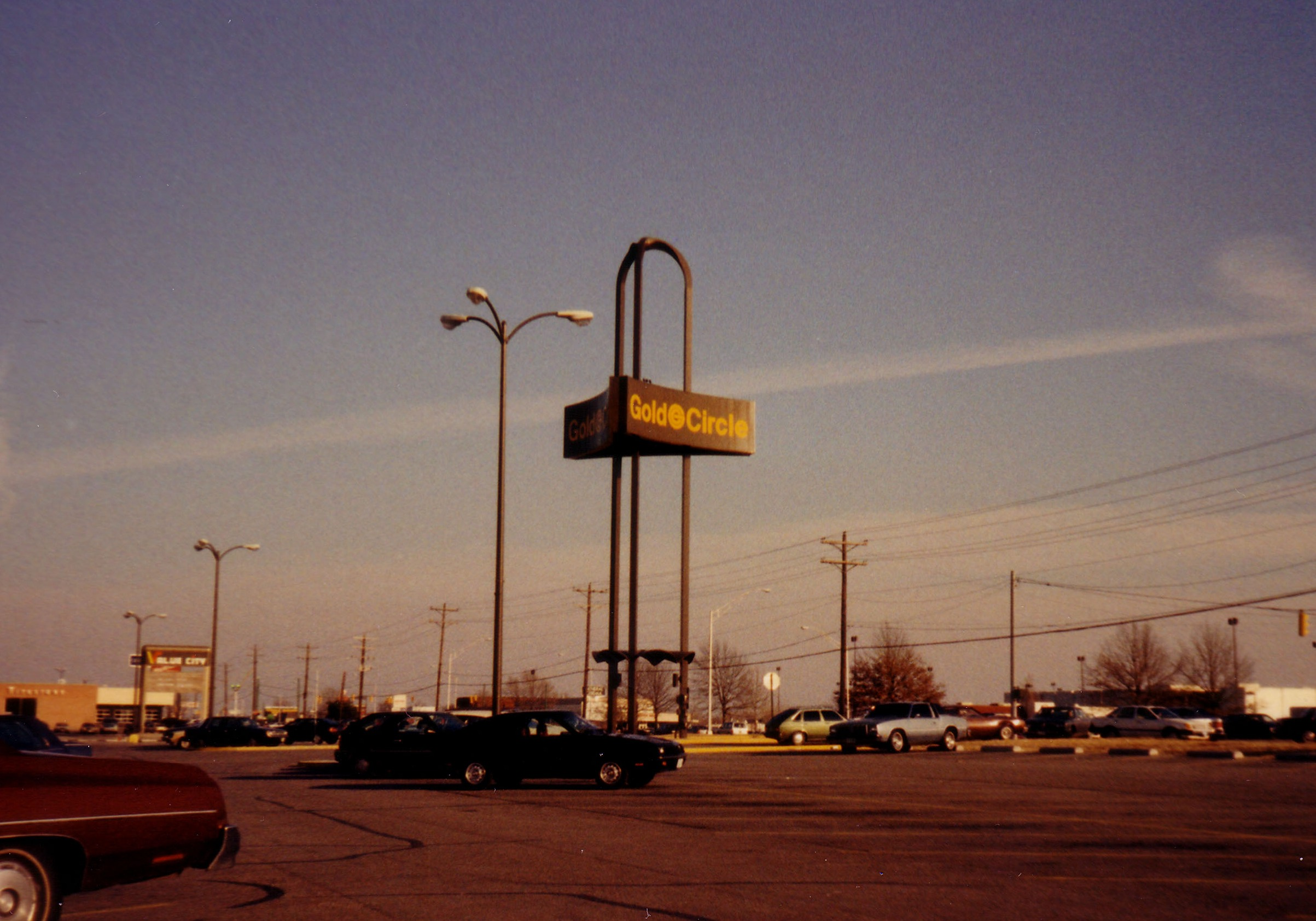
Gold Circle, Morse Rd. Landmark Sign
(Now Frankin County Board of Elections)
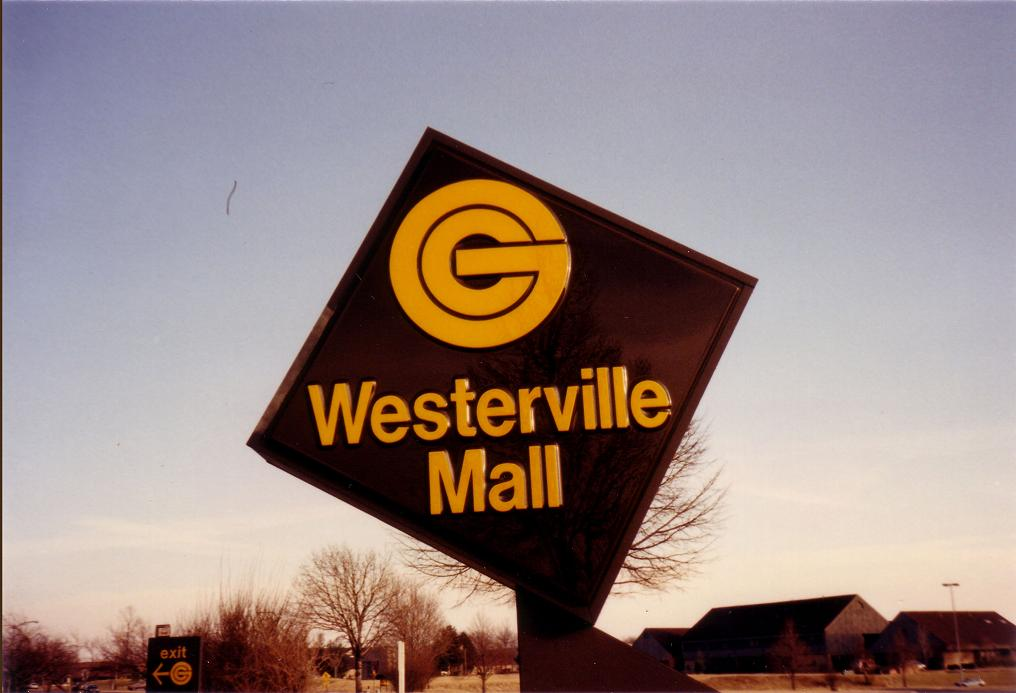
Gold Circle Westerville Mall (1989)

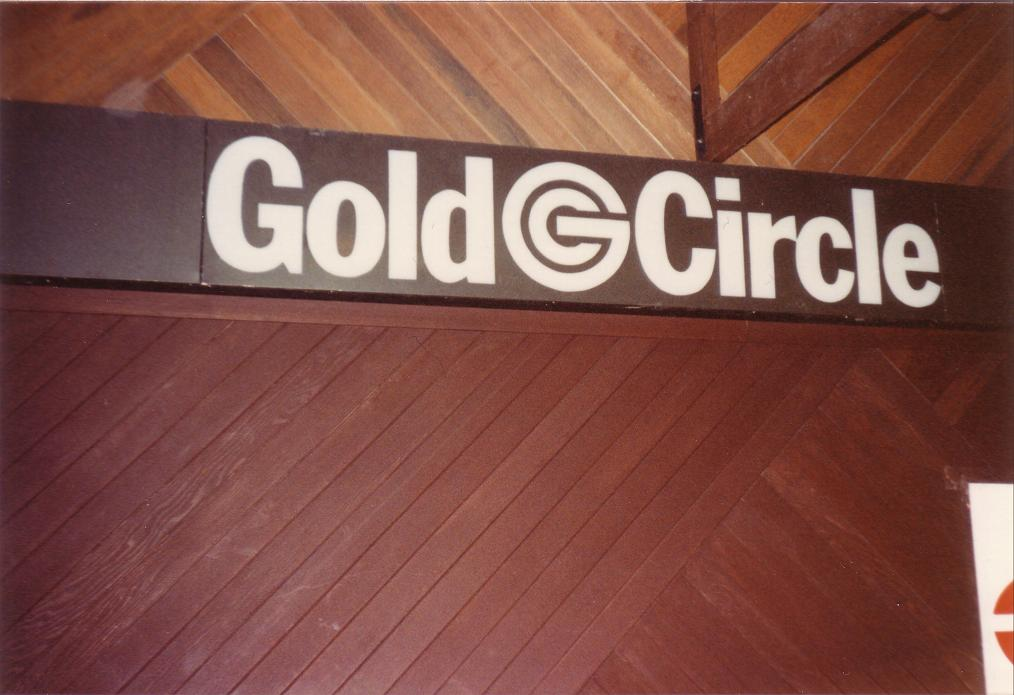
Gold Circle Westerville Mall - Mall Entrance (1989)

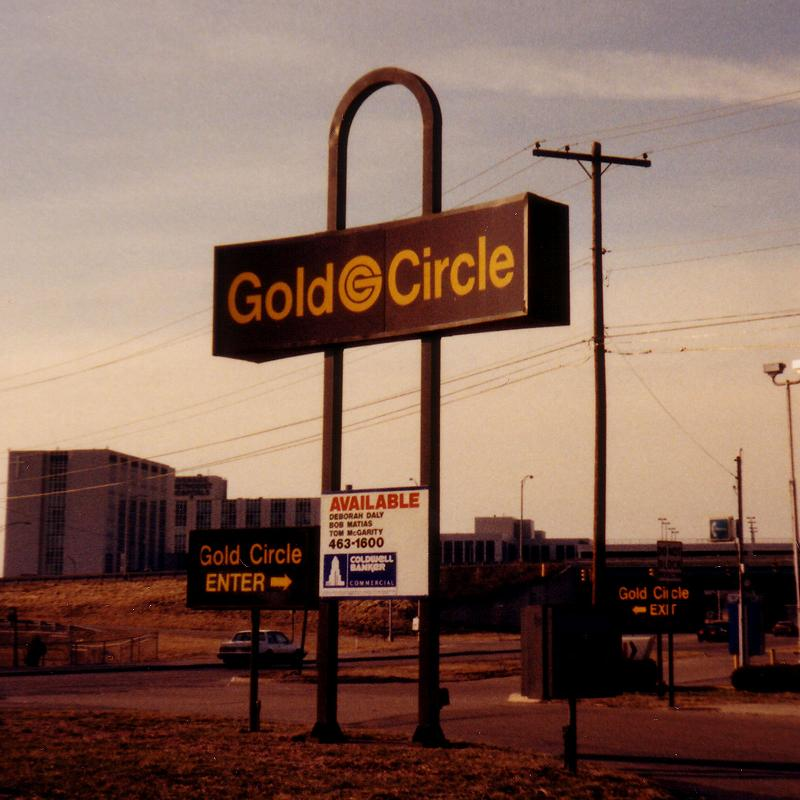
Gold Circle, Olentangy River Rd., Columbus (1989)

== See also ==
- List of defunct department stores of the United States
