= Roswell Town Center =

Shopping center in Roswell, Georgia, US

Roswell Mall
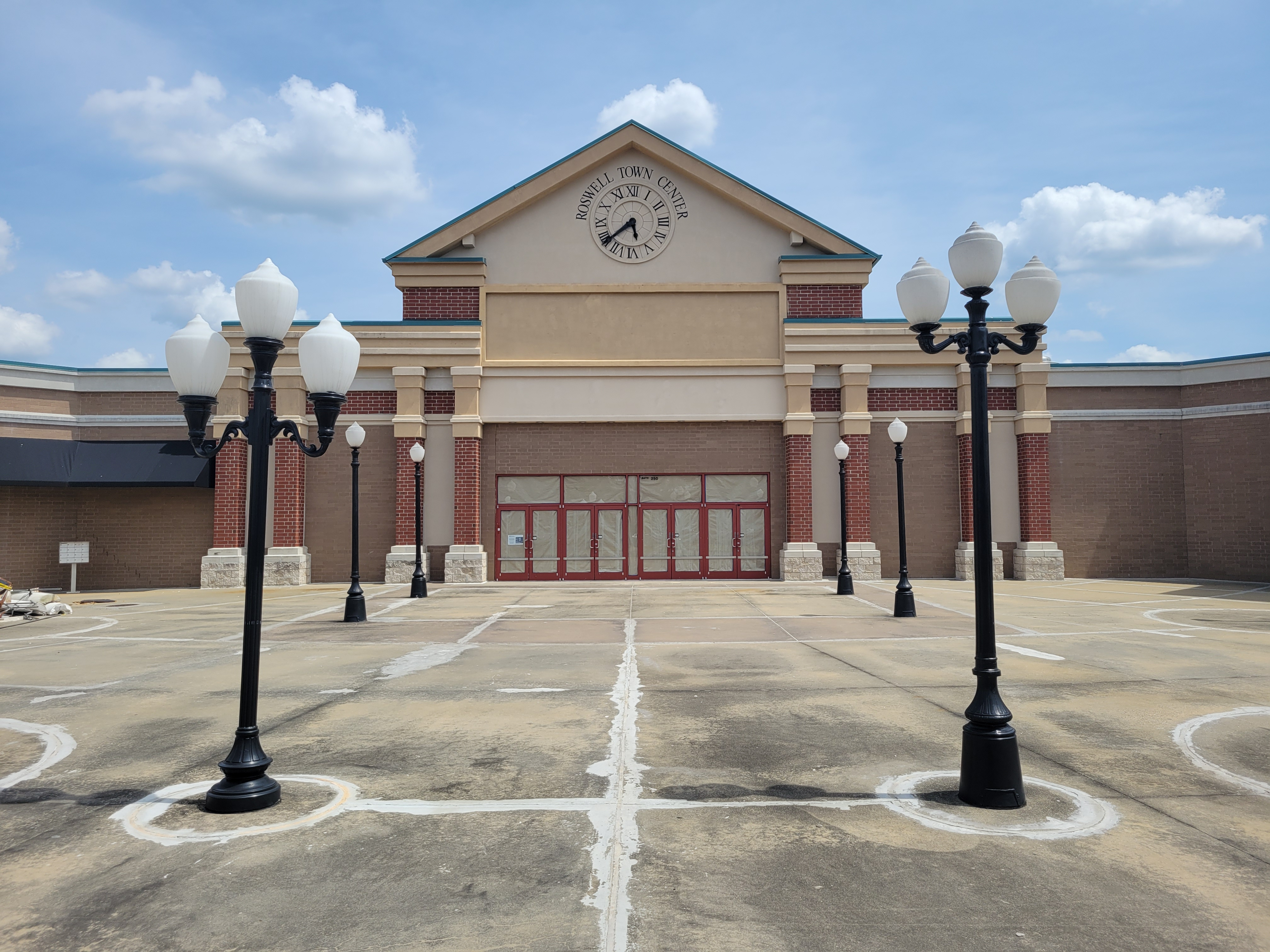
- Roswell Town Center
- Location: Roswell, Georgia, United States
- Coordinates: 34°2′17″N 84°20′26″W
- Opened: 1974
- Num. of stores: 2
- Num. of anchor tenants: 1
- Floor area: 50,000 sq ft (4,600 m^{2})
- Floors: 2

Roswell Town Center, formerly Roswell Mall, is a shopping center located in Roswell, Georgia, built in 1974. It is situated at the intersection of Holcomb Bridge Road and Alpharetta Highway. This mall is not to be confused with the bigger, newer North Point Mall in Alpharetta, Georgia.

Originally, Roswell Mall was a 400,000 sq ft (37,000 m^{2}), two-level mall and was anchored by Richway and later Uptons (the first store of the now-defunct chain) in 1985, and K-Mart.

In April 1994, the mall was purchased by Talisman Cos. LLC and was reformed into an open-air center. By 1997, it was referred to as "Roswell Town Center", and although it was no longer an enclosed mall, it still had two levels. Over the course of three years, the exterior was remodeled while the interior was demolished. Talisman renewed the leases for anchors K-Mart and Target (formerly Richway), while Uptons left. The movie theater, run by Startime Entertainment, was also remodeled. The renovations to the shopping center added 100,000 sq ft (9,300 m^{2}) to the structure. Construction on the $10 million family entertainment complex began in October 1997. The movie theater closed in 2007 due to the late-2000's recession and reopened as a privately owned movie theater in 2011. As of 2023, the shopping center includes Big Lots, Floor & Decor, and Tuesday Morning. In 2024, Big Lots closed and is not occupied by any store. Tuesday Morning was replaced by a Spirit Halloween.
