= Plaza del Sol (Gresham, Oregon) =

- Location within Oregon
- Type: Plaza
- Addresses: Southeast Stark Street and 187th Avenue
- Location: Gresham, Oregon
- Coordinates: 45.51944°N 122.47111°W

Other
- Known for: Features an art installation and model of the solar system

Plaza del Sol is a plaza located at Southeast Stark Street and 187th Avenue in Gresham, Oregon's Rockwood neighborhood, in the United States. It features an art installation and model of the Solar System, created in 2009. The site was formerly occupied by a Fred Meyer store, and purchased by the city in 2005.

== Events ==
In 2013, the plaza hosted a Cinco de Mayo festival and the Feast of All Nations. The plaza has hosted Rock the Block, which attracted thousands of people in 2015.
