= Uptons =

Department store in Atlanta, Georgia

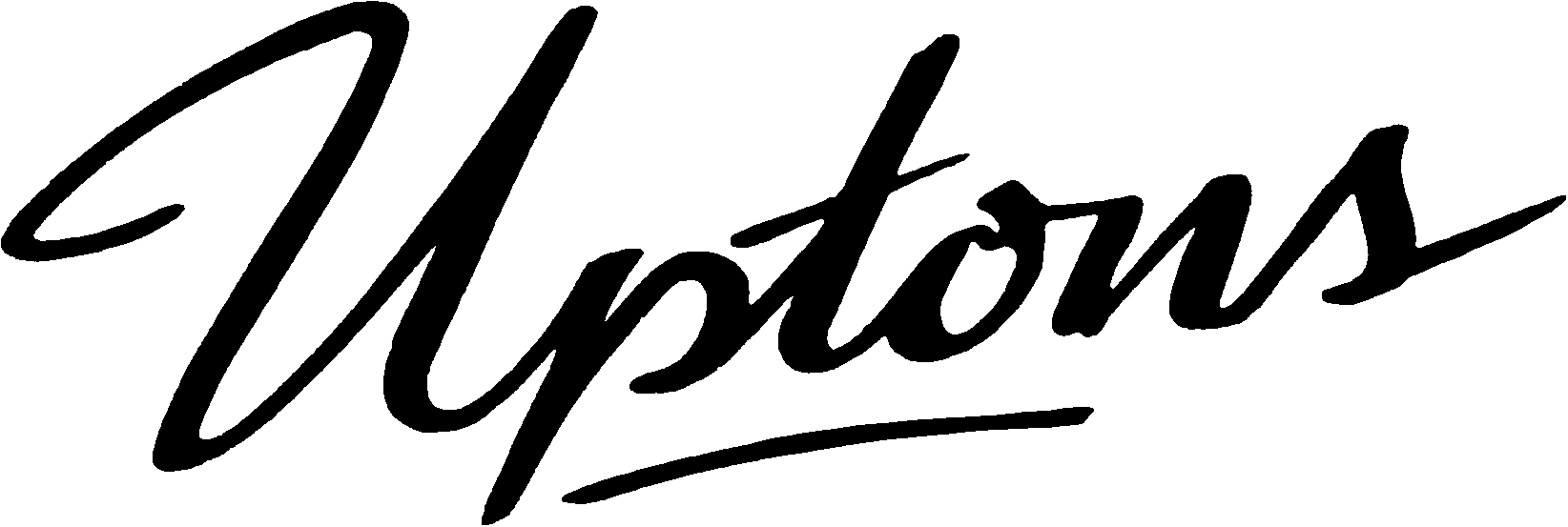
- Type: department store
- Industry: retail
- Founded: 1985
- Founder: George Upton; Bobby Upton
- Defunct: 2000
- Fate: Divested by American Retail Group
- Headquarters: Norcross, Georgia, United States
- Number of locations: 75
- Area served: Southeastern United States
- Owner: American Retail Group

Uptons was a department store based in Atlanta, Georgia, United States. The chain operated primarily in the Southeastern United States, with locations in Florida, Georgia, Tennessee, Maryland, North Carolina, South Carolina, and Virginia. The chain was closed in 1999.

== History ==
The first Uptons opened at Roswell Mall in Roswell, Georgia in 1985. Two stores later opened in other parts of Atlanta. In 1987, Uptons acquired 14 stores from Meyers-Arnold of Greenville, South Carolina.

Thirty-seven locations of the Florida-based J. Byrons department store chain were acquired in 1996. A year later, the company moved its headquarters from Norcross (a suburb of metro Atlanta) into the nearby Peachtree Corners area in Technology Park Atlanta.

In July 1999, American Retail Group decided that maintaining the Uptons chain was too costly. By 2000, the chain had closed the last of its seventy-five stores. At the time, American Retail Group also owned clothing retailer Maurices, Inc.; sporting goods chain Eastern Mountain Sports, Inc; and The Hub, Inc. (which comprised the clothing chains Millers Outpost, Levi's Outlet by M.O.S.T., Dockers Outlet by M.O.S.T., Juxtapose and Anchor Blue).
