= Bluemercury =

American skincare store

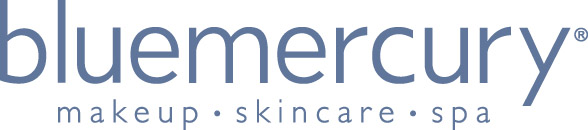

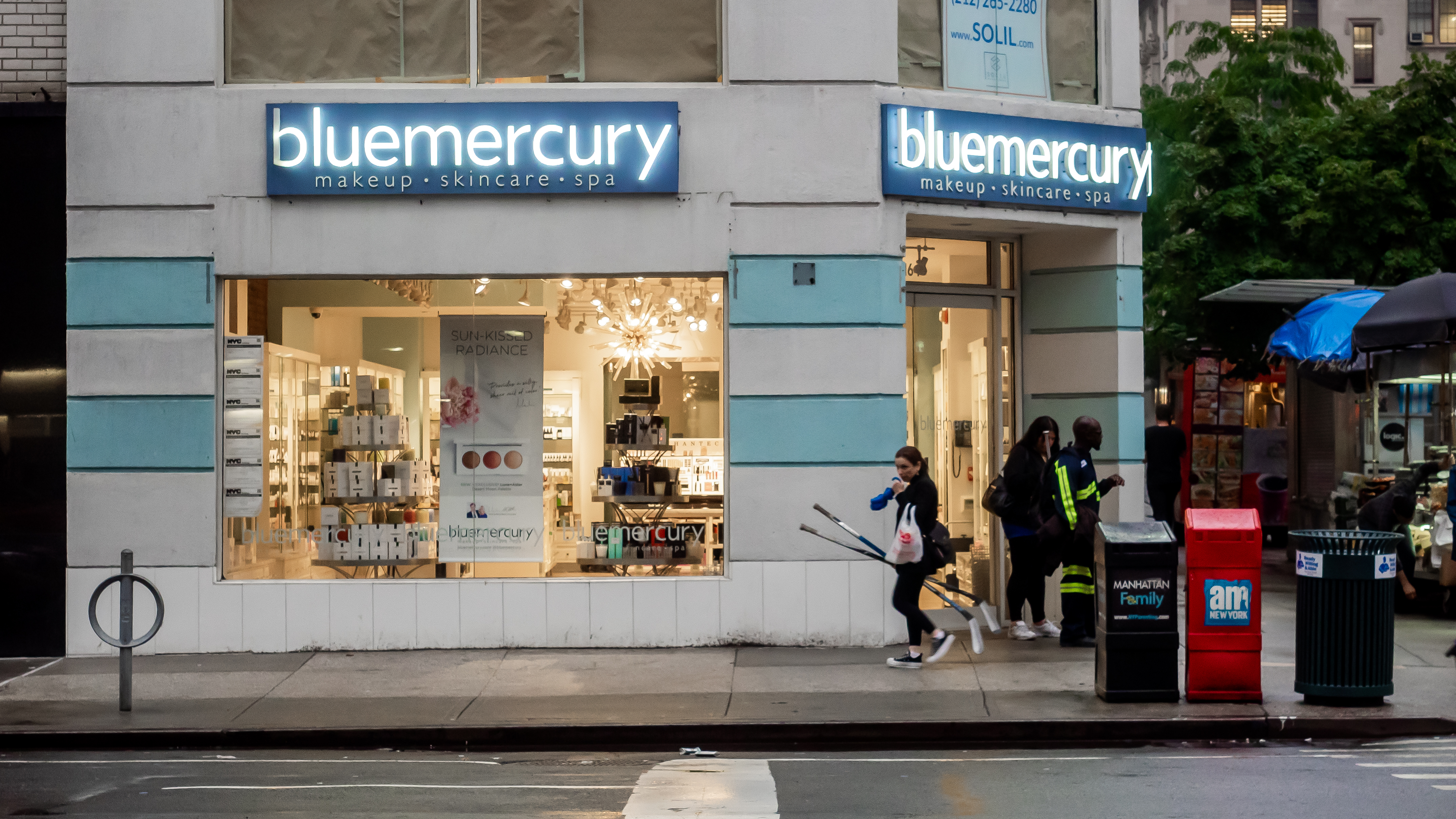
- Storefront in Manhattan (2019)
- Type: Subsidiary
- Industry: Cosmetics
- Founded: 1999; 27 years ago, in Washington, D.C.
- Founders: Barry J. Beck and Marla Malcolm Beck
- Headquarters: Washington, D.C., United States
- Number of locations: 158 (Q3 2022)
- Brands: M-61, Lune+Aster
- Parent: Macy's, Inc.
- Website: Official website

Bluemercury is an American luxury beauty retailer founded in 1999 in Georgetown, Washington, D.C. The company offers a curated assortment of skincare, hair care, cosmetics, and fragrance brands, with a focus on personalized in-store client services.

In addition to carrying other brands, Bluemercury has its own proprietary skincare and color cosmetic brands, M-61 (launched in 2012) and Lune+Aster (launched in 2015).

Bluemercury operates retail locations across the United States and is a subsidiary of Macy's, Inc., which acquired the company in 2015. Its headquarters are located in Long Island City, New York.

== History ==
Bluemercury was founded in 1999 as an online retailer of luxury cosmetics by Marla Malcom (later Marla Malcolm Beck) and Barry J. Beck, who became CEO and COO, respectively. Early on, the company faced challenges as luxury brands hesitate to sell online, and consumers were unaccustomed to purchasing cosmetics without trying them first.

The couple acquired two struggling independent beauty boutiques in Georgetown and Dupont Circle called EFX, which they used to fulfill online orders. They rebranded the stores as "Bluemercury," converting them into their emerging concept—neighborhood locations offering beauty products, personalized advice and samples.

By 2006, Bluemercury had grown to 12 stores and generated $17 million in annual revenue. In June of that year, the Becks sold a stake in the company to the private-equity firm Invus Group. That same year, Bluemercury establishes its own skincare brand, M-61. In 2015, the company launched Lune+Aster, a color cosmetics brand.

In 2015, Bluemercury was sold to Macy's, Inc. for $210 million, while the Becks retained their roles as CEO and COO.

Maly Bernstein stepped down as CEO in September 2025. In July 2026, the company announced that Alexandre Choueiri would take over as CEO in August. Choueiri previously held executive roles with Kering Beauté and L’Oréal.

=== Macy's acquisition ===
After the 2015 acquisition, Macy's, Inc. added Bluemercury stores inside several Macy's department stores; the first three in California and one in Houston were launched in 2016. As of 2025, Bluemercury has pivoted away from shop in shop locations inside of Macy's department stores, instead prioritizing the core of its business—freestanding neighborhood locations.

=== Retail stores ===
Bluemercury stores are found in affluent neighborhoods across the United States and emphasize personalized client service. The stores carry an assortment of brands including Chantecaille, Diptyque, Oribe, Parfums De Marly, Sisley Paris, and SkinCeuticals among others.

In 2016, Bluemercury opened its 100th store, in Savannah, Georgia. At 2,400 square feet, it was their first entry into a larger retail format. In 2017, the company opened a 2,700 square-foot store in Manhattan, its 145th store. In November 2023, Bluemercury launch its first Store of the Future in its New Blue format in New Canaan, Connecticut.
