= J. Byrons =

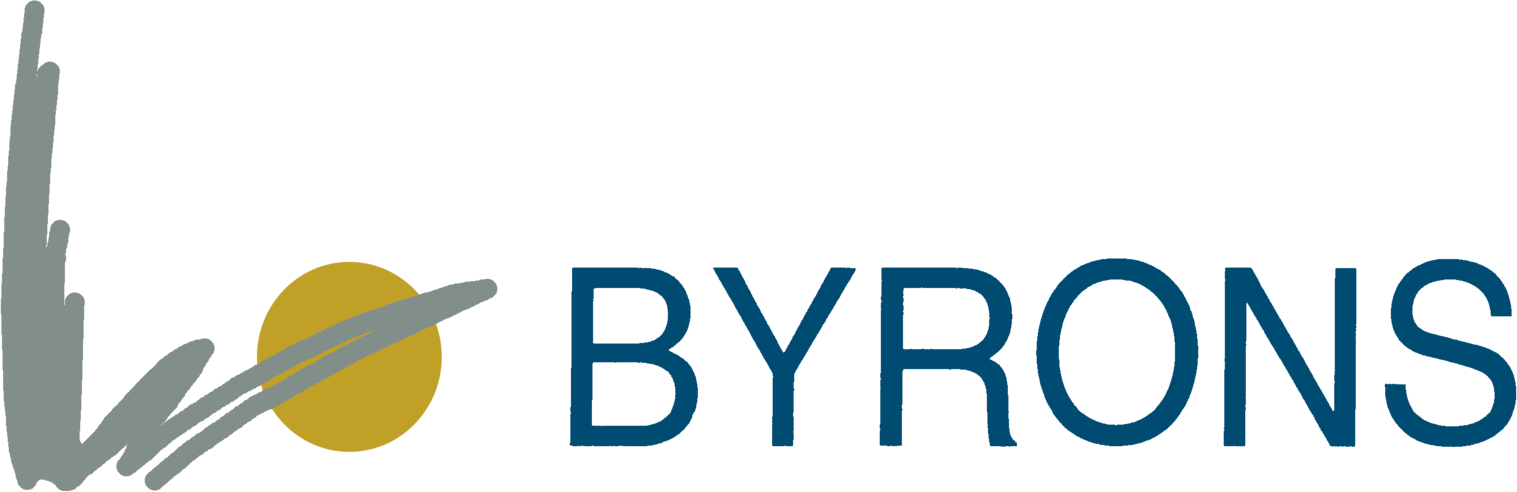
- Type: division of Eckerd Corporation
- Industry: Retail
- Founded: Miami, Florida, 1896
- Defunct: 1996
- Fate: Acquired
- Successor: Uptons
- Number of locations: 54
- Area served: Florida
- Products: Clothing

Byrons, also known as J. Byrons, Jbyrons, or Jackson Byrons, was an American mid-priced department store chain in Miami, Florida.

Byrons was founded in 1896 as a pharmacy called Byrons Red Cross. In 1947, the Byrons flagship store on Flagler Street was renamed Byrons Department Store. In April, 1958, Jackson's Stores bought Byron's, adding it to their existing six store chain and renaming the stores Jackson-Byron's. Pharmacy chain Eckerd Corporation bought J. Byron, which at the time comprised 12 stores, in 1968. They sold the chain in 1985. At the same time, the chain exited Orlando and sold its four stores there to Ross Dress for Less.

Their commercials featured the jingle "The right look, the right price, JByrons" (changed to "at Byrons" after the name changed when also the kid say: "Hey, you dropped the "J!") in the Spanish jingle "Es mi moda, al precio justo, JByrons" (changed to "en Byrons") Later commercials featured the jingle "At Byrons the magic, the magic is in the prices" also in the Spanish jingle "En Byrons, la magia, la magia están en los precios."

In 1991, the chain dropped the "J" from its name. Five years later, 17 of the Byrons stores were closed, and the remaining 37 were sold to Uptons.
