= Grand Central Mall =

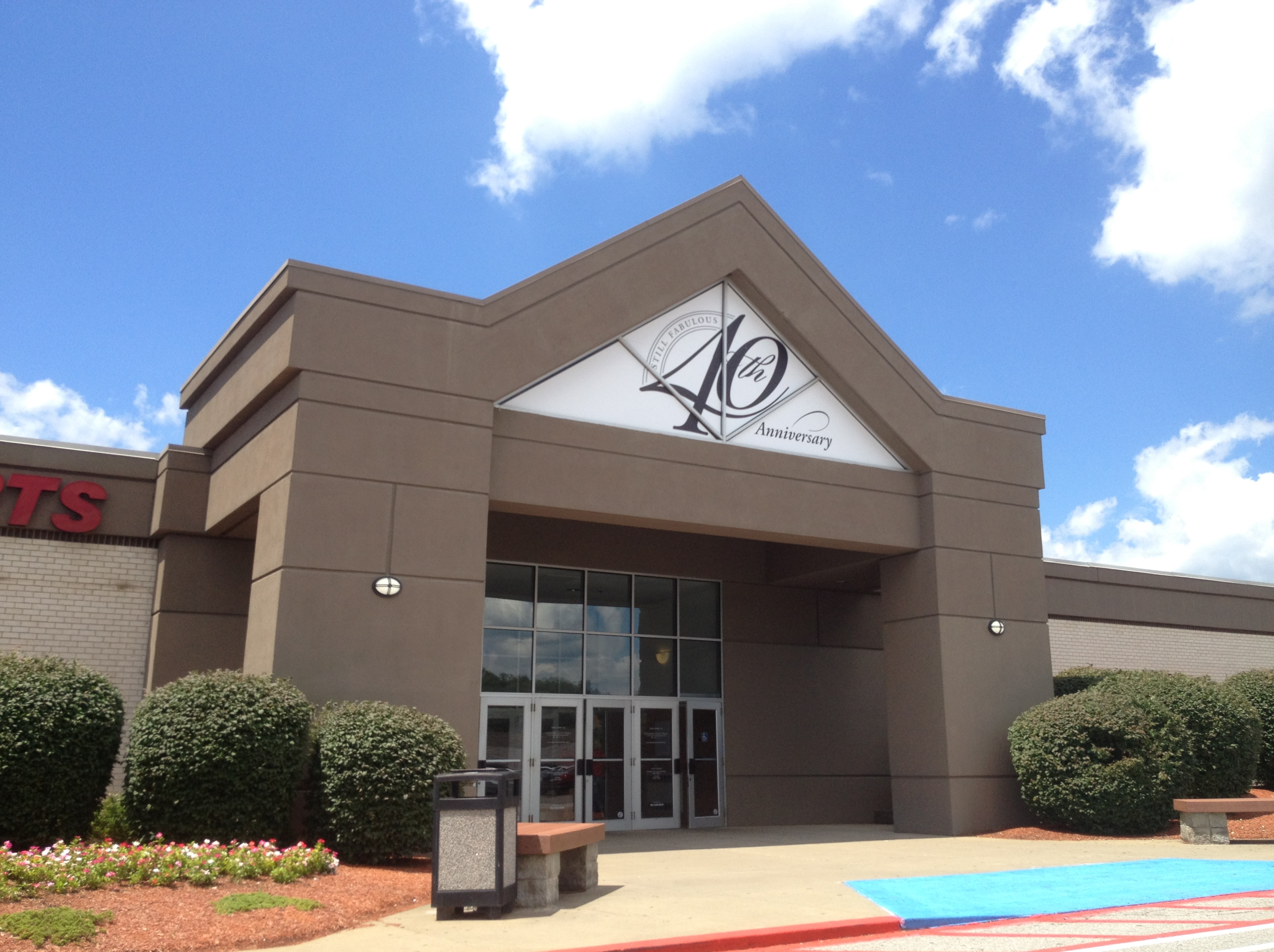
- Grand Central Mall entrance, July 2013
- Location: Vienna, West Virginia, United States
- Coordinates: 39°18′4″N 81°33′9″W
- Opened: 1972; 54 years ago
- Developer: Eugene Lebowitz
- Owner: Cafaro Company
- Num. of stores: 90
- Num. of anchor tenants: 9 (8 open, 1 vacant)
- Floor area: 908,238 square feet (84,378.1 m^{2})
- Floors: 1
- Website: grandcentralmall.com

Grand Central Mall is a 908,238-square-foot (84,378.1 m^{2}) regional shopping mall in Vienna, West Virginia, near the larger city of Parkersburg. The mall opened in 1972 and is the only enclosed mall within 35 miles of its region. It features more than 90 tenants, including a food court. The mall has eight anchor stores: Belk Outlet, JCPenney, Dunham's Sports, PetSmart, TJ Maxx, HomeGoods, Ross Dress For Less, and a Regal movie theater; it also has one vacant anchor previously occupied by Elder-Beerman. The mall is owned by the Cafaro Company.

== History ==
Grand Central Mall opened in 1972 as the only enclosed mall within the Mid-Ohio Valley region. At the time, the mall included The Diamond (a branch of the Associated Dry Goods chain), JCPenney, Sears, and a G.C. Murphy dime store among its anchors. The Diamond closed in 1983 and was later converted to Stone & Thomas, which in turn became Elder-Beerman after the Stone & Thomas chain was acquired in 1998. Phar-Mor, a discount pharmacy chain, was later added to the mall.

Glimcher Realty Trust acquired the mall in 1993. Three years later, the company invested in an $8 million expansion, which brought a food court and a new movie theater. Phase 2 of the expansion comprised a Proffitt's (now Belk) anchor store, which was also added to Glimcher's Morgantown Mall in Morgantown, West Virginia the same year. These two stores were the first Proffitt's stores in West Virginia. Phar-Mor closed in 2002 and eventually became Steve & Barry's.

Steve & Barry's, a former anchor store, closed in September 2008. The space is now occupied by Dunham's Sports.

In November 2002, Toys R Us, Olive Garden, Long John Silver’s and Outback Steakhouse opened outside the mall. In 2016, Long John Silver’s was replaced with Popeyes Louisiana Kitchen. In 2019, Toys R Us was replaced with Big Lots. On March 1, 2022, Ruby Tuesday was replaced with Longhorn Steakhouse.

On November 28, 2017, it was announced that Elder-Beerman would be closing on January 31, 2018. A 20,000 square foot portion of the store was converted to the first H&M store in West Virginia. H&M closed in the summer of 2025.

On September 18, 2018, Sears announced that its store would be closing as part of a plan to close 12 stores nationwide. The store closed in December 2018.

On March 11, 2021, two of the four new tenants to be built on the former Sears property, TJ Maxx and HomeGoods, opened their doors. The third tenant, PetSmart, opened on March 27, 2021. The final new tenant, Ross Dress for Less, opened on July 16, 2021.

On June 17, 2023, Belk downgraded its full-line store into an outlet store.

On October 1st, 2025, the Cafaro Company acquired the Grand Central Mall for $54 Million.

March 18, 2026 - The Cafaro Company announced a multimillion-dollar renovation project set to transform Grand Central Mall with upgrades and new attractions. The announcement also included a ceremonial “nail-driving” marking the start of renovations.

November 6, 2026 - Grand Central Mall celebrated its grand reopening with a ribbon-cutting ceremony. Anthony Cafaro Jr., co-President of the mall's parent company, stated: "This is not the finish line. It's a new beginning."
