= J. N. Adam & Co. =

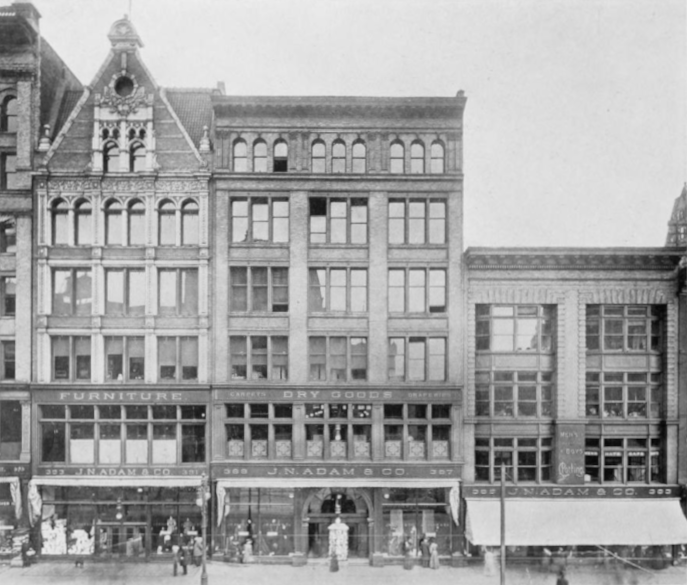
- c. 1908
- Industry: Retail
- Founded: 1881
- Defunct: 1960
- Fate: Liquidation
- Headquarters: Buffalo, New York
- Key people: James N. Adam (founder)
- Products: General merchandise
- Parent: Associated Dry Goods Corporation

The J. N. Adam & Co., commonly referred to as J. N.'s, was a department store located in Buffalo, New York that became part of the Associated Dry Goods Corporation.

== History ==
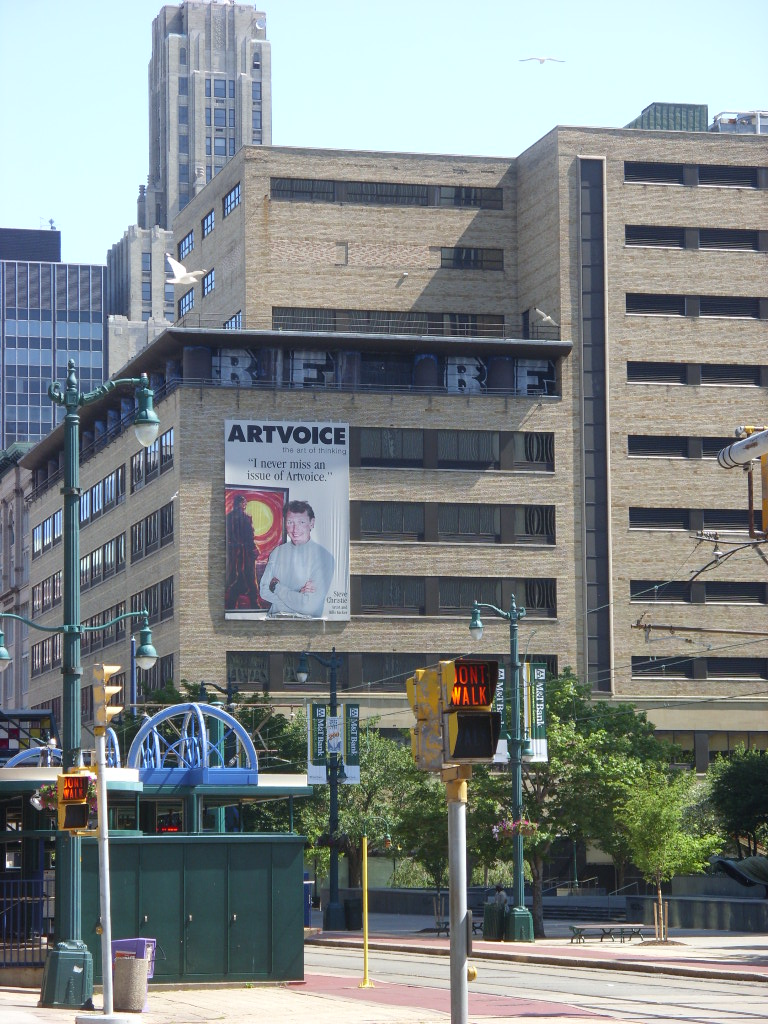
Former J. N. Adam & Co. flagship store, June 2009

The J. N. Adam & Co. was founded in 1881 by James Noble Adam, a brother of Robert B. Adam, a founder of AM&A's, another Buffalo based department store. The co-founder of the store was William H. Hotchkiss who, in 1905, negotiated the purchase of rival store Hengerer's. Both stores continued to operate and, in 1916, became initial parts of the Associated Dry Goods Corporation.

The downtown store was initially located at 292 Main Street. They later moved to the corner of Main and Eagle Streets, where over a span of thirty years they built a massive 600,000 sq. ft. downtown store. The flagship store was designed by architects Starrett & van Vleck, who also designed the Downtown Athletic Club and the flagship stores of Lord and Taylor, Bloomingdales, and Saks Fifth Avenue in New York City.

In 1937, a satellite branch of J. N. Adam & Co. opened at 114-120 Falls Street in Niagara Falls, New York.

=== Closure ===
J. N.'s closed in 1960, and the Buffalo store became the new home for the downtown location of AM&A's. The flagship store operated as a Bon Ton until 1995. On February 20, 2009, the former store complex was added to the National Register of Historic Places as the J. N. Adam–AM&A Historic District. In 2015, a New York City-based development group purchased the building with the intention of converting it into a 10 floor, 300-room, Asian-themed hotel and restaurant complex.

== See also ==
- J. N. Adam–AM&A Historic District
