= Powers Dry Goods =

Powers Department Store
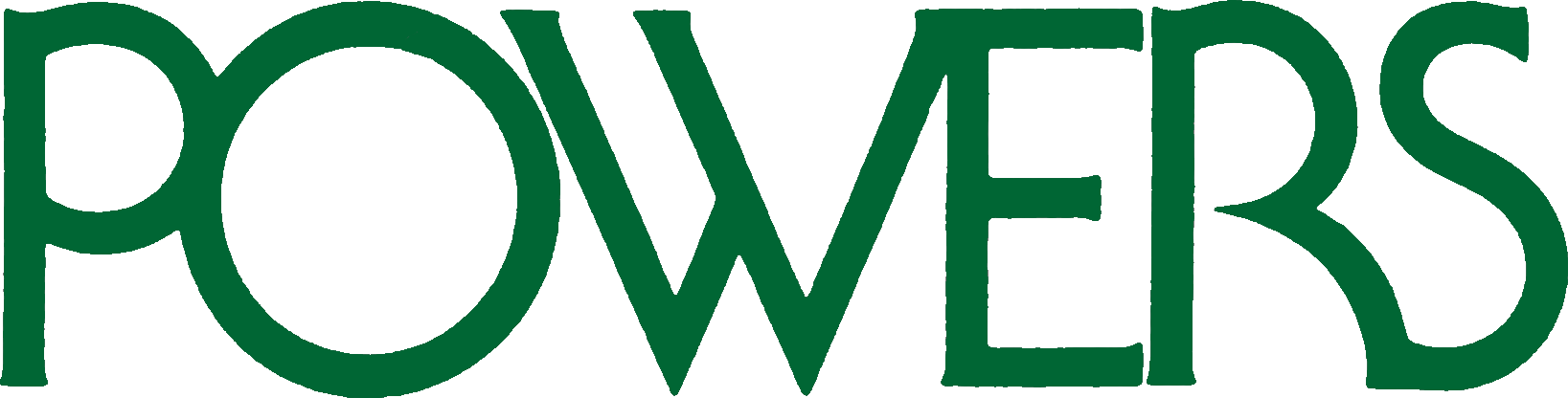
- Industry: Department Stores
- Predecessor: S.E. Olson Co.; Powers Mercantile
- Founded: 1881; 145 years ago in Minneapolis
- Defunct: 1985
- Fate: Sold and Renamed
- Headquarters: Minneapolis, Minnesota, United States

The Powers Department Store of Minneapolis, Minnesota was a department store chain with roots dating to 1873, and that, at its peak, consisted of 7 locations in Minnesota.

== History ==
=== S. E. Olson & Co. ===
Norwegian immigrant Seaver E. Olson formed a partnership with John C. Smith and John Paul in La Crosse, Wisconsin in 1873 to open a retail, wholesale, and dry goods company. In 1875 the partnership was dissolved, and S.E. Olson opened his own company, which he ran until 1878. At that time, S.E. Olson left La Crosse and relocated to Minneapolis to join prosperous dry goods seller N.B. Harwood.

By May 1884, there was a legal disagreement between S.E. Olson and N.B. Harwood, which resulted in S.E. Olson forming a new business partnership with former coworker M.D. Ingram, and P.A. Larson. The new company, called Ingram, Olson & Co., purchased inventory, along with a building located at 325 Nicollet Avenue, from the estate of Eugene Lehmaier in July 1885. By October 1886, Ingram, Olson & Co was the leading dry goods seller in Minneapolis, with a newly remodeled store and expanded departments. The Ingram & Olson partnership was dissolved in July 1887 due to M.D. Ingram's deteriorating health, and later newspaper advertising was only in the name of S.E. Olson & Co. The business continued to grow, and S.E. Olson & Co. occupied a five-story building at 213 and 215 Nicollet Avenue in January 1889.

It was announced in April 1893 that S.E. Olson & Co. would be relocating to the corner of First Avenue South (later Marquette Avenue) and Fifth Street in Minneapolis. The new building had an estimated construction cost of $200,000, (~$6.47 million in 2024) and a spectacular grand opening in March 1894.

In December 1901 it was announced S.E. Olson retired from business, and S.E. Olson & Co had been acquired and was now known as Powers Mercantile Company

=== Powers Mercantile ===
Powers Mercantile Company was originally named Powers Brothers, and established by brothers Alonzo J. "A.J." and E.F. Powers in Saint Paul, Minnesota. Powers Brothers was a wholesale and retail business, and later on they abandoned the wholesale side of the business, and renamed themselves Powers Dry Goods. In 1900, A.J.'s son Fred came to Minneapolis and took over the management of S.E. Olson & Co. In 1902 A.J. sold his interest in Powers Brothers, and joined his son Fred in Minneapolis, where they acquired S.E. Olson & Co., and renamed it Powers Mercantile Company.

A large fire in the retail district of downtown Minneapolis in December 1904 saw Powers Mercantile's building suffer $60,000 in building damages, and $165,000 in inventory losses. While having the fire damage repaired, it was decided at this time to construct a new facade and expansion to the store in order to make it the largest retail establishment in Minneapolis. In an effort to further continue growth and expansion, Powers Mercantile leased Yerxa Corner in September 1906 so that they could expand their footprint in downtown Minneapolis. They constructed a new five-story building which expanded the existing structure from First Avenue to Nicollet at a cost of nearly $1,000,000, which included the largest pane glass windows west of Chicago. In 1909 Powers Mercantile was one of two Minneapolis retail establishments, the other being Donaldson's, to shorten their hours to ease employee workloads.

In a merger, Powers Mercantile became a part of a newly formed corporation in 1909, United Dry Goods of Delaware. Powers was acquired along with the Associated Merchants Company and three other large stores. A.J. Powers said that the merger would have no effect on daily operations of Powers Mercantile, and that he was still in charge as long as he was able to do so.

A.J. Powers retired in April 1915, and died in October 1915 on a train from Pittsburgh to Chicago. He became ill while visiting his son Fred, who had previously relocated to Pittsburgh, and was en route to a hospital in Rochester, Minnesota when he died. Fred later died in 1935 in Atlantic City, New Jersey, and was buried in Minneapolis

December 1915 brought about a large merger between United Dry Goods and Associated Merchants to form a new corporation named Associated Dry Goods.

The treasurer of Powers' parent company, Theron Atwater, became the president of Powers; and George E. Merrifield was the general manager of the store in 1916. The store continued to be prosperous, and Minneapolis was considered a healthy area of the country for the sale of dry goods.

By 1924 Powers advertising no longer referred to Power's Mercantile, and only used the Powers name.

In 1929, Powers became the first store in Minneapolis to install an escalator.

=== Powers Dry Goods ===
Powers Mercantile underwent a name change in 1937, and became listed as a Virginia corporation known as Powers Dry Goods.

After an unsuccessful attempt to expand to Edina, Minnesota in 1950, Powers opened their first suburban store in St. Louis Park, Minnesota in 1955 in Knollwood Plaza. By doing so, Powers became the first downtown Minneapolis store with a suburban branch. In June 1967 it was announced that the Knollwood Plaza store would be further expanded, with an additional 40,000 square feet added to the existing store.

In August 1958 Powers disclosed they were further expanding their retail footprint in the Twin Cities by building a new stand alone 3 story store in the Highland Village area of St. Paul, Minnesota. The new store opened March 17, 1960 with 92,000 square feet of retail space, and parking for 500 cars.

Powers updated their flagship Minneapolis location in 1966 by removing the exterior fire escapes, resurfacing the exterior with textured glass, and constructing awnings and new entrances. The downtown shopping area of Minneapolis was also undergoing a renovation at this time, as the Nicollet Mall project was introduced to make Nicollet Avenue a pedestrian only area. Powers supported the plan, but objected to the assessment requiring the plan to be funded based on property land values.

During May 1971 Powers combined with Sears to purchase a 114-acre tract of land for a new mall to be built in Burnsville, Minnesota. Powers planned to construct a 130,000 square foot anchor store at the proposed mall. It was reported at this time that Powers would erect a new store in Blaine, Minnesota also. Later that same year Powers further continued their planned expansion, stating they would also be participating as an anchor in a planned mall to be later built in Eden Prairie, Minnesota by the Homart Development Company.

Powers acknowledged in 1972 they were in third place in department store operations in Minneapolis, behind Donaldson's and Dayton's, and their planned expansion of stores was designed to double their retail footprint in the Twin Cities. Powers also attributed their growth to the discontinuation of outdated departments, and targeting younger clientele. They anticipated their sales volume would be greatly increased by doubling their retail space, concentrating on middle sized stores, and continuing to plan further expansions.

The Blaine, Minnesota store opened in Northtown Mall (Blaine, Minnesota) in October 1972, becoming the fourth store in the Powers chain. The two-story Northtown store reflected Powers' new image, with colors and lighting that were considered current, as well as boutique areas, and a luncheonette. The Northtown Powers branch also had a budget store, which was a first for the chain in a suburban location.

Maplewood Mall in Maplewood, Minnesota began construction in May 1972, and Powers was announced as one of the three anchor stores. Powers Maplewood store became the fifth store in the chain when they opened their two-story, 135,000 square foot store in July 1974.

Eden Prairie Center was the newest area mall in the Twin Cities in 1976, and Powers opened their sixth area store there March 3, 1976. Alden Berman, retiring president of Powers at the time, admitted in March 1976 that every time a suburban mall store branch opens, it cuts into the downtown store's profit. At that time Powers ranked 7th among major retailers in the Minneapolis area, behind Dayton's, Target, Sears, Montgomery Ward, Donaldson's, and JCPenney.

The 7th Store in the Powers chain opened at Burnsville Center August 3, 1977 in Burnsville, Minnesota.

== Closure ==
In 1985, Powers was acquired from Associated Dry Goods by The L.S. Donaldson Company (also of Minneapolis, a unit of Allied Stores Corp.). This move converted and renamed all suburban Powers stores to Donaldson's; however the downtown Minneapolis store was instead sold to a real estate firm.

In 1987, after Campeau Corp.'s buy-out of Allied Stores Corp., Donaldson's was purchased by Carson Pirie Scott & Co. of Chicago, Illinois which in turn renamed all of the Donaldson's and former Powers stores with its own name.

In 1995 Carson's sold all of their Twin Cities area locations (formerly Powers/Donaldsons) to Dayton's parent Dayton Hudson Corp., which re-opened most of them under its moderate Mervyn's chain, mostly in a move to prevent serious competition in its Twin Cities stronghold. In 2004 when Dayton's successor Marshall Field's was acquired by May Department Stores, it also agreed to buy the former Donaldson/Powers locations operated by Mervyn's, and promptly shuttered them, selling the real-estate piecemeal.

== Stores ==
Some former Powers locations are still retail businesses today, and some have since been demolished. The store in the Highland Park neighborhood of Saint Paul, Minnesota, was converted to a Carson Pirie Scott store and ultimately razed in 1994. The St. Louis Park, Minnesota store in the Knollwood Plaza mall was razed and rebuilt, becoming a Kohl's store. Blaine, Minnesota's Northtown Mall location has seen many name changes, including a stint as a Herberger's Department Store. It later became a Becker Furniture Outlet and in early 2026 an Asian market. The Maplewood Mall store has also seen many name changes, and is currently Macy's. Eden Prairie Center's Powers location has had many name changes, but it is currently JCPenney listed on the 2020 store closing list. The Burnsville location has had many names, but is now split with Dick's Sporting Goods and Gordman's (closing 2020). The flagship store in downtown Minneapolis was demolished, and is currently the site of luxury apartments which opened in 2014.
