= Stewart's Department Store =

Regional department store chain based in Baltimore, Maryland

- Stewart's Department Store Building
- U.S. National Register of Historic Places
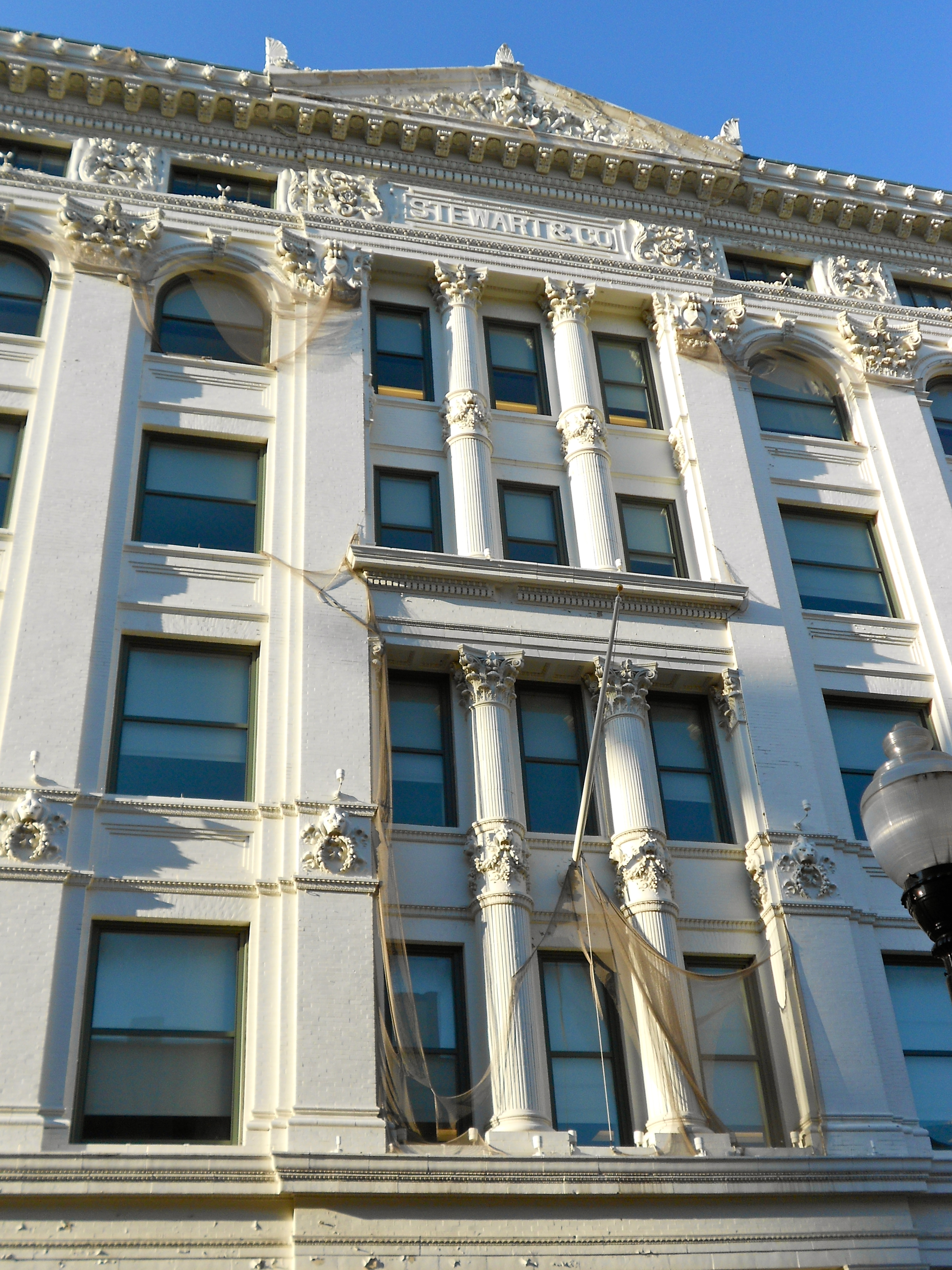
- Stewart's Department Store, March 2012

- Location within Baltimore Location within Maryland Location within the United States
- Location: 226-232 W. Lexington St., Baltimore, Maryland
- Coordinates: 39°17′31″N 76°37′10″W
- Area: less than one acre
- Built: 1899
- Architects: Cassell, Charles E.
- Architectural style: Renaissance
- NRHP reference No.: 99001078
- Added to NRHP: September 3, 1999

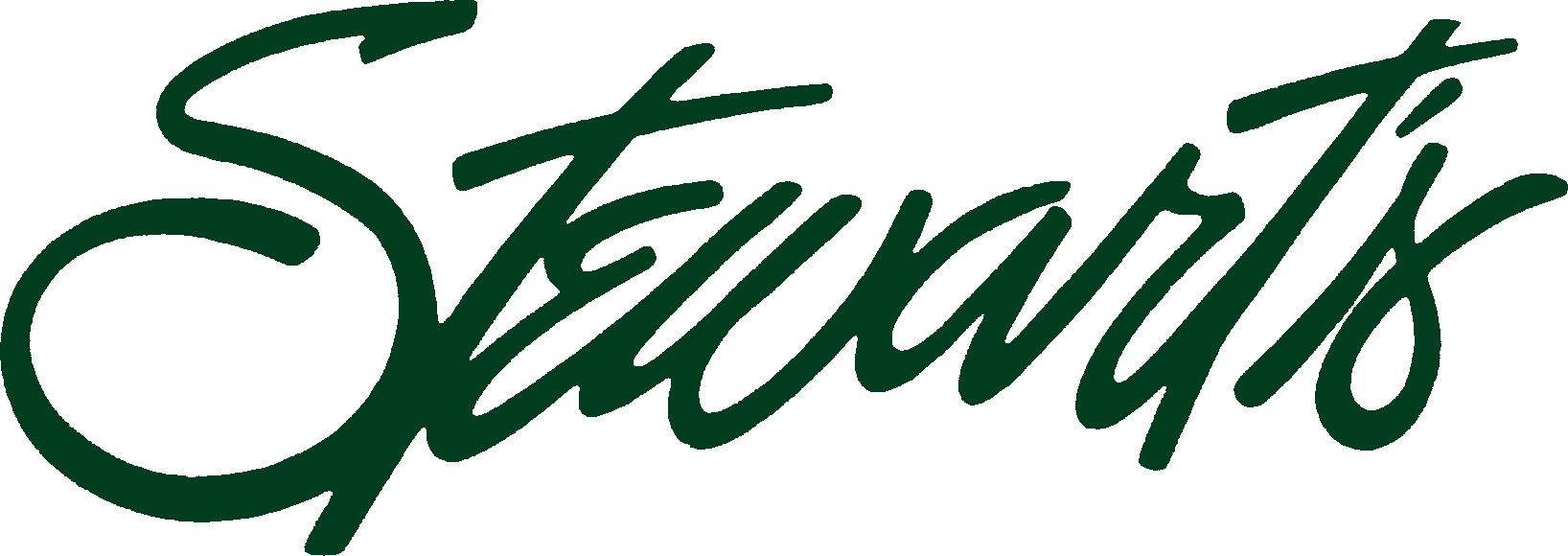
Stewart's logo

Stewart's Department Store, also known as the Posner Building, is a historic department store building located on Howard Street at Baltimore, Maryland, United States. Catholic Relief Services is currently headquartered there.

== Architecture ==
The Stewart's Department Store structure was designed in 1899 by Charles E. Cassell and is a six-story brick and terra cotta steel-framed building detailed in a highly ornate Italian Renaissance Revival style. It features exuberant ornamental detail includes fluted Ionic and Corinthian columns, lion heads, caryatids, wreaths, garlands, cartouches, and an elaborate bracketed cornice.

The Stewart's Department Store Building was listed on the National Register of Historic Places in 1999. The downtown flagship store was closed in 1978.

== History ==
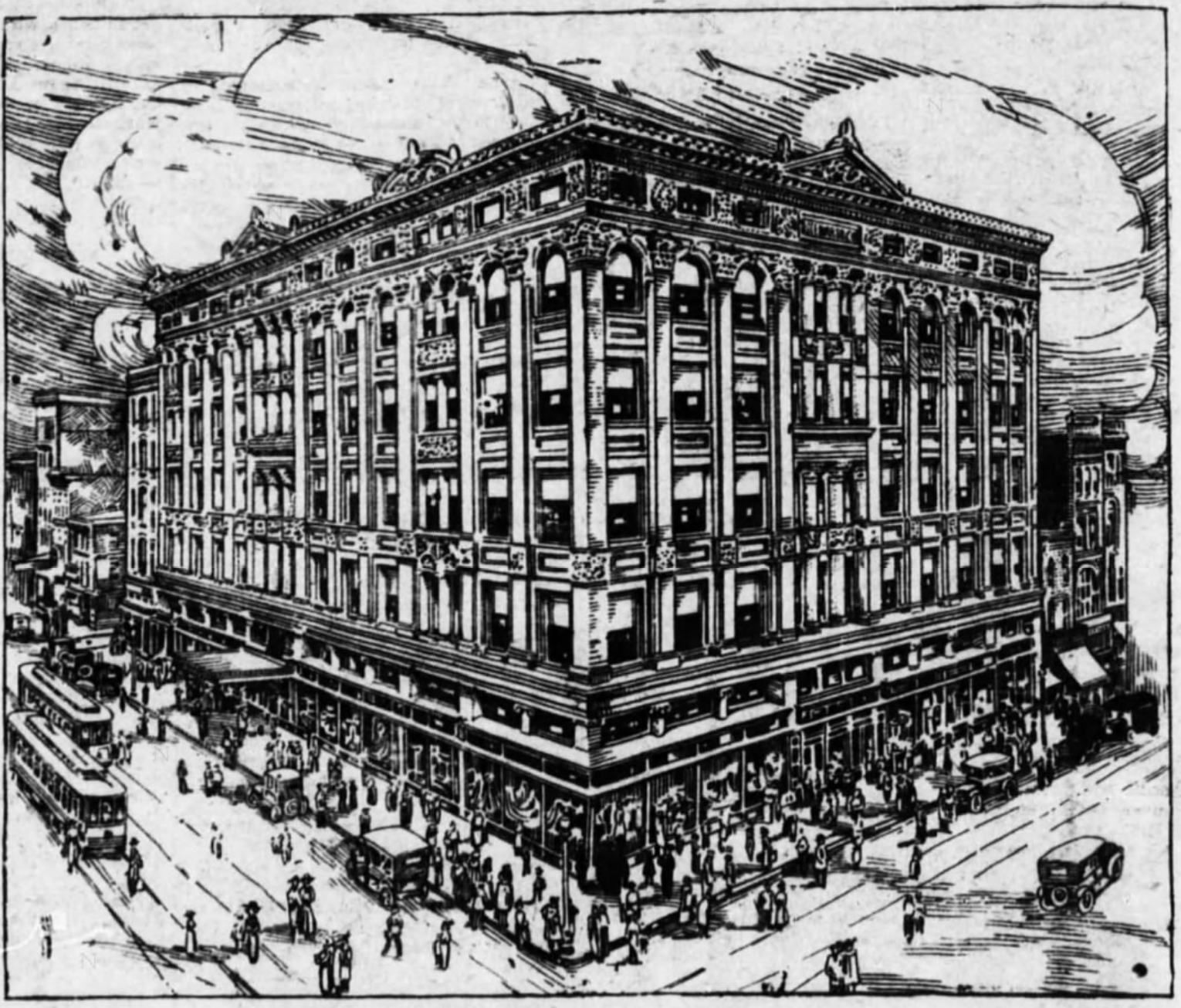
Sketch of Stewart & Co., 1922

Stewart's began in 1901 when Louis Stewart acquired the building of Posner's Department Store on the northeast corner of Howard and Lexington Streets. The chain was a founding member of Associated Dry Goods or ADG. While many of Baltimore's downtown department stores during the 19th and early 20th centuries were founded by German-Jewish immigrants, Stewart's was a non-Jewish owned department store, although the original founders Samuel and Elias Posner were Jewish.

Stewart's opened its first suburban store in 1953. The 110,000-square-foot (10,000 m^{2}) store on York Road was located near the city/county line. Built on two levels and surrounded by parking, the store was designed to “blend into the suburban area around it.” The design included broad expanses of glass from floor to ceiling, “screened by Fiberglas curtains containing 600 square yards of materials.” Elaborate murals of Homewood House, the Washington Monument and the Federal Hill skyline decorated walls in the store, and a restaurant with a Chesapeake Bay theme became a destination for northern shoppers.

Four other stores followed in the 1960s and 1970s. They included Reisterstown Road Plaza in 1962, Timonium Mall in 1969, Westview Shopping Center (an addition to a 1958 Mall) in 1969, and the store's final branch at Golden Ring Mall in Rosedale, Maryland, in 1974.

Suburban stores were converted to ADG's Caldor discount chain in 1983.
