= Hengerer's =

Former New York-based department store

William Hengerer & Company
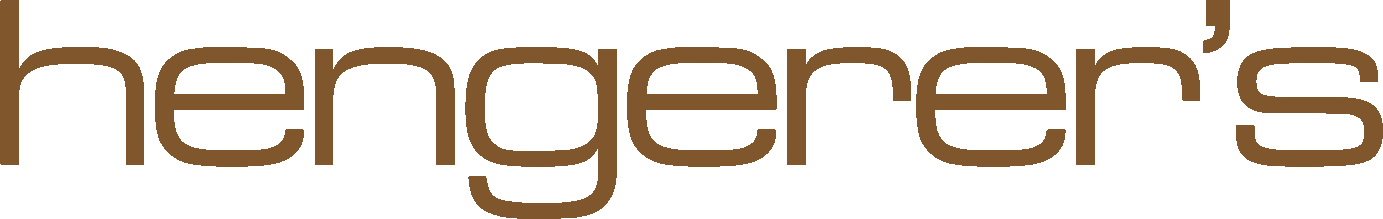

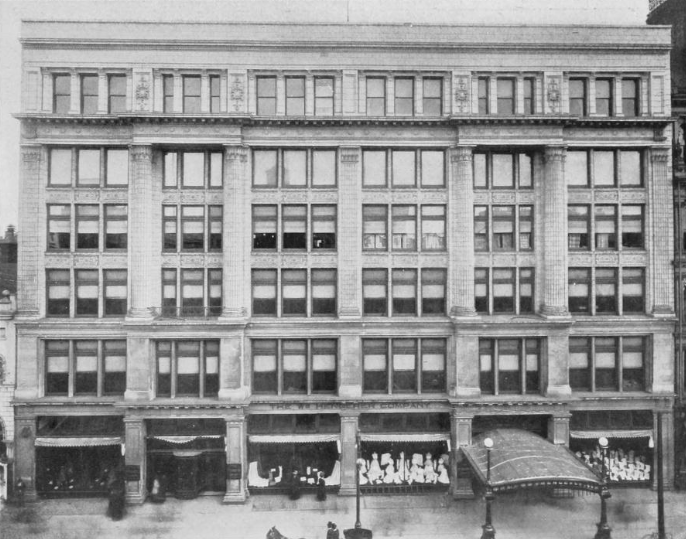
- Buffalo store, c. 1908
- Company type: Subsidiary
- Industry: Retail
- Founded: 1867; 159 years ago
- Defunct: 1987; 39 years ago
- Fate: Converted into Sibley's
- Successor: Sibley's (1987-1990); Kaufmann's(1990-2006); Macy’s (2006-Present)
- Headquarters: Buffalo, New York, United States
- Products: apparel, shoes, household,furnishings, and accessories
- Parent: Associated Dry Goods (1916-1986); The May Department Stores Company (1986-1987)
- Website: None

William Hengerer & Company, known informally as Hengerer's, was a Buffalo, New York-based department store chain, with stores exclusively located in the Western New York region until it was converted into Sibley’s in 1987.

== History ==
The company was founded in 1867 as J. C. Barnes & Co., followed by Barnes & Bancroft in 1869, at 259 Main Street, with James K. Bancroft. In 1873, William Hengerer was admitted as a partner and the company became known as Barnes, Bancroft & Co.

Along with other department stores located in Buffalo including AM&A's, Flint and Kent, and the Sweeney Company, Hengerer was very successful in the 1880s and 1890s. The department stores offered cooking classes, beauty parlors, and restaurants and introduced washing and sewing machines, vacuum cleaners, and iceboxes to the public.

In 1889, Hengerer's new department store was built at 268 Main Street and was designed by Cyrus K. Porter and built of brick with Medina sandstone trim. In 1903, a new store was constructed and by 1907, Hengerer's boasted of being the largest department store between New York City and Chicago.

Wm Hengerer Co. was a founding member of the Associated Dry Goods Corporation in 1916.

=== Closure ===
The Hengerer chain was merged into ADG's Sibley's name in 1981, with its flagship store at 465 Main Street in downtown Buffalo closing by 1987. The building was given several postmodern renovations and was renamed the Lafayette Court Building. Today, it is used as office and restaurant space.

== See also ==
- Associated Dry Goods Corporation

== Sources ==
- Rizzo, Michael F. (2007) Nine Nine Eight: The Glory Days of Buffalo Shopping Lulu Enterprises, Inc.; Morrisville, North Carolina. ISBN 978-1-4303-1386-1.
- Elvins, Sarah (2004). Sales & Celebrations: Retailing and Regional Identity in Western New York State, 1920-1940. ISBN 0-8214-1549-2.
