= The Diamond (department store) =

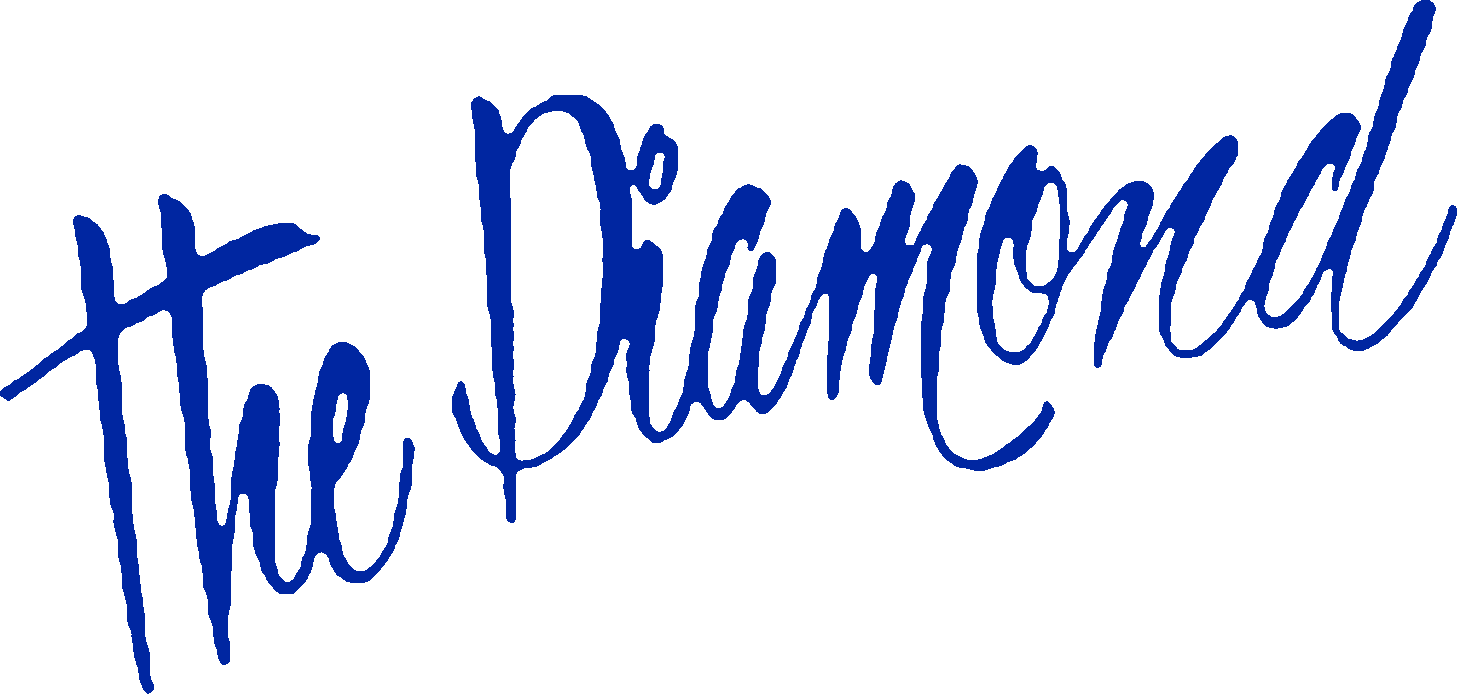
The Diamond logo

The Diamond began in 1906 as a small shoe store in Charleston, West Virginia, founded by Roane County native Wehrle B. Geary on the belief that "the recollection of quality remains long after price is forgotten". The shoe business prospered. It moved from its original location at 215 Capitol Street and was expanded to become the city's leading shopping center by 1920. Additional expansions followed.

In 1949, The Diamond completed a $1,250,000 (~$12.7 million in 2023) expansion and modernization project which included five elevators and a set of escalators that reached from the basement "Budget Store" to the fifth floor. The Diamond eventually became West Virginia's largest department store with 180,000 square feet (17,000 m^{2}) of space. The fifth-floor cafeteria was a destination for businessmen and shoppers alike.

The store was acquired by Associated Dry Goods in 1956. During the 1970s, Hickory Farms had a location in a portion of the basement of the store. The Diamond opened its one and only branch location at Grand Central Mall, Vienna, WV in 1972. Associated sold off the stores in 1983 because of limited expansion room.

Near the beginning of the 21st century, the state of West Virginia purchased the former department store and transformed it into state offices. The original facade of the downtown store (on the corner of Capitol and Washington Streets) remains largely unchanged.
