= Eden Prairie Center =

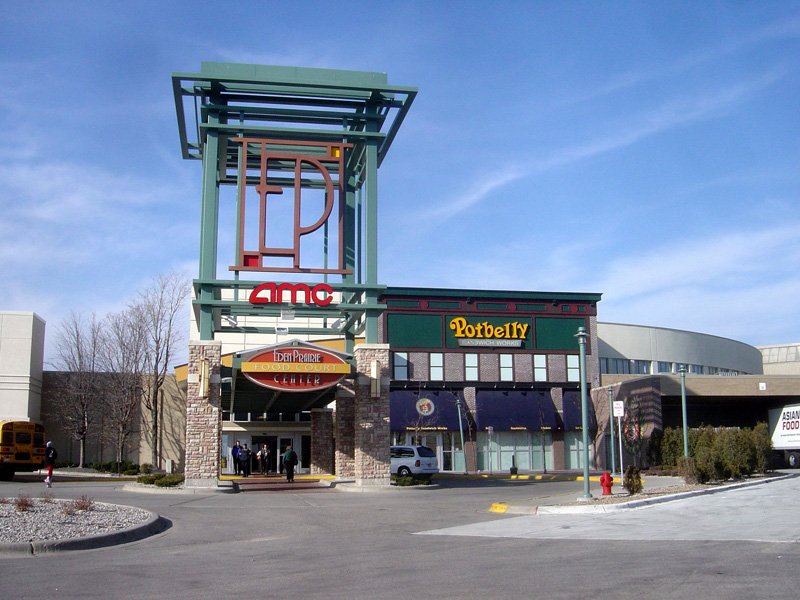
- Entrance to Food Court
- Location: Eden Prairie, Minnesota
- Coordinates: 44.8545935°N 93.425088°W
- Opened: 1976; 50 years ago
- Developer: Homart Development Company
- Owner: Jones Lang LaSalle
- Architect: North Architectonics
- Num. of stores: 90+
- Num. of anchor tenants: 5 (4 open, 1 coming soon)
- Floor area: 1,100,000 square feet (100,000 m^{2})
- Floors: 2 plus partial basement (1 in Target)

The Eden Prairie Center is a mall located in Eden Prairie, Minnesota. It has been managed by Jones Lang LaSalle as of 2020. It is anchored by Kohl's, Target, Von Maur and Scheels Sporting Goods.

== History ==
=== The 1970s and 1980s ===
The mall was developed by Homart Development Company and opened March 3, 1976. Originally, the mall featured wood-and-glass railings and an off-white and brown color scheme. Its pillars were clad in white pebbles. The building did not include an elevator; instead, a large ramp provided wheelchair access to the second floor. The mall also featured a sunken, basement-level food court. Department stores Powers Dry Goods and Sears were anchors. Powers' store became Donaldson's in 1985, then Carson Pirie Scott in 1987. On October 13, 1984, a Target store opened and was connected by a walkway that was adjacent to the mall.

=== The 1990s ===
The mall underwent a major renovation and the color scheme was changed to a pink and aqua pastel theme. The white pebble pillars were covered with pastel aqua round casings. The ramp was removed and replaced with a free standing elevator. The glass and wood railings were replaced with aqua painted metal. The food court was decorated with large neon palm trees and given a fountain that changed colors.

In preparation of a $60 million renovation plan in 1996, the mall worked hard to lure premiere Minneapolis retailer Dayton's; and it appeared to be a plan Dayton's was considering, though they eventually decided against it.

The Carson Pirie Scott store became a Mervyns, and work began on adding a Kohl's department store. A second United Artists movie theater was built, called "Eden Prairie East" and the old theater located beneath the Target walkway was renamed "Eden Prairie West". The mall entrances at this time had large white pyramids. In June 1997, General Growth purchased the rest of the development that it did not already own from Homart.

=== Present day ===
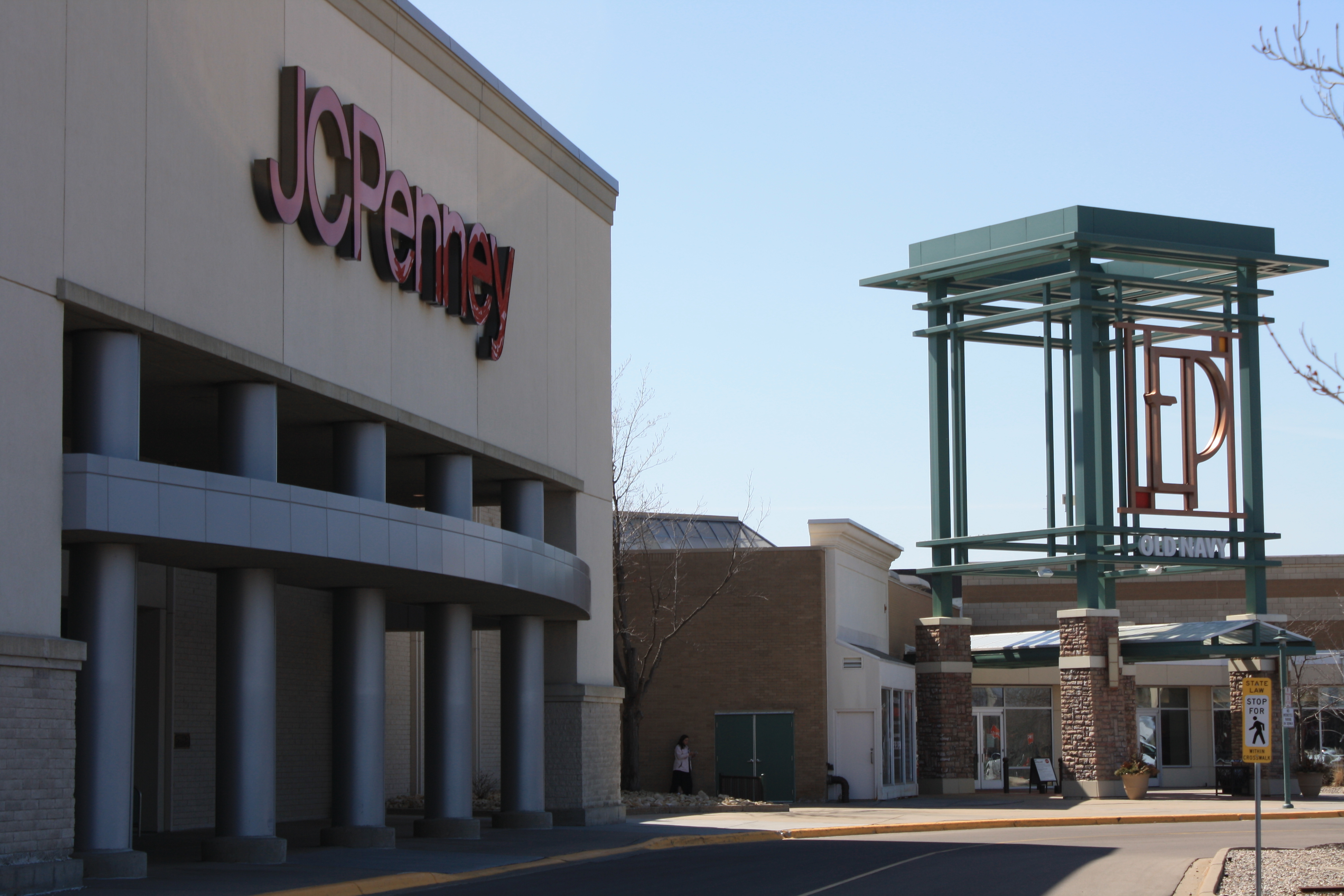
JCPenney was one of the anchor stores at Eden Prairie Center

The mall underwent the most major renovation in 2001. A new wing was added to the mall and the floor plan changed considerably to make the mall more modern and upscale. The food court was moved out of the recessed basement, which has been sealed in and now serves as the mall offices and other offices, changing the mall's store layout from a three-story mall to two stories. A large AMC movie theater was added to the mall and the two United Artists theatres have closed. The Target expanded into a Target Greatland and connected to the mall, replacing the old walkway. A Von Maur department store was added to the mall in August 2001, the mall entrance utilizing space that had been smaller mall stores near the old food court area. The mall has a simplified stylized "EP" logo to replace the older handwritten style logo, and the pastel theme disappeared in favor of wood and stonework. After the Mervyns store closed in August 2004, the owner of the mall acquired the store. Department Store Discounters had a brief stay in the Mervyn's location in 2005. JCPenney opened a new store in the former Mervyn's location in March 2007. In October 2013, General Growth Properties sold the mall to Cypress Equities for $99 million. Sears closed in 2016. 75% of the original building was demolished and a 248,000 sq/ft Scheels All Sports opened in July 2020. On June 4, 2020, it was announced that JCPenney would be closing as part of a plan to close 154 stores nationwide. However that store was later removed from the closing list. In June 2020 ownership was transferred to Eden Prairie Center, LLC- c/o Metlife Investment Mgmt. In April 2024, a transformer fire started in the aforementioned JCPenney which would cause the store to close temporarily. However, in August 2024, Mall management stated that the store would no longer re-open and stay permanently closed, ending the anchor's 17-year run at the mall.

In 2025, it was announced that the former JCPenney anchor building on the north wing of the mall would be redeveloped into a mixed-use development. The JCPenney building would be demolished to make way for apartments, retail, offices, and hotel on the mall grounds. The concept was presented to city officials in 2025 and the Minnesota Legislature approved of the project. A small provision in the state tax bill passed by the Minnesota Legislature it easier for city officials to provide tax-increment financing (TIF) for a mall project. The legislation would allow the city to establish a TIF district and provide financial assistance to the redevelopment project. As of 2026, the new mixed-use development is currently ongoing.

== Film appearances ==
- The Kevin Smith movie Mallrats was filmed inside the Eden Prairie Center Mall in 1995. Smith decided to film the movie at the mall (which in the movie, is referred to by its actual name, but is supposed to be located in New Jersey) after various malls (including the Monmouth Mall in Eatontown, New Jersey, and the now closed Bannister Mall in Kansas City, Missouri) objected to content in the film, and refused to allow the production to be shot there.
- The mockumentary Drop Dead Gorgeous has a scene filmed in the parking lot of the Eden Prairie Center, when they are allegedly parking in the parking lot of the nearby Mall of America; one of the 1990s era pyramid entrances is clearly visible in the background.
