= James N. Adam =

Scottish-American businessman (1842–1912)

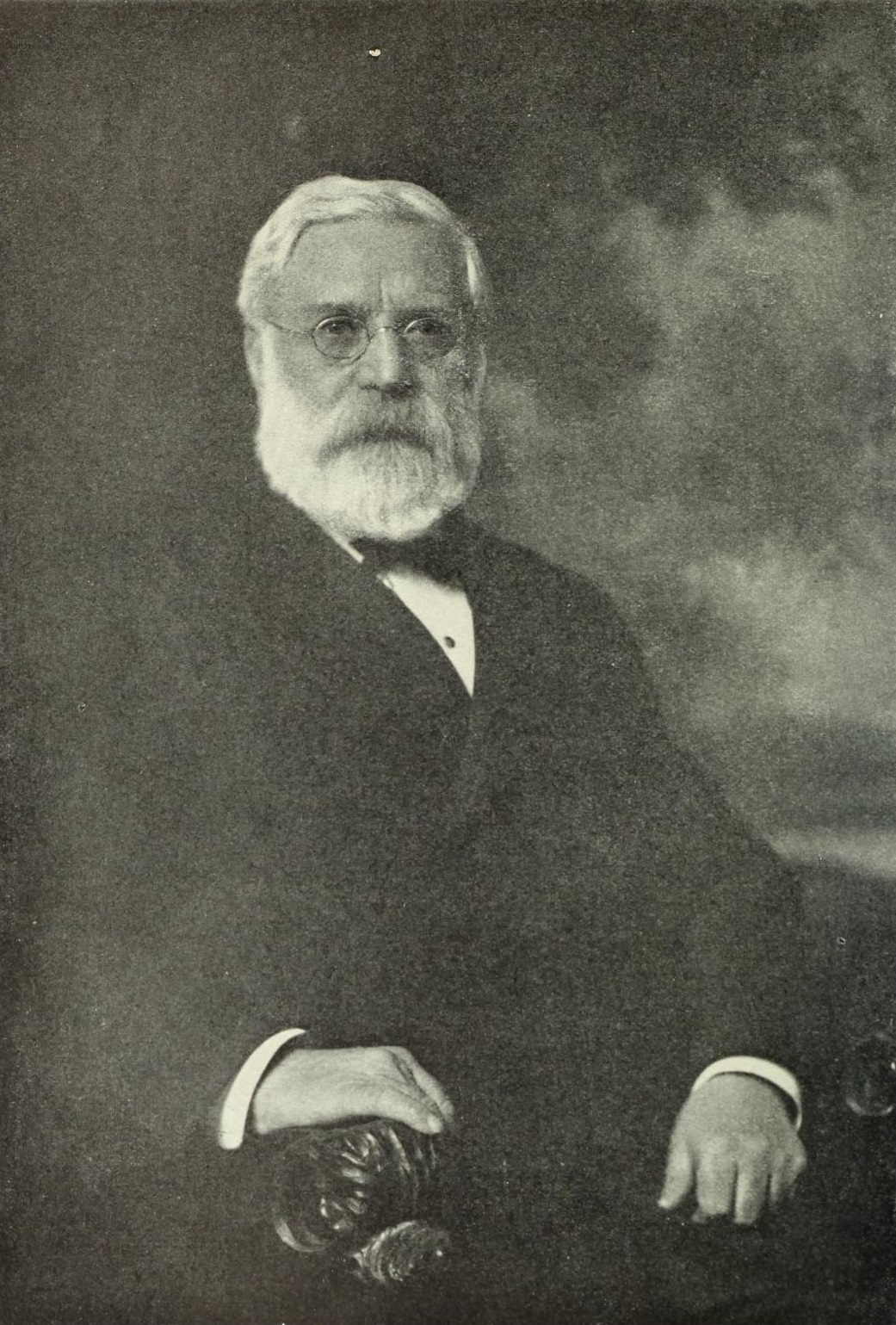

45th Mayor of Buffalo
- In office 1906–1909
- Preceded by: Erastus C. Knight
- Succeeded by: Louis P. Fuhrmann

Personal details
- Born: James Noble Adam; March 1, 1842 Peebles, Scotland
- Died: February 9, 1912 (aged 69) Buffalo, New York, US
- Resting place: St. Cuthbert's Cemetery, Edinburgh, Scotland
- Party: Democratic
- Spouse: Margaret Linton Paterson

James Noble Adam (March 1, 1842 – February 9, 1912) was a Scottish-American businessman and founder of the J. N. Adam & Co. as well as the 45th Mayor of Buffalo, New York, serving 1906–1909.

== Early life ==
Adam was born in Peebles, Scotland, on March 1, 1842, a son of Reverend Thomas Adam, a Presbyterian minister.

== Career ==
He began his business career in Scotland, where he lived until about 1872, when he moved to the United States upon the advice of his brother, Robert B. Adam, co-founder of Adam, Meldrum & Anderson. He initially settled at New Haven, Connecticut, where he began a successful retail operation. In 1881, he moved back to Buffalo and started a full-scale department store at Main and Eagle Streets, the J. N. Adam & Co. In 1905, he retired from the company.

He served as President of the Idlewood Association, a summer resort colony in Lake View, NY, during the 1880s and 1890s.

In 1901, he was elected alderman of the 24th ward. He was elected mayor on November 7, 1905, as the Democratic candidate, serving from 1906 until 1909. He did not run for another term.

== Personal life ==
On January 9, 1872, he married Margaret Linton Paterson of Edinburgh, she died in 1894. They did not have children.

He died at Buffalo on February 9, 1912, and was buried in St. Cuthbert's Cemetery in Edinburgh, Scotland, next to his wife.

=== Philanthropy ===
Some time between 1910 and 1915, he purchased almost 300 acres (1.2 km^{2}) of land adjacent to the village of Perrysburg, New York, using proceeds from his own personal fortune to establish a tuberculosis asylum. A hospital was opened known as the J. N. Adam Memorial Hospital for Tuberculosis; it later became the J. N. Adam State School for Severely Mentally Retarded.

Political offices
Preceded by Erastus C. Knight	Mayor of Buffalo, NY; 1906–1909	Succeeded by Louis P. Fuhrmann
