= Maplewood Mall =

Shopping mall in Minnesota, United States

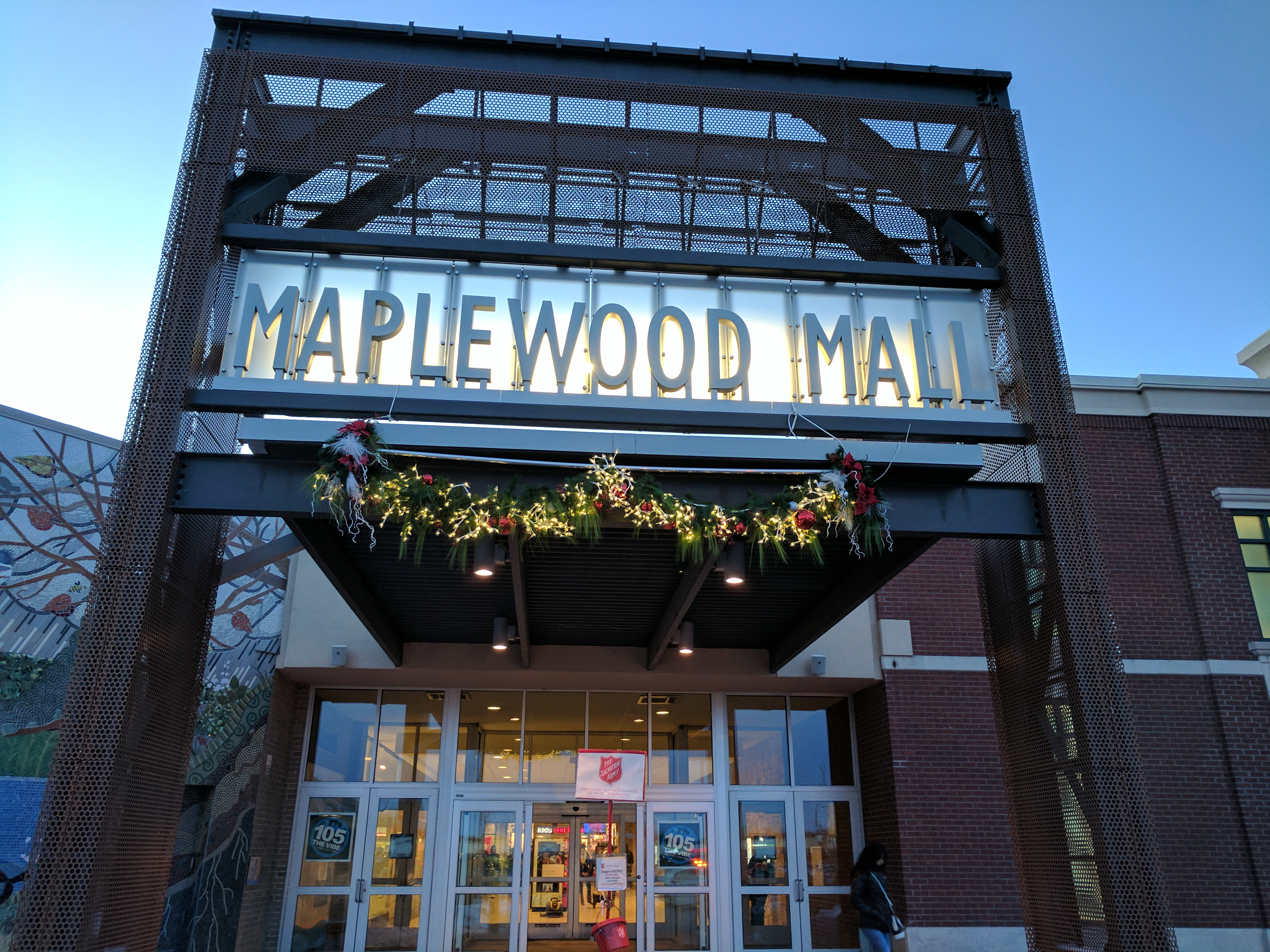
- Front entrance of Maplewood Mall in Minnesota
- Location: Maplewood, Minnesota, United States
- Coordinates: 45°01′55″N 93°01′18″W
- Address: 3001 White Bear Avenue North
- Opened: July 31st, 1974
- Developer: Homart Development Company
- Manager: Brookwood Capital Partners
- Owner: Brookwood Capital Partners
- Architect: North Architectonics
- Num. of stores: 103
- Num. of anchor tenants: 5
- Floor area: 931,000 square feet (86,500 m^{2})
- Floors: 2
- Public transit: Metro Transit
- Website: maplewoodmall.com

Maplewood Mall is a super-regional shopping mall in Maplewood, Minnesota, United States. It is near Interstate 694 on the Saint Paul side of the Twin Cities metropolitan area. Maplewood Mall opened on July 31st, 1974. It was later renovated and expanded in 1996. It is managed by Washington Prime Group of Columbus, Ohio. The mall's anchor stores are Barnes & Noble, JCPenney, Kohl's, Pan Asian Center North, and Pan Asian Center South.

In a 2008 study, it was named one of the top six malls in the metropolitan area in terms of visitors.

The mall was renovated in 2011 with updated entrances, new carpeting and tile, energy-efficient lighting, and updated restrooms. A Metro Transit hub opened near the mall in 2004 and features 425 park and ride stalls. The mall is open two hours earlier than the stores open to allow people to get exercise by walking in a temperature controlled environment.

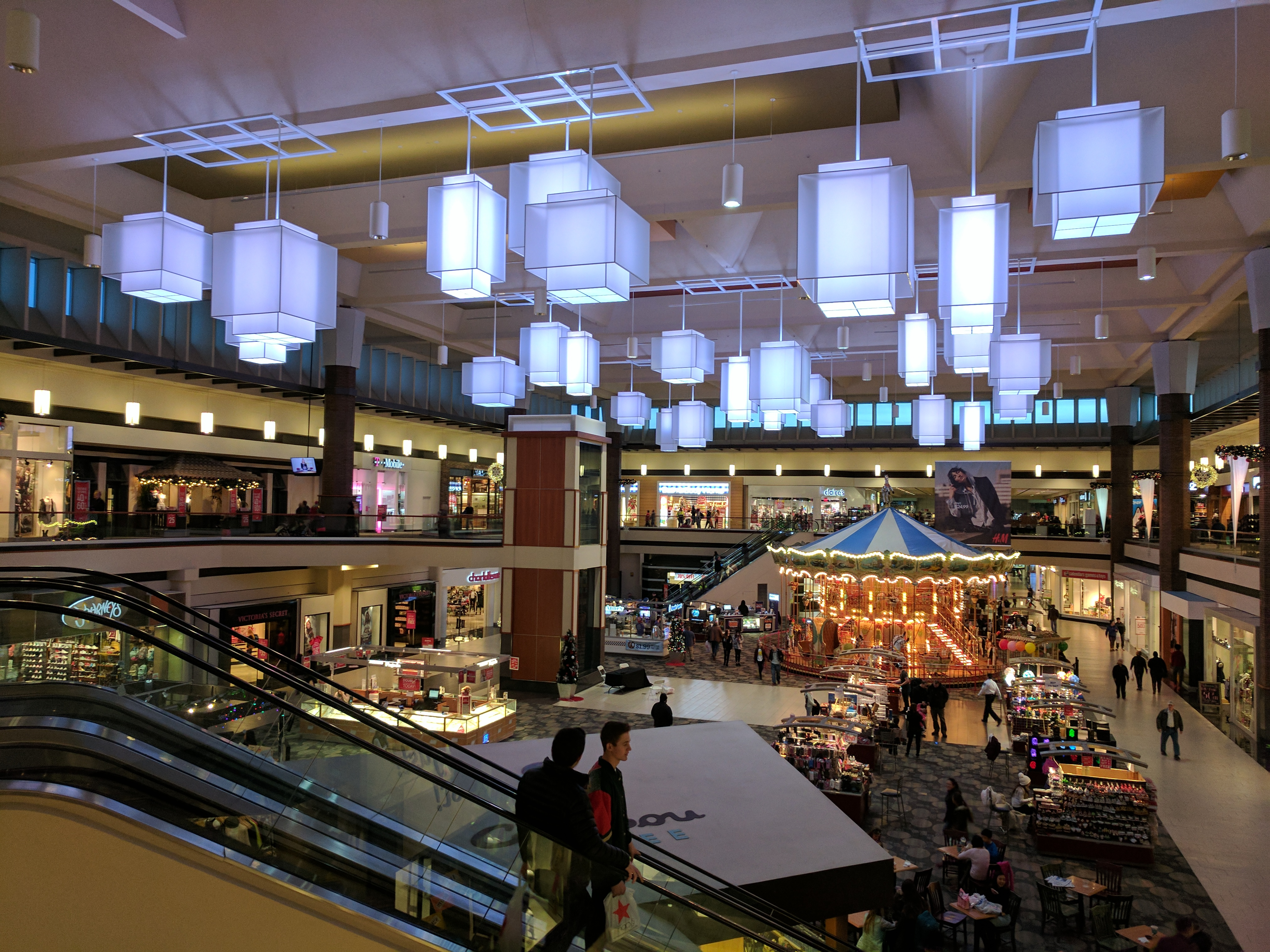
Interior of the Maplewood Mall

In 2015, Sears Holdings spun off 235 of its properties, including the Sears at Maplewood Mall, into Seritage Growth Properties. Sears closed this location in July 2018. Hmongtown Marketplace plans to open a second location in the former Sears space in 2025.

The state of Minnesota has plans for a new bus rapid transit (BRT) line named the "Rush Line" navigating from Downtown Saint Paul and past the Maplewood Mall to White Bear Lake.

== History ==
Maplewood Mall, developed by Homart Development Company, opened in 1974; anchored by Sears and Powers Dry Goods. There were approximately 120 stores in the mall at the time of the grand opening.

Local department store chain Donaldson's would purchase Powers in 1985 and convert all their stores to Donaldson's. Two years later, Carson Pirie Scott would do the same to Donaldson's, and rebrand all their stores as Carson Pirie Scott.

In 1988, MainStreet was added to the back of the mall; in March 1989, it would convert to Kohl's.

In 1996, a Mervyn's was added to the front of the mall; this anchor closed when Mervyn's left the Twin Cities market in 2004 and became a JCPenney shortly thereafter. That same year, Dayton's opened a store at the mall in October; it was the first Dayton's store in the Twin Cities to open since 1978. Dayton's opened in the former Carson Pirie Scott location (the sole Carson Pirie Scott location which was sold to Target that did not become a Mervyn's, as there was already a Mervyn's at Maplewood Mall). Dayton's underwent a change in name to Marshall Field's in 2001, and then Macy's in 2006.

In January 2025, Macy's announced that its store at Maplewood Mall would close in the first quarter of 2025. The store closed on March 23, 2025. The building was sold and will reopen in May 2025 as the Pan Asian Center, featuring Asian-themed stores, restaurants, offices and an event center. Pan Asian Center North opened in the former Macy's anchor space in July, 2025. Pan Asian Center then bought the former Sears anchor space and plans to reopen it as the Pan Asian Center South by 2027. It is currently under construction. Between the two buildings the Pan Asian Center will have 406,500 square feet of space and 24 acres of land.

On February 22, 2026, there was a shooting inside the mall, leaving one person injured. The mall was closed for the remainder of the day.
