= Robinson's of Florida =

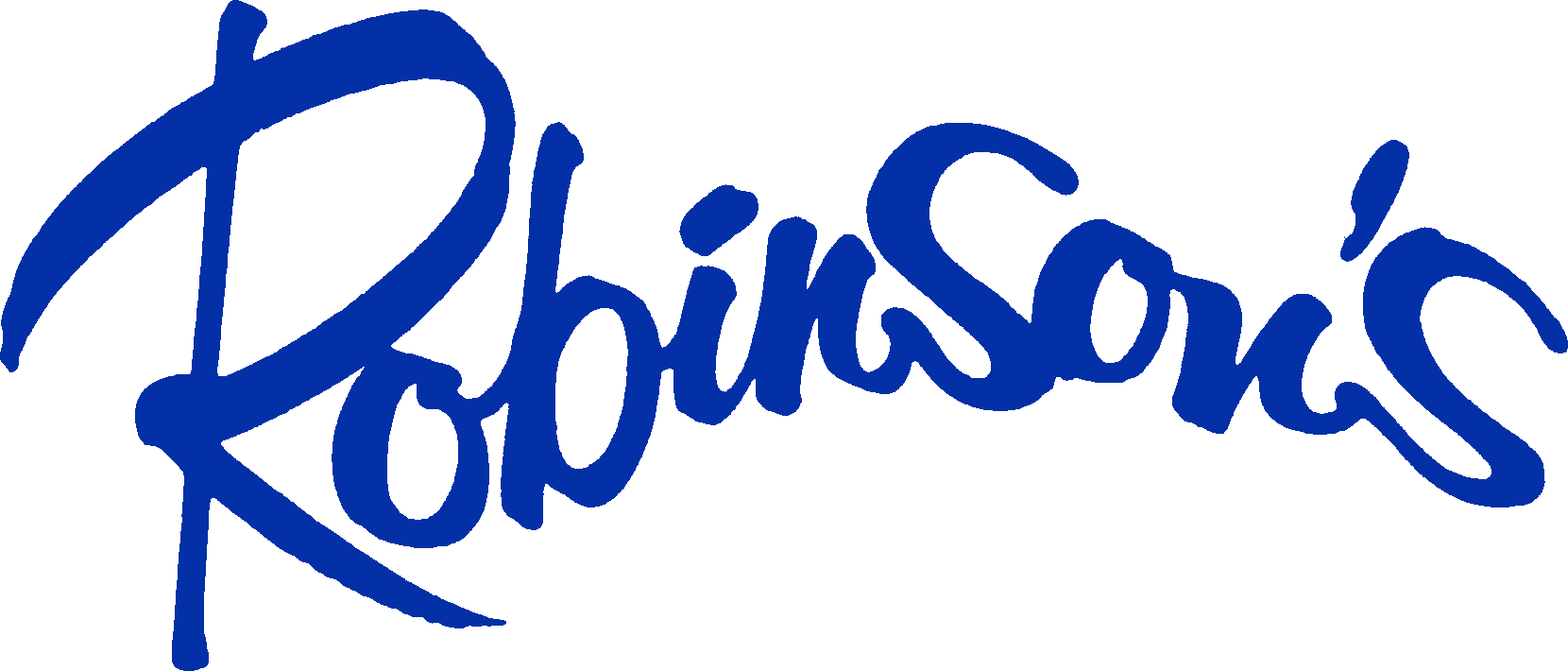
Robinson's logo

Robinson's of Florida was a chain of department stores on Florida's Gulf Coast and Orlando and based in St. Petersburg, Florida, starting with a store at Tyrone Square Mall in 1972. It had been founded in the 1970s as an attempt by Associated Dry Goods to emulate its upscale J. W. Robinson's stores of Southern California on the fast-growing Florida Gulf Coast. This newly created division grew to 10 locations. Rather than investing in the then-stagnant Florida market, May sold this division in 1987 to Baton Rouge based Maison Blanche. Seven of the former Robinson’s of Florida locations were subsequently sold by Maison Blanche to Dillard's* in 1991 while one was replaced and the other two became Gayfers** (which in turn was bought out by Dillard's in 1998) a year later because of Mercantile Stores.

== Former Robinson's of Florida Locations ==
City	Location	Opened	Status
Tampa	University Square*	1974	Relocated by Dillard's in 1995. Original spot is now a wing of shops.
Tampa	WestShore Plaza*	1974	Closed by Dillard's in 2001 (relocated to International Plaza and Bay Street). Building is now Sears. Closing in March 2019.
Sarasota	Southgate Plaza*	1978 (1961 as JCPenney)	Closed by JCPenney in 1977 and again by Dillard's in 2014. Building is mostly split into LA Fitness and Lucky's Market.
St. Petersburg	Tyrone Square Mall*	1973	Still operating as Dillard's.
Orlando	Orlando Fashion Square**	1973	Relocated by Maison Blanche in 1990. Original spot is now a wing of shops.
Orlando	The Florida Mall**	1986	Closed by Parisian in 2000 and again by Lord & Taylor in 2006. Location is now an outdoor shopping area.
Naples	Coastland Center*	1985	Rebuilt by Dillard's in 1995. Still operating as Dillard's.
Fort Myers	Edison Mall*	1985	Expanded and renovated by Dillard's in 1999. Still operating as Dillard's.
Clearwater	Countryside Mall*	1976	Remodeled by Dillard's in 2001. Still operating as Dillard's.
Altamonte Springs	Altamonte Mall**	1974	Still operating as Dillard's.
