= Vienna, West Virginia =

City in West Virginia, US

- City
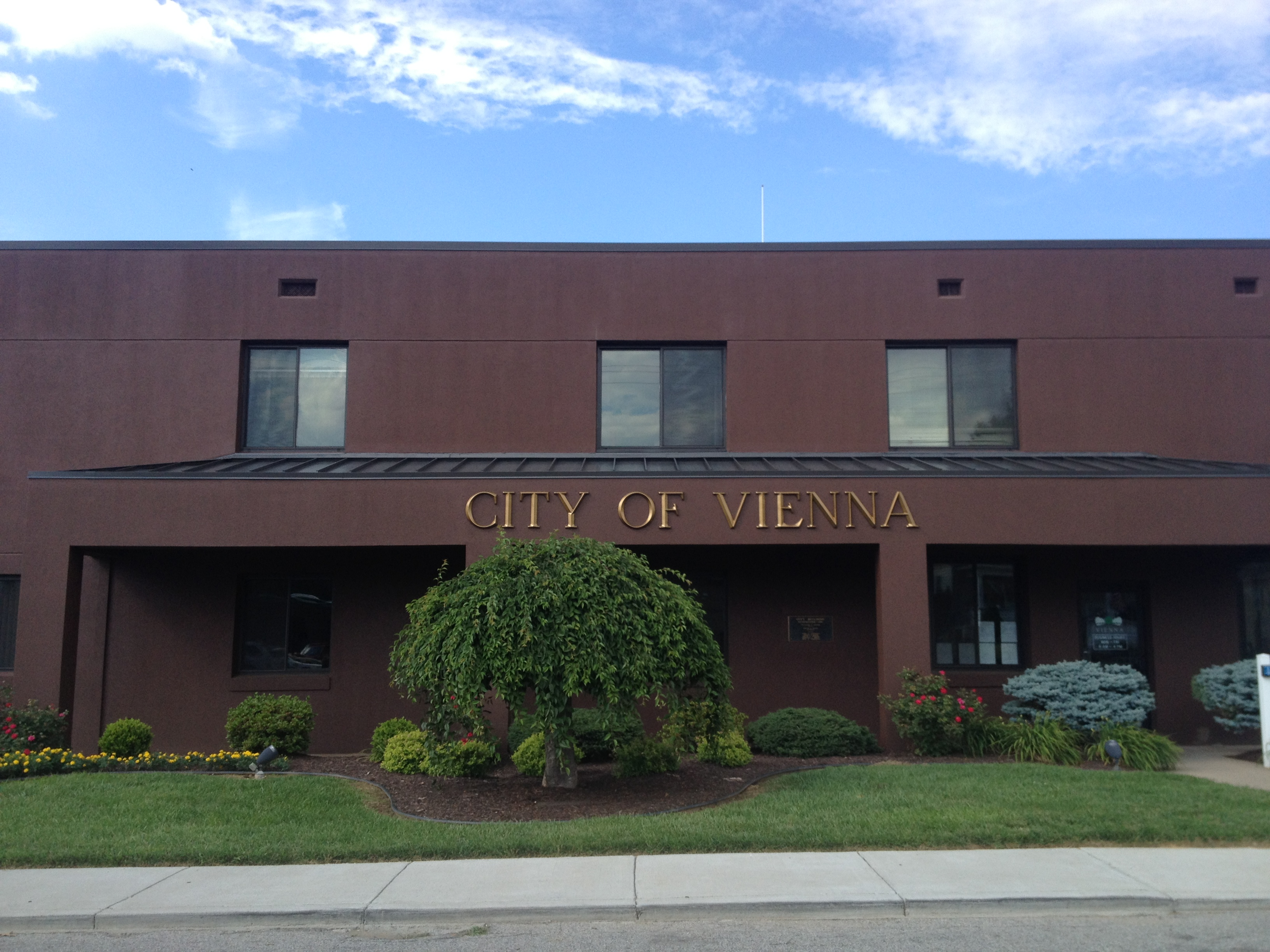
- City Hall

- Flag

- Location of Vienna in Wood County, West Virginia.
- Coordinates: 39°19′19″N 81°32′39″W
- Country: United States
- State: West Virginia
- County: Wood
- Laid out: 1794
- Incorporated: May 13, 1935

Area
  - Total: 3.97 sq mi (10.28 km^{2})
  - Land: 3.97 sq mi (10.28 km^{2})
  - Water: 0 sq mi (0.00 km^{2})
- Elevation: 646 ft (197 m)

Population (2020)
  - Total: 10,652
  - Estimate (2021): 10,576
  - Density: 2,551.6/sq mi (985.19/km^{2})
- Time zone: UTC-5 (Eastern (EST))
  - Summer (DST): UTC-4 (EDT)
- ZIP codes: 26101, 26105
- Area code: 304
- FIPS code: 54-83500
- GNIS feature ID: 2390663
- Website: Official website

Vienna (/viˈɛnə/ vee-EN-ə) is a city in Wood County, West Virginia, United States, situated along the Ohio River. The population was 10,676 at the 2020 census. It is the second-largest city in the Parkersburg–Vienna metropolitan area.

== History ==
In 1794, Joseph Spencer gave the city its name. Spencer served as an aide de camp to his father during the American Revolutionary War. It began as a 5,000-acre settlement, a grant to Spencer for his services during the war. Charles R. Blair was Vienna's first mayor after it was incorporated in 1935. Vienna was known for Vitrolite production until the 1940s.

In 2016, PFOA pollution was found in a stream in Vienna that originated in a DuPont chemical company landfill was the trigger for a landmark class-action lawsuit over PFOA contamination in the region.

== Geography ==
According to the United States Census Bureau, the city has a total area of 3.79 square miles (9.82 km^{2}), all land.

== Demographics ==
Historical population
Census	Pop.	Note	%±
1940	2,338		—
1950	6,020		157.5%
1960	9,381		55.8%
1970	11,549		23.1%
1980	11,618		0.6%
1990	10,862		−6.5%
2000	10,861		0.0%
2010	10,749		−1.0%
2020	10,652		−0.9%
2021 (est.)	10,576		−0.7%
U.S. Decennial Census

=== 2020 census ===
As of the 2020 census, Vienna had a population of 10,652. The median age was 44.9 years. 19.1% of residents were under the age of 18 and 23.3% of residents were 65 years of age or older. For every 100 females there were 91.7 males, and for every 100 females age 18 and over there were 90.0 males age 18 and over.

99.9% of residents lived in urban areas, while 0.1% lived in rural areas.

There were 4,798 households in Vienna, of which 24.8% had children under the age of 18 living in them. Of all households, 45.1% were married-couple households, 18.2% were households with a male householder and no spouse or partner present, and 29.9% were households with a female householder and no spouse or partner present. About 33.5% of all households were made up of individuals and 15.7% had someone living alone who was 65 years of age or older.

There were 5,188 housing units, of which 7.5% were vacant. The homeowner vacancy rate was 1.8% and the rental vacancy rate was 7.2%.

Racial composition as of the 2020 census
Race	Number	Percent
White	9,727	91.3%
Black or African American	130	1.2%
American Indian and Alaska Native	17	0.2%
Asian	209	2.0%
Native Hawaiian and Other Pacific Islander	2	0.0%
Some other race	39	0.4%
Two or more races	528	5.0%
Hispanic or Latino (of any race)	162	1.5%

=== 2010 census ===
At the 2010 census there were 10,749 people, 4,707 households, and 3,054 families living in the city. The population density was 2,836.1 inhabitants per square mile (1,095.0/km^{2}). There were 5,091 housing units at an average density of 1,343.3 per square mile (518.7/km^{2}). The racial makeup of the city was 95.9% White, 1.1% African American, 0.2% Native American, 1.4% Asian, 0.3% from other races, and 1.0% from two or more races. Hispanic or Latino of any race were 0.8%.

Of the 4,707 households 26.5% had children under the age of 18 living with them, 50.5% were married couples living together, 10.4% had a female householder with no husband present, 4.0% had a male householder with no wife present, and 35.1% were non-families. 30.4% of households were one person and 13.4% were one person aged 65 or older. The average household size was 2.24 and the average family size was 2.77.

The median age was 43.8 years. 20.2% of residents were under the age of 18; 8.1% were between the ages of 18 and 24; 23% were from 25 to 44; 29.1% were from 45 to 64; and 19.6% were 65 or older. The gender makeup of the city was 47.0% male and 53.0% female.

=== 2000 census ===
At the 2000 census there were 10,861 people, 4,733 households, and 3,152 families living in the city. The population density was 2,895.8 people per square mile (1,118.3/km^{2}). There were 5,074 housing units at an average density of 1,352.8 per square mile (522.4/km^{2}). The racial makeup of the city was 96.70% White, 0.95% African American, 0.17% Native American, 1.34% Asian, 0.02% Pacific Islander, 0.14% from other races, and 0.68% from two or more races. Hispanic or Latino of any race were 0.50%.

Of the 4,733 households 26.5% had children under the age of 18 living with them, 55.3% were married couples living together, 9.1% had a female householder with no husband present, and 33.4% were non-families. 30.3% of households were one person and 14.8% were one person aged 65 or older. The average household size was 2.29 and the average family size was 2.84.

The age distribution was 21.2% under the age of 18, 7.0% from 18 to 24, 25.3% from 25 to 44, 27.4% from 45 to 64, and 19.1% 65 or older. The median age was 43 years. For every 100 females, there were 87.9 males. For every 100 females age 18 and over, there were 83.5 males.

The median household income was $39,220 and the median family income was $49,477. Males had a median income of $41,779 versus $25,122 for females. The per capita income for the city was $24,452. About 5.3% of families and 7.7% of the population were below the poverty line, including 10.2% of those under age 18 and 7.6% of those age 65 or over.

== Parks and recreation ==
Vienna is a qualified Tree City USA as recognized by the National Arbor Day Foundation.

== See also ==
- Grand Central Mall
