= The May Department Stores Company =

American holding company of department stores

- Type: Public
- Industry: Retail
- Genre: Department stores
- Founded: 1877; 149 years ago in Leadville, Colorado, United States
- Founder: David May
- Defunct: August 30, 2005; 21 years ago
- Fate: Acquisition by Federated Department Stores
- Successor: Macy's Inc.
- Headquarters: St. Louis, Missouri, United States
- Area served: United States
- Products: Clothing; footwear; accessories; bedding; furniture; jewelry; beauty products; housewares

The May Department Stores Company was an American holding company of department stores founded in 1877 by David May. It operated several regional department stores throughout the United States, which were managed as distinct business divisions with limited interconnectivity between them. May was acquired by Federated Department Stores in 2005, and the remaining May-owned stores were converted to Macy's in 2006.

== History ==
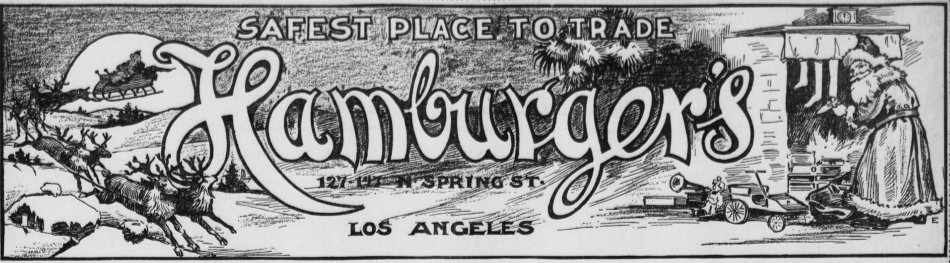
Christmas advertisement for Hamburger's Department Store, Los Angeles, 1905

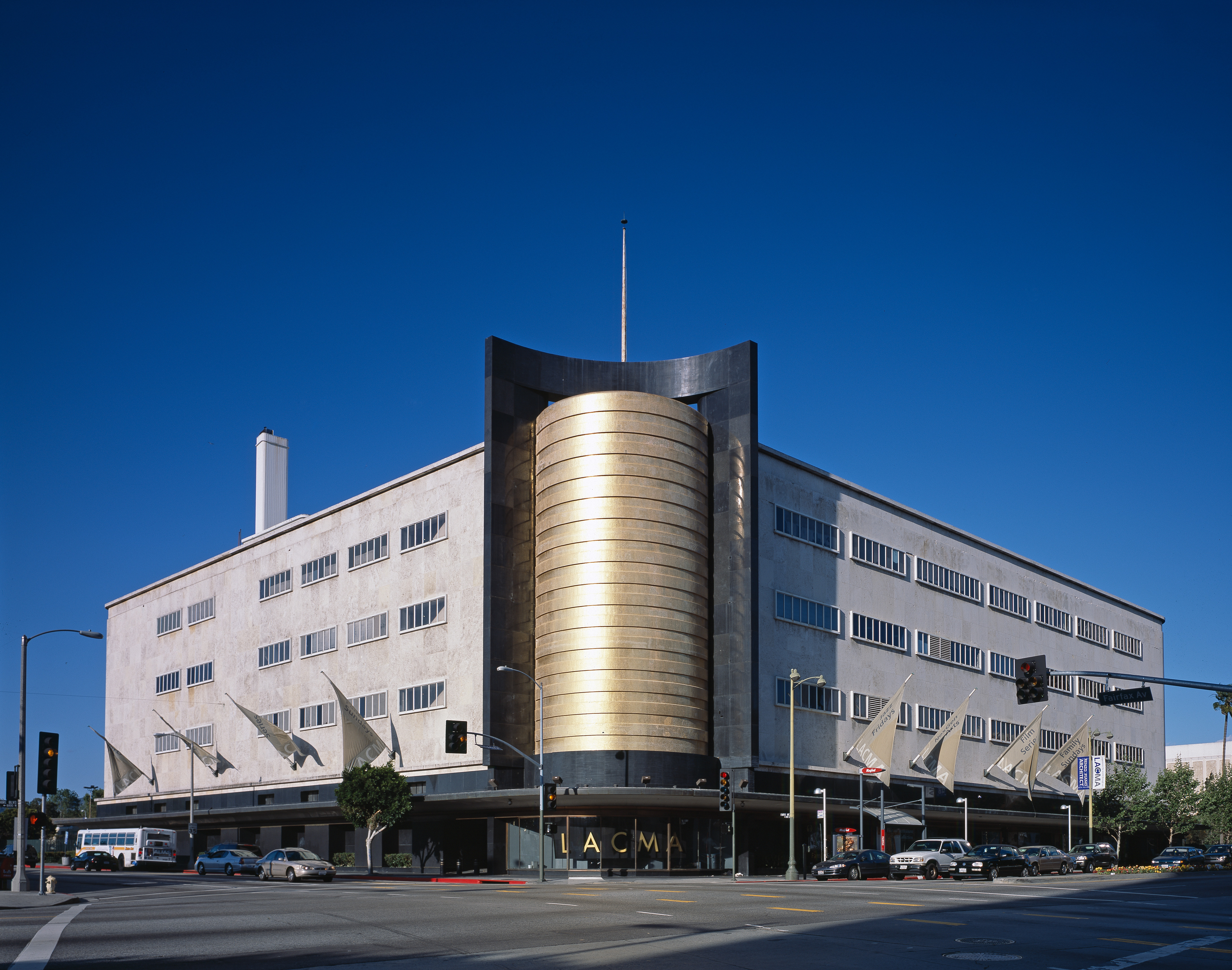
The 1939 Streamline Moderne style May Company Wilshire building in Los Angeles. It was later adapted for use as The Academy Museum of Motion Pictures

In 1877, the May Department Stores Company was founded in Leadville during the Colorado silver rush. In 1889, the headquarters moved to Denver. In 1899, May acquired the E. R. Hull & Dutton Co. of Cleveland, renaming it the May Company, Cleveland, later named the May Company Ohio.

In 1905, the headquarters moved to St. Louis. In 1910, the business was officially incorporated as the May Department Stores Company. In 1911, The Famous Clothing Store (owned by May) and the William Barr Dry Goods Company merged to create Famous-Barr. In 1912, May acquired the M. O'Neil Co. (O'Neil's) department store of Akron, Ohio. In 1923, May acquired A. Hamburger & Sons Co. in Los Angeles and renamed it May Company California. In 1946, May acquired the Kaufmann's chain based in Pittsburgh, retaining it as a separate division. In 1947, May acquires Strouss-Hirshberg Co. based in Youngstown, Ohio, retaining it as a separate division and changing the name to Strouss.

In 1956, May acquired the Daniels & Fisher Company of Denver, merging it with May stores in the area to create a new May-Daniels & Fisher division. In 1958, May acquired the Cohen Brothers Department Store in Jacksonville, Florida, turning it into the May Cohens chain. In 1959, May acquired the Hecht Company of Baltimore, adding it as a new division. In 1965, May acquired G. Fox & Co. of Hartford, Connecticut. In 1966, May acquired the Meier & Frank chain based in Portland, Oregon, adding it as a new division. David's grandson Morton May became the chairman in 1951 and headed the company for 16 years. Morton May was active in St. Louis civic affairs and was a patron of the St. Louis Art Museum. In 1968, Venture Stores was founded when Target co-founder John F. Geisse went to work for May Department Stores. Under an antitrust settlement reached with the Department of Justice, May was unable to acquire any more retail chains at the time, and the department store company needed a way to compete against the emerging discount store chains.

In August 1978, May sold the 70-store Consumers chain of catalogue merchants to the Canadian Consumers Distributing. It closed its stores in 1996.

In 1986, May acquired the Associated Dry Goods holding company and its chains (including J. W. Robinson's and its Florida division, Loehmann's, Lord & Taylor, Caldor, Joseph Horne Company, The Denver Dry Goods Company, Goldwater's, Hahne and Company, L. S. Ayres, H. & S. Pogue Company, Stewart Dry Goods, and Sibley's), the largest-ever retail acquisition in history at that time. In 1987, May renamed the five-unit May-Cohens as May Florida and sold the ten stores from Robinson’s of Florida to Maison Blanche so as to give them a foothold in the Floridan market. Stores at Tyrone Square, Orlando Fashion Square, WestShore Plaza, Altamonte Mall, University Square Mall, Countryside Mall, Southgate Plaza, Edison Mall, Coastland Center, and The Florida Mall were included in the deal along with a proposed 11th store at Lakeland Square Mall. May acquired Foley's in Houston and Filene's in Boston from Federated Department Stores whereas May Florida was also acquired by Maison Blanche. As a result, May withdrew from Florida by closing the Gateway location and converting those at Roosevelt Square, Regency Square, Volusia Mall, and Orange Park Mall under the Maison Blanche nameplate.

In 1993, May Company California and J.W. Robinson's merged to form Robinsons-May. In that same year, Filene's absorbed the G. Fox division, Kaufmann's absorbed the May Company Ohio division, and Foley's absorbed the May D&F division. In 1995, May acquired the John Wanamaker chain based in Philadelphia. In 1996, May acquires the Strawbridge's chain based in Philadelphia. In 1998, May acquired The Jones Store chain based in Kansas City, Missouri. In 1999, May acquired Zions Cooperative Mercantile Institution based in Salt Lake City, folding it into the Meier & Frank subsidiary.

In 2000, May Department Stores purchased David's Bridal. In 2001, Meier & Frank absorbed the ZCMI name, entering the Utah marketplace. In that same year, Hecht's acquired five Proffitt's stores in Nashville TN, entering the Nashville marketplace. In 2002, Meier & Frank operations consolidated with the Robinsons-May division while Kaufmann's operations consolidated with the Filene's division, yet both retaining the Meier & Frank and Kaufmann's names. In 2004, May Department Stores took over the Marshall Field's chain from Target Corporation.

== Acquisition of May by Federated ==
On February 28, 2005, Federated Department Stores, Inc., announced that they would acquire the May company for $11 billion (~$17.4 billion in 2025) in stock. To help finance the May Company deal, Federated agreed to sell its combined proprietary credit card business to Citigroup. The merger was completed on August 30, 2005 after an assurance agreement was reached with the State Attorneys General of New York, California, Massachusetts, Maryland and Pennsylvania.

By September 2006, all of the May regional nameplates, except for the Lord & Taylor chain, ceased to exist as Federated consolidated its operations under the Macy's mastheads including the most famous store names Marshall Field's, Filene's, and Kaufmann's, as well as the last nameplate to still have the May name (Robinsons-May). All locations that were not sold off were rebranded as Macy's, except for one Hecht's location in Friendship Heights. That was rebuilt and rebranded as Bloomingdale's. In advance of the retail consolidation, May's credit call center in Lorain, Ohio, ceased operations on July 1, 2006. Lord & Taylor, the lone department store division not to be largely converted to the Macy's nameplate, was sold to a group of investors at NRDC Equity Partners, LLC for $1.2 billion (~$1.84 billion in 2025) in October 2006. David's Bridal and After Hours Formalwear were sold in November 2006.

== Logos ==
1962-1993

1993-2002

2002-2005

== May Centers ==
Around the beginning of the twentieth century, the May Department Stores Company created a real estate division that handled the purchase of land and the construction of the buildings that would house their new stand-alone department stores. Starting in 1947, when they wanted to open a new store for their May Company California division, May entered the new open-air shopping center development business with the construction of what would later become the Baldwin Hills Crenshaw Plaza in Los Angeles. After that time, May became a major shopping center and later mall developer when they began to develop new malls to house their newly proposed department stores.

During the mid-1980s, the company noticed that their stock was vastly undervalued and therefore was at risk of becoming a hostile takeover target. May Department Stores needed to re-purchase some of its company's stock to increase the share price. To accomplish this, they needed to obtain cash quickly, which they did by making a deal with Prudential Insurance in which the insurance company gave May $550 million in exchange for 50% ownership of May Centers. In 1992, Prudential purchased the rest of May Centers and renamed the company CenterMark.
