= H. & S. Pogue Company =

American department store chain

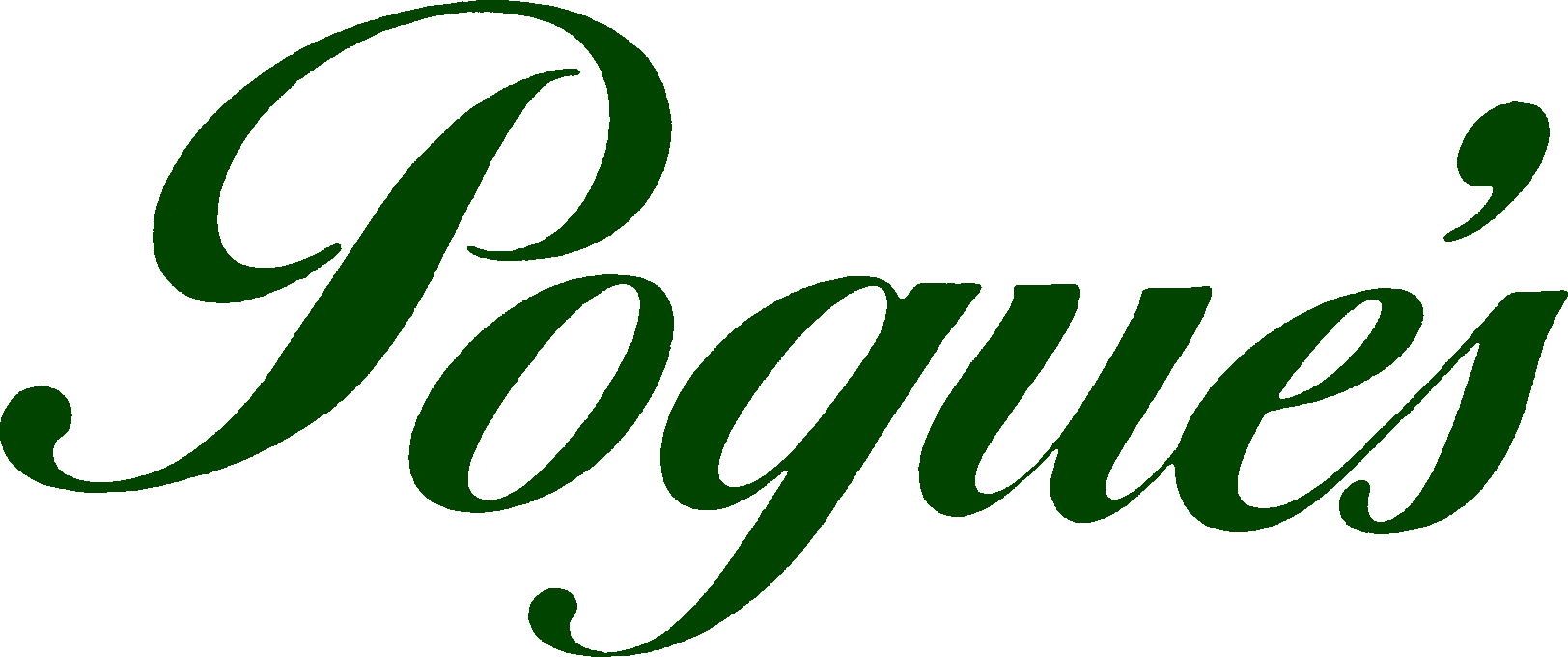
Pogue's final logo

The H. & S. Pogue Company, also known as Pogue's, was a Cincinnati, Ohio–based department store chain founded by two brothers, Henry and Samuel Pogue. Founded in 1863, it became one of the most prominent department store chains in the region, until it was sold in 1961 to Associated Dry Goods.

== Origins ==
Henry Pogue emigrated from Cavan, Ireland, to Cincinnati in 1851, and worked as a clerk in a dry goods store. In 1863, he became head of Pogue & Jones dry goods store on West Fifth Street. Henry and his brother Samuel went on to buy out their uncle John Crawford's company, and renamed it H. & S. Pogue Dry Goods Company. Three other brothers subsequently joined their enterprise.

== Growing with the Queen City ==
The original storefront on West Fifth Street led to the Pogue brothers contracting to have their own store built on more fashionable West Fourth Street between Race and Vine Streets directly across from Enin, McAlpin & Company, a location they would maintain throughout the company's history. The modest 31' storefront grew quickly, soon expanding into the buildings adjacent on each side. Renowned architect Samuel Hannaford was chosen to design the company's flagship store in 1916, expanding the enterprise westward to the corner of Race Street, the result being a graceful Edwardian structure with an impressive six acres of selling space spread over seven floors. Publicity drawings were made of a completed store with the three original storefronts demolished and replaced with a never-to-occur expansion of the Hannaford-designed structure.

The downtown store would be expanded again, despite the Great Depression, in 1930 when an alley was removed to provide a nine-story mechanical and ventilation tower that included ten service and passenger elevators connecting the building's 11 floors of two basements, six above-ground selling floors, and three service/storage levels. The structure also served to functionally connect the store northward into the arcade of the new Carew Tower, where Pogue's would occupy the southern side, the northern side and five floors above it being occupied by long-time competitor Mabley & Carew.

In 1948, the 12-story, 110,000 square foot, Service Building would be constructed a block south of the store at the corner of Third and Race Streets, housing the growing business's clothing alterations, carpet, drapery, millinery (Pogue's creations regularly come up for sale on eBay), and upholstery workrooms; the print shop; fur storage; engraving and silver polishing; and watch repair. The fur and garment storage was noted as Cincinnati's largest, with over 20,000 garments in storage. Sensitive to the building's location on a prominent street in the heart of the financial district, the firm selected respected Cincinnati architect Henry Hake to craft a handsome brick tower similar in design to the striking modernist Terrace Plaza Hotel three blocks north of it and completed the same year. Hake and Son's other notable Cincinnati commissions included the Cincinnati Reds' Crosley Field, the Queen City Club, and the headquarters for the Western and Southern Life Insurance Company. A three-story warehouse, primarily for furniture and appliances, was maintained at Sixth and Cutter Streets in an area of the downtown Cincinnati street grid that would vanish with the construction of Interstate 75.

Suburban expansion came in April 1959 with the opening of a 60,000 square foot boutique-style branch at Kenwood Plaza and construction underway of a 160,000 square foot full-scale branch store at Tri-County Center. As the decade drew to its close, Pogue's was firmly established as the region's finest department store, and second-largest after the John Shillito Company. However, it was already apparent that the changes reshaping post-war America, with shoppers steadily moving to the suburbs and preferring automobiles rather than public transportation, were leading to the end of the single-location department store in an urban center. Further suburban expansion and a downtown garage were critical to the business's success, and expensive.

The decision was made in 1961 to sell the business to Associated Dry Goods, an affiliation of upscale department stores founded in 1911 by several New York City-area retailers headed by Lord & Taylor. Other divisions at the time of the Pogue's sale included Hahne & Company (Newark NJ), J.W. Robinson (Los Angeles), The Diamond (Charleston WV), William Hengerer Company (Buffalo), and Sibley, Lindsey & Curr (Rochester). Locally, Shillito's had been a unit of Federated Department Stores, forerunner of today's Macy's, since the 1930s, and, in 1960, long-time competitor Mabley & Carew had sold out to Allied Stores, then one of the nation's largest department store chains with well-known divisions including Stern Brothers (New York City), Jordan Marsh (Boston) and Miller & Rhoads (Richmond), and, regionally, the William Block Company (Indianapolis), Polsky's (Akron), and The Fashion (Columbus). Allied also owned the three-location Rollman & Sons stores in Cincinnati at the time of the Mabley & Carew purchase, but would operate the two chains independently for two years before merging them into the Rollman locations but under the Mabley & Carew nameplate.

At the time of the sale to Associated Dry Goods, the H&S Pogue Company employed approximately 1,500 persons (an additional 700 were hired seasonally each Christmas) and the layout of the store was as follows:

- Sub-Basement: Delivery Wrapping, Employee Locker Rooms.
- Basement: Budget Store - Women's Accessories, Clothing, Coats, Hosiery, Lingerie, Millinery, and Sportswear; Infants; Children's Clothing; and Men's Furnishings.
- Main Floor: Candy, Clocks, Epicure, Fine Silver, Florist, Hosiery, Gifts, Gloves, Jewelry, Leather Goods, Men's Furnishings, Notions, Service Desk (Information and Cashiers), Stationary, Tobacconist, Toilet Goods (Cosmetics), Umbrellas, Watches, Women's Budget Blouses and Millinery, Women's Shoes.
- 2nd Floor: Children's Clothing and Shoes, Domestics, Gift Wrap, Infants/Layette, Laces and Trimmings, Linens, Men's Coats and Suits, Men's Shoes, Men's Restroom, Patterns, Portrait Studio, Ribbons, Yard Goods (Fabrics).
- 3rd Floor: Bridal Salon, Fashion Office (Special Events, Cincy-Hi and Collegiate Fashion Boards), Fur Salon, Juniors, Lingerie, Maternity Shop, Millinery, Robes, Rose Room Restaurant, Wedding Consultant, Women's Clothing and Sportswear, Women's Restroom.
- 4th Floor: Art Needlework, Better Homes & Gardens Home Planning Center, Bridal Registry, China and Crystal, Draperies, Glassware, Lamps, Rugs, Toys.
- 5th Floor: Auditing, Bedding, Books and Rental Library, Furniture, Interior Design Studio, Luggage, Pictures and Mirrors.
- 6th Floor: Accounting, Adjustments, Appliances, Buying Offices, Cashiers, Check Cashing, Customer Lounge, Executive Offices, Housewares, Jane Alden (Mail and Telephone Order Service), Paints, Records, Travel Bureau, Unfinished Furniture, Will Call, Women's Rest Room.
- 7th Floor: Advertising, Beauty Salon, Credit Union, Employee Cafeteria, First Aid, Maintenance, Operations, Personnel, Sales Promotions, Security, Staff Training.
- 8th Floor: Receiving and Marking.
- 9th Floor: Competitive Shoppers, Sign Shop, Visual Merchandising

== Associated Dry Goods: Expansion then decline ==
Change came quickly after the sale to Associated Dry Goods in 1962. The downtown store was expanded that year into the first two floors of the former Mabley & Carew space in the Carew Tower Arcade, as Mabley's relocated to the former Rollman & Sons flagship across Fifth Street. A Cincinnati tradition was born in July 1964 when a bridge across the second level of the arcade was constructed to connect the two Pogue spaces, with the Ice Cream Bridge featuring local favorite Graeter's Ice Creams.

An parking garage with space for 1,600 cars (it would remain Cincinnati's largest privately owned garage until its demolition in 2017) was constructed across Race Street with a covered walkway into the store's second floor. Each level of the garage was named after a flavor of ice cream available on the Ice Cream Bridge. The street and second floors of the downtown store were redecorated in a contemporary French Provincial style by the architectural firm of Raymond Loewy Associates.

A new restaurant, the Camargo Room, was added on the store's sixth floor in time for the 1964 Christmas Season, replacing the more traditional Rose Room on the third floor. It was noted that cigarette smoking by women was welcome. A Camargo Restaurant was later added to the Tri-County store.

Kenwood Plaza would be expanded in 1965-66 to nearly 200,000 square feet with a second floor that allowed the addition of men's and children's departments, a Camargo Restaurant, home store, and beauty salon. Kenwood Plaza would remain the largest and most successful Pogue's branch store through the chain's existence, and by 1983 was surpassing the downtown store in annual sales.

Efforts to update the Pogue image were made in 1970 when suburban expansion continued with a 153,000 square foot three-level store in Northgate Mall.

In 1972, the components of Pogue's end-game would start to take shape when ADG purchased L.S. Ayres (13 stores) and Stewart Dry Goods (seven stores) based in nearby Indianapolis and Louisville, respectively. Unlike the other ADG regional "carriage trade" chains, L.S. Ayres and Stewart's were the mid-market, dominant department stores in their marketplaces, more similar to Shillito's in Cincinnati. ADG now had a 25-store cluster of stores across the Indiana, Ohio, and Kentucky tristate, and cost synergies between the three, while operating independently, began to be implemented. Efforts to update the brand were evident in the 1972 holiday catalogue, which featured a caftan-clad woman strumming a guitar rather than Pogue's traditional Christmas-themed illustrated covers.

As shoppers continued to migrate to the suburbs, the 1970s also saw the closure of the downtown store's basement sales level, which became the new Merchandise Receiving facility. Following an ADG corporate mandate to better reach younger customers, Juniors was moved to the Main Floor, and many departments were discontinued including Appliances, Books, Draperies, the Home Planning Center, Paints, Records, and Toys. The Service Building was closed with the surviving workrooms incorporated into the newly-vacant downtown store space or outsourced. The Camargo Room service was modified from a quick-service set menu to full service, with a self-service Soup & Salad Bar opened in the adjacent former Customer Lounge. Full menu service was also added to the Ice Cream Bridge, renamed the Bridge Restaurant.

The final Pogue's branch store would open in 1976, a 112,000 square foot location in Florence Mall, the chain's only venture into Kentucky and the only one without a furniture department or restaurant. As ADG continued to attempt to update its Pogue's unit in the late 1970s, Tri-County's Ice Cream Parlor would be moved into the store and reformatted to the Le Petite Café format which had proven so successful in the Downtown store.

== Merger and closure ==
As the Ohio Valley suffered in the recession of the early 1980s, Pogue's profits declined. The downtown store, in particular, had seen sales declines since 1983 when a Saks Fifth Avenue opened directly across Race Street. Saks' demands that Pogue's reduce their Race Street loading docks dramatically hurt the viability of the downtown store which had served as the receiving and distribution center for all five stores. A new standalone facility in northern Kentucky added to the expenses of the H.& S. Pogue Company division, and in 1983 Pogue's was merged into their Indianapolis ADG sister division L.S. Ayres & Company in a successful effort to keep both divisions profitable. ADG's annual report to its shareholders would note that the first full year of the merger saw sales increase 22%, and profits nearly 50%, at the five Cincinnati-area stores, with market share being moved from all three major competitors (by then Elder-Beerman, McAlpin’s, and ShillitoRikes). The merger had been anticipated by ADG senior management for several years, with the Pogue's and L.S. Ayres logos each being modified for consistency between both chains, and Pogue's merchandise assortment being down-scaled throughout the early 1980s to the more mid-market range of L.S. Ayres.
