= Caldor =

Discount department store chain of US discount department stores

Caldor Inc.
- Type: Public
- Traded as: NYSE: CLD
- Founded: 1951
- Founders: Carl and Dorothy Bennett
- Defunct: May 15, 1999
- Fate: Chapter 7 Bankruptcy Liquidation
- Headquarters: Norwalk, Connecticut, U.S.
- Number of locations: 145 (1998)
- Area served: Northeastern United States
- Number of employees: 22,000 (1998)
- Parent: Independent (1951–1981, 1991–1999); Associated Dry Goods/May Department Stores (1981–1990)

Caldor, Inc. was an American discount department store chain founded in 1951 by husband and wife Carl and Dorothy Bennett, sometimes referred to as "the Bloomingdale's of discounting". Caldor grew from a second story "Walk-Up-&-Save" operation in Port Chester, New York into a regional retailing giant. Its stores were earning over $1 billion (~$2.47 billion in 2024) in sales by the time that Carl Bennett retired in 1985, by which time Caldor was a subsidiary of Associated Dry Goods.

Despite its successes, Caldor suffered from financial issues by the 1990s. The company was liquidated and all 145 stores were closed by May 1999.

== History ==
=== Early history ===
In 1951, while shopping at an E. J. Korvette store in New York City, newlyweds Carl and Dorothy Bennett were inspired to open their own discount store that would be different from the average postwar discount retailer. They envisioned a business that would emphasize quality of merchandise over less desirable, lower cost wares at prices 10 to 40 percent below the manufacturers' suggested list prices, along with department store level services such as well informed salespeople, merchandise guarantees, and a liberal refund policy. These turned into cornerstones of the sustained growth and success of the chain they went on to establish.

Later in 1951 the couple used their $8,000 savings (equivalent to $99,231 in 2025) to open a 9,600-square-foot store in a second floor loft in Port Chester, New York. They named it Caldor, a blending of their first names. Specializing in name-brand hard goods such as appliances, electronics, home furnishings, jewelry, and sports equipment for middle to upper middle class income yet bargain-conscious consumers. Their slogan, "Where Shopping Is Always a Pleasure", was more of a way of life for the Caldor team. Carl Bennett, who had been working as a wholesale liquor salesman for a Connecticut company, was born and raised in retail. His father owned a small grocery store in Greenwich, Connecticut, where quality of merchandise and customer appreciation were key. Bennett credits his father for teaching him the retail sensibilities that he used to guide his company throughout the years.

=== Initial expansion ===
With business growing steadily, the original store was replaced in 1953 with an expanded location in Port Chester, New York, that also provided more modern amenities. A second Caldor was added in 1958, a 70,000-square-foot store in Norwalk, Connecticut. This year also marked Caldor's introduction of apparel to its product line.

In 1961, with four locations, Caldor Inc. went public with Carl Bennett serving as president, director, and chairman of the board, and Dorothy as treasurer and director. Carl's brother Harry Bennett served as vice president. That same year fire destroyed the Norwalk store and all of its contents. Ever resourceful, Caldor continued to serve the Norwalk community by operating out of three temporary stores close to the damaged outlet, which was quickly being rebuilt. Despite this setback that destroyed nearly seven months of inventory, the company posted an increase in sales of approximately 43% over the previous year.

Part of Caldor's financial performance was attributed to its negotiations with vendors over payment terms. The company reportedly secured agreements form many suppliers based on a "2% 10/net 30–60" structure, under which Caldor received 2% discount if payment was made within 10 days, or otherwise paid the full amount within 30 to 60 days. This arrangement reduced procurement costs and contributed to the company's ability to offer competitive pricing. It has been suggested that these practices also supported Caldor's rapid expansion, although further clarification and sourcing are needed.

=== Accelerated growth ===
By 1963, Caldor had stores in Peekskill, NY, Danbury, CT, Hamden, CT, Norwalk, CT, and Riverside, CT, in addition to the original location in Port Chester, NY. Staying true to its belief in the benefits of regionalization each new store was planned close to Caldor's headquarters. In November of that year Caldor's common stock, which had split two for one in September, began trading on the American Stock Exchange.

In 1966, Caldor opened its ninth store. Its management, sales, and executive board were also expanded in size and depth. A report written that same year by The Value Line Investment Survey, one of Wall Street's most influential investment advisory services, recognized Caldor as a company growing at a rate of advance faster than that of Xerox Corporation.

During the remainder of the 1960s and the 1970s, the economy saw years of booming consumer consumption, as well as contraction and recession. Throughout these changing times and varied economic climates Caldor continued to show healthy profits and expansion. Many Caldor competitors, such as E. J. Korvette, Grand Way Stores, Two Guys, and W. T. Grant, did not fare as well and would shut down. In 1976, Caldor took over seven stores formerly operated by the defunct W. T. Grant, giving Caldor immediate access to locations that were already zoned for retail outlets and access to fast-tracked expansion. According to Bennett, those stores became "immediately profitable" for Caldor.

=== Estate of Thornton v. Caldor, Inc. ===
Caldor was the subject of a lawsuit filed by former employee Donald Thornton, who claimed he was fired by the company for refusing to work on Sunday, which was his Sabbath day. Thornton contended that by forcing him to work one Sunday a month, Caldor was violating a Connecticut state law that permitted him to observe his Sabbath without opposition from his employer. Caldor contended that the law was unconstitutional as it violated the Establishment Clause of the First Amendment to the United States Constitution. The lawsuit was filed in 1980, and eventually the case was heard before the United States Supreme Court, wherein Caldor's position was upheld.

=== Purchase by Associated Dry Goods ===
Longest used iteration of the "rainbow" logo, in use from 1974 to 1982

In 1981, Associated Dry Goods (ADG), the owners of Lord & Taylor and other quality department stores, purchased Caldor, Inc. for $313 million (~$911 million in 2024). Attracted to its growth potential and low debt, the 63-store Caldor chain was ADG's first entry into the realm of discount retailing. Bennett was retained under a three-year contract, and ADG brought on several other Caldor executives.

=== Carl Bennett's retirement ===
In March 1984, Carl Bennett announced that he would retire on May 31, 1985, after 33 years with the company. At the time of this announcement, Caldor had 100 stores and over $1 billion in sales. After his three-year contract with Associated Dry Goods expired, Bennett looked forward to retirement and spending time relaxing, playing tennis, reading a few new books, and vacationing. ADG wanted Bennett to stay as long as possible. "After all", said one corporate insider, "Carl Bennett is Caldor". Bennett died on December 23, 2021, aged 101.

=== Sale and filing for bankruptcy ===
In 1989, May Department Stores (which was Associated Dry Goods' successor upon merging with May in 1986) announced it would sell Caldor to a group that included Odyssey Partners and Donaldson, Lufkin & Jenrette. As the 1990s emerged, Caldor would run into troubles. In 1995, Caldor filed for Chapter 11 bankruptcy protection. The chain found itself unable to compete with the lower prices and wider selection of such stores as Wal-Mart (which had acquired several former Caldor stores), causing a dramatic loss in sales. Caldor also had trouble meeting its financial goals, and losses mounted. Shortly before filing for bankruptcy, Caldor had $1.2 billion in assets and $883 million in liabilities, the lowest amount of assets and the highest amount of liabilities the company had had since it was sold. In 1996, Caldor closed 12 underperforming stores due to the bankruptcy. In 1997, Caldor closed two underperforming stores in New York City.

=== 1998 weekly ad printing error ===
Like all department and discount stores, Caldor relied on its weekly multi-color circular in Sunday newspapers to advertise its Sunday–Saturday sales for the week, along with an annual catalog-like "Toy Book" which featured its toy selection for the holiday season. In November 1998, the company suffered a public relations embarrassment when the 1998 Toy Book featured a prominent photograph of two grinning boys playing the board game Scrabble, with the word "rape" spelled out in the center of the board, buried amongst nonsense words. 11 million copies of the flyer were distributed to the public via an 85-newspaper distribution chain. Caldor released a statement expressing its mystification over how the image was created and got past proofreaders, and issued an apology about the oversight.

=== Final liquidation ===
In January 1998, Caldor had $1.2 billion in liabilities and $949 million in assets, one of the worst deficits the company ever had. Sales for financial year 1997 were $2.496 billion (around $4.95 billion as of June 2025), down from 1995 peak of $2.765 billion (around $5.85 billion as of June 2025); losses shrunk from $301 million in 1995 to less than half of that, that is, $132 million in 1997. A few months later, Caldor closed another 12 stores, mostly in the Washington, D.C., area. This, along with the chain's slow financial progress, caused its secured creditors to file a motion that would have forced Caldor to convert its bankruptcy, from which the company had still not emerged, from a Chapter 11 filing to a Chapter 7 filing; this would have required Caldor to liquidate all of its stores and cease operations. The creditors believed their best option was for Caldor to liquidate rather than continue to operate. In addition, Caldor's stock was delisted on the New York Stock Exchange in September 1997.

Caldor responded by seeking mediation to resolve the dispute, but in January 1999 the company deduced that there was nothing they could do to save themselves. On January 9, Caldor announced it would not place any more orders for, nor would they accept shipments of, new merchandise for their stores. Thirteen days later, on January 22, Caldor's chairman announced the company had no alternative but to wind down business and lay off all of their staff at the corporate headquarters in Connecticut. One day after that, on January 23, 1999, liquidation sales began at the remaining 145 stores. By April 1999, most of the Caldor locations had sold off all their merchandise and closed their doors; the last store to close did so on May 15, 1999. At the time of the liquidation, Caldor employed over 24,000 people.

Many Caldor stores eventually were purchased by retailers such as competitors Kmart, Target, and Walmart, and many metro New York Caldor stores were bought by Kohl's as part of Kohl's entry into the New York retail market.

== Slogans ==
- You'll Never Not Find It At Caldor (1980s)
- Where Shopping Is Always A Pleasure (1980s)
- Bring Home The Difference. (mid-late 1990s)
- Check Out The Change (late 1990s)

== Caldor distinctives ==
Caldor was successful through several business practices which were distinct in their industry.

=== Innovations ===
- Unlike similar retailers of the day, there were no leased departments in any of the Caldor stores, allowing managers the flexibility to rearrange a floor plan to suit the season or sales patterns. This allowed, for example, more space for outdoor goods during the summer and a larger toy department for Christmas.
- Caldor's early and successful adoption of computerization of inventory, cost, and marketing control made it a model in the retail field. “Buyers, every Monday morning, have on their desks reports on the merchandise that was sold in their departments as of the previous Saturday night,” reported Bennett. Indicative of the interest created by Caldor's computer programs was a visit by a group of Australian retailers who traveled in the late 1960s to the company's headquarters to observe their computer operations, which also handled the Caldor payroll.

=== Merchandise ===
- Caldor continually carried quality national brands, offered at discount prices that appealed to many who would normally be shopping in higher end department stores. Walter F. Loeb, a vice president and retailing analyst at Morgan Stanley is quoted in a 1980 New York Times article as saying, "The company is, in my opinion, one of the really excellent upscale discounters that has an appeal not only to the budget-minded blue-collar worker but to the middle-class white-collar shopper, too."
- Caldor never stocked closeouts or irregulars. Their credo, "the best available merchandise at the lowest possible price", remained true throughout their history.

=== Regionalism ===
New stores were located within at most a day's travel from Caldor's corporate headquarters and its distribution center, allowing for closely controlled costs and minimized inventory expenses. This allowed single advertising and promotional campaigns to cover multiple stores and simplified executive supervision and transfer of employees.

=== Store environment ===
The interior of each Caldor store was designed to look more like a department store than a discounter, and many were even designed by the same firms used by more up-scale retail environments. They featured wide aisles, bright lighting, and large, colorful display treatment, and were typically remodeled every six years.

=== Training programs ===
- Early on, Bennett understood the importance of knowledgeable salesclerks and their impact on purchases, customer satisfaction, and reducing the number of refunds or exchanges. He instituted routine training sessions not only for sales staff, but for department managers, and traveling supervisors, as well. This extensive and ongoing program taught customer service practices and included merchandise shows that previewed new lines to be added to the stores.
- Caldor also offered an Executive Development Program, with topics ranging from best management practices to retail operations and customer service. As part of these seminars, top-level executives and buyers also served in sales positions to better understand day-to-day store operations and customer response to merchandise, presentation, and service.

== Awards ==
In September 1980, Carl Bennett was named “Discounter of The Year” by a national poll of the top US retailing executives, sponsored by Discount Store News. At the awards banquet in Chicago, Bennett credited the corporation's employees as “our secret ingredient" for making Caldor “the finest retail chain in the country".

In 1983, Bennett was elected into the "Discounting Hall of Fame" by the same industry poll, making him the sixth retail executive to receive the honor. Iris Rosenberg, editor of Discount Store News, said: "Carl Bennett typifies the successful entrepreneur who from an inconspicuous start made a dream grow into a major force in the world of mass merchandising".
