= University Mall (Florida) =

Coordinates: 28°3′26″N 82°26′4″W

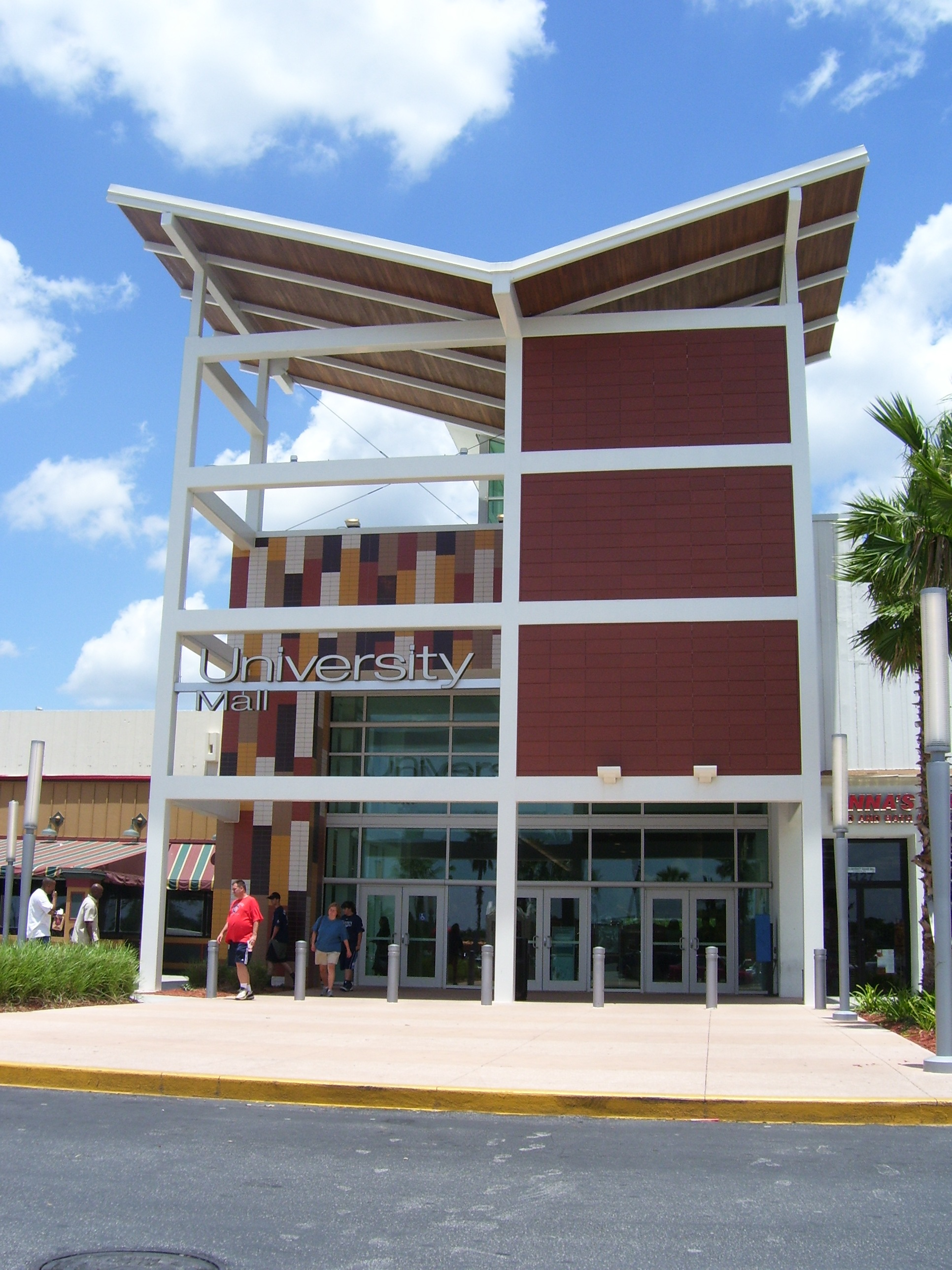
- Entrance of University Mall, 2009
- Location: University, Florida, U.S.
- Opened: August 15, 1974; 52 years ago
- Developer: Edward J. DeBartolo Corporation
- Manager: CBRE Group
- Owner: Somera Capital Management and Rockwood Capital
- Num. of stores: 165
- Num. of anchor tenants: 2
- Floor area: 1,300,000 sq ft (120,000 m^{2})
- Floors: 2 (1 in former Dillard's Outlet, former Grand’s and Burlington, 3 in the parking garage)
- Website: universitymalltampa.com

University Mall, previously University Square Mall, is a shopping mall located near the University of South Florida, just north of the city limits of Tampa on Fowler Avenue. The property is located just east of I-275. The mall has decreased in popularity over the years as online shopping and gentrification of the surrounding area has started to take effect.

The mall is anchored by Burlington and K&G Fashion Superstore. Demolition of the closed section of the mall began on February 19, 2019.

== History ==
University Square Mall was officially dedicated August 15, 1974, with Robinson's of Florida and Maas Brothers, whose location was their sixth to be located in a shopping mall. JCPenney came online on the west end of the mall in October 1974, and Sears began business in September 1975 on the east side. Burdines was added, as a fifth anchor, in 1983 in between Sears and Robinson's. In its early years, the mall had a mascot named "Hootie", an anthropomorphic owl wearing a graduate cap, who was often used in promotions and advertisements.

Robinson's of Florida was rebranded in 1987 by Louisiana's Maison Blanche, which in turn was rebranded in 1991 as a Dillard's, which moved into a newly built store north of the original one in November 1995 to copy the newly built Brandon Town Center. This move was accompanied by a large-scale renovation and expansion of the shopping complex, whereby the vacated Dillard's was gutted and rebuilt as new inline stores, with an upper-level food court. A 16-screen Regal Cinemas adjoined the new food court. These modifications were completed in August 1996.

In 1991, the mall's two Florida-based anchors, Maas Brothers and Burdines were merged under the Burdines nameplate by their parent company. Burdines closed its original store in September 1991 and consolidated its operation into the Maas Brothers store space. The Maas Brothers store was then officially rebranded as Burdines on October 20, 1991. This store became a Burdines-Macy's in January 2004 and a full-fledged Macy's in March 2005. The original Burdines space then housed a Montgomery Ward between March 1992 and February 2001. The space re-opened as a Burlington Coat Factory (now known simply as Burlington) in October 2001, whose stores were not typically at malls at the time. This was likewise done at Tallahassee Mall.

Longtime anchor JCPenney closed effective October 1, 2005, as it relocated to a smaller prototype store at the Shops at Wiregrass in nearby Wesley Chapel, which opened in 2008. Steve & Barry's opened on the first floor of the JCPenney spot in 2006. In October 2008, Dillard's opened a store at the Shops at Wiregrass, which led the store at University Mall to be converted from a standard location into a clearance center and the closure of the store's second floor. In January 2009, both Steve & Barry's and Starbucks closed their University Mall locations.

University Mall's tenant space is owned by LSREF2 Clover Property 18, LLC and overseen by Hudson Advisors, LLC. CBRE was hired in September 2012 to handle property management and leasing.

In August 2010, the Regal Cinemas closed. It was later purchased by Frank Theatres, who downgraded the theatre to 12 screens in 2011. After operating the complex for only 2 years, the theater closed for the second time on January 6, 2013, and was then reopened by Studio Movie Grill in October 2014, renovating the venue into a dine-in cinema.

Macy's closed permanently in March 2017. Dillard's Clearance Center then relocated to the first floor of the former Macy's space two months later, with the second floor of that space remaining closed to the public. This would be the third building at the mall to be occupied by Dillard's in its history. Grand's, a Puerto Rican department store, opened in Dillard's 1995-2017 location in September 2017. The second level of the Grand's space is also vacant.

On March 13, 2018, the mall bought its Sears store from the company, which will remain during the mall's name change from "University Mall" to "Uptown" as it gets a makeover while three new anchors move into the former JCPenney and Steve and Barry's building. On August 22, 2018, Sears announced that they would close this location as part of a plan to close 46 additional stores nationwide. The store closed in November 2018.

As part of the conversion of the mall into "Uptown", the closed section of the mall leading up to the former JCPenney building was demolished in February 2019.

In March 2021, the dine-in Studio Movie Grill theater was closed. LOOK Dine-in Cinemas would reopen the theater in September 2021.

Dillard's Clearance Center closed permanently on April 28, 2022, and the building was demolished to make room for a Sprouts Farmers Market and a new building for Burlington. in 2022 Grand's closed with Family Discount Furniture then taking over the former space.

The LOOK Dine-in Cinemas would close in October 2024 after 3 years of operation. In the following months, it was announced that Sun-Ray Cinema, relocating from Jacksonville, would reopen the movie theater complex in December 2024.

On July 21, 2025, Family Discount Furniture closed.

In late June 2026, demolition work resumed at the former JCPenney building after construction work was halted for six years. Some exterior walls, doors, and windows were stripped from the structure in 2020.
