= Associated Dry Goods =

American department store chain

Associated Dry Goods Corp
- Logo registered in 1964
- Type: Public
- Industry: Retail
- Founded: 1916; 110 years ago
- Defunct: 1986; 40 years ago
- Fate: Acquired by The May Department Stores Company
- Successor: The May Department Stores Company
- Area served: United States
- Website: None

Associated Dry Goods Corporation (ADG) was a chain of department stores that was acquired by The May Department Stores Company in 1986. It was founded in 1916 as an association of independent stores called American Dry Goods, based in New York City.

== History ==
The chain began when Henry Siegel, who had founded department store Siegel, Cooper & Co. in Chicago, obtained financing from Goldman Sachs for a store in New York City in the early twentieth century. Though Siegel failed in his endeavor, the remnants of the chain were merged with John Claflin's stores H.B. Claflin & Company, along with Lord & Taylor, Stewart & Co., Hengerer's, and J. N. Adam & Co. (with financing from J. P. Morgan & Company), to create Associated Dry Goods. Other stores were spun off to Mercantile Stores Co.

Throughout the 1950s, 1960s, and 1970s, ADG expanded through a series of acquisitions. In the 1970s, they created a new St. Petersburg, Florida-based department store, Robinson's of Florida. ADG was best known for its upscale New York City based Lord & Taylor division, with over 84 locations across the country. Lord & Taylor was ADG's largest and most profitable division.

=== Major growth ===
In the early and mid-1980s ADG attempted to rationalize its department stores, focusing on high-growth areas. Several unprofitable department store chains were sold or closed. They merged Hengerer's of Buffalo, New York into Rochester-based Sibley's in 1981. 1983 saw the merger of Cincinnati-based H.& S. Pogue Co. (5 locations) into Indianapolis-based L. S. Ayres. Also in 1983 The Diamond division (2 locations) of West Virginia was sold to Stone & Thomas. In 1984, Stix Baer & Fuller (12 locations) in St. Louis, Missouri was sold to Dillard Department Stores. Also, in 1984, the Baltimore-based Stewart & Company division was merged into its Caldor discount division. The Powers Dry Goods Company (9 locations) in Minneapolis, Minnesota were sold to Allied Stores' The Donaldson Co. in 1985. In early 1986, they merged the Louisville-based Stewart Dry Goods division into its Indianapolis-based L. S. Ayres & Co. operations.

== Founding stores, acquisitions, chain divestitures, closures, and division mergers ==
=== Founding stores ===
- Hahne & Co., Newark, New Jersey
- The William Hengerer Co., Buffalo, New York, (founded 1874)
- J. N. Adam & Co., Buffalo, New York, (founded 1881)
- Lord & Taylor, New York, New York, precursor founded in 1826
- Stewart & Co.

=== Later acquisitions ===
- 1956 – The Diamond (Department Store), Charleston, West Virginia
- 1957 – J. W. Robinson Co., Los Angeles, California
- 1957 -The Sibley, Lindsay & Curr Co., Rochester, New York, and branch stores, founded in 1868
- 1959 – The Erie Dry Goods Co./Boston Store, Erie, Pennsylvania
- 1962 – The H.& S. Pogue Co., Cincinnati, Ohio
- 1963 – Goldwater's, Phoenix, Arizona
- 1966 – Stix, Baer, & Fuller, St. Louis
- 1966 – The Denver Dry Goods Co., Denver, Colorado
- 1970s – Robinson's of Florida, St. Petersburg, Florida
- 1972 – L. S. Ayres & Co., Indianapolis, Indiana
- 1972 – Sycamore Specialty Stores (a division of L. S. Ayres & Co.)
- 1972 – Ayr-Way (a division of L. S. Ayres & Co.)
- 1972 – Joseph Horne Co., Pittsburgh, Pennsylvania
- 1972 – Stewart Dry Goods Co., Louisville, Kentucky
- 1981 – Caldor

=== Chain divestitures, closures and division mergers ===
Several department store divisions were divested or closed prior to the 1986 merger with May Department Stores

- 1981 – Hengerer's of Buffalo, New York was merged into the Rochester-based Sibley's
- 1983 – H. & S. Pogue Co. of Cincinnati was merged into the Indianapolis-based L. S. Ayres
- 1983 – The Diamond, Charleston, West Virginia was sold to Stone & Thomas
- 1984 – Stewart & Company of Baltimore was merged into its Caldor discount division
- 1984 – Stix Baer & Fuller, St. Louis, Missouri was sold to Dillard Department Stores
- 1985 – The Powers Dry Goods Co., Minneapolis, Minnesota was sold to Allied Stores' The Donaldson Co.
- 1986 – Stewart Dry Goods of Louisville was merged into the Indianapolis-based L. S. Ayres & Co.

== Acquisition by May Department Stores ==
ADG was acquired by the May Department Stores Company in October 1986 as part of a US$2.2 billion merger. At the time, it was considered to have been the most expensive purchase/merger in retail history. After 1986, May converted or merged most of the former ADG department stores into its own divisions with the exception of the upscale Lord & Taylor, which was a long-time fashion leader and considered the “crown jewel” of Associated. When the May Company acquired ADG in 1986, it was assumed that May bought ADG just for the upscale Lord & Taylor division.

During the final year of retail operation, ADG operated over 155 department stores, in addition to Caldor (a northeast upscale discount chain), and Loehmann's, (a specialty off price retailer).

=== Timeline of May Company Conversions & Divestitures of former ADG Divisions ===
After the ADG merger, the May Company either divested or merged each of the former ADG divisions into its own regional nameplates:

- 1986 – Joseph Horne Co. sold to Pittsburgh investor group due to a possible anti-trust suit by City of Pittsburgh
- 1987 – Denver Dry Goods Co. converted to May D&F
- 1987 – Robinson's of Florida sold to Maison Blanche/Goudchaux Co. of Baton Rouge, Louisiana, to be operated as Maison Blanche stores
- 1988 – Loehmann's sold to an investor group led by Spanish concern, Sefinco Ltd., and the Sprout Group, a division of Donaldson, Lufkin & Jenrette
- 1989 – Goldwater's merged into J. W. Robinson's, May Company California, and May D&F
- 1989 – Hahne & Co. converted into Lord & Taylor
- 1990 – Caldor sold in leveraged buy out
- 1991 – L. S. Ayres, (Indianapolis, Indiana) merged into Famous-Barr but continued operating under the L. S. Ayres nameplate
- 1986 – H & S Pogue, (Cincinnati, Ohio), formerly converted in 1983 by ADG to L. S. Ayres, sold to Hess's & JC Penney
- 1987 – Stewart Dry Goods Co., (Louisville, Kentucky), formerly converted in 1984 by ADG to L. S. Ayres, sold to Hess's
- 1992 – Sibley's converted into Kaufmann's
- 1992 – J. W. Robinson's merged with May Company California to form Robinsons-May

Lord & Taylor, the last remaining nameplate, in 2021 converted to an online-only.

== History by nameplate ==
The Denver Dry Goods Company, Denver, Colorado, was acquired by ADG in 1966. The division consisted of 12 stores in Colorado. After the 1986 May/ADG merger, it was largely shutdown and sold-off and the remaining units were absorbed by May D&F (May Daniels & Fischer) in 1987. May D&F ended up absorbing 3 stores from The Denver Dry Goods Co.. In 1989, May D&F also absorbed ADG's former Goldwater's location in Albuquerque. In 1993, May D&F was merged into May's Foley's division of Houston. After May was bought by Federated, it was announced that most Foley's stores (including the former Denver Dry Goods/May D&F locations) would either be converted to Macy's or sold.

The Diamond, Charleston, West Virginia, was a small 2 store division located in West Virginia. ADG sold this division in 1983 to Stone & Thomas due to limited growth potential.

Goldwaters, Phoenix, Arizona, was founded in Gila City, Arizona in 1860. It moved to Phoenix in 1872 and was acquired by Associated in 1963. It consisted of 9 locations in Arizona, New Mexico, and Nevada. The chain became a division of May as part of the May/ADG merger in 1986. May dissolved the division in 1989 and split the stores into three other May divisions. Eventually May D&F, May Company California and J. W. Robinson's absorbed various stores with the Tucson-area stores being sold to Dillard's Department Stores.

The H.& S. Pogue Co., Cincinnati, Ohio, was acquired by Associated Dry Goods Corp. in 1962. In 1984, it was merged into L. S. Ayres & Co. of Indianapolis. After the May/ADG merger, its former branch locations were swiftly shuttered or sold to Hess's and JCPenney in 1987 and 1988 and the downtown flagship demolished.

Hahne & Co., Newark, New Jersey, was part of the 1916 conglomeration of American Dry Goods (later renamed Associated). After relocating its corporate offices from downtown Newark to a strip mall nearby to its Woodbridge, N.J. store; there had been consideration to moving to the new "flagship store" in the mid-1980s to the former Gimbels at Westfield Garden State Plaza but Sunday operating law in Bergen County prevented this—its 9 stores were shut down by May in 1989. Most of them (six) were absorbed by Lord & Taylor, while the large Westfield Garden State Plaza store was bought by Nordstrom.

Hengerer's (The William Hengerer Co.), Buffalo, New York, was founded in 1874 as Barnes, Bancroft & Co.. It adopted the Hengerer name in 1895 and was purchased in 1905 by J. N. Adam & Co. It was a division of Associated Dry Goods Corp. from its inception in 1916. In 1981, ADG merged Hengerer's into Sibley, Lindsay & Curr Co. of Rochester. After the May/ADG merger, Sibley's was merged into May's Kaufmann's division in 1992. After May was bought by Federated, it was announced that most Kaufmann's stores would either be converted to Macy's or sold. All the former Hengerer's locations became Macy's in September 2006.

Joseph Horne Co., Pittsburgh, Pennsylvania. This was historically the "carriage trade" department store of Pittsburgh. For several decades was in direct competition with cross-town rival Kaufmann's (a division of May). It was acquired by Associated Dry Goods in 1972 – and eventually acquired by May in October 1986 as part of the May/ADG merger. Due to anti-trust concerns and legal action by the City of Pittsburgh, it was promptly sold in December 1986 to an investor group. After several years of private ownership, it was announced the Dillard's would be buying the chain to combine it with the Dillard/DeBartolo co-owned Higbee's stores based in Cleveland. However, the deal collapsed and was not completed. Eventually the Joseph Horne Co. was sold off in parts, with Dillard's acquiring its three Ohio stores in 1992 and Federated Department Stores Lazarus division acquiring its remaining ten Pennsylvania stores in 1995. Federated eventually merged all of its divisions (including the former Joseph Horne/Lazarus locations) into Macy's.

J. N. Adam & Co., Buffalo, New York, was founded in 1881. It purchased Hengerer's in 1905 and, later that same year, both were sold to H.B. Claflin & Co., They later became United Dry Goods Companies. It was a division of Associated Dry Goods Corp. from its inception in 1916. The chain closed in 1960.

L. S. Ayres & Co, Indianapolis, Indiana, was acquired by Associated Dry Goods Corp in 1972. L. S. Ayres & Co. absorbed Pogue's of Cincinnati in 1984 and Stewart's of Louisville in 1985. Upon completion of these mergers, L. S. Ayres & Co. consisted of 25 stores in Indiana, Ohio, and Kentucky, After the 1986 May/ADG merger, the under-performing locations of both former chains were swiftly divested by May in 1987 and 1988. L. S. Ayres & Co. was shortened to L. S. Ayres and was operationally consolidated with Famous-Barr in 1991 (but continuing to operate under the L. S. Ayres moniker), when its downtown Indianapolis flagship and three other under-performing stores were closed. After May was bought by Federated, it was announced that most Famous-Barr – L. S. Ayres stores would either be converted to Macy's or sold.

Lord & Taylor, New York, New York, was founded in 1826. The chain was a founding member of the Associated Dry Goods Corp. organization (then American Dry Goods) in 1916. It became part of May in the 1986 May/ADG merger. While a part of Associated and under the leadership of CEO Joseph E. Brooks, during the 1970s, the chain aggressively expanded into Texas, Illinois, and Michigan. In the early 1980s, South Florida saw 11 stores opened in quick succession. They partially withdrew from the oil-shocked Texas and southern Florida markets in 1989–1990 after the 1986 May/ADG merger. After May assumed ownership, ADG's Hahne's division (several New Jersey locations) and several former John Wanamaker (Philadelphia) locations were combined under the Lord & Taylor name-plate. From 1997 to 2006, Lord & Taylor occupied the former Wanamaker's landmark store in downtown Philadelphia. During the 1990s and early 2000s, May took the chain national. Under the leadership of CEO Marshall Hilsberg, Lord & Taylor entered expansion mode opening stores as far west as Las Vegas, Nevada. At its then peak, Lord & Taylor operated as many as 86 stores across the country.

May was purchased by Federated Department Stores in June 2005. Terry Lundgren, Federated's chairman, president and chief executive officer, announced on January 12, 2006 that Federated Department Stores would be selling the Lord & Taylor chain by the end of the year. On June 22, 2006, it was announced that NRDC Equity Partners, LLC would purchase Lord & Taylor for $1.2 billion (~$1.79 billion in 2024). The sale that was completed four months later in October 2006. After its 2008 purchase of the Canadian department store retailer Hudson's Bay Company, NRDC has stated that it plans to open stores internationally. In 2019, clothing rental firm Le Tote purchased the Lord & Taylor chain. On August 27, 2020, it was announced that Lord & Taylor will be going out of business after a bankruptcy filing on August 2, six years shy of its 200th anniversary.

The Powers Dry Goods Co, Minneapolis, Minnesota, consisted of 7 locations. In 1985, it was acquired by The Donaldson Company (of Minneapolis, a unit of Allied Stores Corp.), which gave Donaldson's some breathing room against dominant rival Dayton's. In 1987, after Campeau Corp.'s buy-out of Allied Stores Corp., Donaldson's was purchased by Carson Pirie Scott & Co. of Chicago which renamed its stores with its own imprimatur. Carson's in turn was acquired by P.A. Bergner & Co. of Milwaukee (and formerly of Peoria, Illinois) in 1989. They filed for bankruptcy in 1991. In 1995 Carson's sold the Minneapolis locations (formerly Powers/Donaldsons) to Dayton's parent Dayton Hudson Corp. Many of which re-opened under its moderate Mervyn's chain. This was mostly in a move to prevent serious competition in its Twin Cities stronghold. In 2004 when Dayton's successor Marshall Field's was acquired by May, it also agreed to buy the former Donaldson/Powers locations, which Mervyn's promptly shuttered, and left May responsible for disposing of the real-estate.

J. W. Robinson's – Los Angeles, California, was a division of Associated Dry Goods since 1957, and consisted of 21 locations in California. J. W. Robinson's was acquired by May in the October 1986 May/ADG merger. It was historically a carriage-trade department store and operated in tandem with May's own middle-tier May Company California division for several years. In 1989 it took over operation of the Goldwaters stores in Phoenix, Arizona. In 1992, as part of divisional consolidations by the May Company, the J.W. Robinson Co. division was merged with the May Company California division to form a single Los Angeles based division to be called Robinsons-May. After May was bought by Federated, it was announced that most Robinsons-May stores would either be converted to Macy's or sold.

Robinson's of Florida – St. Petersburg, Florida, was a division of Associated Dry Goods when acquired by May in 1986. It had been founded in the 1970s as an attempt by ADG to emulate the success of its upscale J.W. Robinson's stores (of Los Angeles) on the fast-growing Florida Gulf Coast. Rather than invest in the then stagnant Florida market, May sold the division in 1987 (seven stores) to Maison Blanche/Gouchaux Co. of Baton Rouge, Louisiana, to be operated as Maison Blanche stores. The bulk of the former Robinsons of Florida locations were subsequently sold by Maison Blanche to Dillard Department Stores in 1991.

The Sibley, Lindsay & Curr Co. – Rochester, New York, and Syracuse, New York, founded in 1868, was since 1961 a division of Associated Dry Goods Corporation and was acquired by May in the 1986 May/ADG merger. It consisted of 14 locations in NY. It had previously absorbed the William Hengerer Co. in Buffalo in 1981. In 1992, Sibley's, as it was informally known, was merged into Kaufmann's. After May was bought by Federated, it was announced that most Kaufmann's stores (including the former Sibley's locations) would either be converted to Macy's or sold.

The Stewart Dry Goods Co. – Louisville, Kentucky, consisted of seven stores in Kentucky and Indiana. In 1985, it was merged into L. S. Ayres & Co. of Indianapolis and after the May/ADG merger in 1986, its former locations were shuttered or sold to Hess's in 1987.

Stewart & Company – Baltimore, Maryland. ADG closed this Baltimore based division in 1982. All stores were converted into Caldor stores over an 18-month period.

Stix Baer & Fuller – St. Louis and Kansas City, Missouri. In 1984, this division was sold after several years of continued losses. Dillard Department Stores acquired ADG's Stix, Baer & Fuller's 12 stores for approximately $93 million. The downtown St. Louis flagship building was operated as a Dillard's for several years, then converted into a Dillard's clearance center, and finally shuttered.

=== Discount and off-price chains owned by ADG ===
Loehmann's – the Bronx, New York. Loehmann's was acquired by ADG in 1983, and consisted of 81 locations in 28 states. This acquisition gave ADG a major entry in the rapidly growing off-price retailing market. After the 1986 May/ADG merger, May quickly sold the division.

Caldor – Norwalk, Connecticut. Caldor, an upscale discounter, consisted of 109 stores in New England and Mid Atlantic States. After the 1986 May/ADG merger, May promptly sold the division. The chain entered bankruptcy and was liquidated in 1999.

== Additional information about ADG and May Department Stores ==
See also the May Department Stores listing for very comprehensive information about May and all of May's current and former divisions. See also Federated Department Stores, Lord & Taylor, and Dillard's Department Stores
