= Paddock Mall =

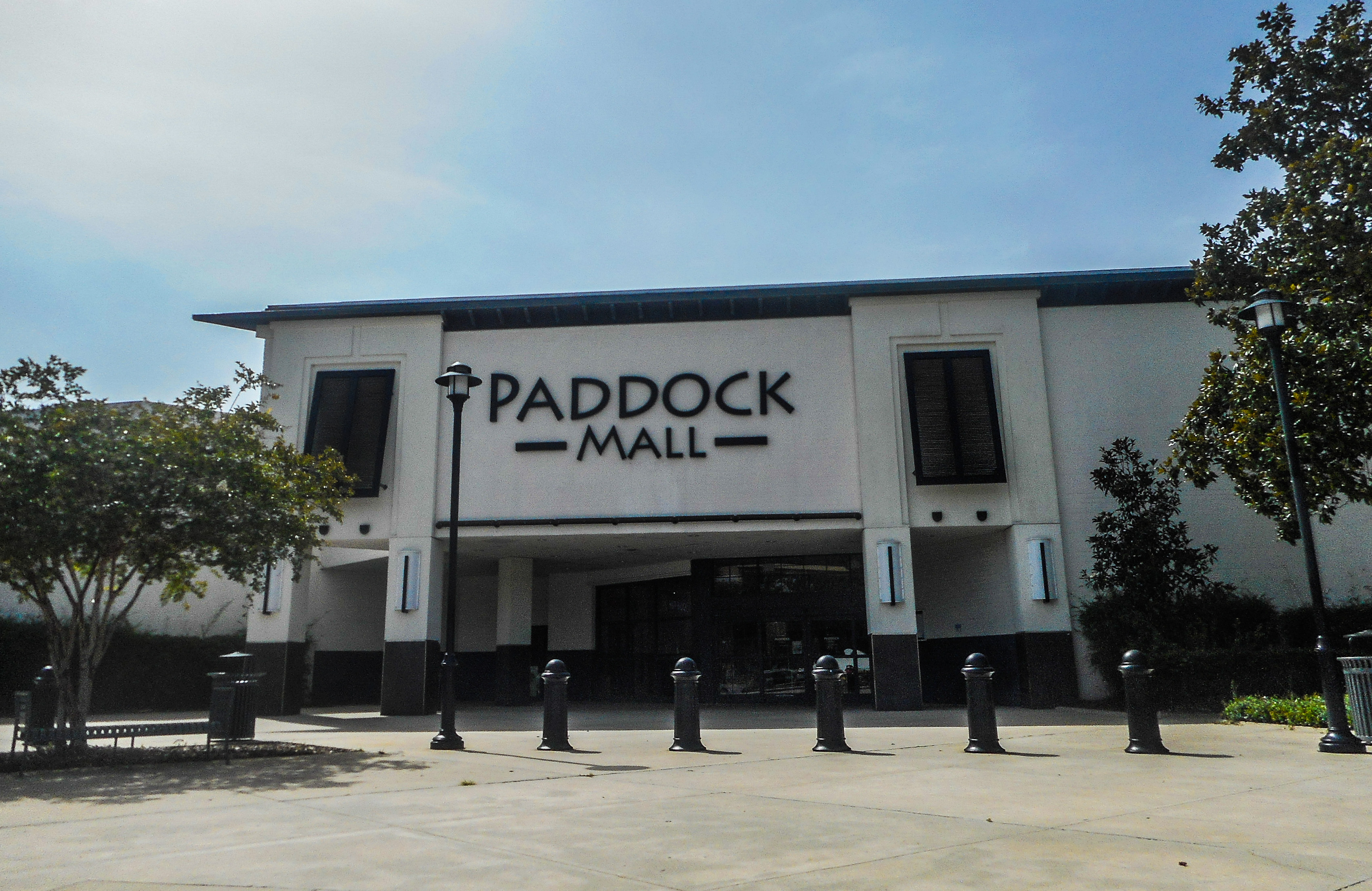
- Exterior view, June 2020
- Location: Ocala, Florida, United States
- Coordinates: 29.158824°N 82.17318°W
- Address: 3100 SW College St.
- Opened: August 13, 1980; 46 years ago
- Developer: Edward J. DeBartolo Corporation
- Manager: CBL Properties
- Owner: CBL Properties
- Num. of stores: 93
- Num. of anchor tenants: 4
- Floor area: 555,310 sq ft (51,590 m^{2})
- Floors: 1
- Website: paddockmall.com

Paddock Mall is an enclosed shopping mall in Ocala, Florida. Opened in 1980, the anchor stores are JCPenney, Macy's, Belk, and Paddock Market. Paddock Market offers a wide variety of shops and restaurants and acts as an extension off of the main mall complex.

== History ==
The first plan for Paddock Mall was made in 1973 by local developers, who sold the land to Edward J. DeBartolo Corporation. DeBartolo and Arlen Realty and Development Corporation opened Paddock Mall in 1980. Original anchors included Maas Brothers, Belk-Lindsey, and JCPenney.

A 1991 expansion added Sears as a fourth anchor; the same year, the Maas Brothers store was absorbed into Burdines. In 1997, a food court was added on the south end. Burdines became Burdines-Macy's in 2003 and then just Macy's in 2005.

=== 2010s ===
Washington Prime Group, based in Columbus, Ohio acquired the mall along with Boynton Beach Mall, Edison Mall, Seminole Towne Center, and Melbourne Square as part of its merger with Glimcher Properties in 2014.

In 2015, Sears Holdings spun off 235 of its properties, including the Sears at Paddock Mall, into Seritage Growth Properties.

On October 15, 2018, it was announced that Sears would be closing as part of a plan to close 142 stores nationwide.

=== 2020s ===
On October 5, 2022, it was announced that the former Sears store would be redeveloped into a mixed-use development. The development was named Paddock Market.

On December 23, 2023, a targeted shooting at Paddock Mall in Ocala, Florida, resulted in one dead (David Nathaniel Barron) and one injured. Mall evacuation took place, and a person of interest was sought. The motive was unknown. One man killed, one woman shot in the leg at Paddock Mall in Ocala; suspect Albert Shell Jr. was arrested on January 8, 2024.

On July 29, 2025, Washington Prime Group sold Paddock Mall to CBL Properties.

In December, 2025, Paddock Market opened in the former Sears utilizing most of the building. The former Sears Auto Center, attached to the mall complex, was sold to Restaurant Depot Ocala.
