= Gulf View Square =

Gulf View Square Mall
- Location: Port Richey, Florida, United States
- Coordinates: 28.2935°N 82.7128°W
- Address: 9409 US HWY 19
- Opened: March 1980; 46 years ago
- Developer: Edward J. DeBartolo
- Manager: Mason asset Management
- Owner: Namdar Realty Group
- Num. of stores: 100+
- Num. of anchor tenants: 6 (2 open, 1 vacant, 3 demolished)
- Floor area: 756,000 sq ft (70,200 m^{2})
- Floors: 1 (1 in Dillard's clearance 2nd floor closed)
- Website: shopgulfviewsquare.com

Gulf View Square Mall is an enclosed mall in Port Richey, Florida. Opened in 1980, it is anchored by Best Buy & Dillard's Clearance Store and is owned by Namdar Realty Group.

== History ==
Edward J. DeBartolo Corporation first proposed Gulf View Square in 1974. At the time, its anchor stores were slated to be Sears, Maas Brothers, Belk-Lindsey, and Robinson's of Florida. The mall opened in March 1980 with Belk-Lindsey and Montgomery Ward as its anchor stores. Maas Brothers opened in August 1981, with Sears following in July 1982.

JCPenney opened on the fifth anchor slot, which was originally planned for Burdines, in 1990. Burdines ultimately entered the mall by taking over the Maas Brothers store a year later.

Dillard's bought the Belk-Lindsey store in 1992. Casual Corner, Off The Wall, and Chess King all closed in 1996. A food court was added in 1998. In 2001, Dillard's relocated from the former Belk to the former Montgomery Ward. As a result, the former Dillard's store was demolished in 2002 for Linens 'n Things and Best Buy. Linens 'n Things closed in 2008 and TJ Maxx opened in 2010 and closed in 2021. Burdines became Burdines-Macy's in 2003 and Macy's in 2005. Old Navy, which opened in 2000, closed in 2009.

On January 15, 2014, JCPenney announced that they would be closing as part of a plan to close 33 stores nationwide. JCPenney ended its 24-year run as anchor on August 2, 2014. On January 8, 2015, Macy's announced that its store would be closing as part of a plan to close 14 stores nationwide. The store closed in May 2015.

Washington Prime Group sold Gulf View Square Mall to Namdar Realty Group in February 2017 for $15 million.

On December 28, 2018, it was announced that Sears would be closing as part of a plan to close 80 stores nationwide. The store closed March 2019.
