= Tyrone Square Mall =

- Food court entrance in 2025
- Location: St. Petersburg, Florida
- Coordinates: 27°47′38″N 82°44′00″W
- Opened: 1972
- Developer: Edward J. DeBartolo Corporation
- Manager: Simon Property Group
- Owner: Simon Property Group
- Num. of stores: 151
- Num. of anchor tenants: 7
- Floor area: 960,215 square feet (89,206.9 square meters)
- Floors: 1 (2 in Dillard's, JCPenney, and Macy's)
- Public transit: PSTA bus: 5, 7, 18, 20, 22, 23, 38, 62, 68, 73, 75, 79
- Website: www.simon.com/mall/tyrone-square

Tyrone Square (also referred to as Tyrone Square Mall) is an enclosed shopping mall in St. Petersburg, Florida. Opened in 1972, it features Aldi, Dick's Sporting Goods, Dillard's, Five Below, JCPenney, Macy's and PetSmart as its anchor stores.

== History ==
Tyrone Square's first anchor, Sears, opened as a freestanding store in April 1968, four years before the rest of the mall. Tyrone Square Mall was built by the Edward J. DeBartolo Corporation and construction began in 1971. In addition to the pre-existing Sears, three additional anchors were planned for the mall, including JCPenney and Maas Brothers. The fourth anchor was the first Robinson's of Florida, the newly created Florida division of California-based J.W. Robinson's.

Maas Brothers opened on August 17, 1972, and it was their third store to be located in a shopping mall (their first and second mall stores were at Edison Mall and WestShore Plaza, respectively).

The mall itself was officially opened on October 5, 1972. Upon its opening, the mall featured more than 110 stores, including Hickory Farms, Chess King, Thom McAn, McCrory, Spencer Gifts, Bresler's Ice Cream, Hot Sam pretzels, Orange Julius, Kinney Shoes, Hallmark Cards, Casual Corner, Waldenbooks, and a six-screen movie theater. JCPenney opened on January 3, 1973 at the west end of the mall where they still operate today.

Robinson's of Florida was the last anchor to open, which debuted on September 4, 1973. Robinson's sold its entire Florida division to Maison Blanche, a Louisiana-based department store, in 1987. By 1991, Maison Blanche had sold its Tyrone Square location and six others on the Gulf Coast of Florida to Dillard's who still operates at the mall today.

Also in 1991, Maas Brothers was merged with its former rival Burdines by their parent company under the Burdines nameplate. At the time, Burdines operated a store at the Crossroads shopping center across the street from Tyrone Square. In the wake of the merger, Burdines closed its store at Crossroads (which later became a Montgomery Ward) on September 28, 1991 and consolidated its operation with Maas Brothers at Tyrone Square. The Maas Brothers store was officially rebranded as Burdines on October 20, 1991. Burdines was subsequently renamed Burdines-Macy's in 2003, dropping the Burdines name two years later. Macy's still operates at the mall today.

Mall expansion in 1998 brought a food court and a Borders Books & Music store (now Designer Shoe Warehouse).

The long-standing Gap closed in 2015, with a toys and games store taking its place. In 2015, Sears Holdings spun off 235 of its properties, including the Sears at Tyrone Square Mall, into Seritage Growth Properties. The Cobb Tyrone Luxury 10 Theatres (now CMX Cinemas Tyrone Luxury 10) opened in 2016, with 10 theaters and 1,200 seats. It is located in an adjacent yet detached building near JCPenney.

On November 16, 2016, Sears announced that it would close its location on January 28, 2017 because of a redevelopment project by Seritage that brought in PetSmart, Lucky's Market (became Hitchcock's Green Market in 2020, which subsequently closed in 2022, and became Aldi in 2024), Five Below, and Dick's Sporting Goods. Outparcels on the Seritage site include America's Best, Nitrogen Ice Cream, Verizon Wireless, Chili's, Portillo's, Torchy's Tacos, and LongHorn Steakhouse.
