= Maison Blanche =

Department store in New Orleans, US

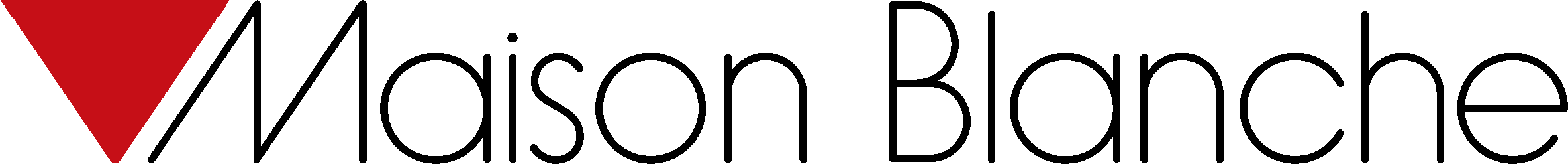
- Type: private
- Industry: Retail
- Founded: 1897
- Defunct: 1998
- Fate: Acquired by Dillard's or locations sold to Foley's
- Successor: Dillard's (1998-present) or Foley's (1998-2006) now Macy's (2006-present)
- Headquarters: New Orleans, Louisiana
- Products: Clothing, footwear, bedding, furniture, jewelry, beauty products, and housewares
- Parent: Formerly Mercantile Stores Company, Inc.(1992-1998)
- Website: None

Maison Blanche (French pronunciation: [mɛzɔ̃ blɑ̃ʃ], White House) was a department store in New Orleans, Louisiana, and later also a chain of department stores. It was founded in 1897 by Isidore Newman, an immigrant from Germany.

Maison Blanche is perhaps best remembered for introducing the locally popular Mr. Bingle Christmas mascot and for its landmark flagship store on Canal Street.

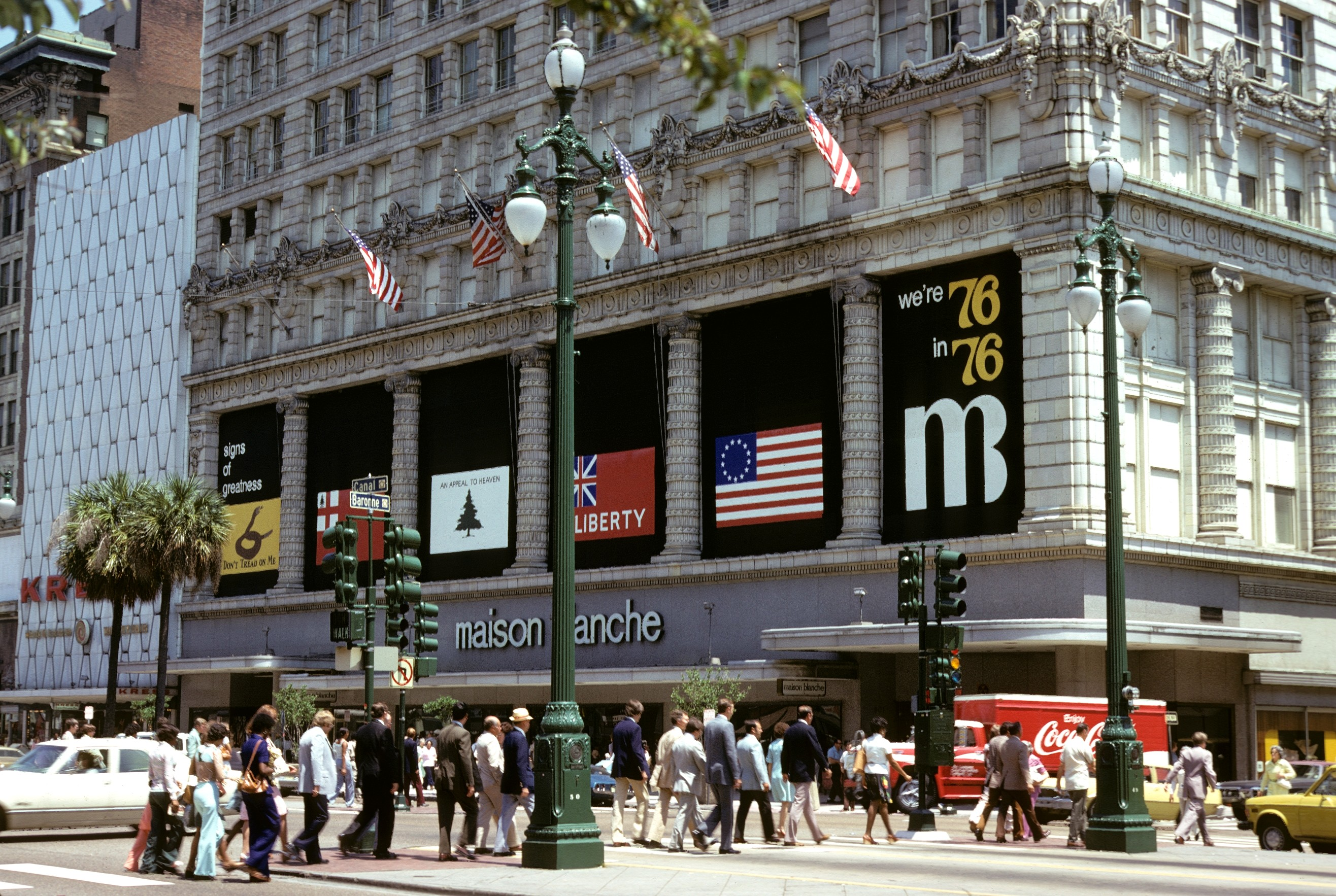
Outside the Maison Blanche department store on Canal Street, 1976

== Corporate history ==
Maison Blanche was acquired in 1923 by City Stores Company, which merged Maison Blanche with Loveman's in 1950. City Stores Co. filed for bankruptcy in July 1979. While in bankruptcy, they initially intended to consolidate the seven Maison Blanche stores with four B. Lowenstein's stores in Memphis, Tennessee, to form the Maison Blanche Department Stores group, but in early 1982 the Memphis stores were shuttered.

Instead, three of the seven existing Maison Blanche stores, as well as the name, were purchased by Goudchaux's, Inc. of Baton Rouge, owned by the Sternberg brothers. Operating as Goudchaux/Maison Blanche, the new company eventually reopened the original Canal Street flagship in 1984, leasing three floors from the new owners.

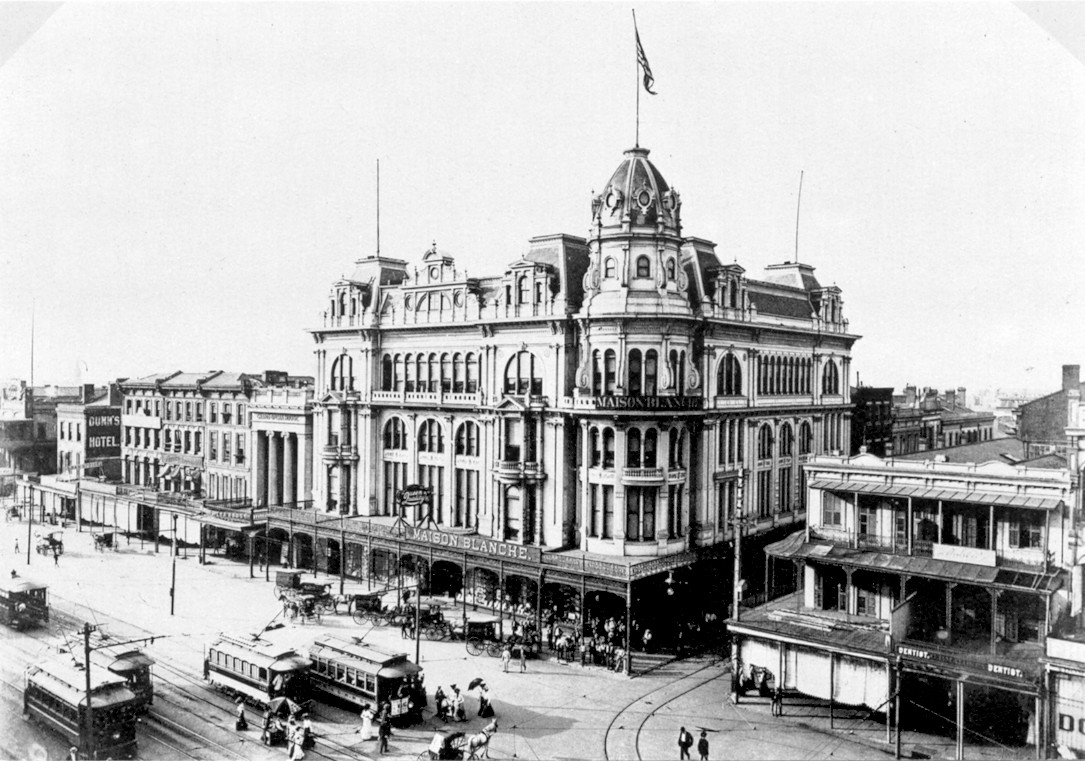
Old Maison Blanche building in 1898

In the late 1980s, May Department Stores abandoned Florida by selling two chains, which allowed the company to enter the fast-growing Florida market. In 1987, the 10-unit Robinson's of Florida on Florida's Gulf Coast (Tyrone Square Mall, University Square Mall, WestShore Plaza, Countryside Mall, Southgate Plaza, Edison Mall, and Coastland Center) and Orlando (Orlando Fashion Square, Altamonte Mall, and The Florida Mall), plus an 11th at Lakeland Square Mall were sold to them. A year later, they also bought the 5-unit Jacksonville-based "May Florida" (formerly May Cohens) by taking over three Jacksonville stores (Roosevelt Square, Regency Square, and Orange Park Mall), and Volusia Mall in Daytona Beach, while closing the Gateway Mall location. The Goudchaux name was removed and all stores were renamed Maison Blanche. After opening 2 more stores in 1990-one replaced an existing store at Orlando Fashion Square and a 4th in Jacksonville at the brand new Avenues Mall-the number of Florida stores were added to 16. However, both the rapid expansion and the oil-related recession in Louisiana proved to be too much for Maison Blanche to manage. In August 1991, eight stores on Florida's Gulf Coast were sold to Dillard's, giving them those locations (Tyrone, university, WestShore, Countryside, Southgate, Edison, Coastland, and Lakeland). This also left MB with eight stores each in both Louisiana and Florida until Mercantile Stores Inc. purchased the 16-store unit in February 1992, thus converting the rest of their Florida stores to Gayfers, which gained these units (Roosevelt, Regency, Fashion Square, Orange Park, Volusia, Altamonte, Florida, and Avenues). The Louisiana stores continued to operate under the Maison Blanche name before Dillard's acquired Mercantile Stores in 1998. The Little Rock retailer subsequently closed the Canal Street store after briefly operating it. The acquisition of Maison Blanche came nearly a decade after Dillard's had purchased another New Orleans area retail institution and Canal Street landmark—D.H. Holmes.

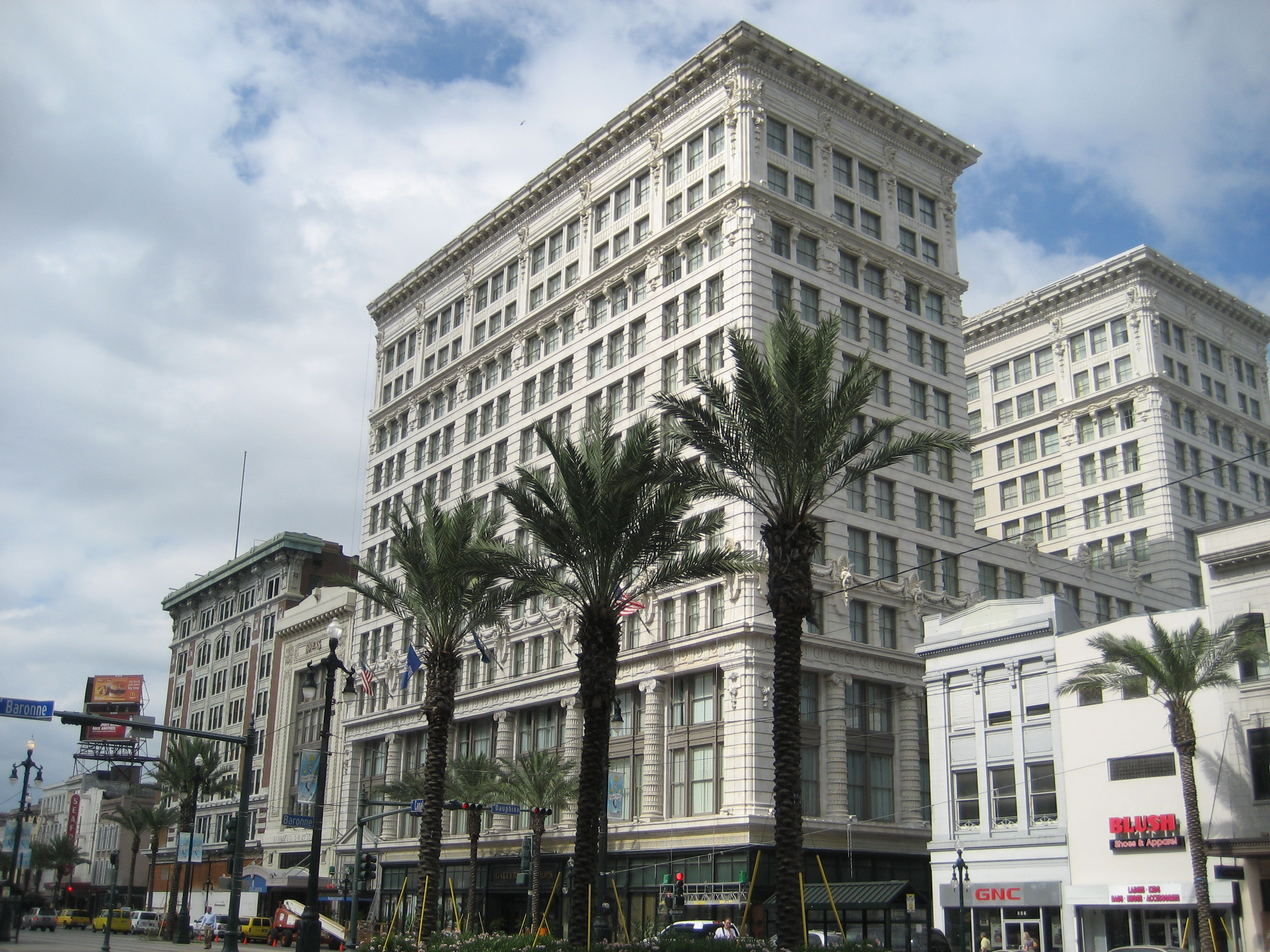
The Maison Blanche Building on Canal Street

Solari's gourmet food store operated a satellite location within the Canal Street location of Maison Blanche.

== Canal Street landmark ==
Maison Blanche's original building was on Canal Street. This was demolished around 1908. A distinctive new building, which still stands, was constructed around 1908 to 1909. At one time there were many medical and dental offices in the top floors; later they became largely empty.

The Canal Street store was closed in 1982 by the City Stores Company and reopened in 1984. In 1993, the New Orleans-based sludge metal band Eyehategod used the 13th floor of the building for the recording of their second album, Take as Needed for Pain. In 1997 work began to use the upper floors as part of a new Ritz-Carlton hotel. The original plan was for the lower floors to continue to operate as a Maison Blanche department store. However, after Dillard's acquired the store with the purchase of the remainder of the Maison Blanche chain, they closed the Canal Street store. The whole building, along with the neighboring Kress building, is now part of the New Orleans Ritz Carlton, which had a grand opening on October 6, 2000.

The hotel was occupied during and immediately after Hurricane Katrina. It suffered considerable damage; for example the basement was flooded and the electrical systems, laundry, and staff cafeteria, among other things, were damaged. The Ritz-Carlton reopened on December 4, 2006, after a $106 million (~$163 million in 2025) refurbishment.

== See also ==
- D. H. Holmes

== Notes ==
- Sternberg, Hans J. We Were Merchants: The Sternberg Family and the Story of Goudchaux's and Maison Blanche Department Stores. Baton Rouge, LA.:Louisiana State University Press, 2009 ISBN 978-0-8071-3449-8
