= Coastland Center =

Shopping mall in Naples, Florida

- Location: Naples, Florida, United States
- Coordinates: 26.1698658°N 81.7957888°W
- Address: 1900 Tamiami Trail North
- Opened: 1977; 49 years ago
- Developer: John D. Smith
- Manager: JLL
- Num. of stores: 122
- Num. of anchor tenants: 4
- Floor area: 950,000 square feet (88,000 m^{2})
- Floors: 1 (2 in Dillard's, Macy's and former Sears, 1 in JCPenney)
- Website: coastlandcenter.com

Coastland Center is a shopping mall located in Naples, Florida, United States. Opened in 1976, it features Macy's, JCPenney, and Dillard's as its anchors. It hosts a food court and many other specialty stores. The food court is the main attraction. The mall itself is situated on just one floor, but all of the anchor stores (except JCPenney) have two floors.

== History ==
Coastland Center was built in the mid 1970s, and it was originally anchored by Sears and Maas Brothers, a Tampa-based department store. Maas Brothers opened on February 3, 1977, making it the first store to open. Sears opened on July 27, 1977. The first segment of the mall itself, which was an L-shaped section between Sears and Maas Brothers, opened on September 28, 1977.

In 1985, the mall underwent its first major expansion, which included additional mall space and two additional anchors on the east side. The first new anchor was JCPenney, which opened on February 6, 1985. The second new anchor was Robinson's of Florida, the Florida division of California-based J. W. Robinson's, which opened on October 20, 1985. Robinson's only lasted two years before its Florida stores were sold to Maison Blanche, a Louisiana-based department store, in 1987. The store was officially rebranded as Maison Blanche on March 28, 1988. In August 1991, Maison Blanche sold its Naples location and six others on the Gulf Coast of Florida to Dillard's.

Maas Brothers was rebranded as Burdines on October 20, 1991 after the two Florida-based stores were merged by their parent company. Burdines was renamed Burdines-Macy's on January 30, 2004 as the brands were merged by their parent company. On March 6, 2005, the Burdines name was officially dropped and the stores were fully merged into Macy's, who still operates at the mall today.

The mall received another expansion from 1995 to 1996 which largely focused on the anchors. Sears and Burdines added second floors to their stores and Dillard's built a new two-story store behind their previous store. The former Dillard's store was demolished and replaced with a new larger food court and additional mall space connecting to the new Dillard's store. JCPenney expanded their store to the east, which added a second mall entrance across from the new food court. Parking garages were also added during this expansion. The mall was further renovated in 2006.

In 2015, Sears Holdings spun off 235 of its properties, including the Sears at Coastland Center, into Seritage Growth Properties.

On August 22, 2018, it was announced that Sears would be closing as part of a plan to close 46 stores nationwide. The store closed in November 2018. In November 2018, the Naples Daily News announced that a CMX Cinemas movie theater would replace the former Sears location in 2020 and the building was demolished in July 2019. The theater opened on October 1, 2021 with showings of Venom: Let There Be Carnage, The Addams Family 2, The Many Saints of Newark and Singing in the Rain. Outparcels on the Seritage site include Twin Peaks and Uncle Julio's. A Bahama Breeze restaurant opened in 2024, but closed the following year amid restructuring.

In 2026, GGP divested the mall, to which JLL has taken over management.
