= DeSoto Square Mall =

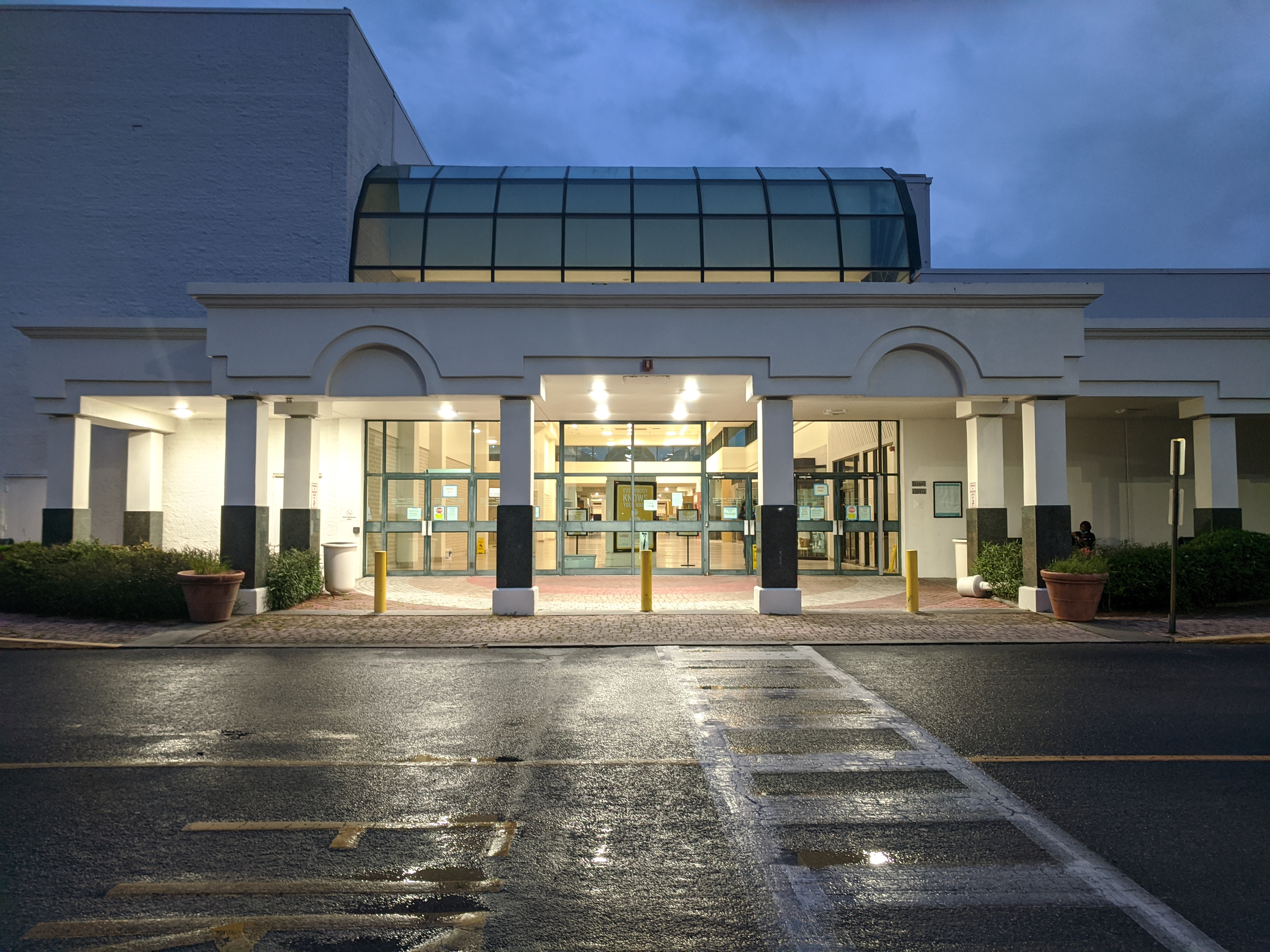
- Mall entrance in November 2020
- Location: Bradenton, Florida, United States
- Coordinates: 27.4657°N 82.5668°W
- Address: 303 301 Boulevard West
- Opened: August 15, 1973; 53 years ago
- Closed: April 30, 2021
- Developer: Edward J. DeBartolo, Sr.
- Manager: Dave Marcinko
- Owner: Madison Properties
- Num. of stores: 30+
- Num. of anchor tenants: 4
- Floor area: 678,000 square feet (63,000 m^{2})
- Floors: 1

DeSoto Square Mall was an enclosed shopping mall serving Bradenton, Florida, United States. It was built in 1973 and permanently closed on April 30, 2021.

== History ==
In November 1971, Bradenton Mall Corporation bought 100 acres (0.40 km^{2}) along US 301 and Cortez Road for $1.6 million from 32 property owners. Bradenton's mayor, A.K. Leach, was concerned that the mall which was outside of city limits would impact retailers in the downtown area but he thought they would be able to manage through it.

The center was built by Edward J. DeBartolo Corporation in 1973. It was originally planned to be called Bradenton Mall, but the name was determined unacceptable by city officials because the mall was not located within city limits. The company decided to change the name to DeSoto Square Mall in response. A spokesman for DeBartolo corporation said the corporation thought it would identify more with the local community because of the annual DeSoto Celebration. Richard Turner, the president of the Manatee County Conquistador Group, suggested the name as he thought it would draw more attention to the celebration.

The mall had its grand opening on August 15, 1973, with about 37 shops open. At the time of its opening, the mall had three planned anchor stores: Sears, JCPenney and Maas Brothers. JCPenney did not initially open in August 1973 and instead opened in January 1974 as the last pre-planned anchor store to open. During the mall's initial opening, Piccadilly Cafeteria opened and remained until May 2003. Cafeterias were popular in shopping malls prior to food courts replacing them. A Montgomery-Roberts department store was added in November 1973.

Future president Ronald Reagan visited the mall on February 26, 1976, while campaigning for president that year. Parking facilities would be expanded in 1978 which led to the demolition of the Suncoast Motel. The motel was originally named Pike's Court and opened in 1953 with Leonard and Edith Pike owning it. The motel was sold in 1956 to Mary Biggs who renamed it to Suncoast Motel. Belk-Lindsey was added as a fourth anchor in June 1979, after having been evicted from a nearby store at Cortez Plaza.

Burdines expressed interest in opening a store at DeSoto Square as early as 1979, though they did not join the mall until 1991 when the company merged with Maas Brothers. The Maas Brothers store was officially rebranded as Burdines on October 20, 1991. A year later, Belk sold its store in the mall to Dillard's. During the late 1980s, there would be "talk about adding a food court" but nothing materialized. A food court named Port O'Call with a tropical theme opened in April 1997. During the opening ceremony, Dawn Wells who played the character Mary Ann on the television show Gilligan's Island appeared as a judge for a contest for who could dress the best as a castaway from the show. Old Navy was added in 2000. Burdines was renamed Burdines-Macy's on January 30, 2004 as the brands were merged by their parent company. On March 6, 2005, the Burdines name was officially dropped and the stores were fully merged into Macy's.

Several stores closed in 2009 due to the Great Recession, including Old Navy, Foot Locker, Waldenbooks and the Dillard's anchor. The Old Navy space became a family entertainment center called Saturn 5 in 2010.

In May 2012, Simon Property Group (which bought out DeBartolo in 1996) announced plans to sell the mall. In November of that year, Mason Asset Management acquired the mall for $25 million. Macy's announced the closure of its store at the mall in July 2014, as they relocated to the Mall at University Town Center. The theater closed a month later. In 2015, Sears Holdings spun off 235 of its properties, including the Sears at DeSoto Square Mall, into Seritage Growth Properties. Mason Asset Management sold the mall for $25.5 million to New York-based Meyer Lebovitz in March 2017. Lebovitz owned DeSoto Owners LLC. Lebovitz chose Madison Properties USA LLC for the task of redeveloping and leasing the mall. Jerrell M. Davis, president of the Madison Properties Southeast Region, oversaw the project. The mall was used by FEMA as a disaster recovery center after Hurricane Irma hit Florida in September 2017.

In January 2018, Your Treasure House, a retail store and auction house, opened on the first floor of the former Macy's location. In July 2018, it was briefly rebranded as "Midtown DeSoto Square Mall", as part of plans to renovate and expand the mall. When those plans fell apart, the rebranding was dropped. Sears announced on October 15, 2018, that it would be closing as part of a plan to close 142 stores nationwide.

Your Treasure House closed in late 2019 leaving the former Macy's space vacant again. On December 13, 2019, it was announced that the former Sears would be converted to a self-storage facility. The mall went into default on its mortgage on January 20, 2020, and a judgement of foreclosure of $29.3 million was given. JCPenney announced on June 4 that it was closing on October 18 as part of a plan to close 154 stores nationwide which left Hudson's Furniture as the only anchor left. A foreclosure sale was originally scheduled to occur on September 23 but DeSoto Owners LLC filed bankruptcy a day prior to the sale.

On April 29, 2021, it was announced that the mall would officially close the next day, April 30, 2021. At the time of its closure, there were 4 stores operating in the mall. Sometime before the mall's closing, DeSoto Owners LLC filed for bankruptcy again to try to restructure the company's finances and give themselves more time.

In 2021, Go Store It Self Storage, a storage company, opened at the mall inside the former Sears. Go Store It Self Storage utilizes the entire space of the former Sears as a storage facility.

In August 2024, Madison Communities, a subsidiary of Madison Capital Group Holdings LLC, a real estate developer from North Carolina, announced that it had secured a $47 million loan to build an apartment community on its 7.5-acre parcel of the former DeSoto Mall site in Manatee County. Madison Capital Group previously purchased the former Sears anchor building for their Go Store It Self-Storage brand in September 2019.

== Anchors ==
Anchors
Store	Notes
Maas Brothers/Burdines/Macy's	(1973–2014)
Sears	(1973–2019)
Dillard's	(1992–2009)
Belk	(1979–1992)
JCPenney	(1974–2020)
Hudson's Furniture	(2014–present)
Your Treasure House	(2018–2019)
Go Store It Self Storage	(2021-present)
