= Florida Business Centre =

- Location: Melbourne, Florida, U.S.
- Address: 1450 South Babcock Street
- Opened: 1962
- Previous names: Brevard Mall, Florida Marketplace
- Developer: Edward J. DeBartolo Corporation
- Num. of stores: 30+
- Num. of anchor tenants: 2
- Floor area: 318,010 square feet (29,544 m^{2})
- Floors: 1

Florida Business Centre, formerly Florida Marketplace and Brevard Mall, is an enclosed office complex and former shopping mall in Melbourne, Florida, United States. A small, two-anchor mall, it was the first mall in Brevard County, Florida, and was the first mall built by the DeBartolo Corporation in Florida. Tenants of the complex include Percepta, Collins Aerospace, and IHeartMedia.

== History ==
Developed by the Edward J. DeBartolo Corporation, Brevard Mall was announced in 1961. Anchor stores were to include a two-level Montgomery Ward and J. C. Penney, with space for 24 stores in between, at that time to include a McCrory's 5 & 10, a Food Fair, a savings and loan, two women's wear stores, two shoe stores, a men's shop, a restaurant, a child's clothing store, and a jewelry store. Construction for the mall began in early 1962, on a 32-acre site considered part of the Melbourne Airport, and previously housing a television & appliance store, and a miniature golf course. At this time, an opening date of fall 1962 was announced, as well as new tenants including Eckerd Drugs, Winn-Dixie, and Kinney Shoes. Montgomery Ward announced a March 27, 1963 opening by January that year, with its auto center opening ahead of the main store, on March 18, 1963. The mall opened as planned on March 27, 1963, with a mix of national and local tenants.

The mall's Montgomery Ward was converted to Jefferson Ward in 1980, in a $2 million renovation. In 1981, plans were announced to greatly expand the mall; a joint venture by owners Jim Wilson & Associates with Homart Development Company and Mel Sembler Associates, it would add 125 stores to the mall, connecting it to an existing Sears and adding Ivey's as a fourth anchor. Plans collapsed however in March 1981, when anchor J. C. Penney announced it would not be renewing its lease, set to run out in 1983, in order to move to the new Melbourne Square Mall, followed shortly by Ivey's. JCPenney was re-tenanted in late 1984, when HomeOwners Warehouse, a subsidiary of Service Merchandise, renovated and opened in the space. Jefferson Ward anchor folded with the rest of the chain in 1986, and remained vacant until 1988, when Montgomery Ward returned to the mall alongside a $1.25 million renovation by new owners J.J. Gumberg Co. TJ Maxx was announced in 1987, taking over the former Winn-Dixie space as well as a few smaller tenants nearby.

In 1997, as part of their Chapter 11 Bankruptcy filing, Montgomery Ward closed 48 stores, including the location at the Brevard Mall, which closed in August. Also in 1997, the mall underwent renovations into the "Florida Marketplace", a mixed-use center including offices, retail, and a convention center space in the former Montgomery Ward space. By 2013, the complex had continued to house offices, and was renamed again to Florida Business Centre.
