= Countryside Mall =

Shopping mall in Clearwater, Florida

- Location: Clearwater, Florida, United States
- Address: 27001 US Highway 19 North, Suite 1039, Clearwater, FL 33761
- Opened: September 8, 1975; 51 years ago
- Previous names: Countryside Mall (1975–2002); Westfield Shoppingtown Countryside (2002–2005); Westfield Countryside (2005-2020)
- Manager: JLL Properties
- Owner: JLL Properties
- Num. of stores: 157
- Num. of anchor tenants: 6 (at peak)
- Floor area: 1,210,199 sq ft (112,431.2 m^{2})
- Floors: 2 (1 in Whole Foods Market)
- Website: www.countrysidemallfl.com

Countryside Mall (formerly Westfield Countryside) is a shopping mall in Clearwater, Florida. Situated near the coastline on the Gulf Coast, it serves over 9 million customers every year, and is home to five anchor stores, a 12-screen CMX Cinemas, numerous restaurants, and an ice skating rink.

== History ==
Countryside Mall opened on September 8, 1975. Opening anchors included Maas Brothers and Sears, with JCPenney and J. W. Robinson's opening a year later. Out of the four original anchors, only JCPenney currently remains. Sears shrunk for Nordstrom Rack and Whole Foods Market and closed in 2018, Maas Brothers is now a Macy's (formerly Burdines), and J. W. Robinson's is now a Dillard's (formerly Maison Blanche). A six-screen movie theater was built next to the mall across from JCPenney. However, declining attendance led it to close in 2000. It has since become a Crunch Fitness center.

In 2002, as part of their expansion into the United States, Westfield Group acquired Countryside Mall in a $4.8 billion deal that involved 13 other shopping centers. The mall was renamed "Westfield Countryside" by the new owners, dropping the "Shoppingtown" name in June 2005.

In April 2009, work for a $12 million renovation project began. The mall's interior look was completely updated with new relocated escalators, new flooring and ceilings, additional skylights, an expanded children's play area, and a completely redesigned food court. Dozens of planters and fake columns were removed, and an entourage of new stores were brought to the mall. The renovations were completed in November 2009.

In December 2011, Countryside Cobb-12 Cinema was added to the 2nd level of the mall. In 2012, Westfield Countryside also added Bar Louie, BJ's Brewhouse & Restaurant, Grimaldi's Coal Fired Pizzeria, and Red Robin Gourmet Burgers. In 2013, PF Chang's China Bistro was added to finish out "Restaurant Row".

Pinellas County's first and only Whole Foods Market opened in September 2014 on the first floor's western portion of the Sears space.

In 2015, Sears Holdings spun off 235 of its properties, including the Sears at Westfield Countryside, into Seritage Growth Properties.

In late 2015, Nordstrom Rack opened their first and only Pinellas County location at Westfield Countryside in the former Sears Auto Center.

On April 23, 2018, Sears announced that its store would be closing as part of a plan to close 42 stores nationwide. The store closed on July 15, 2018.

In 2021, the mall faced foreclosure after the mall’s owner, Unibail-Rodamco-Westfield, had failed to make payments on the property’s mortgage loans. This resulted in the reversion of the mall’s name from ‘Westfield Countryside’ back to ‘Countryside Mall’.

In 2025, it was announced that Target had purchased the upper floor of the former Sears anchor space and plans to open a two-story store in the space by 2027. As of 2026, the store is currently under construction.

== Restaurants ==
- BJ's Restaurant & Brewhouse
- Charleys Philly Steaks
- The Cheesecake Factory
- P.F. Chang's
- Red Robin
- Sarku Japan
