= Edison Mall =

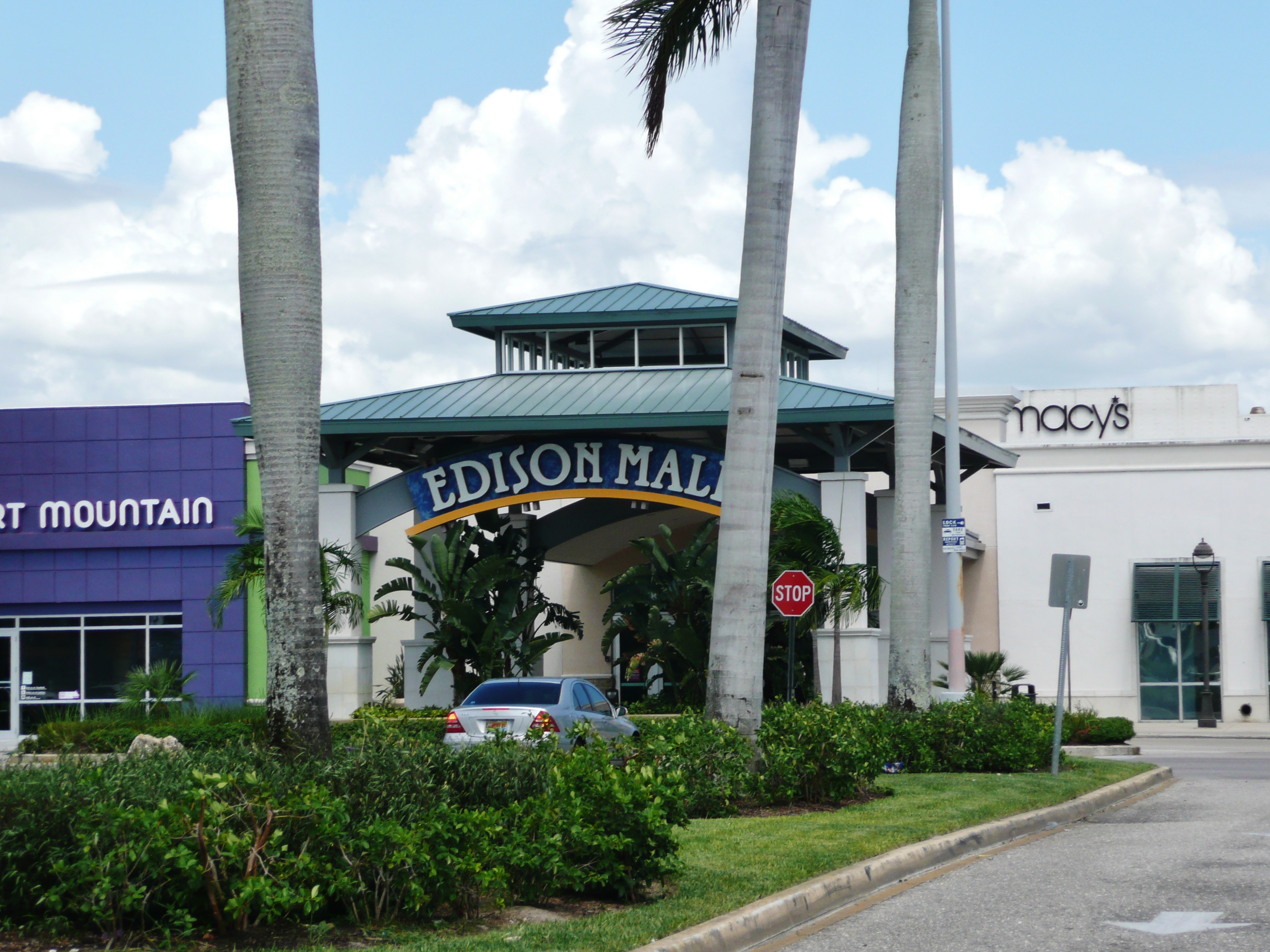
- Location: Fort Myers, Florida, United States
- Coordinates: 26.601881°N 81.868972°W
- Address: 4125 S Cleveland Avenue
- Opened: 1965
- Developer: George Sanders
- Manager: CBRE
- Num. of stores: 133
- Num. of anchor tenants: 5 (4 open, 1 being redeveloped)
- Floor area: 1,051,000 sq ft (97,600 m^{2})
- Floors: 1 (2 in Dillard's, JCPenney, and both Macy's locations)

Edison Mall is an enclosed, super-regional shopping mall in Fort Myers, Florida. The mall opened in 1965, and has been expanded three times since. Edison Mall was owned by Washington Prime Group, which took over the mall in 2014 until 2026. The mall is named for inventor Thomas Edison, who owned a winter residence and laboratory in Fort Myers. The mall's anchors are Dillard's, JCPenney, and two Macy's stores; it also includes 133 stores and a lifestyle center section. The mall itself is situated on just one floor, but all of the anchor stores (except for the former Sears) have two floors.

== History ==
=== 1960s-1974: Planning, construction, and early years ===
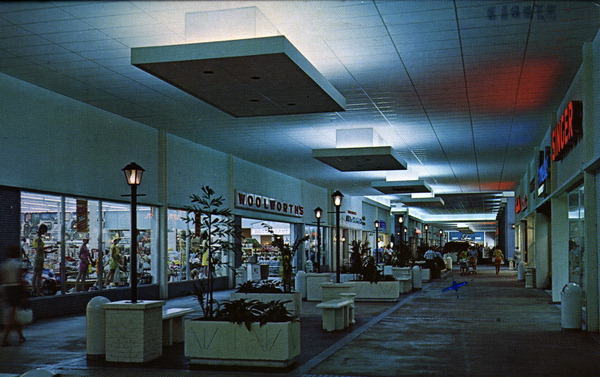

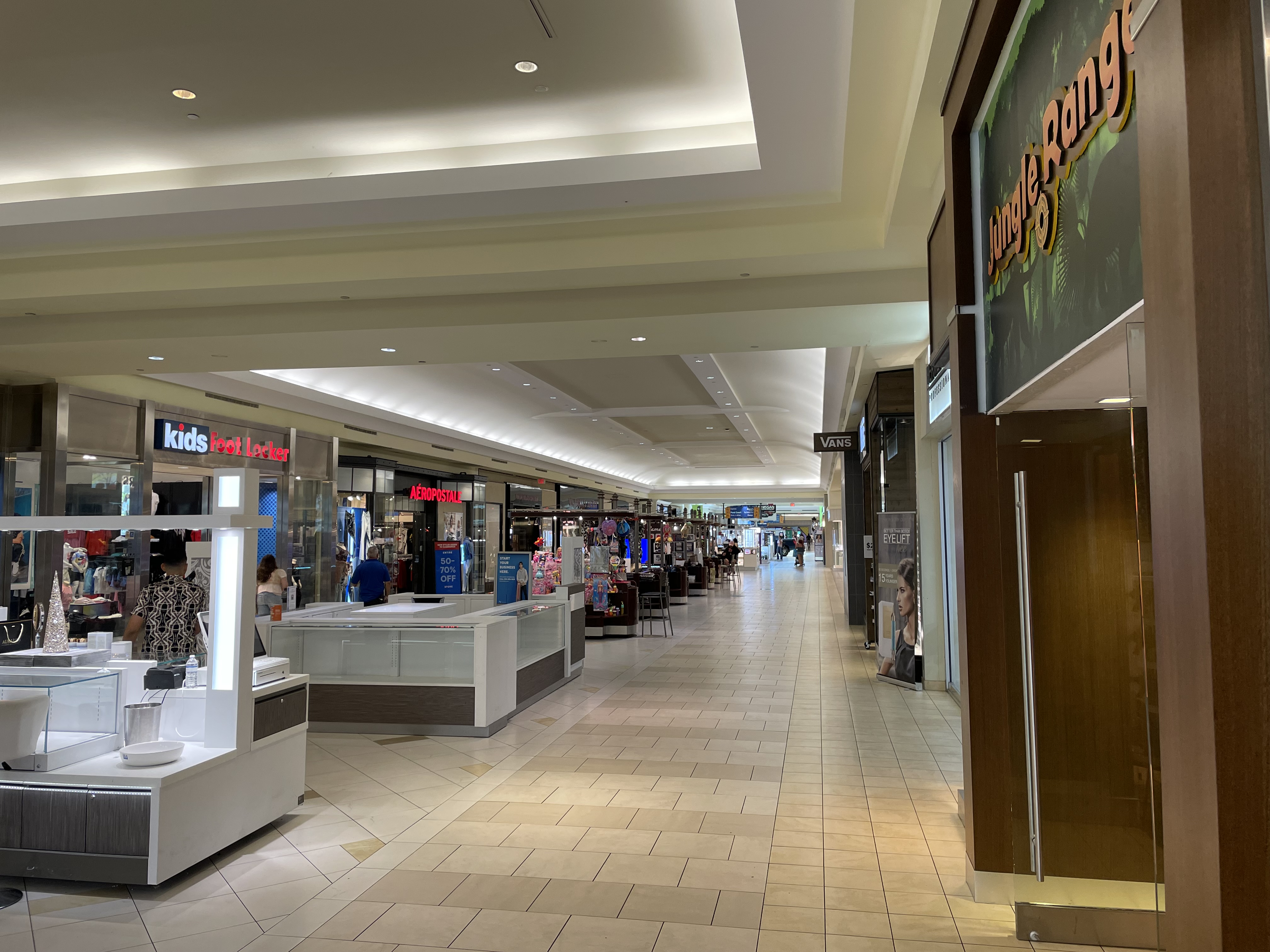
Interior of the mall as seen in the 1960s (top) and in 2022 (bottom)

The Edison Mall was developed in the early 1960s by George Sanders, who got the idea for an indoor shopping mall in Fort Myers when he heard that Sears and JCPenney were seeking to relocate their Downtown Fort Myers stores to larger locations. JCPenney had been operating downtown in the Langford Building since 1934, and Sears store was located across the street in the Heitman Building.

Sanders purchased property that was previously a strawberry field for the mall on the northeast corner of U.S. Route 41 and Colonial Boulevard on the south side of Fort Myers. At the time, US 41 was only two lanes wide, and the only other businesses in the area were a Publix supermarket and a drive-in theater, (which later became the site of a Kmart store, and is now a Floor & Decor).

The Edison Mall was initially anchored by Sears, JCPenney, and Maas Brothers, a Tampa-based department store. Sears opened first on October 28, 1964, opening before the rest of the mall. Maas Brothers opened on October 8, 1965, along with the first interior segment of the mall. JCPenney opened on March 17, 1966, which completed the original plan for the mall. The mall's opening would lead to more commercial development south of downtown Fort Myers.

The Edison Mall would be the first time in the United States that rivals JCPenney and Sears were co-located in the same shopping center, and the stores were at opposite end of the mall's original segment. The Maas Brothers store was in the middle of the mall and was notable since it was their first store to anchor an enclosed shopping mall. They had previously only operated freestanding stores in downtown areas. Maas Brothers would later go on to open more locations in malls on Florida's Gulf Coast with their next mall stores opening at WestShore Plaza and Tyrone Square Mall. The two-story Maas Brothers also contained the first escalators in the city of Fort Myers. As with their previous stores, Maas Brothers operated a Suncoast Restaurant within the store on the second floor. The Edison Mall also notably included a Walgreens and a Woolworth's five-and-dime store in its early days.

=== 1974-1980s: Expansion ===
The mall was renovated in 1977, and the three anchors were expanded within the decade. Maas Brothers added additional space to the back of their store in 1974, and Sears doubled the size of their store in 1977. JCPenney added a second floor to their store in 1979.

The mall underwent its first major expansion in 1979. This expansion was centered around a new fourth anchor, Miami-based Burdines, on the southeast corner. Burdines had been considering four possible locations for a store in Fort Myers in the 1970s and one of the considered locations was at a large regional mall proposed by the Edward J. DeBartolo Corporation to be located at US 41 and Daniels Road (this mall was never built and is now partially the site of the Bell Tower Shops). Burdines ultimately selected the Edison Mall for its Fort Myers location and the store opened on August 2, 1979. The Burdines store was a two-story building with the ability to add a third level if needed, and it included a large warehouse-style atrium in the center (which was a unique design for Burdines at the time). New mall corridors were built from JCPenney to Burdines and from Burdines to Maas Brothers, giving Maas Brothers a second mall entrance.

As the 1979 expansion was under construction, George Sanders sold the mall to Aster Properties, and a food court was built near Sears in 1981.

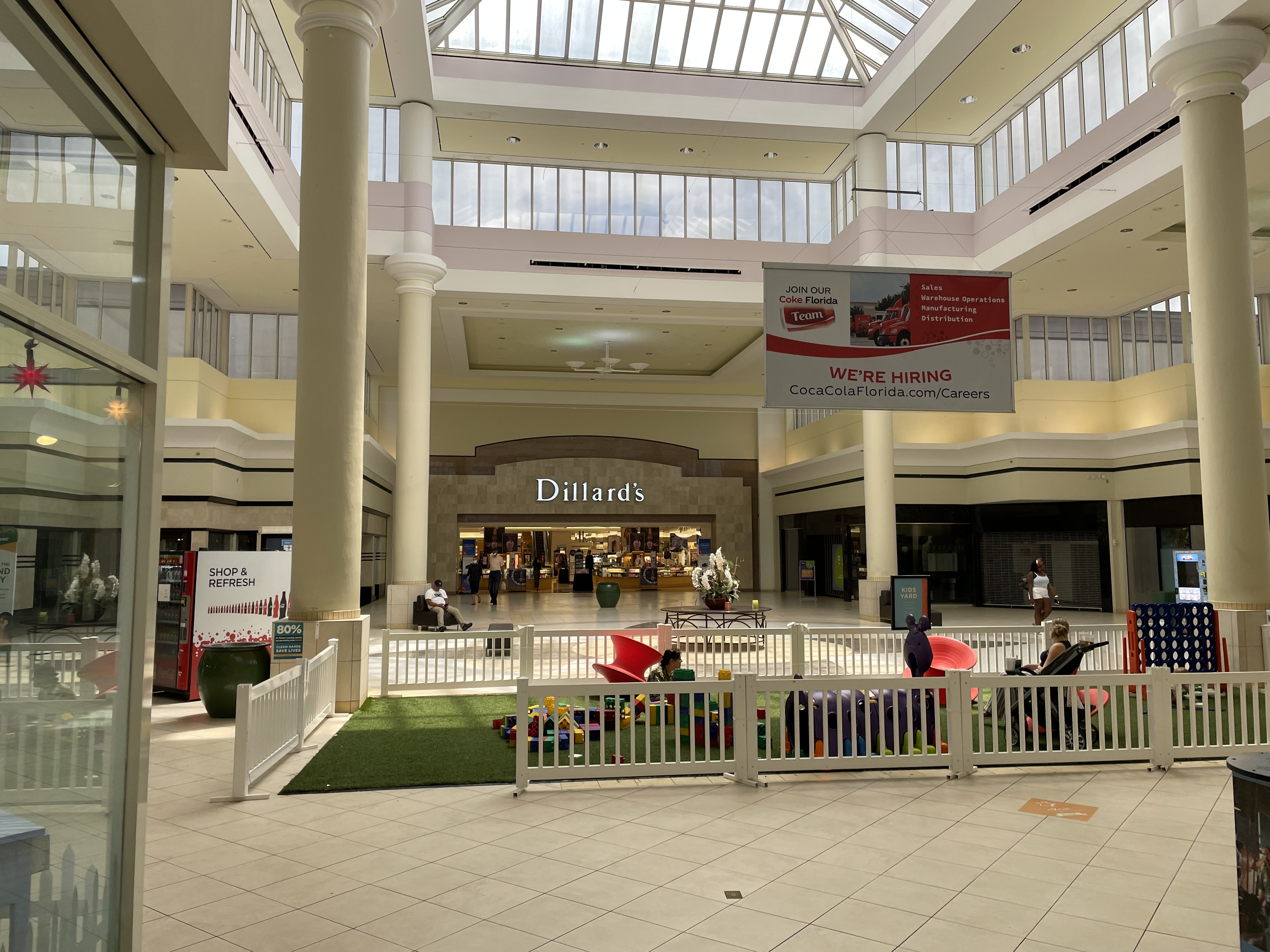
Atrium in front of Dillard's

The mall underwent an additional expansion in 1985. This expansion included additional mall space and a fifth anchor, Robinson's of Florida, the Florida division of California-based J.W. Robinsons. Robinson's only lasted two years before its Florida stores were sold to Maison Blanche, a New Orleans–based department store, in 1987. The store was officially rebranded as Maison Blanche on March 28, 1988. In August 1991, Maison Blanche sold its Edison Mall location and six others on the Gulf Coast of Florida to Dillard's which still operates at the mall today. Dillard's was expanded and remodeled in 1999.

=== Since the 1990s: Later years ===
Also in 1991, Edison Mall's two Florida-based anchors, Maas Brothers and Burdines were merged under the Burdines nameplate by their parent company. The company retained both locations at the Edison Mall and the Maas Brothers store was officially rebranded as Burdines on October 20, 1991. The former Maas Brothers became Burdines' women's store while the original Burdines location contained their men's, kids, and home departments. Both Burdines locations were remodeled in 1994. Along with the rest of the Burdines chain, the two locations at Edison Mall were renamed Burdines-Macy's on January 30, 2004, as the brands were merged by their parent company. On March 6, 2005, the Burdines name was officially dropped and the stores were fully merged into Macy's. Macy's still operates both Edison Mall locations today.

Simon Property Group announced a further renovation of the mall in 2005, which added an outdoor lifestyle center wing and renovated the interior.

In 2015, Sears Holdings spun off 235 of its properties, including the Sears at Edison Mall, into Seritage Growth Properties.

In late 2017, a new wing was opened within the mall connecting two existing corridors. The new wing was part of a $4 million renovation and was designed to shorten the distance between the two ends of the mall.

On February 2, 2020, Sears closed its Edison Mall location after 55 years of operation. The store was last Sears store to close in Southwest Florida after its locations at Coastland Center and the Port Charlotte Town Center in Naples and Port Charlotte respectively closed in 2018.

In early 2021, the Lee County Government with the Florida Department of Health briefly operated a COVID-19 vaccination site in the former Sears location. In 2021, Spirit Halloween occupied a former Love Culture store which later became a pop-up Christmas Tree Shops location in November. Christmas Tree Shops has since closed.

On June 12, 2022, the mall was closed due to a water break but reopened a day later; it would again close and reopen for similar reasons on March 19, 2024.

Since Sears has closed, the building has been undergoing plans to convert the space into apartments along with some retail uses.
