= Melbourne Square (mall) =

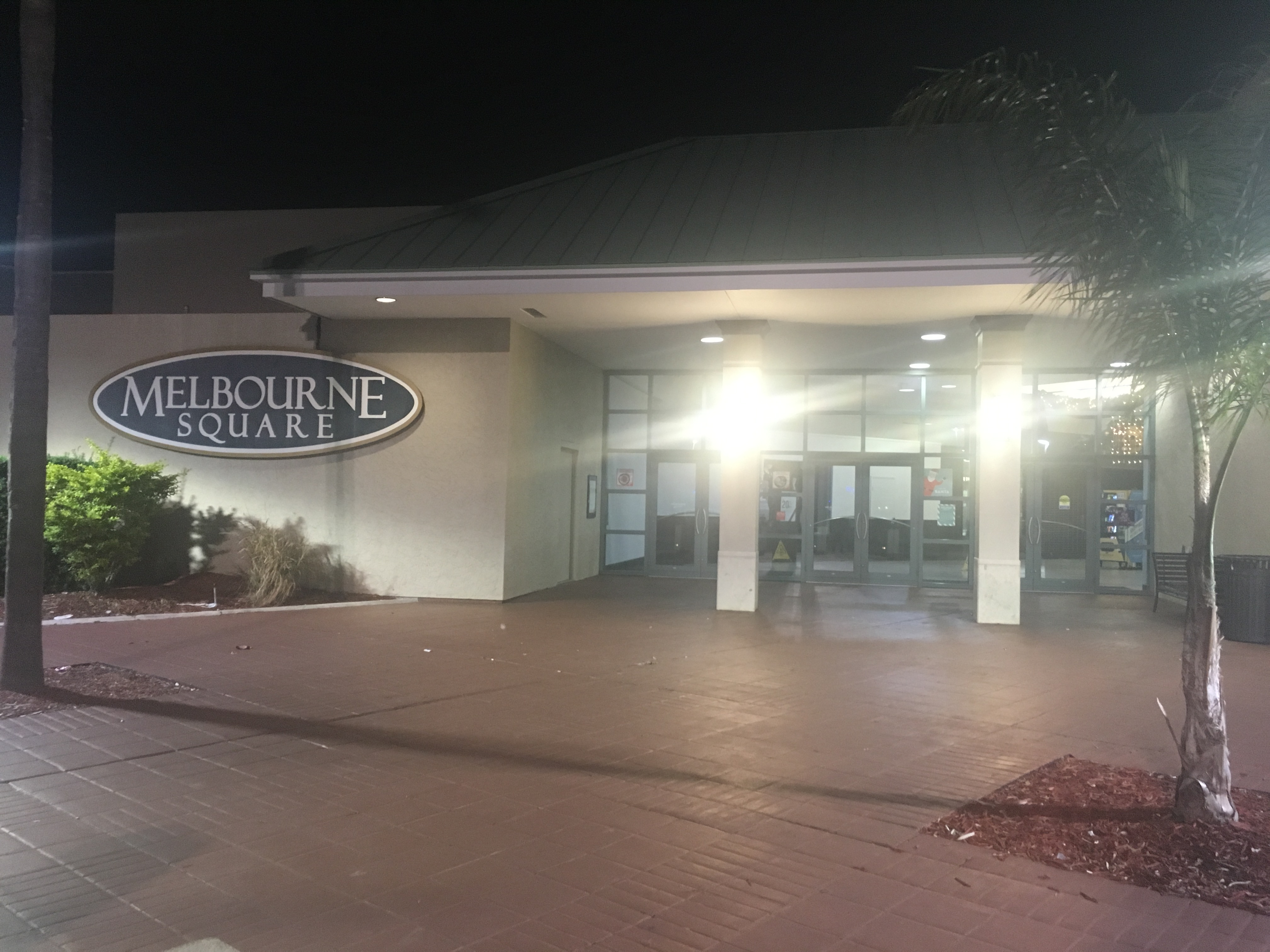
- Mall, December 2019
- Location: Melbourne, Florida, United States
- Coordinates: 28.0817°N 80.65°W
- Address: 1700 W. New Haven Avenue
- Opened: 1982
- Developer: Edward J. DeBartolo Corporation
- Owner: Second Horizon Capital
- Num. of anchor tenants: 5
- Floor area: 703,000 sq ft (65,300 m^{2})
- Floors: 1
- Public transit: SCAT bus: 20, 21, 24, 25, 28
- Website: melbournesquare.com

Melbourne Square is an enclosed shopping mall in Melbourne, Florida. Opened in 1982, it is anchored by two Dillard's stores, J. C. Penney, Macy's, and Dick's Sporting Goods.

== History ==
The mall was built on what had formerly been an orange grove. It was the second mall in Melbourne, after Brevard Mall in 1962.

The first store to open at Melbourne Square in 1982 was Ivey's. The other anchors that opened later are Jordan Marsh, Burdine's, JCPenney, and Belk.

In 1990, Ivey's became the mall's first Dillard's. Jordan Marsh closed in 1991 and became the first Florida location for Mervyn's the following year. The Mervyn's store closed and became a second Dillard's in 1997. The mall is currently managed by Second Horizon Capital.

In 2003, Macy's took over the mall's Burdine's store, which became Burdines-Macy's until 2005 when it became Macy's. Belk moved to The Avenue in Viera in 2004. The former Belk building was torn down in 2006 for Dick's Sporting Goods and Circuit City, the latter of which went out of business in 2009. The former Circuit City space operated as a World Of Decor store before becoming LA Fitness in 2014, with H&M joining the same year.

An annual Hanukkah menorah parade takes place near the mall in association with the local branch of the Chabad-Lubavitch movement.

In March 2026, as the previous mall owners, Washington Prime Group filed for Chapter 11 bankruptcy in 2021 and in process of liquidating, the mall was sold to Second Horizon Capital, with plans to transform the property.

== Incidents ==
On January 17, 2015, one person was killed and one was wounded in a shooting inside the mall food court before the gunman José Garcia Rodriguez committed suicide. The event was believed to be a domestic violence-related incident.

On December 13, 2016, a gun was fired during an attempted robbery in the mall's parking lot.
