= McAllister Hotel =

Former hotel in Miami, Florida, United States

Coordinates: 25.774921°N 80.18804°W

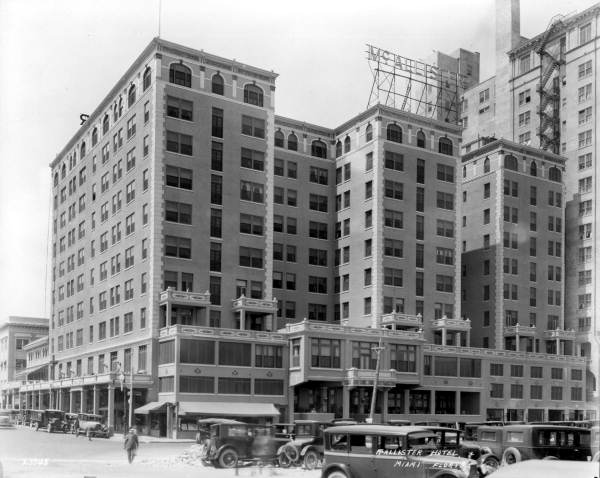
Photograph of the McAllister Hotel in 1926 courtesy of the Florida Photographic Collection

The McAllister Hotel was a ten-story high-rise hotel in Downtown Miami, Florida. It opened on December 31, 1919, and until 1925, was the tallest building in Miami. It was demolished in 1988, and the site is now the home to 50 Biscayne built in 2007 at 554 feet (169 m). The McAllister Hotel is considered one of Miami's first skyscrapers and was a city icon until its demolition. It was designed by Walter De Garmo. The architect was Frank Valentine Newell. For many years, the McAllister was the home of radio station WQAM, one of Miami's classic top 40 stations. It was also the Baltimore Orioles' spring training headquarters from 1959 to 1971.

Records
Preceded by Ralston Building	Tallest Building in Miami; 1917–1925; N/A	Succeeded by Freedom Tower
