= Tampa Bay Center =

Defunct mall in Tampa, Florida, U.S.

Coordinates: 27.9790°N 82.4984°W

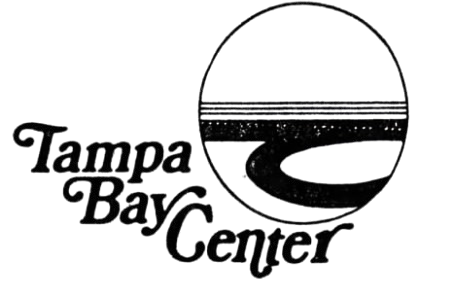

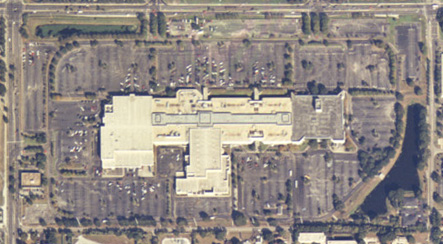
- Aerial view (December 1999)
- Location: Tampa, Florida, U.S.
- Address: 3302 W. Dr. Martin Luther King Jr. Blvd
- Opened: August 5, 1976; 50 years ago
- Closed: 2002; 24 years ago
- Demolished: 2005
- Developer: The Rouse Company
- Owner: Malcolm Glazer
- Num. of stores: 100+ (at peak)
- Num. of anchor tenants: 3 (at peak)
- Floor area: 877,000 square feet (81,500 m^{2})
- Floors: 2
- Website: Official website at the Wayback Machine (archived 2000-08-29)

Tampa Bay Center was a shopping mall located in Tampa, Florida, across the street from Tampa Stadium. The mall was developed by the Rouse Company. When it opened on August 5, 1976 the 877,000-square-foot (81,500 m^{2}) Tampa Bay Center was Tampa's fourth major mall and operated until 2001, when most of its tenants relocated to the nearby International Plaza. The mall was a two-story building that had an anchor at each end, plus one in the center of the mall: Burdines on the east side, Montgomery Ward in the center, and Sears on the west side.

== Appearance ==
Tampa Bay Center's main corridor was splashed in sunlight, a large portion of the roof was actually constructed with skylights; a bright and sunny day outdoors meant a bright and sunny day indoors. This was considered to be an inviting feature at a time when many malls were being built with dropped ceilings and finished with darker colors. The mall featured exposed, light-colored truss ceilings over the main corridor, tan-brown floor tiles, floor-based water fountains, and trees intermittently planted on the bottom floor of the main corridor, growing upwards toward the skylights. The open-and-airy interior was further augmented by what was thought to be one of the mall's most important trademarks, a glass elevator located in the center of the mall. The North Side parking lot had an unusual-for-flat-central-Florida slope to it that meant that the mall entrance on that side of the building was on the second floor, leading directly into the food court, which opened in 1987.

In the 1990s, the mall's center court featured a 1922 Herschell-Spillman carousel with carved wooden horses, with the oldest horse carved in 1880. Discovered in a West Tampa warehouse by Lynne Beckett and Tommy Sciortino, the couple invested $100,000 into its restoration. The carousel's Wurlitzer band organ was replaced with taped music, and its canvas top was removed so shoppers upstairs could see in.

== Cinema ==
The mall featured a cinema with two screens from the beginning until it closed on February 28, 1990. The final movies shown were Roger & Me and Stella. Throughout its history, it was operated by the General Cinema Corporation.

== Montgomery Ward ==
Due to the success of the mall, a third anchor, Montgomery Ward, was proposed in November 1977; the third anchor pad on the south side of the facility had been planned since the center's opening. It opened in October 1980.

== Decline and closure ==
In 1994, the mall's management was accused of racism for closing early during the Florida Classic college football game between FAMU and Bethune Cookman, both historically black universities. Then Montgomery Ward was closed in 1999, and the Burdines followed soon afterwards, moving to the new Citrus Park Town Center mall northwest of Tampa. Tampa Bay Center hung on with only Sears, but then International Plaza opened nearby in 2001. International Plaza had lured Dillard's away from WestShore Plaza, and in early 2002, Sears moved into the old Dillard's location. Tampa Bay Center closed entirely after that.

== New owner and demolition ==
The mall was acquired by Malcolm Glazer and his family for $22.8 million in cash on December 31, 2002, to make way for a training facility for the Tampa Bay Buccaneers. It was demolished in 2005.

The only remnants of the mall are the large sections of parking lots. The Hillsborough Area Regional Transit bus terminal was relocated to the southwest section of the property in 2007, known as the West Tampa Transfer Center. The transfer center portion is still owned by agency, but was largely rendered inoperable as of 2017 due to a system-wide network reorganization known as Mission MAX.
