= Gingiss Formalwear =

American formalwear chain

- Industry: Men's formal wear
- Founded: 1936
- Founder: Benjamin J. Gingiss
- Defunct: 2003
- Fate: Acquired by The May Department Stores Company
- Number of locations: 13 (1967); 15 (1968); 160 (1980); 230 (1991); 402 (2003)
- Subsidiaries: Gary's Tux Shop

Gingiss Formalwear, formerly Gingiss Brothers, was a chain of stores specializing in the sale and rental of men's formal wear in the United States, from 1936 to 2003.

== History ==
The chain began as Gingiss Brothers in 1936, headquartered in Chicago, Illinois. By 1967, the chain had grown to a total of 13 stores. By this time, the chain had begun advertising as simply "gingiss" In August 1968, the chain, which at this point had 15 stores in and around Chicago, announced that it planned to have 101 franchised stores operating throughout the country within 19 months. By 1975, the chain had expanded to over 100 stores and 160 by 1980. The chain had further grown by 1991, with a total of 230 stores nationwide. In 1985, the company was sold by the Gingiss family to Mesirow Financial Services, who later sold it to a group of investors including the Boston-based Beta Partners, Barry Snyder, head of Tuxedo Junction, and Michael J. Corrao, president of Gingiss Formalwear, in 1991. That same year, the company merged with the Buffalo, New York based Tuxedo Junction, which had 32 stores. In 2003, Gingiss Formalwear, with 236 company owned stores and 166 franchised stores, filed for Chapter 11 bankruptcy. In late 2003, The May Department Stores Company purchased 125 company-owned stores. Several franchised stores converted to other brands, including 14 in Atlanta and at least 3 in Wisconsin, to Savvi stores.
