= WestShore Plaza =

Coordinates: 27°56′47″N 82°31′35″W

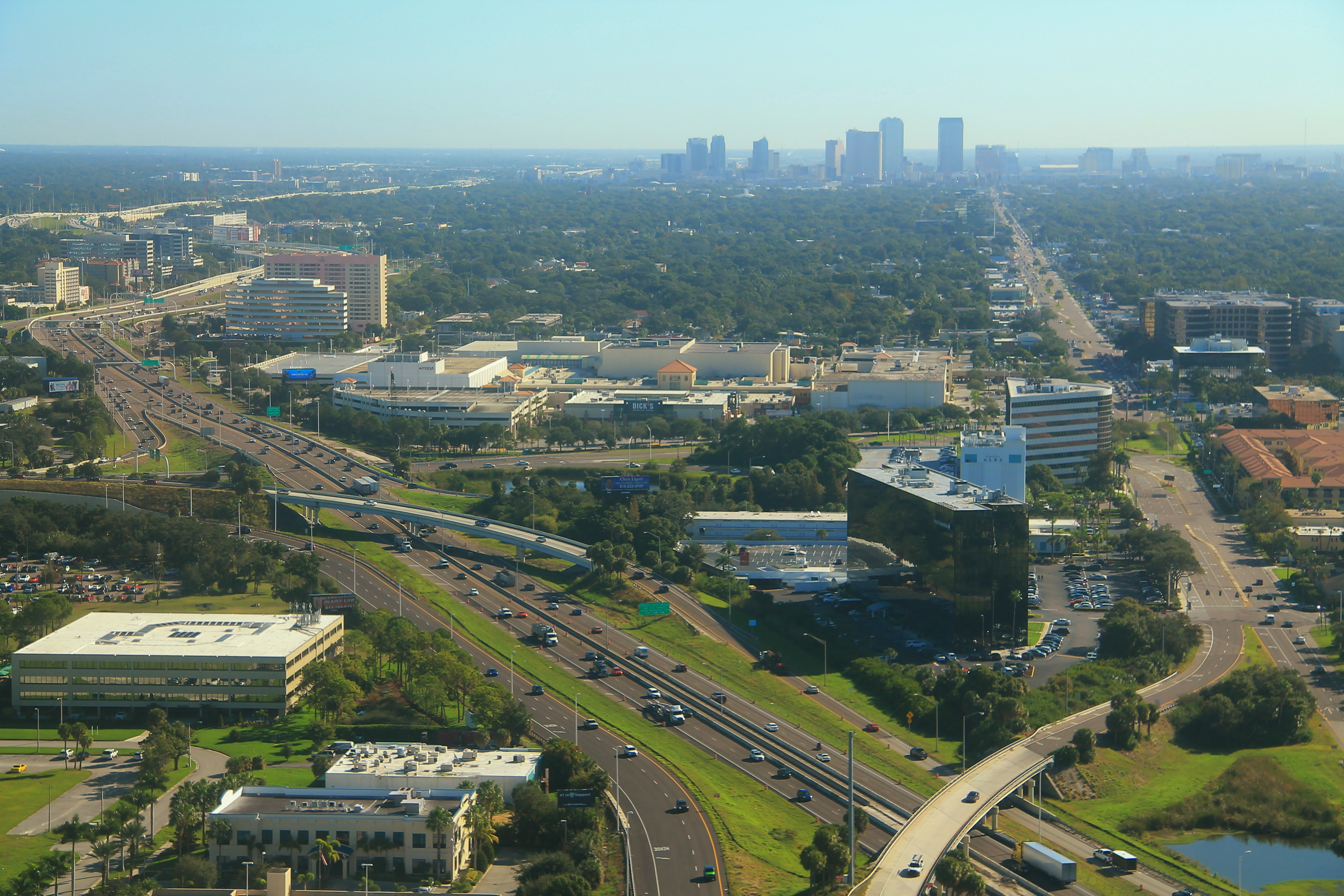
- Aerial view of the mall, 2019
- Location: Tampa, Florida, U.S.
- Opened: September 28, 1967; 59 years ago
- Developer: Sydney N. Greenberg Jr. and Theodore W. Berenson
- Manager: CBRE
- Owner: Third Lake Partners
- Num. of stores: 115
- Num. of anchor tenants: 5 (2 open, 2 vacant, 1 under construction)
- Floor area: 1,059,525 sq ft (98,433.1 m^{2})
- Floors: 1 with partial second level (2 in anchors)
- Parking: Available on-site
- Website: WestShore Plaza

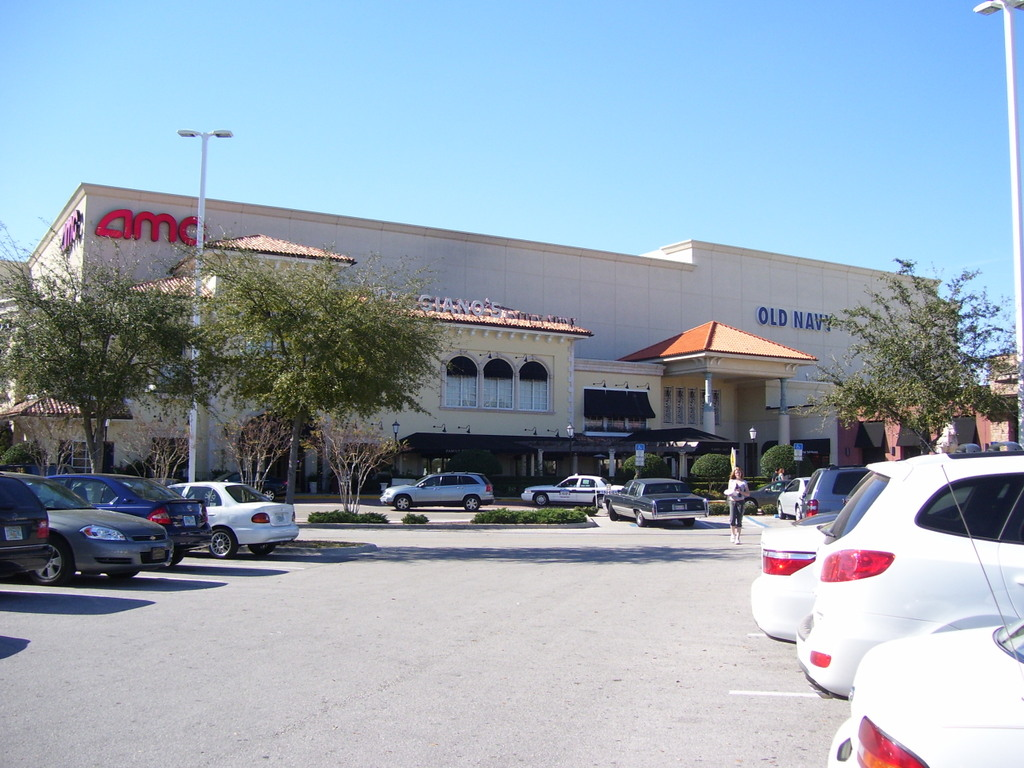
The southeast entrance to the mall, 2008

WestShore Plaza is a shopping mall located in the Westshore business district of Tampa, Florida, developed by Albert L. Manley of Boston, MA. WestShore Plaza was opened in 1967 and was touted as Tampa's first shopping center that was fully air-conditioned. WestShore houses many specialty shops including Francesca's Collection, LOFT, New Balance, H&M, Old Navy, Sunglass Hut, and more. The property is owned and managed by Washington Prime Group.

The mall's anchors are JCPenney and an AMC movie theater. One anchor tenant is currently under construction and set to open as Wolf Gym in the former Dick’s sporting Goods space. There are also two vacant anchors last occupied by Sears and Macy's. Restaurants include P.F. Chang's China Bistro, Grimaldi's Pizzeria, Irish 31, the Bay Area's only Maggiano's Little Italy, Seasons 52 and there is also a kids play area near JCPenney. A nursing room can be found in the women's restroom and baby changing stations in all restrooms.

== History ==
Westshore Plaza opened on September 28, 1967, as the Tampa Bay area's first enclosed shopping mall.

The mall's first anchor was Maas Brothers, which actually opened a year before the rest of the mall on October 28, 1966, featuring the Suncoast Room Restaurant on the third floor. The store, which was built to complement their flagship store in downtown Tampa, became their second to be located in a shopping mall a year later (their first was at the Edison Mall in Fort Myers), and they later went on to open more mall stores on Florida's Gulf Coast.

JCPenney opened on September 7, 1967, as a second anchor and only original anchor remaining today. It opened along with the first mall segment between it and Maas Brothers, which was dedicated a month later. Like Edison Mall, the center most notably included a Woolworth's five-and-dime store upon its opening, but also featured Walgreens and a Pantry Pride grocery store.

The mall was expanded for the first time with a northeast wing in 1974 along with the north parking garage and a third anchor, Robinson's, which sold its Florida stores to Maison Blanche in 1987, which in turn then sold its store and six others on the West Coast of Florida to Dillard's in 1991. Dillard’s then moved to the upscale International Plaza and Bay Street a mile away. Sears took over the site after moving from Tampa Bay Center in 2002, which closed as a result. Sears announced on December 28 that the store would be among 80 stores to shutter nationwide in March 2019.

Also in 1991, Maas Brothers was merged with Miami-based Burdines, which in turn was renamed Burdines-Macy's in 2003, dropping the Burdines name two years later.

WestShore Plaza was acquired by the Grosvenor Group in 1990, which led to a large renovation to the mall. The mall interior was remodeled with a more Spanish-Mediterranean style interior with a three-story bell tower built over the center court.

Saks Fifth Avenue opened on the west end of the mall along with a third expansion on November 12, 1998, but closed in 2013 and became a flagship Dick's Sporting Goods in 2014. In March 2014, the Palm restaurant closed after more than a dozen years in business at the WestShore Plaza. The fourth and most recent expansion in 2000 involved relocating the food court east into the former Pantry Pride building and a new west wing of mall space with a 14-screen AMC Theatres on the second level.

On June 4, 2020, JCPenney announced that it would be closing as part of a plan to close 154 stores nationwide. However, the store was removed from the list on June 24, 2020 along with 17 other stores so it would remain open for now.

In 2024, Dick's Sporting Goods closed and relocated to International Plaza and Bay Street. On January 9, 2025, it was announced that Macy's store would be closing as part of a plan to close 66 stores nationwide. After Dick’s Sporting Goods closed, a gym known as Divine Iron Gym attempted to open in the space of the former Dick’s Sporting Goods but the gym’s owners ran out of money and couldn’t open the gym. As a result, the uncompleted gym was sold to Wolf Gyms who plans to complete and open the gym. The gym is currently under construction.

In April 2025, it was announced that Washington Prime Group would put all of its properties including the WestShore Plaza up for sale. CBRE would take over management of all of Washington Prime Group’s properties sometime in 2026.

In July 2026, Washington Prime Group sold the mall the WestShore Plaza to Third Lake Partners.

== Future ==
In 2024, the Tampa City Council approved a plan to redevelop the mall site. The property is to include residential units, office space, a hotel or motel, a recreational facility, a Hillsborough Area Regional Transit transfer bus station, as well as retail and restaurant space. The mall's current owner, Washington Prime Group, has not announced a timeline for construction of the redevelopment. Under the plan, the Macy's store was to remain in place with the rest of the current mall being torn down, but the Macy's closed on March 23, 2025.
