= Ralston Building =

- U.S. Historic district – Contributing property
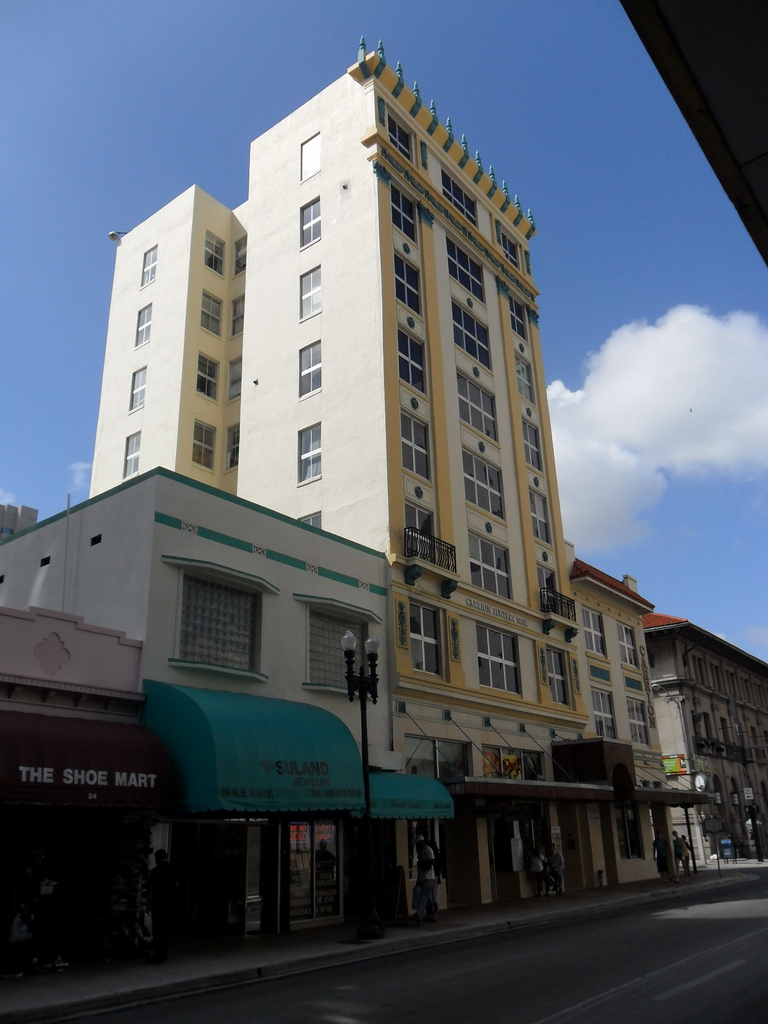
- Ralston Building

- Location within Miami Location within Florida Location within the United States
- Location: 40 Northwest 1st Ave. Downtown, Miami, Florida
- Coordinates: 25°46′29.9526″N 80°11′31.4916″W
- Architectural style: Moderne, Classical Revival, Art Deco, Mediterranean Revival
- Part of: Downtown Miami Historic District (ID05001356)
- Added to NRHP: December 6, 2005

The Ralston Building, now known as the Carrion Jewelry Center, is a historic building located in Downtown Miami. At the time of its completion in 1917, the eight-story building was the tallest building in Miami, a title it held for less than one year when it was surpassed by the McAllister Hotel, built later in 1917. In 2001, it was purchased by First & First Investments, a company owned by local jeweler Juan Perez-Carrion. He purchased the building as the headquarters for Carrion Jewelry Manufacturing. Over the course of 3 years he restored the dilapidated building to its former grandeur. The building is located at 40 Northeast 1st Avenue and is now used for office space.

== See also ==
- List of tallest buildings in Miami#Timeline of tallest buildings

Records
Preceded by Burdine's Department Store	Tallest building in Miami; 1917	Succeeded by McAllister Hotel
