= Gateway Town Center =

- Location: Jacksonville, Florida, United States
- Coordinates: 30.369480°N 81.665782°W
- Address: 5000-7 Norwood Ave
- Opened: 1959 (Plaza) 1967 (Mall)
- Closed: 2012 (Mall)
- Manager: Gateway Retail Center LLC
- Owner: Gator Investments
- Num. of stores: 34
- Num. of anchor tenants: 3
- Floor area: 700,000 sq ft (65,000 m^{2})
- Floors: 1 (2 in former JCPenney)
- Parking: Surrounding sectional; free
- Website: gatewaytownctr.com

Gateway Town Center (commonly called Gateway Mall or Gateway) is an outdoor shopping center (formerly an indoor Shopping Mall) located in the Jacksonville, Florida neighborhood of Brentwood, just off Interstate 95 (exit 355 and 356) at Golfair Boulevard and Norwood Avenue. Developed in the 1950s, it has 34 stores, and is anchored by Winn Dixie, Burlington and Roses.

The mall originally consisted of a strip center with Food Fair, G. C. Murphy, J. C. Penney, Winn Dixie, and W. T. Grant (later May-Cohen's). A 1967 expansion added the enclosed mall, anchored by a new JCPenney store and Montgomery Ward, later Zayre.

== History and recent activity ==
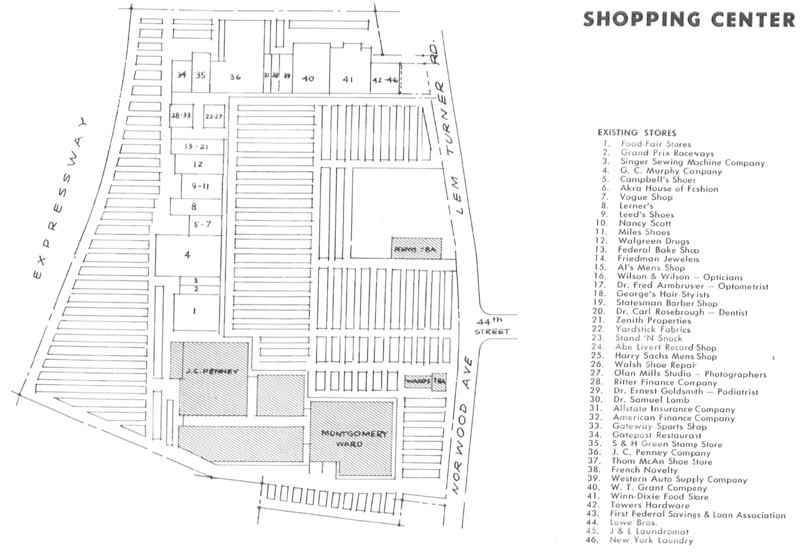
Gateway Mall map before opening

In 1967 the mall would receive an indoor expansion. This expansion would add a Montgomery Ward, a new Penneys building, and more inline stores. Some of those inline stores included Foot Locker, Orange Julius, Morrison's Cafeteria, and Strawberry Fields

In 2000, Publix was built adding a new grocery store to the mall.

The original Shopping Mall was closed in 2012

On October 28, 2019 Publix announced they would close the Gateway store leaving the center without an anchor. On November 26 Winn Dixie was approved into the Publix spot (Publix had not moved and Closed on December 28, 2019.) On February 12, 2020 Winn Dixie reopened in the former Publix store. Roses would open up a store at the center in 2022 in the former JCPenney store in the plaza side. In 2023 Burlington would open its doors in the former Grants building. Five Below would Also open its doors in 2023 in the former Winn-Dixie building. In 2024 it was announced that Dollar tree would fill the other half of the former Winn-Dixie building.

On November 1st 2024, Hibbett would move out from the mall-side JCPenney and relocate into the plaza. Rainbow would also relocate in 2025 from the closed mall to the plaza. After Hibbett relocated an Extra Space Storage would open in the former JCPenney.
