= JLL =

JLL may refer to:

- JLL Partners, a private equity firm, formerly Joseph Littlejohn & Levy
- JLL (company), global real estate company, formerly Jones Lang LaSalle, with NYSE ticker "JLL"
- Jangan Lupa Lirik!, a Malaysian quiz show
- JetKonnect, Indian airline with ICAO designator "JLL"
- Jerry Lee Lewis (1935–2022), American musician
- New York University Journal of Law & Liberty, an American Law journal
