= Maas Brothers =

Department store founded by Abe and Isaac Maas in 1886 in Tampa, Florida, U.S.

- Type: Department store
- Industry: Retail
- Founded: 1886; 140 years ago
- Defunct: 1991; 35 years ago
- Fate: Merged into Burdines
- Successor: Burdines (1991–2005); Macy's (2005–present)
- Headquarters: Tampa, Florida

Maas Brothers was a leading Tampa, Florida, department store founded by Abe and Isaac Maas in 1886 that grew from a small 23-by-90-foot (7.0 by 27.4 m) store to a chain of 39 stores throughout the Gulf Coast of Florida. The Maas Brothers brand went defunct in 1991 when it was consolidated into the Burdines department store chain, which in turn merged with Macy's in 2005.

== History ==
Abe and Isaac Maas started their retail career in Cochran, Georgia, working with their brothers, Jacob and Sol. By 1880, Abe was operating a store in Dublin, Georgia, and Isaac was operating a millinery store in Ocala by 1885. In 1886, Abe decided to move to a better location and chose Tampa, at the time a small village on Florida's west coast. Abe had been quoted as saying, "It's a waterfront town. Who knows? It may amount to something someday." Abe Maas opened the Dry Goods Palace on December 10, 1886. His brother, Isaac, formally joined his brother on September 15, 1887, and the store became Maas Brothers. After outgrowing its first two locations, Maas Brothers opened its third, and largest, store in 1921. This store was the second largest department store in Florida, and it contained the first escalator installed in Florida. By 1929, Maas Brothers dominated Florida's West Coast. It was known as "Greater Tampa's Greatest Store."

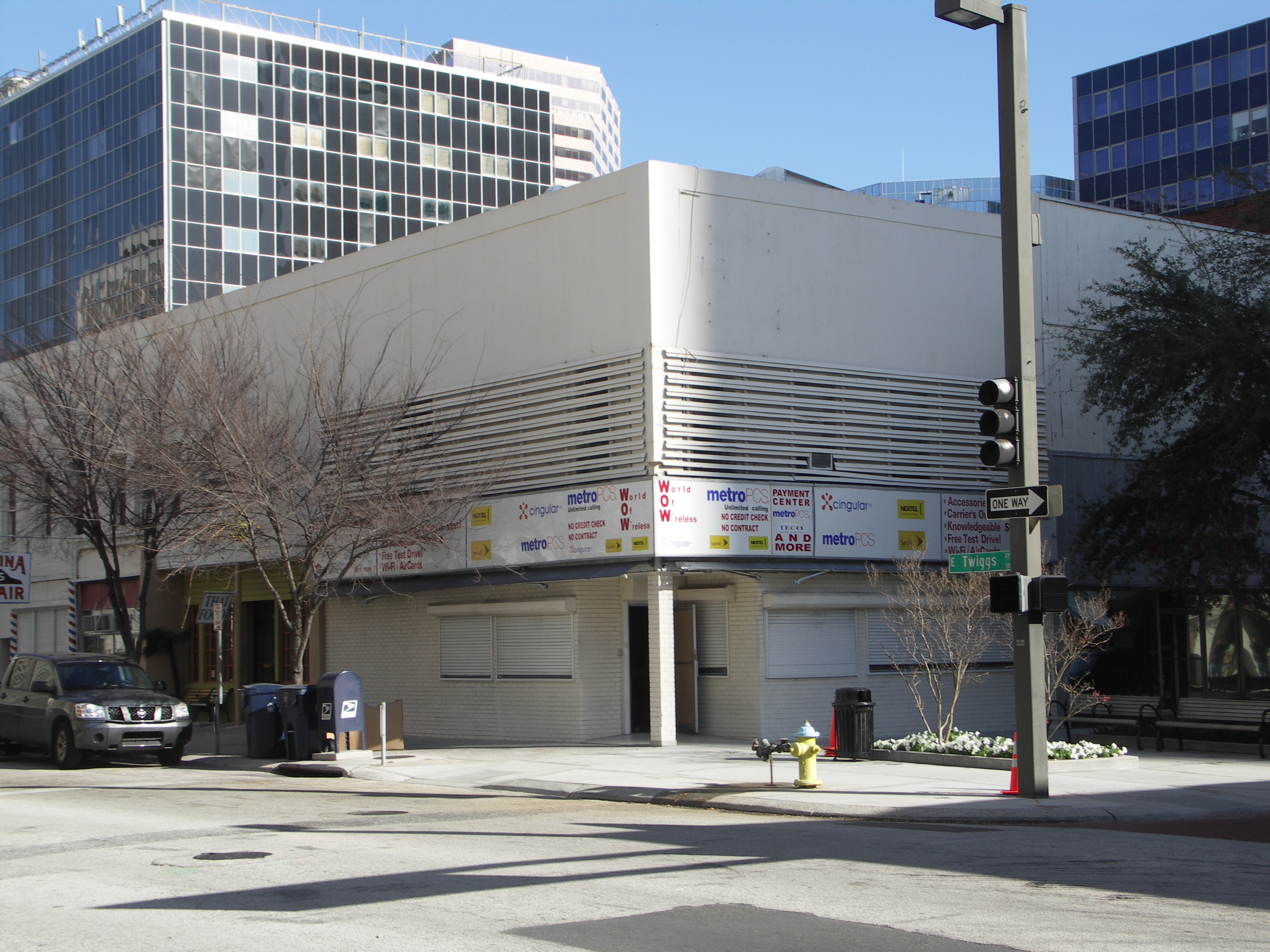
The first Maas Brothers store is the only downtown store still standing

=== Allied Stores ===
In 1929, Abe and Isaac Maas sold Maas Brothers to Hahn Department Stores. Maas Brothers gained the buying power of the 28 department stores while Hahn gained the addition of another successful chain with a loyal customer base. In 1935, Hahn Department Stores changed its name to Allied Stores Corporation. Despite being owned by a national company, Maas Brothers was still operated by the Maas family. In 1935, Isaac Maas, who was serving as chairman of the board died at the age of 71. Abe Maas, who was president, became chairman. Jerome A. Waterman, Abe and Isaac's nephew, became president. Jerome joined Maas Brothers in 1907. Abe Maas died in 1941 at the age of 86.

=== Expansion ===
In 1948, Maas Brothers opened its first full line branch store in downtown St. Petersburg. Other branch stores opened in downtown Lakeland in 1954, downtown Sarasota in 1956 and downtown Clearwater in 1961. Maas Brothers opened its first mall store, in 1965, in the Edison Mall in Fort Myers. By 1981, Maas Brothers opened its 17th store in Gulf View Square Mall in Port Richey. This was the last Maas Brothers store built. In 1985, Maas Brothers absorbed the Savannah, Georgia, based stores of fellow Allied nameplate Levy's of Savannah (founded in 1871 as B. H. Levy & Bro.).

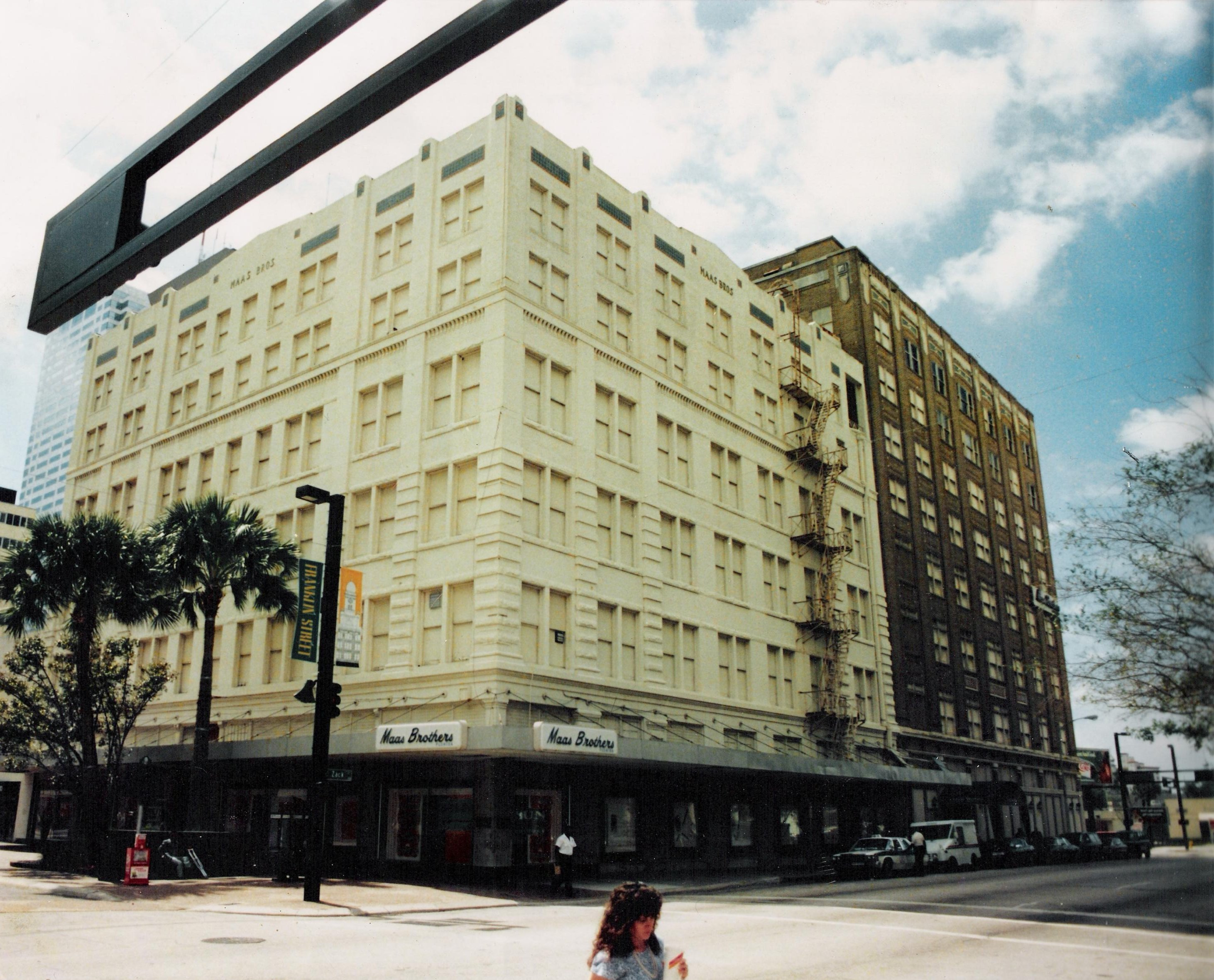
The downtown Tampa Store 1991

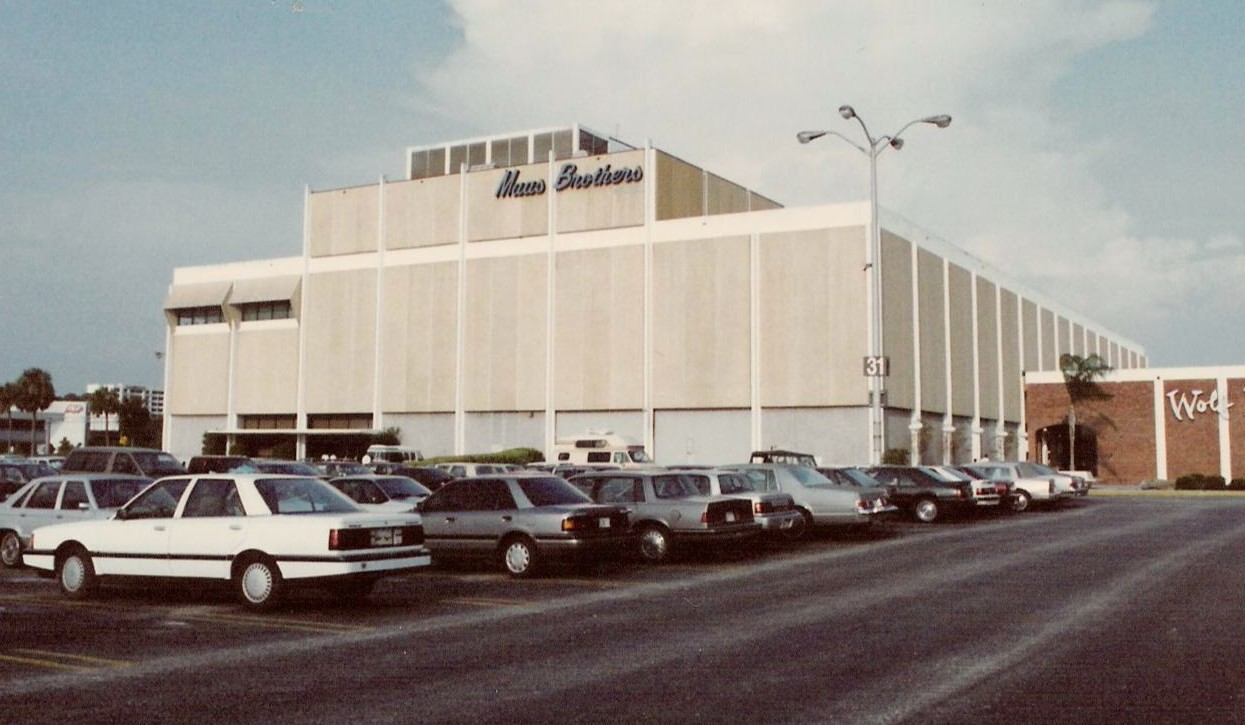
West Shore Plaza Store 1991

=== Campeau takeover ===
In 1986, Maas Brothers celebrated its 100th anniversary. It was in the same year that Canadian real estate developer Robert Campeau completed his takeover of Allied Stores Corporation. As part of liquidation and cost cutting, Maas Brothers was consolidated with the weaker Jordan Marsh Florida franchise on Florida's East Coast in 1987 (Allied's Jordan Marsh had expanded from New England in 1956, later forming a separate Allied division). The plan was that the stronger Maas Brothers would help the weaker Jordan Marsh. This brought the total number of combined stores to 39 throughout Florida, Georgia and South Carolina. In 1989 the official store name was changed to Maas Brothers/Jordan Marsh.

In 1988, Campeau launched a successful takeover battle with Macy's for Federated Department Stores. Ironically, Federated would acquire Macy's in 1994. With the acquisition of Federated, Maas Brothers' formal rival, Miami-based Burdines, became its sister store. As with the Allied acquisition, in order to cut costs, several back office operations for Maas Brothers, Jordan Marsh, and Burdines were consolidated.

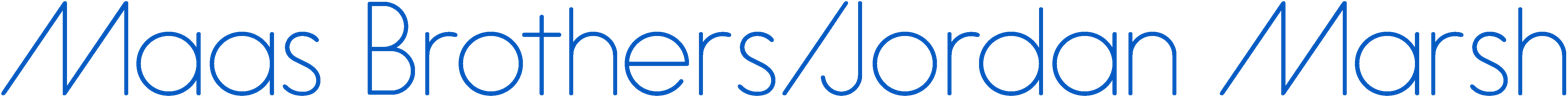
Maas Brothers-Jordan Marsh logo

=== Bankruptcy and merger ===
By 1989, Federated and Allied were struggling to make its debt payments incurred from the takeovers. On January 16, 1990, Federated and Allied filed for Chapter 11 bankruptcy. Several underperforming stores were closed, including the flagship downtown Tampa store in February 1991. As part of its plan of reorganization, the Florida operations would be consolidated and several stores would be closed. The Maas Brothers/Jordan Marsh headquarters was closed and consolidated with Burdines in July 1991. On October 20, 1991, the Maas Brothers stores officially became Burdines. The majority of the former Jordan Marsh stores were sold off since they competed directly with Burdines. Burdines, along with the other Federated divisions except Bloomingdales, were converted to Macy's in 2005.

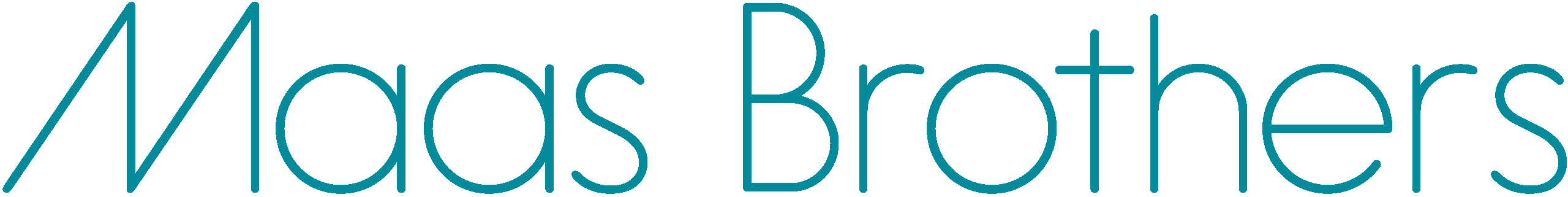
Maas Brothers Department Store Final Logo

=== Former Locations ===
City	Location	Opened	Status
Tampa	Downtown (Zack & Tampa Streets)	1921	Closed in 1991. Building has been demolished.
Tampa	WestShore Plaza	1966	Store was closed in 2025. Mall to be redeveloped.
Tampa	University Mall	1974	Closed by Macy's in 2017. Building was Dillard's Clearance Center from 2017 to 2022. Building was demolished in 2022.
Tampa	Homestore (Gandy Boulevard)	1956	Building was sold in 2021. The store was closed and store and warehouse was demolished in 2025.
St. Petersburg	Downtown (1st Avenue and 3rd Street North)	1948	Closed in 1991. Building has been demolished, though the store's medallion remains in the sidewalk.
St. Petersburg	Tyrone Square Mall	1972	Still operating as Macy's.
Clearwater	Downtown (Cleveland Street & Osceola Avenue)	1961	Closed in 1991. Space later operated by Stein Mart. Building demolished in 2019.
Clearwater	Countryside Mall	1975	Expanded by Burdines in 2000. Still operating as Macy's.
Bradenton	DeSoto Square	1973	Closed by Macy's in 2014. Building was Your Treasure House from 2018 to 2019 and is currently vacant.
Fort Myers	Edison Mall	1965	Still operating as Macy's.
Gainesville	Gainesville Mall	1968	Closed by Burdines in the 1990s.
Hilton Head, South Carolina	The Mall at Shelter Cove	1988	Opened as Jordan Marsh. Closed in 1991.
Lakeland	Downtown (Kentucky & Lemon Streets)	1954	Closed by Burdines in 1994.
Naples	Coastland Center	1977	Second floor added by Burdines in 1995. Still operating as Macy's.
Ocala	Paddock Mall	1973	Still operating as Macy's.
Port Richey	Gulf View Square	1981	Closed by Macy's in 2015. Building has been demolished.
Sarasota	Downtown/Main Plaza (Main Street & Washington Boulevard)	1958	Closed in 1991. Building has been demolished.
Sarasota	Sarasota Square	1976	Closed by Macy's in 2017. Building has been demolished.
Savannah, Georgia	Downtown	1958	Was originally Levy's. Closed in 1987. Acquired by Savannah College of Art and Design and converted to the Jen Library in 1996.
Savannah, Georgia	Oglethorpe Mall	1982	Was originally Levy's. Closed in 1991. Converted to inline mall space in 1992 and connected to a new Rich's.
Tallahassee	Governor's Square	1979	Still operating as Macy's; pending closure announced in January 2024.
Winter Haven	Citi Centre Plaza (previously Winter Haven Mall)	1977	Remodeled by Burdines in 2000. Was a Macy's location until its permanent closure in December 2020.

=== Disposition of the stores ===
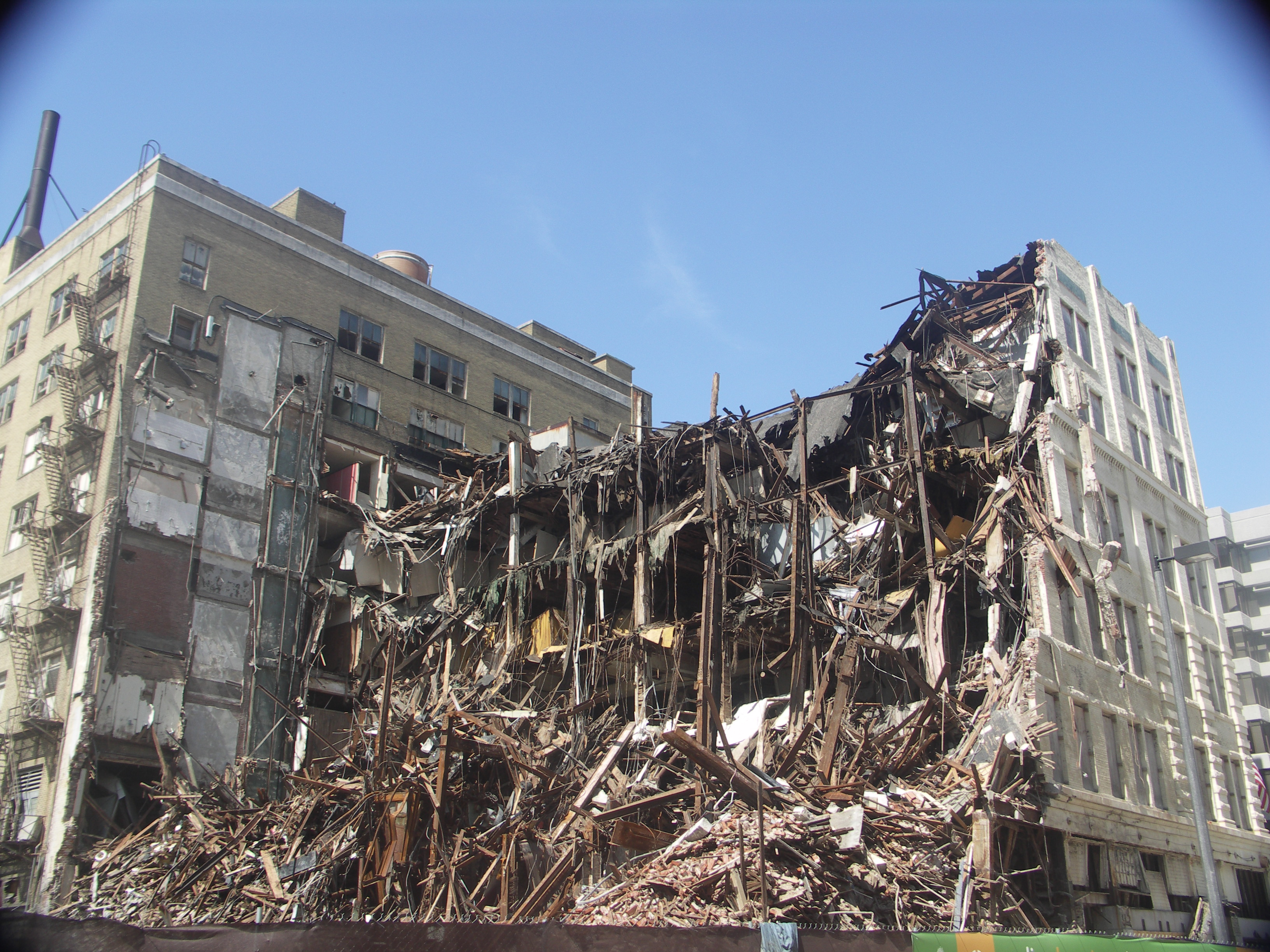
Demolition of the downtown Tampa Store 2006

Many of the Maas Brothers stores developed as mall anchor stores remain as Macy's stores. However, the downtown stores were closed and only one remains occupied today.

- Sarasota. The downtown Sarasota store was closed in 1991 was demolished in October 1996 to make way for a 20 screen theater.
- St. Petersburg. The downtown St. Petersburg enjoyed an interesting afterlife and redevelopment. The store included its original store at the northeast corner of 1st Avenue and 3rd Street North (known as "The Sunshine Corner") and several expansions covering nearly an entire City block. After closing of the store in 1991, the buildings sat vacant for a few years until they were leased to the Florida International Museum (FIM) from 1995 to 2005. During its operation, the FIM borrowed funds from the city of St. Petersburg to purchase the property as a way to eliminate leasing expenses. Although the 2008 Titanic exhibit drew 800,000 visitors to the FIM, the museum thereafter was unable to reach the attendance goals needed to support the limited run "blockbuster" exhibits which served as the centerpiece of the museum's programming. Ultimately, the museum defaulted on its loans and the City took possession of the property. As owner, the City proposed an ambitious redevelopment plan that would include: 1) a new downtown campus for St. Petersburg College to be housed in the former Maas Brothers furniture store comprising nearly the entire north one-half of the block, with the FIM to operate a smaller, and hopefully more sustainable, museum in part of the college space; 2) redevelopment of the original store property at the "Sunshine Corner" with a new 16-storey Florida operations headquarters for Progress Energy, Inc. (formerly Florida Power, then Florida Progress, and now merging with Duke Energy); and 3) redevelopment of the southeast corner of the block with a 29-story Grand Bohemian Hotel and condominium, proposed by Orlando-based Kessler Collection (neither the hotel nor the condominium ever broke ground and the lot is vacant). In July and August 2005, after the city had reached agreements with the three proposed users, the original store and its east addition on the south one-half of the block were demolished to allow the Progress Energy headquarters to begin construction, and St. Petersburg College began modifications for conversion of the furniture store to an educational facility. As a condition for construction of the new Progress Energy headquarters, city officials required the removal of the large vintage terrazzo and brass medallion inlaid into the sidewalk at what was the main entrance to the original store. The medallion reads "The Sunshine Corner," and depicts a map of Florida and a sun with one long brass ray reaching to touch this location in St. Petersburg. When the Progress Energy Tower was completed, the medallion was reinstalled in its original location in the sidewalk to be preserved for future generations.
- Tampa. In 2006 the downtown Tampa store after sitting empty and neglected for 15 years was demolished, to make room for a condo tower. After the real estate bust plans for condo were shelved and the property was sold and has become a parking lot.
- Clearwater. The downtown Clearwater store became the Harborview Center was scheduled to be demolished in May 2010. In August 2010 a film crew leased the building for five months filming the move "A Dolphin's Tale" giving the building a brief reprieve.
- Lakeland. The downtown Lakeland store remained open as Burdines until 1994 when it was relocated to Lakeland Square Mall. It serves as the headquarters for Watkins Trucking, now part of FedEx.

== See also ==
- List of department stores converted to Macy's
- List of defunct department stores of the United States
