= Edward J. DeBartolo Sr. =

American businessman (1909–1994)

- Born: May 17, 1909; Youngstown, Ohio, U.S.
- Died: December 19, 1994 (aged 85); Youngstown, Ohio, U.S.
- Education: University of Notre Dame
- Occupation: Real-estate developer
- Children: 3, including Edward Jr. and Denise

Edward John DeBartolo Sr. (May 17, 1909 – December 19, 1994) was an American businessman and real-estate developer. In 1971, his Ohio-based corporation was ranked 47th among the nation's top 400 construction contractors. In 1983, DeBartolo was included on Forbes magazine's first Forbes 400 list of richest Americans.

== Early years ==
The second of six children, DeBartolo was born in Youngstown, Ohio, a center of steel production that was also a major destination for immigrants from Southern and Eastern Europe. DeBartolo's parents, Anthony Paonessa and Rose Villani, had emigrated to the United States from Italy. DeBartolo never knew his biological father, who died suddenly before his birth.

After Anthony Paonessa's death, Rose Villani Paonessa married Michael DeBartolo, and Edward took his stepfather's family name. Michael DeBartolo emigrated from Terlizzi, Apulia, Italy, with his family at age 17 and became a paving contractor and builder of warehouses and other structures. While a teenager, Edward DeBartolo began working, translating paving contracts for his stepfather, who did not read or write English.

DeBartolo went on to earn a degree in civil engineering at the University of Notre Dame. Next came a decade of construction jobs with his stepfather. Capitalizing on his engineering skills, DeBartolo found himself serving in the Army Corps of Engineers during World War II. It was during the War, in 1944, that he married Marie Patricia Montani and incorporated his own company, the Edward J. DeBartolo Corporation.

== Adult life and career ==
After the war ended, DeBartolo served as president of Michael DeBartolo Construction and as founder and president of his newly formed company. DeBartolo was able to take advantage of dramatic changes occurring across the United States after World War II. As more Americans moved into suburbs, there was a corresponding increase in demand for convenient access to shopping. His first retail development was the construction of Gray Drug and Sears, Roebuck and Co. department store in the "Uptown" area of Youngstown. DeBartolo's company was one of the first companies in the United States to build shopping centers in suburban communities. These shopping centers were initially plazas built as long strips, but soon DeBartolo began developing enclosed shopping malls as well, with brother Frank DeBartolo acting as architect.

DeBartolo also branched out into other types of urban development and construction, such as hotels, office parks, and condominiums. He established a work ethic of 15-hour days and seven-day weeks. He once told his senior executives, "My wife has never seen me lie down while the sun was up." By 1990, DeBartolo was estimated to have more than $1.4 billion in personal wealth.

DeBartolo began acquiring department store chains in the late 1980s. In 1986, he helped finance Robert Campeau's purchase of Allied Stores Corporation, a department store holding corporation that owned such iconic department store brands as Jordan Marsh and Maas Brothers, as well as specialty stores such as Bonwit Teller and Ann Taylor. DeBartolo lent Campeau $150 million to bridge the financing gap for the acquisition. Campeau repaid the money. In 1986, DeBartolo assisted in financing Allied Stores Corporation's acquisition of Federated Department Stores, a department store holding company and the owner of, among other assets, Macy's and Bloomingdale's department stores. DeBartolo provided nearly $500 million in financing. In 1990, Federated went bankrupt, defaulting on the repayment of the loans made by DeBartolo; it emerged from bankruptcy after the ouster of Campeau in 1992 as a new public company under the name "Macy's, Inc." During the course of the bankruptcy, DeBartolo's cash flow was severely impaired, due to Federated's nonpayment as well as the real estate recession of the time. DeBartolo's Federated positions were all realigned when Federated emerged from bankruptcy.

In May 1988, the Securities and Exchange Commission began a probe against him to determine whether DeBartolo had secretly and illegally aided Paul Bilzerian's hostile takeover attempts through "stock parking", in which one party purchases shares in coordination with another to keep legal ownership separated and avoid either party's holdings exceeding disclosure thresholds.

In 1988, DeBartolo partnered with Dillard's Department Stores to buy Higbee's of Cleveland, Ohio. In 1992, William Dillard, founder of Dillard's, bought DeBartolo's share, except for the property interest in Higbee's Public Square flagship store in Cleveland (sold to Tower City in 2001), and renamed it the Higbee chain. DeBartolo's idea of a retail real estate developer going forward with new projects easily and quickly by virtue of anchor stores which he owned, would never become a reality.

== Philanthropy ==
DeBartolo's contributions to the campus at the University of Notre Dame include a $33 million donation, the largest ever given to both Notre Dame and ever received by a college in Indiana at the time, which funded the Marie P. DeBartolo Center for the Performing Arts, the Edward J. DeBartolo Classroom Facility, and the quad surrounding the facility. The facilities have since been renamed the DeBartolo Performing Arts Center, DeBartolo Hall, and DeBartolo Quad. There is also a DeBartolo Hall on the campus of Youngstown State University (YSU), in his hometown of Youngstown, where DeBartolo has made many endowments to YSU. The DeBartolo Corporation continues to be based in nearby Boardman, Ohio.

== Sporting interests ==
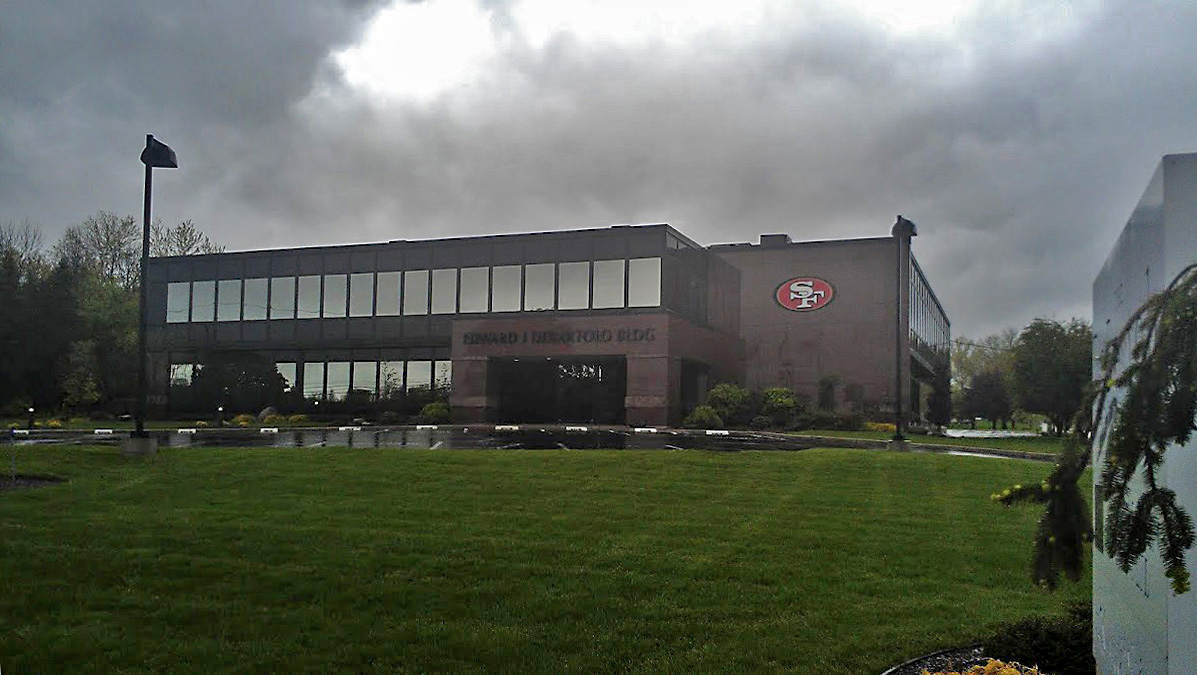
The headquarters of The DeBartolo Corporation in Boardman, Ohio, with the San Francisco 49ers logo on the building, signifying the team's ownership by the DeBartolo-York family.

DeBartolo purchased the San Francisco 49ers in 1977, giving the team to his son. DeBartolo Jr. devoted significant resources to the team, became an expert in team management and player relations, and made it the most successful NFL franchise in the 1980s.

DeBartolo founded the Pittsburgh Maulers of the United States Football League in March 1983, but folded the team after the first season (1984) when the league announced it would move to a fall schedule, the same time as the NFL's Pittsburgh Steelers.

The family also owned the Pittsburgh Penguins of the National Hockey League from February 1977 until selling it to an ownership group led by Howard Baldwin in November 1991. The Penguins would win the Stanley Cup in 1991, just before the sale. DeBartolo's name would be engraved on the Stanley Cup along with that of his daughter Denise DeBartolo York. DeBartolo said at a rally after the first win that the occasion was "possibly the happiest moment of my life."

DeBartolo owned the Pittsburgh Spirit soccer team from 1978 to 1986.

DeBartolo owned and developed three thoroughbred racetracks – Thistledown in North Randall, Ohio, Remington Park in Oklahoma City, and Louisiana Downs in Bossier City, Louisiana. This involvement in horse racing was a factor in his unsuccessful $20 million attempt to purchase the Chicago White Sox from Bill Veeck which fell two votes short of the necessary three-quarters approval from American League owners on October 24, 1980. Commissioner of Baseball Bowie Kuhn invoked the "best interests of baseball" clause to dissuade the owners from approving the sale additionally on the grounds of absentee ownership and a potential franchise move to New Orleans. The White Sox were eventually sold to an investment group led by Jerry Reinsdorf and Eddie Einhorn three months later on January 29, 1981.

== Death ==
DeBartolo died of pneumonia on December 19, 1994, in Youngstown, Ohio, at the age of 85.
