= Burdines =

Department store chain based in Miami

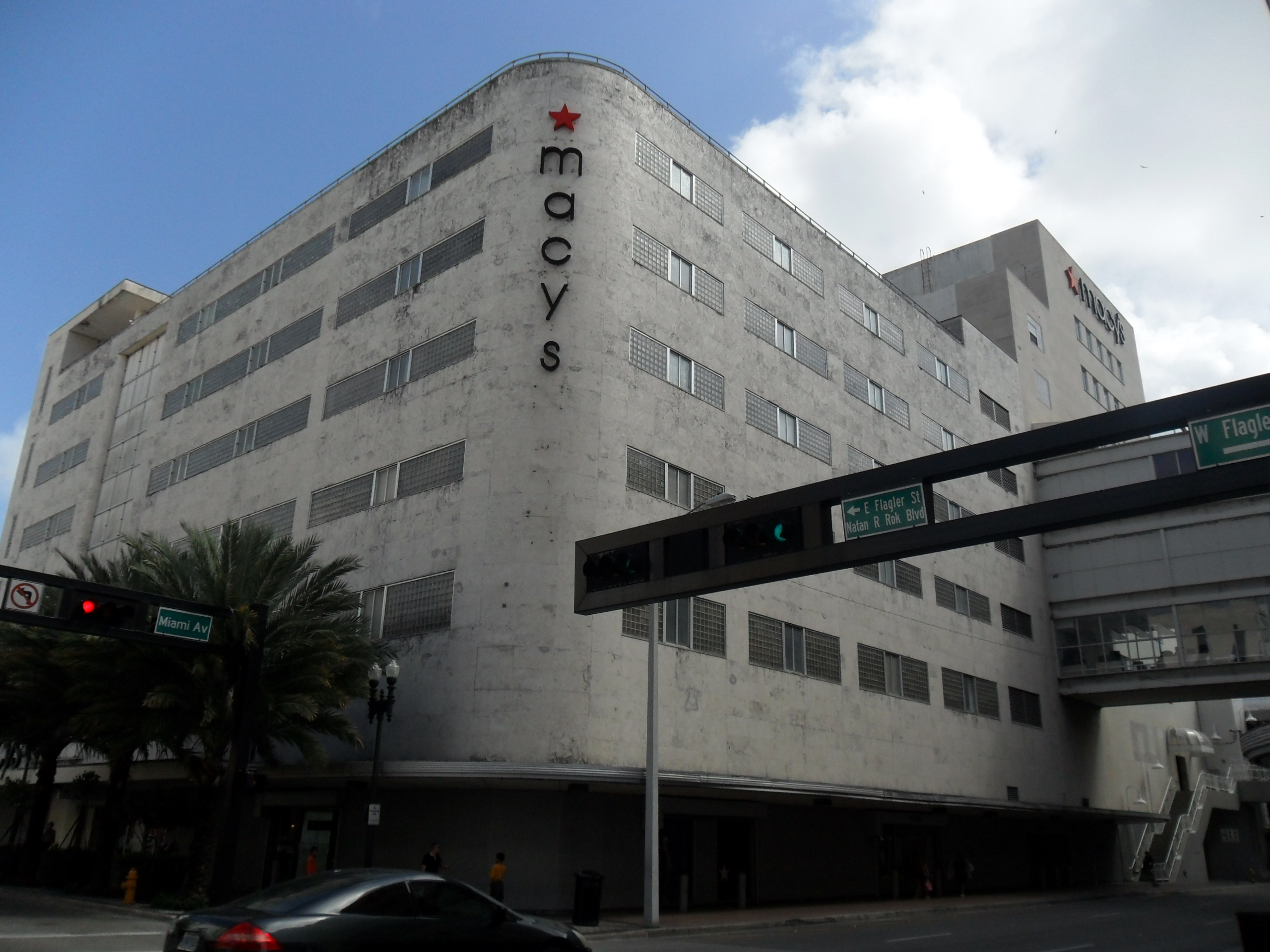
- Exterior of the former flagship store after conversion to Macy's (2016)
- Formerly: Burdines–Macy's (2004–2005)
- Type: Subsidiary
- Industry: Retail
- Genre: Department stores
- Founded: 1898; 128 years ago Miami, Florida, United States
- Founders: William M. Burdine; John Burdine
- Defunct: March 6, 2005; 21 years ago
- Fate: Rebranding by Federated Department Stores
- Successor: Macy's
- Headquarters: Miami, Florida, United States
- Number of locations: 58 (at peak, 1990s)
- Products: Clothing; footwear; bedding; furniture; jewelry; beauty products; housewares
- Parent: Federated Department Stores (1956–2005)

Burdines (English: /bɜːrˈdaɪnz/ bur-DYNZE) was an American department store chain founded in 1898 by William M. and John Burdine. It operated exclusively in Florida, with its flagship store and headquarters both located in Miami. It evolved from a "carriage trade" shop into a full-line department store chain nicknamed "The Florida Store", decorated with palm trees in the center of the store, painted in pink and blue, and other subtropical colors and motifs. The chain was purchased by Federated Department Stores in 1956; it co-branded the chain as Burdines–Macy's in 2004, and dissolved the Burdines brand completely with its full conversion to Macy's in 2005.

== History ==
=== Origins and establishment ===
In 1897, Henry Payne and William M. Burdine opened a dry goods store in the central Florida city of Bartow. A year later, Payne left the company, and Burdine brought in his son, John, as a partner, resulting in the company's name change to W.M. Burdine and Son. In 1898, Burdine bought a block on South Miami Avenue, one block south of Flagler Street, in the then-fledgling community of Miami. That year, he opened the first W.M. Burdine & Son store at the location, just two years after the first people had arrived in the area from the newly completed Florida East Coast Railway to incorporate the city. His tiny store held only a few shelves of clothing, which were primarily sold to construction workers, soldiers from the Spanish–American War, and the local Miccosukee and Seminole Native Americans. Burdine was amazed with the business that he did in Miami and decided to close his store in Bartow and move his operations base to Miami, changing the business name to Burdines and Sons.

=== Expansion and acquisition by Federated ===
Burdines old logo

William died in 1911, and his other son, Roddy, took over the chain. By then, Burdines had grown into a full-fledged department store and continued expanding. The land-boom of the 1920s helped the store launch its first branch in Miami Beach. As Florida's population soared, so did the growth of Burdines. Over the next thirty years, four other branches opened across the state of Florida.

In the late 1940s, Burdines opened an international mail order program that served Latin America. This resulted in a rise of popularity for the company, and military personnel stationed in Cuba would send a supply ship to Miami every 6 months with orders for Burdines.

In 1956, Burdines merged with Federated Department Stores, Inc. The financial support given by Federated allowed Burdines to push north and westward in the 1970s and 1980s. Beginning in 1966, Burdines opened stores in:

- Hialeah (at Westland Mall)
- Pompano Beach
- Hollywood
- Orlando (at Orlando Fashion Square)
- Altamonte Springs
- Clearwater (at Clearwater Mall)
- Sarasota (at Southgate Mall)
- Fort Lauderdale (Clearance Center)
- Plantation (at Broward Mall)
- Boca Raton
- South Dade (Clearance Center)
- Fort Myers (at Edison Mall)
- West Palm Beach (at Palm Beach Shopping Center)
- St. Petersburg
- Cutler Ridge
- Fort Lauderdale (at The Galleria at Fort Lauderdale, 1981)
- Daytona Beach
- Lakeland (at Lakeland Square Mall)
- Doral (at Miami International Mall)
- Melbourne (at Melbourne Square Mall)
- Tampa (at Tampa Bay Center and University Square)
- Coconut Grove (at Mayfair Shops, 1984-1991)
- Coral Springs (at Coral Square Mall)
- Boynton Beach
- Palm Beach Gardens (at Gardens Mall)

In 1971, the Burdines store in Dadeland Mall became the largest suburban department store south of New York. Burdines also piloted auto centers, beginning in 1960, at their 163rd St location and the Miami warehouse, after testing it in Fort Lauderdale.

=== Conversion of Allied stores ===
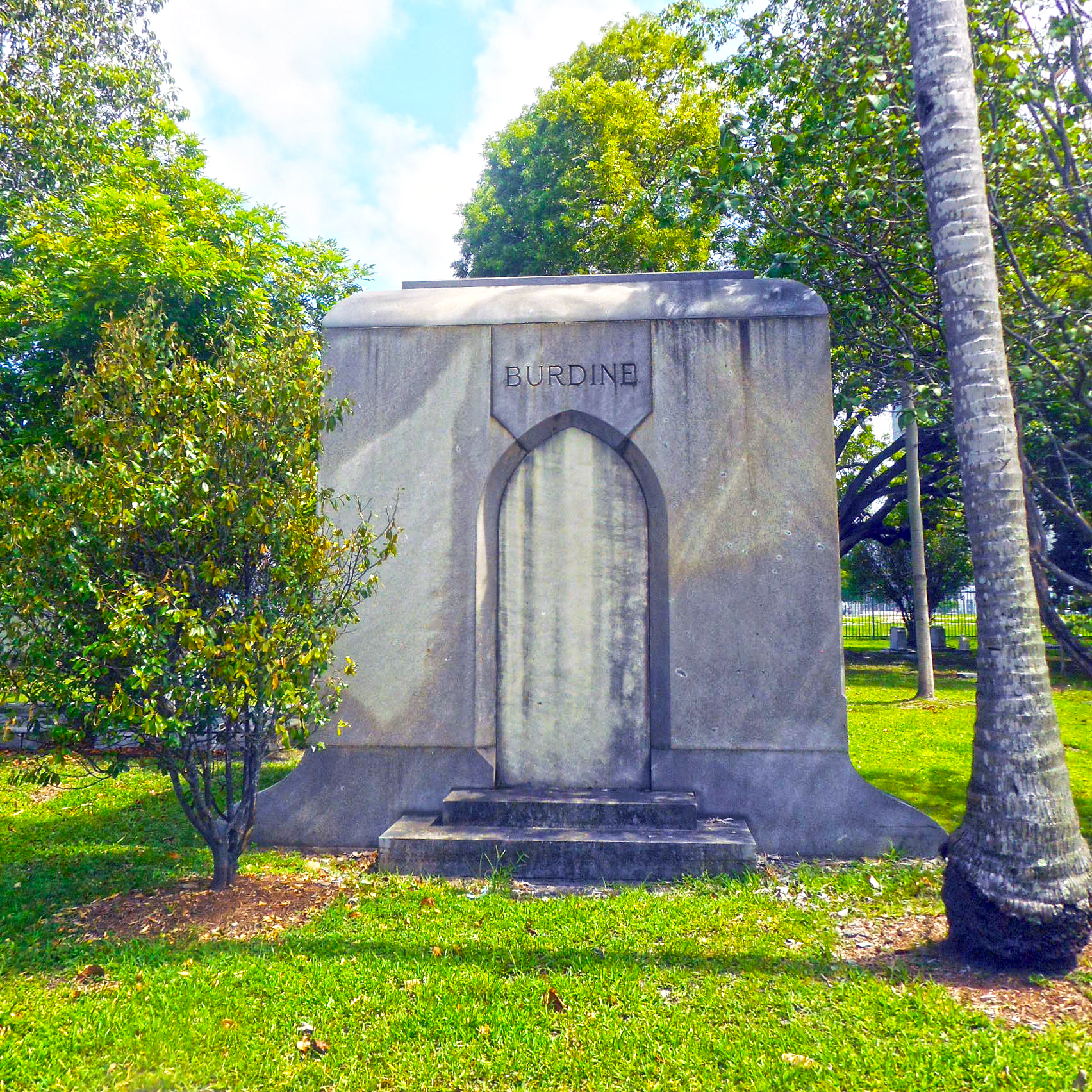
The Burdine family mausoleum in the Miami City Cemetery

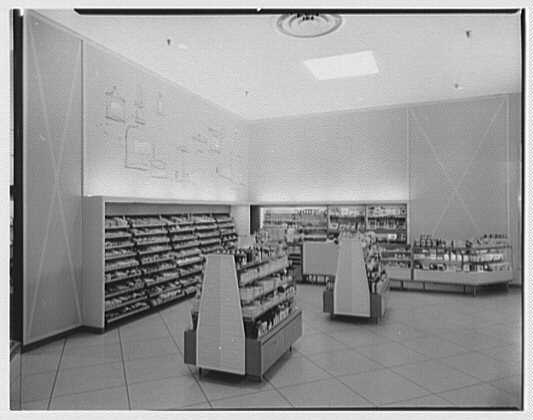
Burdines in Miami

In 1991, following the 1988 merger of Federated with the Allied Stores Corporation and subsequent bankruptcy reorganization, Burdines absorbed Allied's Tampa-based Maas Brothers/Jordan Marsh Florida division, converting many of the stores to Burdines and closing the rest. The conversion resulted in there being fifty-eight Burdines stores in the state of Florida, more than twice their initial store count of 27.

During the 1990s, stores opened at Pembroke Lakes Mall in Pembroke Pines in the Miami Metropolitan Area, Brandon Town Center in Brandon in the Tampa Bay Area, and Seminole Towne Center in Sanford in the Orlando Metropolitan Area.

From 1999 to 2001, Burdines experienced major growth, expanding into seven new locations and significantly renovating their existing stores with a lighter color palette and an upgraded décor. The most publicly anticipated stores that opened during this period were those located in expansions of The Florida Mall in Orlando and Aventura Mall in Aventura, while other stores opened with new shopping malls such as Citrus Park Town Center in Citrus Park and The Mall at Wellington Green in Wellington.

During this period, Burdines also tried another new layout at their store in St. Petersburg's Tyrone Square Mall, in an attempt to improve convenience for shoppers. The store upgraded to use a central checkout system and was expected to be more popular among shoppers since they would only need to see a cashier once before leaving. However, the design failed as an employee had to manually apply a coded sticker (identifying who made the sale) to the price tag of each item before customers left the store. Thus, this convenience plan was quickly abandoned by Burdines, and the company resumed using traditional cashier layouts.

=== Conversion to Macy's ===
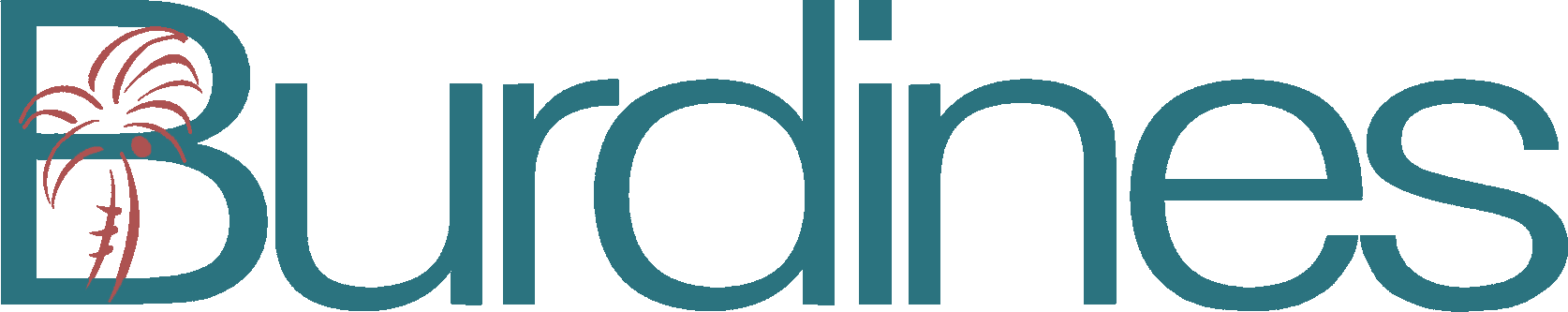
Burdines Department Store Final Logo

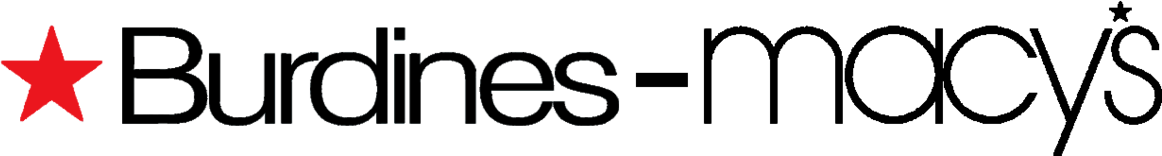
Burdines-Macy's transition logo

The former flagship store in Miami, built in stages from the 1910s through the 1930s, continued to operate as a Macy's until it was closed in March 2018. Ross Stores leased the building in 2019, and redeveloped it to relocate a nearby store whose building was set to be demolished in favor of a 92-story skyscraper. The redevelopment permitted a second store to be located on the first floor of the building. The new store opened on March 7, 2020.

== See also ==
- List of department stores converted to Macy's
- List of defunct department stores of the United States
- Retail apocalypse
- Dead mall

Records
Preceded by N/A	Tallest building in Miami; 1912–1917	Succeeded by Ralston Building
