= List of shopping malls in the Miami metropolitan area =

This is a list of shopping malls in Miami-Dade, Broward and Palm Beach counties (South Florida) in the U.S. state of Florida.

Name	Location	Features
Aventura Mall	Aventura	JCPenney, Macy's, Nordstrom, and Bloomingdale's, in addition to a 24-screen AMC Theatres
Bal Harbour Shops	Bal Harbour	Neiman Marcus, Saks Fifth Avenue
Bayside Marketplace	Downtown Miami	
Boynton Beach Mall	Boynton Beach	
Brickell City Centre	Brickell, Miami	
Broward Mall	Plantation	
Clematis Street	West Palm Beach	
CocoWalk	Coconut Grove, Miami	
Coral Square	Coral Springs	
Dadeland Mall	Kendall	
Dania Pointe	Dania Beach	Hobby Lobby, T.J. Maxx, YouFit Gyms, Sprouts Farmers Market, BrandsMart, Puttshack, Bowlero, Regal Cinemas, Spirit Airlines HQ, Marriott, AC Hotels
Dolphin Mall	Sweetwater	
Downtown Abacoa	Abacoa, Jupiter	
Downtown Palm Beach Gardens	Palm Beach Gardens	
Esplanade Palm Beach	Palm Beach	
The Falls	Kendall	
Festival Flea Market Mall	Pompano Beach	
The Galleria at Fort Lauderdale	Fort Lauderdale	
The Gardens Mall	Palm Beach Gardens	
The Grand Doubletree Shops	Downtown Miami	
Harbourside Place	Jupiter Beach	
Lakes Mall	Lauderdale Lakes	
Las Olas Riverfront	Fort Lauderdale	
Las Olas Shops	Fort Lauderdale	
Lauderhill Mall	Lauderhill	
Legacy Place	Palm Beach Gardens	
Lincoln Road Mall	City Center, Miami Beach	
Loehmann's Fashion Island	Aventura	
The Mall at 163rd Street	North Miami Beach	
The Mall at Wellington Green	Wellington	
Metrofare Shops & Cafe	Government Center, Downtown Miami	
Miami Design District	Design District, Miami	
Miami International Mall	Doral	
Midway Crossings (formerly Mall of the Americas)	Miami	
Miracle Marketplace	Coral Way, Miami	
Miracle Mile	Coral Gables	
Mizner Park	Boca Raton	
Oakland Park Flea Market	Oakland Park	
Omni International Mall	Downtown Miami	
Palm Beach Outlets	West Palm Beach	
Pembroke Lakes Mall	Pembroke Pines	
Pompano Citi Centre	Pompano Beach	
The Promenade at Coconut Creek	Coconut Creek	
Sawgrass Mills	Sunrise	
Seminole Paradise	Hollywood	
The Shops at Fontainebleau	Miami Beach	
The Shops at Mary Brickell Village	Brickell, Miami	
Shops at Merrick Park	Coral Gables	
The Shops at Midtown Miami	Midtown Miami	
The Shops at Pembroke Gardens	Pembroke Pines	
The Shops at Sunset Place	South Miami	
Southland Mall	Cutler Bay	
The Square	West Palm Beach, Florida	
Town Center at Boca Raton	Boca Raton	
Tuttle Royale	Royal Palm Beach, Florida (coming soon)	
Twin City Mall	North Palm Beach	
The Village at Gulfstream Park	Hallandale Beach	
Village of Merrick Park	Coral Gables	
Westland Mall	Hialeah	
Worth Avenue	Palm Beach	
