= Coral Square =

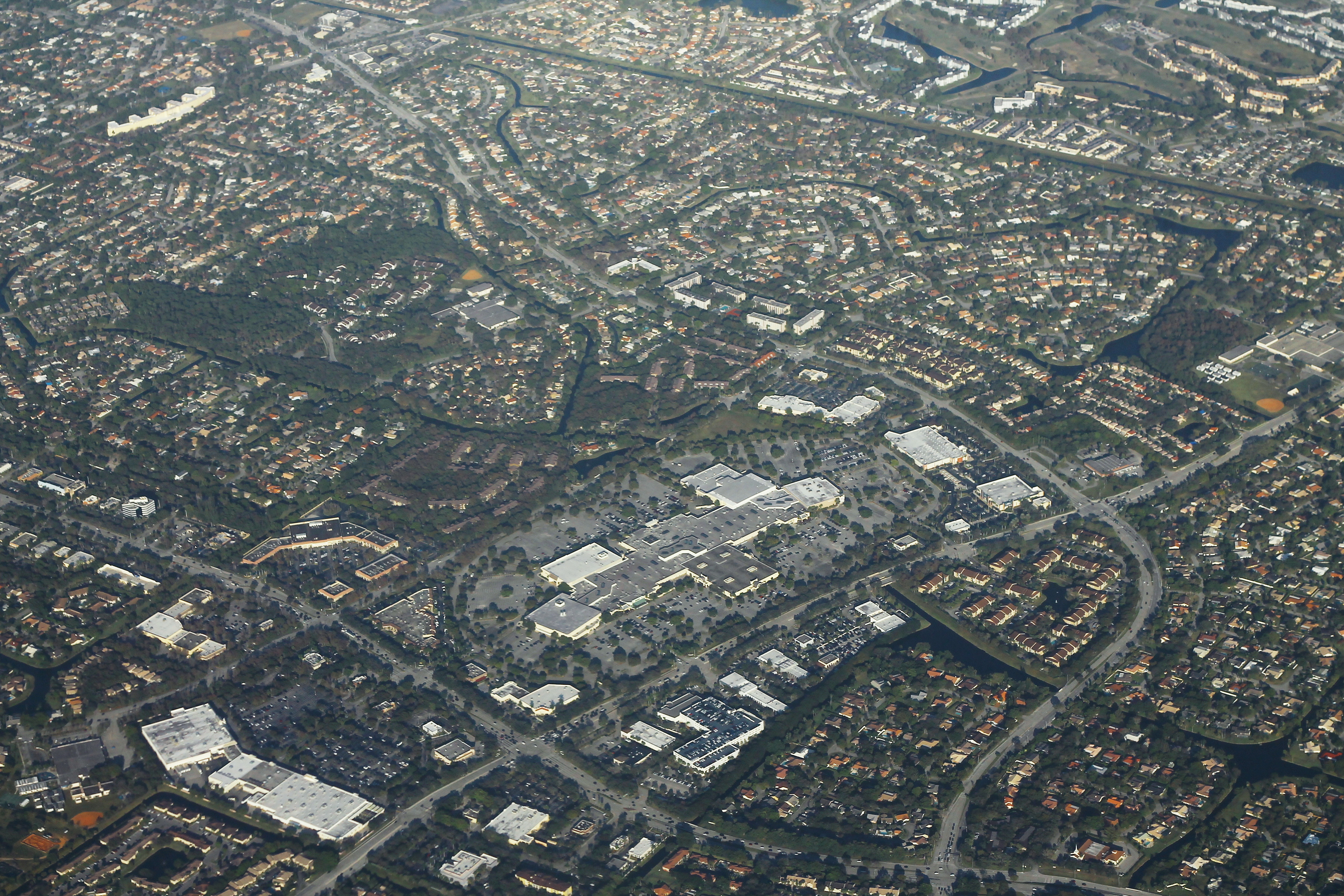
- Aerial photo of the mall
- Location: Coral Springs, Florida, United States
- Coordinates: 26.2412525°N 80.2493377°W
- Address: 9469 West Atlantic Boulevard
- Opened: October 3, 1984; 42 years ago
- Developer: Edward J. DeBartolo Corp. and JCPenney
- Manager: Simon Property Group
- Owner: Simon Property Group (97.2%)
- Num. of stores: 120
- Num. of anchor tenants: 5 (4 open, 1 vacant)
- Floor area: 944,159 square feet (87,715 m^{2})
- Floors: 1 (2 in JCPenney, Kohl's, Macy's Men, Children, & Home, and former Sears)
- Parking: 8,618
- Website: www.simon.com/mall/coral-square

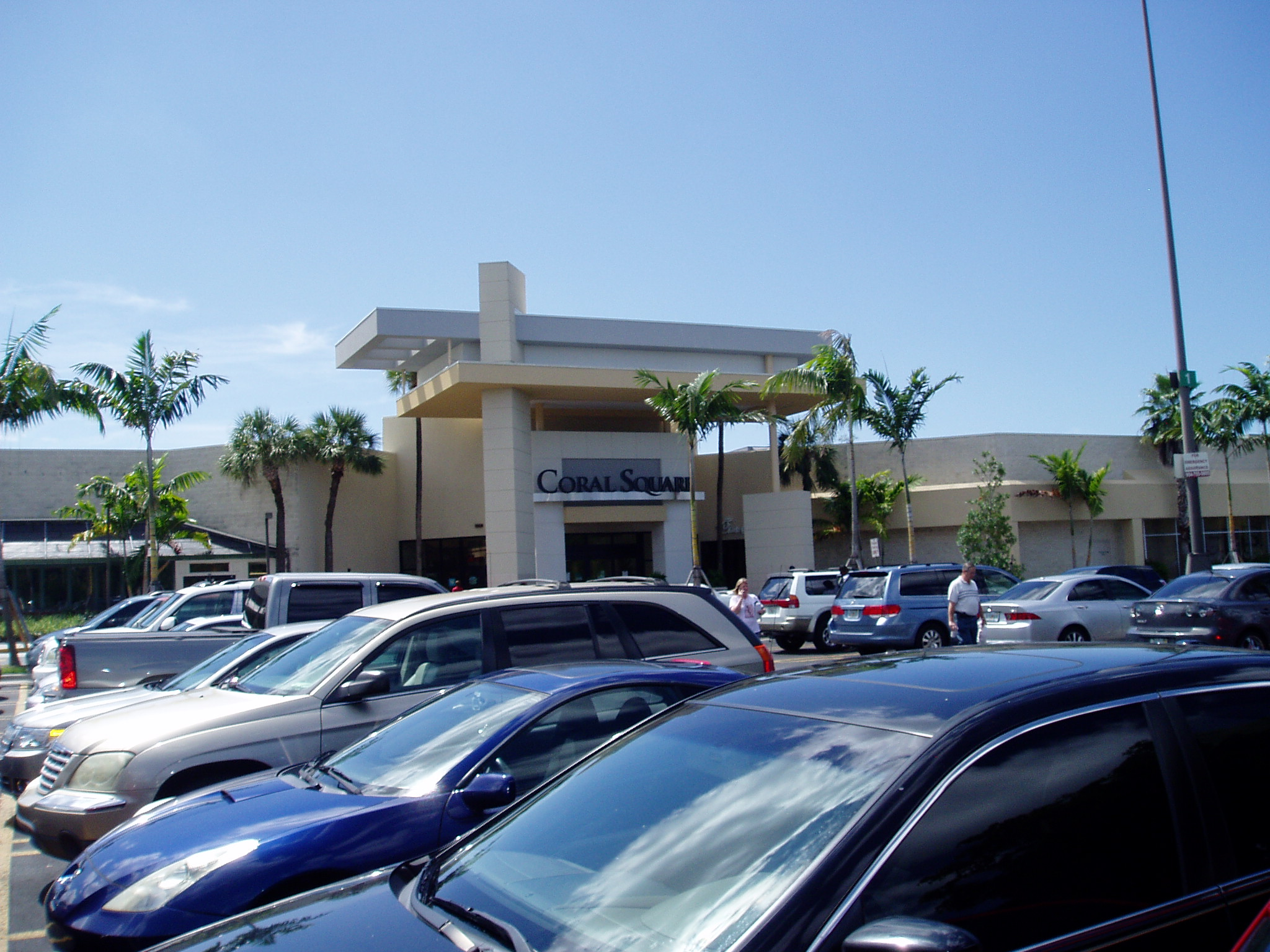
The mall's north entrance in between JCPenney and former Sears

Coral Square, often fully referred to as Coral Square Mall, is a regional enclosed shopping mall located northwest of Fort Lauderdale in Coral Springs, Florida, on the northeast corner of Atlantic Boulevard and University Drive; it opened in 1984. The mall features 120 retailers, including JCPenney, Kohl's and 2 Macy's locations as its anchors.

Originally developed by a joint venture of Eddie DeBartolo of DeBartolo Realty & JCP Realty, Inc. (a subsidiary of JCPenney) and the second mall in western Broward County (the first was Broward Mall in 1978), it is currently managed by Simon Property Group, which owns 97.2%, having fallen to Simon following the 1996 merger of Simon and DeBartolo Realty into Simon DeBartolo Group.

== History ==
The mall opened on October 3, 1984 with four anchor stores: two Miami-based chains, Burdines and Jordan Marsh (the latter debuted a year later and both today operate as Macy's) along with New York-based Lord & Taylor (now Kohl's) and national retailer JCPenney. Initially, the second of its kind (a single-level center with three bi-level anchors) in Broward County (the first was Pompano Fashion Square 15 years earlier, followed by Pembroke Lakes Mall 8 years later), the mall is almost identical to Boynton Beach Mall and The Florida Mall with its space frame ceiling, similar to other DeBartolo properties.

Room existed for a fifth future anchor, and in 1989, Sears joined making Coral Square the second mall in Broward with five anchor stores. No other mall countywide housed five anchors at that time except for The Galleria at Fort Lauderdale, though eventually Pembroke Lakes would from 1995 to 1997.

Shortly after, department store consolidations began to impact the anchor line-up. In 1991, Lord & Taylor was replaced by Mervyn's and Burdines converted Jordan Marsh into a men, children and home store. The 1997 withdrawal of Mervyn's led to Dillard's taking over, lasting until 2010 and becoming Kohl's in 2011.

The mall was renovated in 1995, 2008 and 2022, but never expanded aside from the aforementioned addition of Sears. Meanwhile, Burdines merged with Macy's in 2003, becoming a 2 store operation under the Macy's nameplate in 2005.

On February 6, 2020, it was announced that Sears would be closing as part of a plan to close 39 stores nationwide. The store closed in April 2020, thus bringing the mall back to its original four anchor pad configuration.
