= Florida State Road 820 =

State highway in Florida, United States

State Road 820

Route information
- Maintained by FDOT
- Length: 19.939 mi (32.089 km)
- Existed: 1945–present

Major junctions
- West end: US 27 in Pembroke Pines
- I-75 in Pembroke Pines; Florida's Turnpike in Hollywood; US 441 / SR 7 in Hollywood; I-95 in Hollywood; US 1 in Hollywood
- East end: SR A1A in Hollywood

Location
- Country: United States
- State: Florida
- Counties: Broward

Highway system
- Florida State Highway System; Interstate; US; State; Former; Pre‑1945; Toll; Scenic
← SR 818	→ SR 821

State Road 820 (SR 820), locally known as Pines Boulevard and Hollywood Boulevard, is a 19.956-mile-long (32.116 km) divided east–west highway serving southern Broward County, Florida. Its western terminus is an intersection with U.S. Highway 27 (US 27 or State Road 25) in Pembroke Pines, Florida; and its eastern terminus is a trumpet interchange with State Road A1A in Hollywood, Florida. SR 820 is the southernmost of three roads in Broward County that connects US 27 and A1A, the others being Sheridan Street and Griffin Road. SR 820 also serves as the latitudinal baseline for the street grid that incorporates Hollywood, Pembroke Pines, Miramar, West Park, and Pembroke Park.

== Route description ==
Pines Boulevard begins at an intersection with Okeechobee Road near the western fringes of Broward County development and the Everglades. State Road 820 follows Pines Boulevard east, as the first several miles of the road are newer residential developments, with some schools and grocery shops dotted on the road before an interchange with Interstate 75 (I-75). East of I-75, it passes through some more residential developments before becoming commercial at the intersection of Flamingo Road. CB Smith Park and Pembroke Lakes Mall are located there, which in 2001 was considered "most dangerous intersection in the United States" by State Farm Insurance. Continuing east, the road is mostly commercial dotted with some residential areas until it reaches University Drive, where Pines Boulevard becomes the northern boundary of North Perry Airport. At this point, the road to the north becomes mostly residential, and at SW 60th Avenue, Pines Boulevard becomes Hollywood Boulevard, and the road begins to form the southern border of Hollywood. Residential developments then dot both sides of the road, with Broward College south campus appearing to the north just west of the interchange with Florida's Turnpike, where SR 820 leaves Pembroke Pines and enters Hollywood, where it stays for the rest of the route.

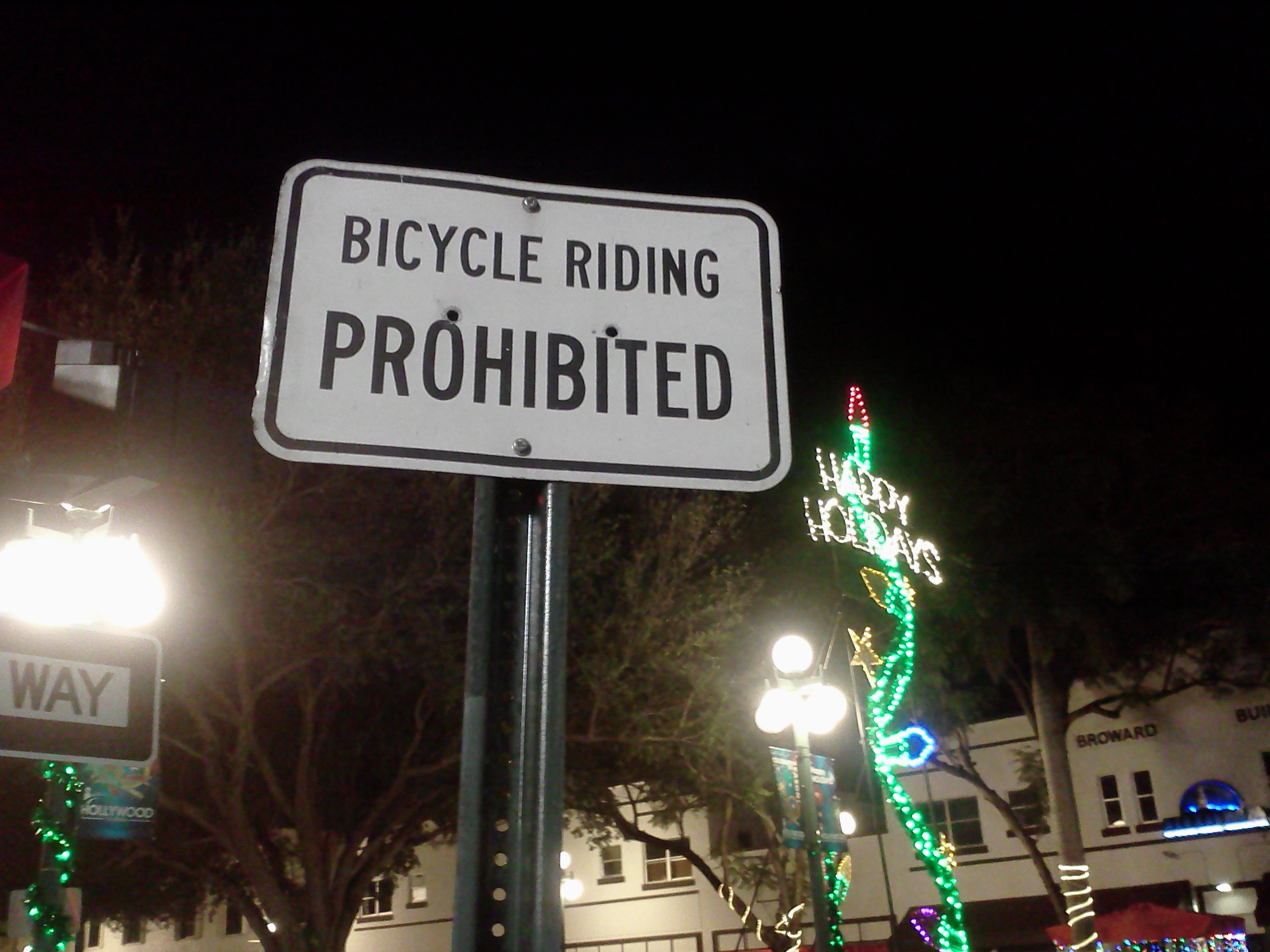
A sign on Hollywood Boulevard where it approaches downtown east of the Florida East Coast railway.

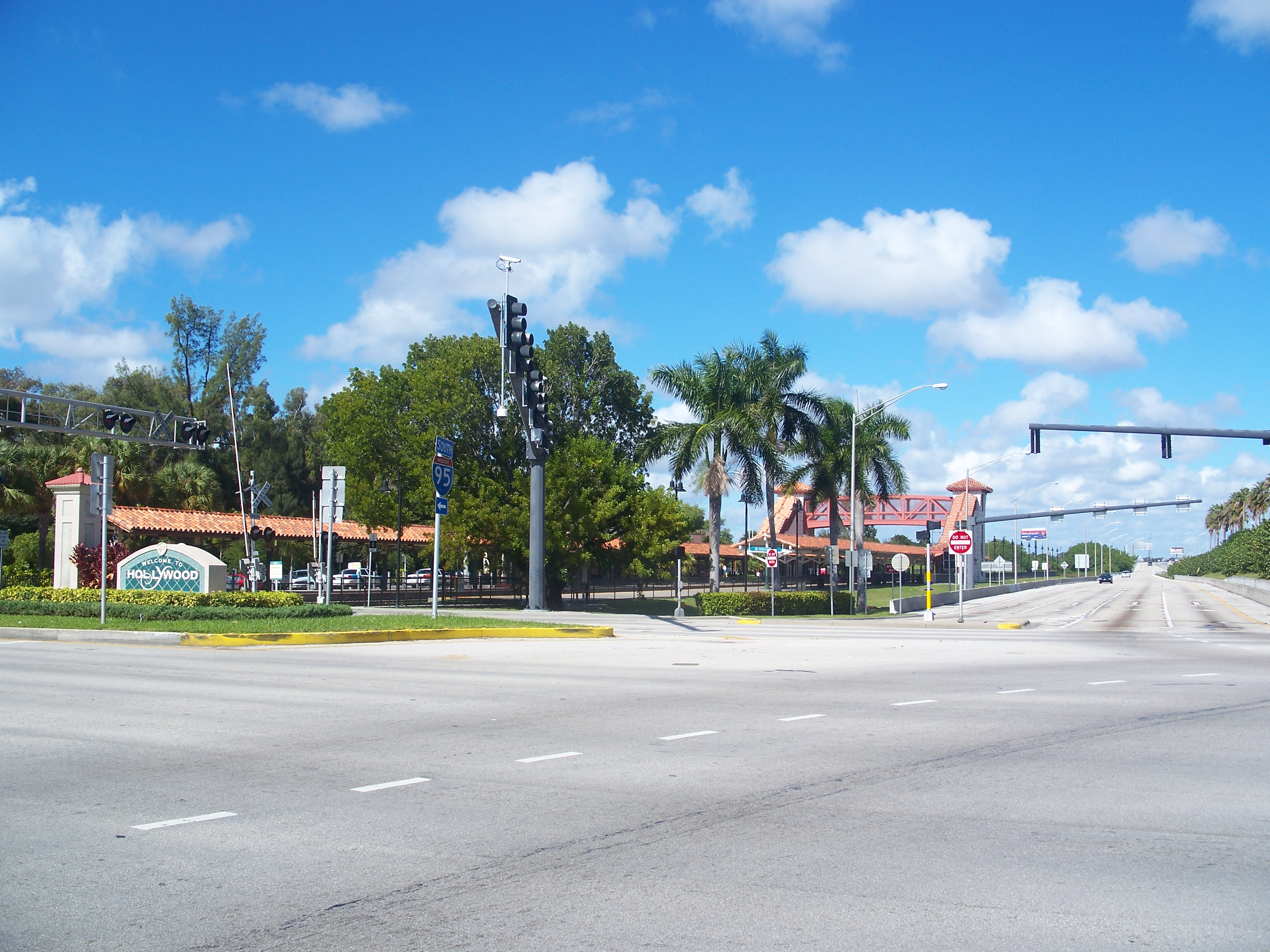
SR 820 intersects Interstate 95 just east of the Hollywood Train Station

East of the Turnpike, SR 820 becomes commercial again, as it quickly intersects with US 441/SR 7, with the defunct Hollywood Fashion Center on the southeast corner of the intersection. East of the old shopping center, the road again becomes residential, with multi level buildings now lining the main street along with single story houses. It then hits the Presidential Circle, the first of three large traffic circles in the Historic District of downtown Hollywood, with the center currently housing a high rise commercial building. Commercial development dots Hollywood Boulevard for a few more blocks before a few blocks of residential development, where SR 820 hits the interchange with Interstate 95. Commercial development continues east, with the road hitting the City Hall Circle, the second of the three large circles. The road then hits Dixie Highway, entering the Hollywood Boulevard Historic Business District, followed by an intersection with US 1/SR 5 which contains Young Circle, the last of the three circles and exiting the Historic District. From here to the eastern terminus, the road is residential, as it crosses the drawbridge over the Intracoastal Waterway, then ending at a trumpet interchange with SR A1A, providing access to the Atlantic Ocean beaches along State Road A1A.

== History ==
State Road 820 was formed in 1945 with its current route, and was State Road 518 prior to 1945. The newly designated SR 820 would continue to be known as Hollywood Boulevard for its entire length until its western section, past Seventy-Second Avenue, was renamed Pines Boulevard after the city of Pembroke Pines was founded in 1960.

=== "The Most Dangerous Intersection in America" ===
In 2001, State Farm Insurance ranked the intersection of Flamingo Road and Pines Boulevard in Pembroke Pines, "The Most Dangerous Intersection in America". Using data from over a two-year period, the company found that 357 vehicular accidents happened during their study at the intersection, which is where C. B. Smith Park, Pembroke Lakes Mall, a hospital, and two shopping centers are located. This prompted the city to make drastic changes to the intersection, which included lengthening the turning lanes and adding red light cameras. The number of accidents have since dropped significantly at the intersection.

== Major intersections ==
The entire route is in Broward County.

Location	mi	km	Destinations	Notes
Pembroke Pines	0.000	0.000	US 27	Unsigned SR 25
Pembroke Pines	5.73	9.22	I-75 – Naples, Miami	Exits 9A-B on I-75 (unsigned SR 93)
Pembroke Pines	7.508	12.083	SR 823 (Flamingo Road) to Florida's Turnpike Extension	Named "Most Dangerous Intersection in America" by State Farm Insurance in 2001
Pembroke Pines	11.470	18.459	SR 817 (University Drive) to I-595	
Hollywood	13.68	22.02	Florida's Turnpike – Orlando, Miami	Exit 49 on Florida's Turnpike (unsigned SR 91)
Hollywood	13.990	22.515	US 441 (SR 7)	
Hollywood	16.60	26.72	I-95 – West Palm Beach, Miami	Exit 20 on I-95 (unsigned SR 9)
Hollywood	16.826	27.079	28th Avenue	East end of state maintenance
Hollywood	18.15	29.21	US 1 (Federal Highway) – Fort Lauderdale, Miami	Young Circle (traffic circle); west end of state maintenance; (unsigned SR 5)
Hollywood	19.654– 19.897	31.630– 32.021	Intracoastal Waterway bridge	
Hollywood	19.939	32.089	SR A1A	Interchange
1.000 mi = 1.609 km; 1.000 km = 0.621 mi: Electronic toll collection
