= Merrick Park =

Merrick Park or Meyrick Park may refer to:

- Merrick Park (Springfield, Massachusetts), part of Springfield's Quadrangle
- Shops at Merrick Park, a shopping mall in Coral Gables, Florida
- Meyrick Park, Bournemouth, an area of Bournemouth
