= Island SPACE Caribbean Museum =

Pan-Caribbean heritage museum

Coordinates: 26°7′8.2″N 80°15′16.6″W

Island SPACE Caribbean Museum is the first and only brick and mortar pan-Caribbean heritage museum in the United States. Currently located at the Broward Mall in Plantation, Florida, the facility opened its doors in November 2020, during the COVID-19 pandemic. It is operated by the Florida-based 501(c)(3) nonprofit organization Island Society for the Promotion of Artistic and Cultural Education or Island SPACE.

== The facility ==
The museum has operated from two locations, both at the Broward Mall, since its founding. Its layout is based on three main zones of functionality: a historical archive, a fine art gallery, and event and activity spaces. The archive features information, artifacts and relics from Jamaica, The Bahamas, Haiti, Barbados, Cuba, Trinidad, Honduras, Guyana, Suriname, the U.S. Virgin Islands and other Caribbean countries. It is organized into four areas which showcase the history of the region, from pre-colonial times through slavery and emancipation. It then explores features of Caribbean life including economies, politics, religion, music and sports through the post-emancipation decades. Information about the connections between the Caribbean and America is also on display. Items on show include a costume worn by Jamaican dancehall artist Spice, an outfit worn by Jamaican reggae drummer Sly Dunbar, running shoes worn by Jamaican sprinter Usain Bolt, Over-the-Top Oakley glasses worn by Trinidadian sprinter Ato Boldon, and cricket bats signed by members of the West Indies cricket team.

The fine art gallery shows the work of Caribbean artists, established and emerging, and has featured names including Phillipe Doddard, JanJak Alexis, David I. Muir, Michelle Drummond, Sonya Sanchez Arias and Krystle Sadbul.

Events hosted have included workshops, panel discussions and cultural presentations on themes such as women’s rights, emancipation, marijuana and reggae music. In May 2022, the organization became the first Caribbean facility in South Florida to host an exhibition and event series in solidarity with the LGBTQ community, the Queer Caribbeans series of 2022.

== The nonprofit organization ==
South Florida is home to more than 1.5 million people who are Caribbean or of Caribbean descent. Island SPACE claims to be an organization dedicated to capturing and telling a comprehensive history of the Caribbean region, highlighting both common and unique themes and cultural practices. According to its stated mission: Island SPACE facilitates the creation of artistic, cultural and socially conscious initiatives that educate the public about the valuable contributions and positive significance of the Caribbean community. Its stated vision is to elevate the profile of Caribbean art, history and culture in every form throughout South Florida and the broader diaspora.

== History ==
After staging a number of small, temporary Caribbean culinary history exhibits at museums, libraries and cultural facilities throughout Broward County, Florida, co-founders Calibe Thompson and David Muir established the Island SPACE nonprofit organization in 2019, and in 2020, with a board of directors in place, they brought Island SPACE Caribbean Museum to the Broward Mall for a longer term installation. The facility remained in its first location, on the exterior of the mall, from November 2020 to December 2022. It moved to an interior location in January 2023. Its funding has been provided by grantors including the National Endowment for the Arts, Florida Cultural Division, Broward County Cultural Division and the Community Foundation of Broward, as well as private donors such as Florida Power & Light Company and GraceKennedy USA.
