= Miami International Mall =

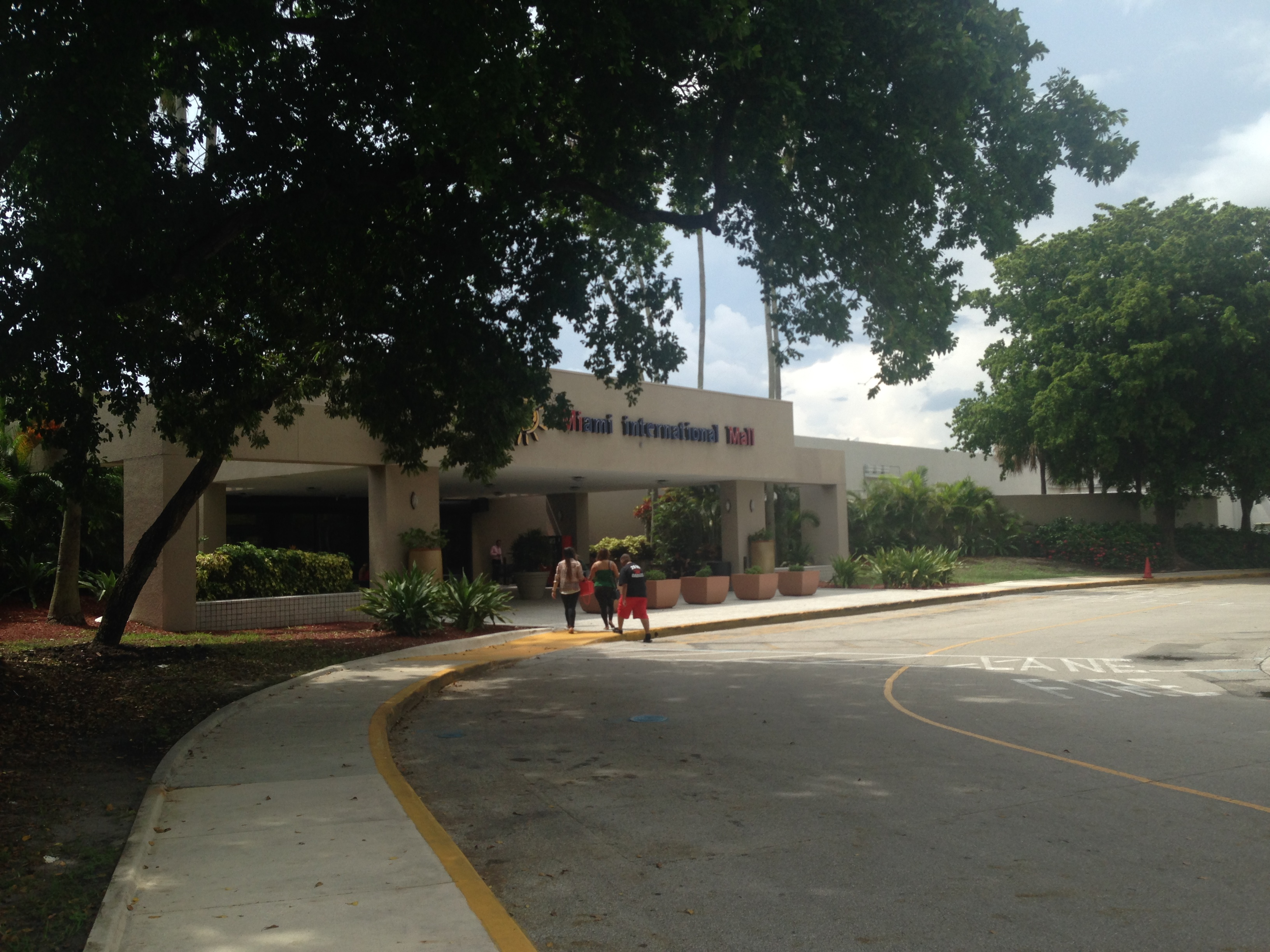
- East entrance between JCPenney and Elev8
- Location: Doral, Florida, United States
- Coordinates: 25.786638°N 80.364904°W
- Address: 1455 NW 107th Ave
- Opened: August 17, 1982; 44 years ago
- Developer: Edward J. DeBartolo Corp.
- Manager: Simon Property Group
- Owner: Simon Property Group (47.8%)
- Num. of stores: 130
- Num. of anchor tenants: 4
- Floor area: 1,082,555 square feet (100,572.7 m^{2})
- Floors: 1 (2 in anchors)
- Website: www.simon.com/mall/miami-international-mall

Miami International Mall is an enclosed shopping mall in Doral, Florida in the southwestern portion of the Miami metropolitan area, only half a mile away from the larger Dolphin Mall. The Miami International Airport is nearby, thus giving the mall its name. It was built by the Edward J. DeBartolo Corp. in 1982, and is currently managed by Simon Property Group, who owns 47.8% of it. The mall features retailers JCPenney, Macy's, and Macy's Men's Store. Elev8 Fun is under construction and looking to open in summer 2026.

== History ==
Built in 1982 and similar to Broward Mall four years earlier and Town Center at Boca Raton two years afterwards, the mall's original anchors were Burdines, Jordan Marsh, and Sears (the latter opened in July 1983 followed by Aventura Mall the next month). Lord & Taylor was added in 1985 (likewise done at Boynton Beach Mall).

Mervyn's, which replaced Lord & Taylor in 1991, was sold to Dillard's in 1997. Jordan Marsh was also husbanded and refashioned as a Burdines men's, home, and furniture location. J. C. Penney built a store in 1992 (as with Pembroke Lakes Mall).

In 2000, Miami International Mall underwent an extensive renovation and celebrated its "Grand re-opening" in 2001 when the nearby Dolphin Mall opened with an international theme. Just like the Boynton Beach Mall, the renovation included removing its old features (the trees, fountains, etc.), and making it a more modern looking mall. Burdines also added a second floor to their original store, now used for their women’s and children’s departments. Both Burdines stores became Macy's in 2005 as part of a nationwide transaction, and the Lord & Taylor/Mervyn’s/Dillard's building became Kohl's, September 28, 2011 (just like at Coral Square).

On August 23, 2018, it was announced that the Sears anchor store would close. Several perspective tenants are in the midst of early on discussions. One of the leading developments for the site involves turning the Sears site into a condominium or apartment complex. The planned development that moved forward became luxury apartments. This new mixed-use district would consist of a three-phase and six-story residential component. In 2026, phase one and phase two of the new development was submitted for review. These phases consist of the redevelopment of the former Sears site with the project being led by Greystar Development.

On January 10, 2024, it was announced that the Kohl's store would close on January 13, 2024. The building was sold to Elev8 Fun who announced that the building will become an Elev8 indoor adventure park as part of their ongoing expansion. As of 2026, it is under construction with a projected opening date of summer 2026.
