= The Shops at Sunset Place =

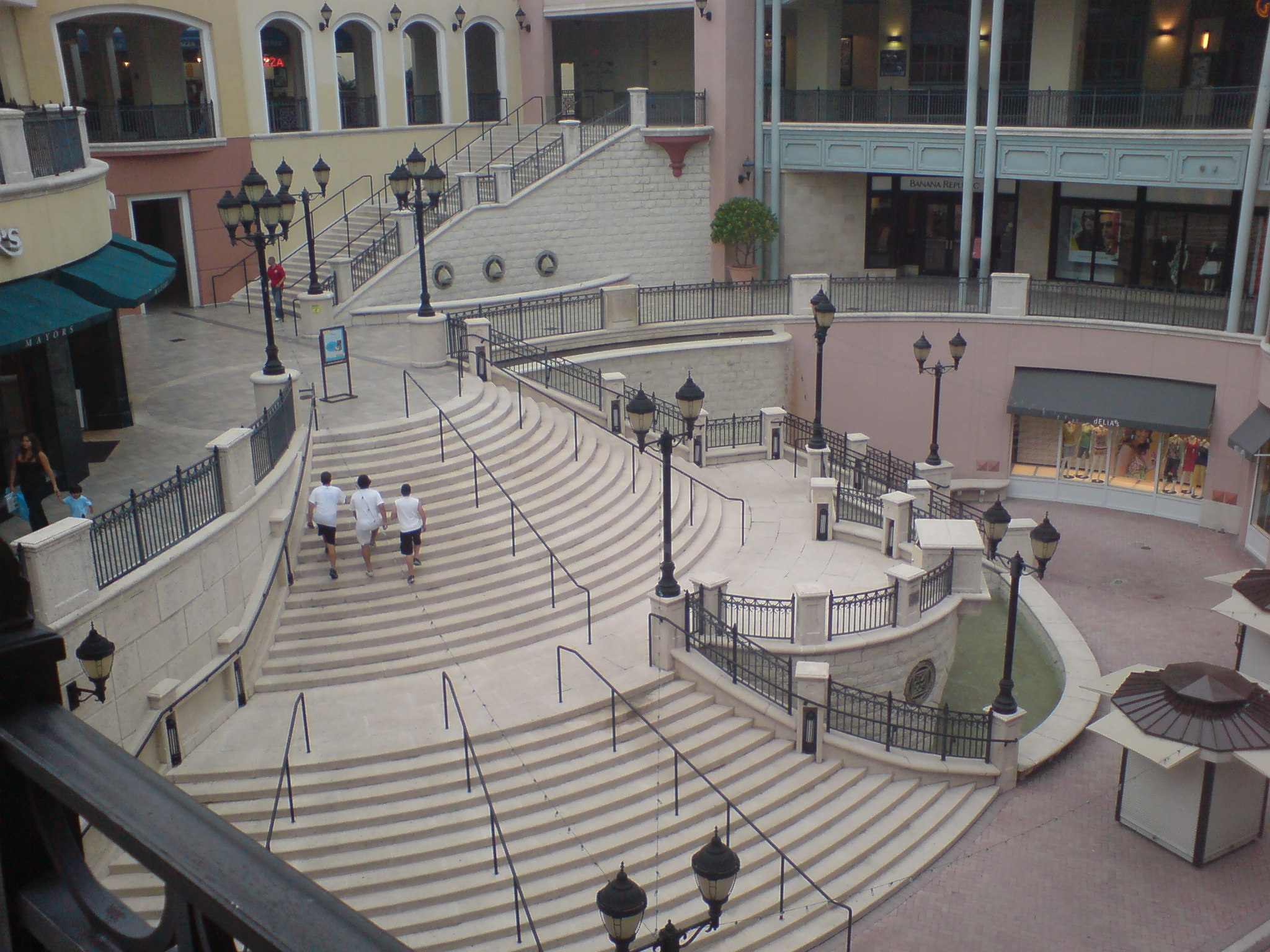
- Grand Staircase, 2008
- Location: South Miami, Florida, U.S.
- Coordinates: 25.7049°N 80.2862°W
- Opened: December 18, 1998
- Owner: Federal Realty; Grass River Property; Comras Company/Ana Sanz, MD
- Num. of stores: 60
- Floor area: 514,000 sq ft (47,800 m^{2}).
- Floors: 3
- Website: shopsunsetplace.com

The Shops at Sunset Place is an outdoor shopping mall in South Miami, Florida at the intersection of Dixie Highway (US 1) and Red Road (West 57th Avenue). The mall opened in 1999. It was owned by Federal Realty, Grass River Property, and Comras Company prior to 2021 acquisition by Midtown Opportunities.

The Shops at Sunset Place is serviced by the Miami Metrorail at the South Miami station. The station is located across the street from the shopping mall on the corner of Sunset Drive and US 1.

In 2014 the Shops at Sunset Place housed the Miami-area's only GameTime location, replacing the former GameWorks arcade. There was a Forever 21 across from a spot for a restaurant. A Splitsville Luxury Lanes and Dinner Lounge bowling alley was added in 2008. The largest tenant was a 24-screen cinema operated by AMC Entertainment with about 92,000 square feet (8,547 m^{2}).

Prior to the building of Sunset Place, the property was the site of The Bakery Centre, which opened in 1986 on the site of the old Holsum Bread Bakery. The Bakery Centre was a retail and office complex that included a 7-screen AMC Theatres multiplex. It was demolished in 1996.

In October 2015, Simon Property Group sold the mall to Federal Realty, Grass River Property, and the Comras Company for $110 million.

In January 2021 Midtown Opportunities acquired the Shops at Sunset Place for $65.5M, a $44.5 million loss for the sellers.

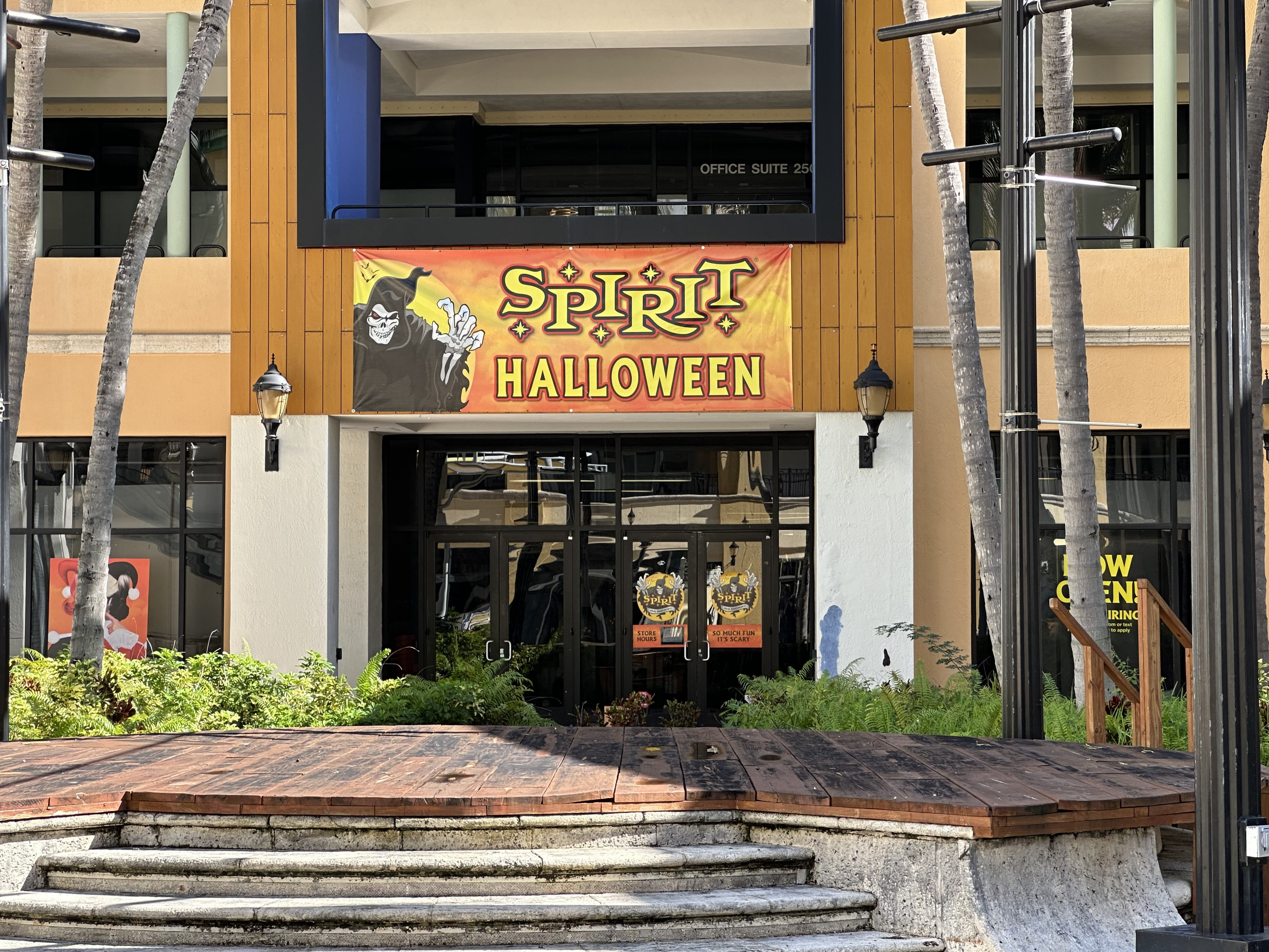
September 2023 - A Spirit Halloween was open in the mall.

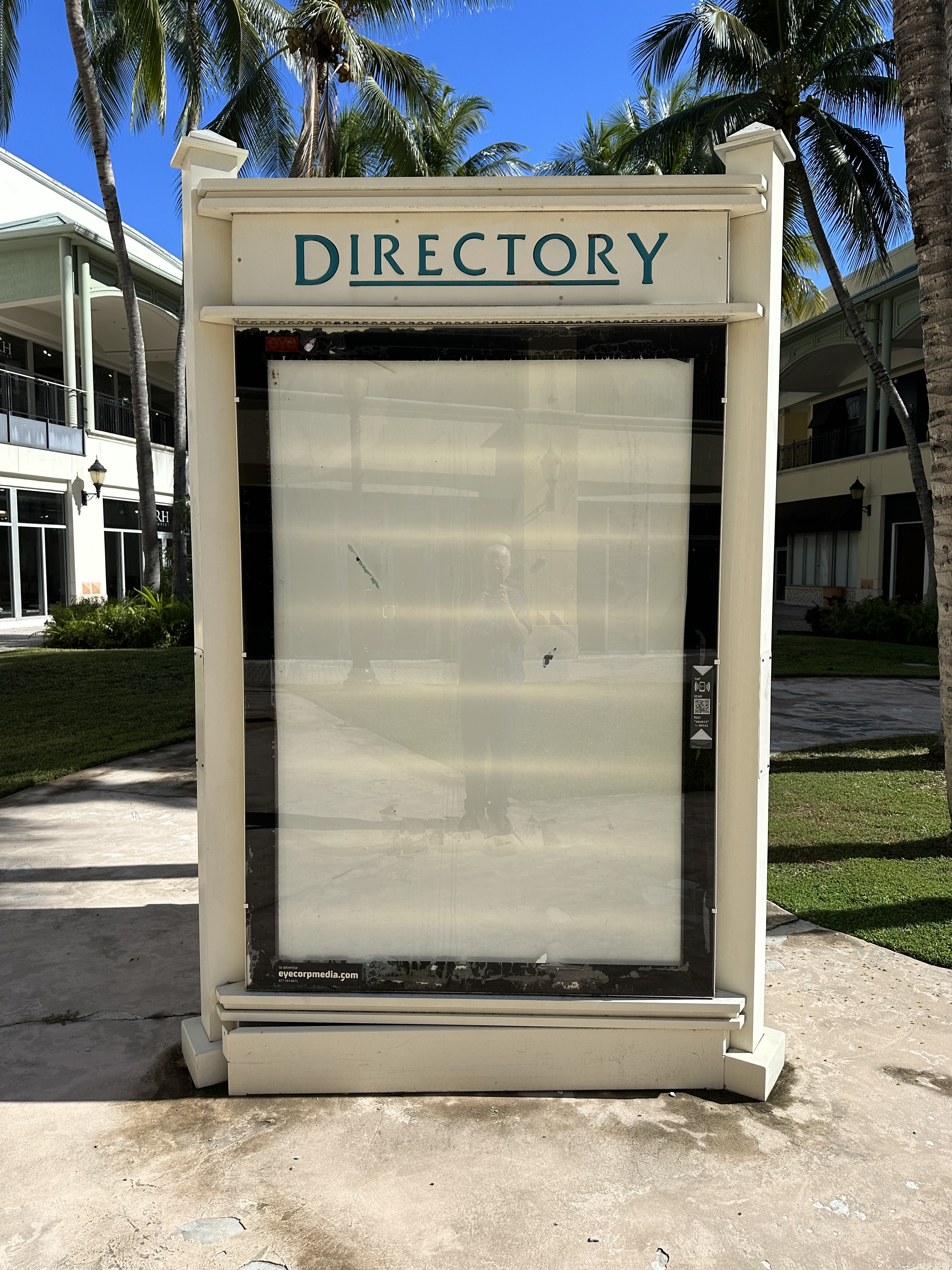
September 2023 - blank mall directory

== See also ==
- List of shopping malls in South Florida
