= Mesa Mall =

Shopping mall in Grand Junction, Colorado, United States

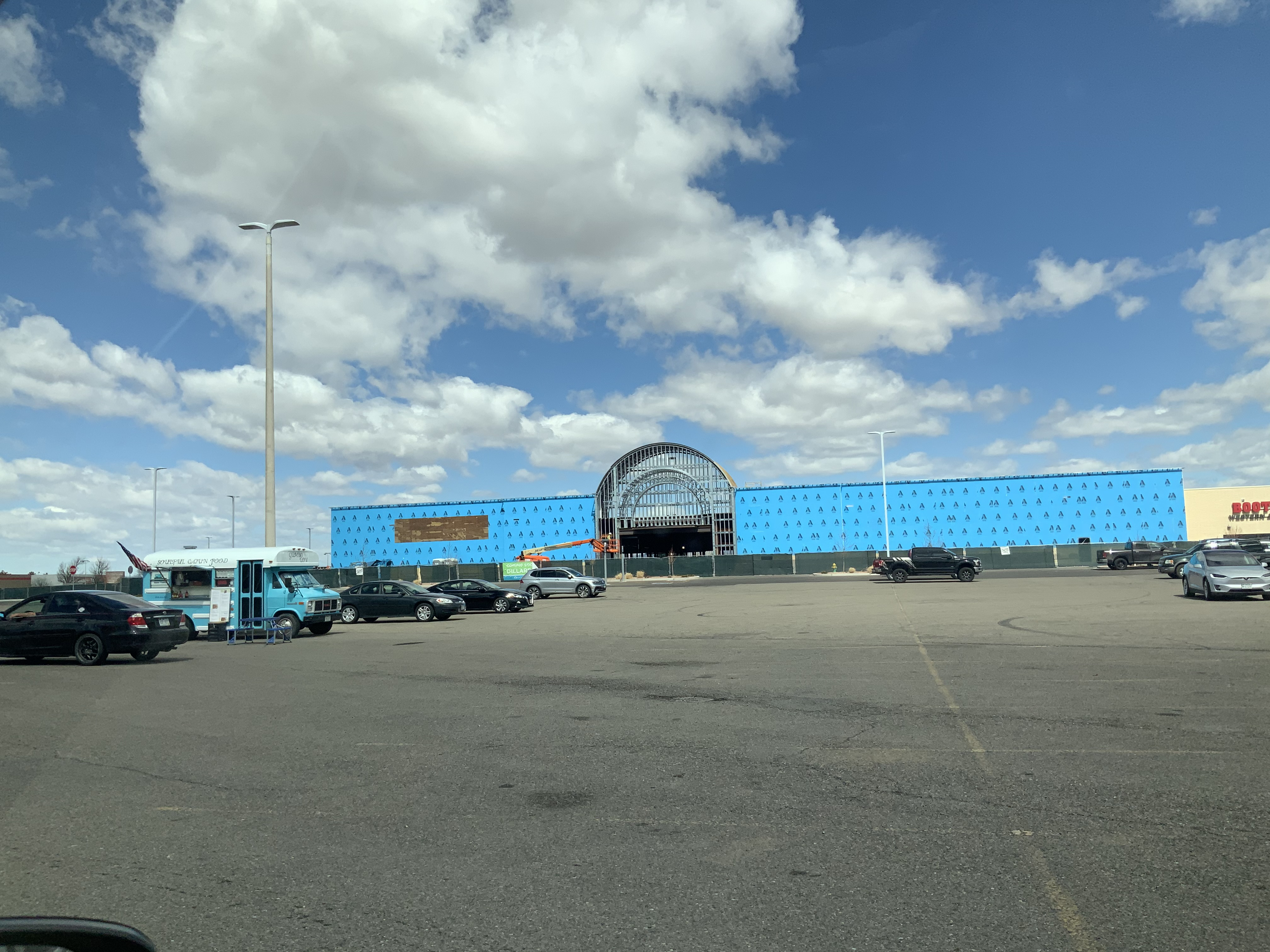
- Exterior of Mesa Mall (Dillard’s anchor store under construction in early 2021)
- Location: Grand Junction, Colorado
- Coordinates: 39°05′32″N 108°36′09″W
- Address: 2424 US Highway 6 and 50 Grand Junction, Colorado 81505
- Opened: 1980
- Developer: General Growth Properties
- Owner: CBL Properties
- Num. of stores: 120+
- Num. of anchor tenants: 6
- Floor area: 836,721 sq ft (77,733.9 m^{2}).
- Floors: 1
- Website: shopmesamall.com

Mesa Mall is a shopping mall in Grand Junction, Colorado, United States. Managed by CBL Properties, the mall's anchor stores are Bass Pro Shops, Dillard's, JCPenney, HomeGoods, Dick's Sporting Goods, and Target.

== History ==
General Growth Properties built Mesa Mall in 1980. The original anchor stores were JCPenney, Sears, and Target.

Mesa Mall was acquired by Macerich in 1997 in a joint venture purchase of 12 regional malls owned by the International Business Machine Corp.'s pension fund. The price was $974.5 million, including the assumption of $485 million of debt. Sales per square foot for the malls were heading for over $260 for 1997 with an occupancy at about 89%.

The mall was previously anchored by a Mervyn's which closed when the chain folded in 2008, it was replaced by Cabela's in 2010. The mall's sixth anchor store is HomeGoods, which was formerly Sports Authority.

On April 18, 2018, it was announced that Herberger's would be closing as parent company The Bon-Ton Stores was going out of business. The store closed on August 29, 2018.

On August 22, 2018, Sears announced that they would also be closing as part of a plan to close 46 stores nationwide. The store closed in November 2018.

On February 20, 2019, it was announced that the former Sears will be demolished for a Dillard's. It opened on October 6, 2021.

On January 28, 2021, it was announced that Dick's Sporting Goods will open up in the former Herberger's. The store opened on August 27, 2021.

In March 2021, HomeGoods opened in the former Sports Authority.

In July 2025, the mall was purchased by CBL Properties from after the previous owners, Washington Prime Group, filed for bankruptcy.

In 2025, Cabela's was rebranded to Bass Pro Shops.
