= Town Center at Boca Raton =

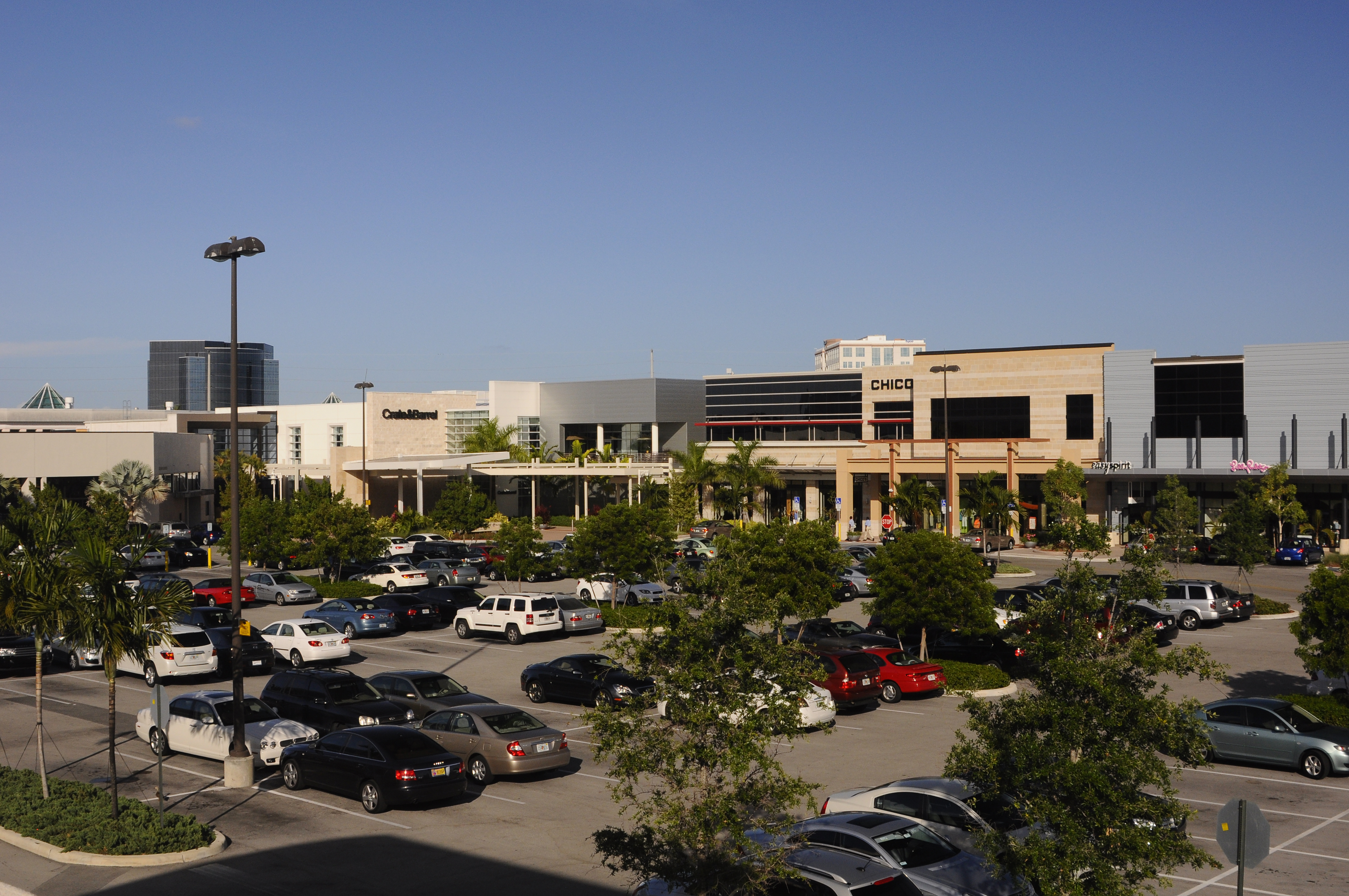
- Town Center at Boca Raton in 2009
- Location: Boca Raton, Florida, U.S.
- Coordinates: 26.365820°N 80.133551°W
- Address: 6000 Glades Road
- Opened: August 13, 1980; 46 years ago
- Developer: Arvida Corp., Homart Development Co., and Federated Stores Realty
- Manager: Simon Property Group
- Owner: Simon Property Group
- Architect: RTKL Associates
- Num. of stores: 206
- Num. of anchor tenants: 5
- Floor area: 1,778,660 square feet (165,243 m^{2})
- Floors: 1 (2 in outdoor terrace, Saks Fifth Avenue, Nordstrom and Neiman Marcus, 3 in Macy's and Bloomingdale's)
- Parking: 8,000
- Website: Official website

Town Center at Boca Raton, often referred to as Boca Town Center, Town Center Mall, or simply Town Center, is an upscale shopping mall located in Boca Raton, Florida, United States (approximately 30 miles south of West Palm Beach and 20 miles north of Fort Lauderdale). It has been owned and operated by Simon Property Group since 1998. The mall features Macy's, Nordstrom, Bloomingdale's, Neiman Marcus, and Saks Fifth Avenue.

The mall is the largest enclosed and conventional shopping mall in Palm Beach County, and is the third largest in total by square footage in South Florida, behind Sawgrass Mills and Aventura Mall.

== History ==
The mall opened on August 13, 1980, on a site just west of Interstate 95 directly on Glades Road. Originally, the one-story mall was anchored by Florida-based Burdines, which was constructed in June 1979, a year before the rest of the mall, including Jordan Marsh and Sears (debuted October 29, 1980) as the second and third anchors. This was a similar fashion to Broward Mall two years earlier and Miami International Mall two years later. At the time of opening, the mall had 100 stores and featured a Mediterranean Revival theme with a round black station clock, living vegetation below a series of atriums, and several distinctive wishing fountains. The mall was developed by Federated Stores, the parent company of Burdines, on land owned by Arvida Corp., serving as a retail hub for the flourishing western Boca Raton area prior to becoming a super-regional shopping center on its own right.

While the Sears, Bloomingdale's, and eventually Nordstrom locations remained the same throughout most of the mall's history, the other three anchor pads changed as a result of mergers, acquisitions, and relocations. In 1991, Jordan Marsh shut down due to Allied Stores and then was sold to Mervyns in 1992, which in turn closed in 1995 and was refurbished by a larger Saks Fifth Avenue, which had a two-year construction period until 1999 including a new second floor entrance to the new parking deck. This caused razing the original building to make way for another new concourse featuring Florida's first Nordstrom store in 2000. The mall was renovated as a result, and parking layouts were rearranged to allow a three-story parking garage at Nordstrom, and a two-story garage at the recently refurbished Burdines (now Macy's) and larger Saks (formerly JM). Lord & Taylor shuttered entirely in 2004 during a retreat into the Northeast, and was succeeded by Neiman Marcus, who wanted to be in Boca since 1987 and opened in 2005. The Burdines location was converted to Burdines-Macy's in 2003 and then simply Macy's also in 2005. Moreover, the food court's seating was reconfigured to accommodate more people, and a Waldenbooks (which closed in 2010) opened on its southern side. Mall entrances were remodeled with sun canopies and decorative towers to add exterior appeal. Another garage by Bloomingdale's and lifestyle center called the Terrace at Town Center were completed in 2007 featuring Crate & Barrel and Youfit Health Clubs. Macy's expanded again that same year, adding a third floor. The mixed-use development is between the expanded Bloomingdale's and the Nordstrom parking garage.

On January 4, 2018, it was announced that Sears would close its anchor store. A year later, Sears Holdings unveiled plans to redevelop the Sears site with a 250,000 square foot open air concept called The Collection at Boca Town Center. It will provide shopping, dining, and entertainment similar to the lifestyle center in Aventura Mall. Simon is attempting to block plans for the project, stating it violates a 1985 agreement with the mall for using the space for something other than traditional retail.

By 2023, since the government lockdown, Town Center at Boca Raton had announced several newest additions. The mall also features a 1,700 sq ft playground for children.

By 2025, Simon was able to block Sears Holdings and their successor Transformco from redeveloping the site. Transformco sold the former Sears store under Seritage Growth Properties to Simon for $23 million in 2025. In 2026, Simon made public plans to demolish and redevelop the former Sears building and site into a hotel, luxury apartments, retail, and restaurants. Part of this plan would involve constructing an eight-story hotel with 197 rooms, a seven-story tower with 374 luxury apartments, and a parking garage built between them. The development would be centered around a Main Street flanked by eight buildings with over 157,000 square feet (14585.8 m²) of retail and restaurant space. Simon submitted an application to develop the 31.6 acre site to the city of Boca Raton in 2026.

== Incidents ==
=== 2007 murders ===
In 2007, several murders at the mall drew national attention. In March, a 52-year-old woman was kidnapped and murdered. In December, 47-year-old Nancy Bochicchio and her 7-year-old daughter Joey were also kidnapped and later found bound and shot in the head in the woman's SUV in the mall parking lot. In addition, a similar incident occurred at the mall in August 2007, in which a Jane Doe and her 2-year-old son were kidnapped and tied up in their car by a male assailant after he forced the woman to make a cash withdrawal via an ATM.

This case was featured on America's Most Wanted and caused host John Walsh to say he believed a serial killer was active in the city. Though there is no forensic evidence to definitely establish the murders were committed by the same person, the similarities in the cases led police to believe they were related. The murders all remain unsolved.

Israel Keyes (1978–2012) was considered a possible suspect for the Boca murders.
