= Hollywood Fashion Center =

Coordinates: 26.007525°N 80.205544°W

- Location: Hollywood, Florida
- Opened: November 1, 1971
- Closed: 1993
- Developer: Ralph Biernbaum
- Architect: Robert W. Kahn Associates
- Num. of stores: 100+
- Num. of anchor tenants: 4
- Floor area: 907,626 square feet (84,321.2 m^{2})

Hollywood Fashion Center was a shopping mall located at the South East corner of Hollywood Boulevard (State Road 820) and US 441 (State Road 7) in Hollywood, Florida.

== History ==
The first store to open at the mall was anchor Burdines, which opened on October 5, 1970. The mall opened on November 1, 1971 with anchors Burdines, Jordan Marsh, J. C. Penney, and Richard's. Zayre opened at the mall in the former Richard's space in 1982.

The mall began a serious decline in the 1990s, as it rapidly lost anchors. Ames, which had been converted from Zayre in 1988, closed in 1990 with the chain's Chapter 11 bankruptcy filing. Jordan Marsh closed in 1991, and both Burdines and JCPenney closed and moved to the new Pembroke Lakes Mall in 1992, leaving the mall anchorless. The mall's owners, Hollytor Properties, filed for Chapter 11 bankruptcy in 1993, and the mall was sold to State Mutual Life Insurance for $4.7 million. By 1994, the mall had been closed.

In 1996, the mall was considered as the site for a new The Home Depot store, however these plans never came to fruition. Later that year the mall became home to a Smart & Final warehouse foods store, which later became a Gordon Food Service with their acquisition of Smart & Final's Florida stores in 2003.

For a brief period from 2002–2004 it served as an indoor flea market named Millennium SuperMall "Hollywood's City Place" until it was discovered many of the booths were selling stolen wares. It has been closed since then.

In March 2013, Walmart announced that they were purchasing the property and constructing a 185,000 square foot Walmart Supercenter. The demolition phase was completed in June, 2014. The Walmart Supercenter opened on April 21, 2016.

The Hollywood Fashion Center is not to be confused with Hollywood Plaza, formerly named Hollywood Mall and located about two miles east on Hollywood Boulevard.
