= Pompano Citi Centre =

- Location: Pompano Beach, Florida, United States
- Coordinates: 26.257783°N 80.102990°W
- Address: 2001 North Federal Highway
- Opened: January 1970; 56 years ago (original); 2006; 20 years ago (redevelopment)
- Developer: Leonard L. Farber, Inc.; Faison Enterprises, Inc. (redevelopment)
- Manager: Faison Enterprises, Inc.
- Owner: Sterling Organization
- Architect: Saltz Michelson Architects, Inc. (redevelopment)
- Num. of stores: 58
- Num. of anchor tenants: 9 (8 open, 1 vacant by fall 2020)
- Floor area: 138,546 square feet (12,871.3 m^{2})
- Floors: 3
- Website: www.pompanociticentre.com

Pompano Citi Centre is a primarily open-air shopping mall in Pompano Beach, Florida. The center consists of a big box retailer strip, in addition to a small lifestyle center section. The mall's main anchor stores are JCPenney, Lowe's, Ross Dress For Less, Nordstrom Rack (Coming Soon), and PetSmart. Burlington, TJ Maxx, and Five Below will move into the former Sears with both stores scheduled to open in fall 2020.

== History ==
Pompano Fashion Square was originally developed by Leonard L. Farber, Inc. in 1970 as the first regional shopping hub in Broward County. The enclosed mall's original anchors were 2 level Burdines, Sears, and JCPenney stores and a 1-story Jordan Marsh. This configuration of three bilevel anchors with an additional single level anchor was eventually duplicated at other malls in Broward: Coral Square (1984) and Pembroke Lakes Mall (1992). The center was renamed Pompano Square and renovated in 1985 to better compete with newer shopping centers in the area, including Coral Square. Jordan Marsh became Mervyn's in 1992 which gave the mall the same offering as the then-new Pembroke Lakes Mall. Mervyn's in turn closed in 1997 and the building was purchased by Dillard's. A Dillard's never materialized and the site remained vacant until it was demolished in 2003 for Lowe's which opened a year later. By the early 2000s, however, Pompano Square was a dead mall. Interest in redevelopment surfaced in 2004, and Faison revitalized the center into the current format in 2006. Earlier, Burdines merged with Macy's in 2003 and rebranded the store as Macy's, while in 2005 JCPenney downsized.

Sterling Organization purchased the mall from Faison in 2012. A carousel was added in 2012 in front of JCPenney as entertainment. The new owners worked to rebrand including a new website, bringing lively events to the mall and to fill the mall with more exciting tenants. Sears sold its store to Sterling on January 2, 2018, presenting an opportunity to redevelop the store, which closed on December 16, 2018.

On January 8, 2020, it was announced that Macy's would close in April 2020 as part of a plan to close 125 stores nationwide.
