= Pembroke Lakes Mall =

Shopping mall in Broward County, Florida, U.S.

- Location: Pembroke Pines, Florida, United States
- Address: 11401 Pines Blvd
- Opened: October 28, 1992; 34 years ago
- Developer: Homart Development Company
- Manager: GGP
- Owner: GGP
- Num. of stores: 153
- Num. of anchor tenants: 7
- Floor area: 1,135,374 square feet (105,479.7 m^{2})
- Floors: 1 (2 in Dillard's Women and Children, JCPenney, main Macy's, Round, 5 in parking garage)
- Website: www.pembrokelakesmall.com

Pembroke Lakes Mall, often referred to as Pines Mall or Pembroke Lakes, is an enclosed shopping mall located in Pembroke Pines, Florida, a suburb of Fort Lauderdale. Located on the intersection of State Road 820 (Pines Boulevard) and State Road 823 (Flamingo Road), it is in between Interstate 75 and Florida's Turnpike. Owned and managed by Brookfield Properties, the mall was opened in 1992, and has 1,135,374 square feet (105,479.7 m^{2}) on one floor. As of 2018, Pembroke Lakes is one of South Florida's most popular malls. The anchor stores are Round1 Bowling & Arcade, AMC Theatres, 2 Dillard's stores, JCPenney, and 2 Macy's stores.

== History ==
Pembroke Lakes Mall was originally developed by Homart Development Company in 1992 as their third and final property, and the last regional shopping hub in Broward County. The enclosed retail complex included four anchors: two-level Burdines, Sears, and JCPenney stores and a 1-story Mervyn's, bringing the same offering as Pompano Fashion Square (1970). While JCPenney opened within the mall on October 28 of that year (along with another at Miami International Mall), Burdines, Mervyn's, and Sears all preceded a month before on September 19, 21, and 30, respectively.

The JCPenney and Burdines stores replaced their stores at Hollywood Fashion Center while Sears relocated from the Hollywood Mall. In August 1995, the mall added its first Dillard's store, located between Sears and the main entrance, Dillard's second in South Florida (the first was at The Galleria at Fort Lauderdale) and the mall's fourth multi-level store, making Pembroke Lakes the second mall in Broward with this initial anchor format, after Coral Square (1984) six years earlier. Only two years later, Dillard's expanded into the Mervyn's store for a second location, housing the men's and home departments, thus reconfiguring their existing store for ladies and children's clothing.

Burdines merged with Macy's in 2003 becoming simply Macy's in 2005. Shortly thereafter, in 2006, a second Macy's was added between their original location and the food court, housing men's and home departments, converting the original Burdines to women's and children. A four-story parking garage was also added next to both Macy's stores.

In 2016, GGP announced that the mall's Sears (later closing on September 15, 2019) would shrink to make room for an AMC movie theater, which opened in 2017. In Q3 2019, Round One Entertainment announced their first (and so far only) Florida location would open in the former Sears with a planned opening date of Spring 2021. Due to the ongoing pandemic, construction was severely delayed. Round One officially opened to the public on June 11, 2022.
