= Twin City Mall =

Coordinates: 26.8059°N 80.0568°W

- Location: North Palm Beach, Florida and Lake Park, Florida
- Opened: 1971
- Closed: 1991
- Developer: Food Fair Properties
- Num. of anchor tenants: 2
- Floors: 1

Twin City Mall was an enclosed shopping mall in North Palm Beach, Florida and Lake Park, Florida.

== History ==
Twin City Mall was first proposed in early 1969, and was a project of Food Fair Properties. The mall, built at the border between North Palm Beach and neighboring Lake Park, connected an existing J.M. Fields and Food Fair with a new Sears store. The mall had its grand opening on July 21, 1971, with 35 stores ready for opening day. Other major tenants included a Fountain's department store, a G. C. Murphy, and a theater operated by Budco Theatres, noted as the first in the Palm Beach area with an automated projection system. The mall was also noted for its extremely colorful interior, featuring hues of green, orange, and purple lit by circular skylights.

The J.M. Fields chain of stores closed in 1978 and the Twin City Mall location was taken over by Jefferson Stores the next year.

=== Decline ===
Fountain's would announce its closure at the mall in July 1983, at which time mall manager Ralph Downs acknowledged that "Twin Cities Mall had grown 'shabby,' with a leaky roof, bad paint, and air conditioning troubles". Jefferson's would announce its closure in August 1985, with Builders Square announced to fill the space later that year, though it would not open into the mall. Additionally, G. C. Murphy would close its doors on December 26 that year. In 1986, the Palm Beach Post would say that "the Twin City Mall has been met with a mixed reaction over its wild coloring (recently redone in more subdued tones), poor layout (existing stores were connected by a new mall), dark lighting, and disparate interior.".

Sears would close their store at the mall in 1988, after opening a new store at The Gardens Mall on October 1. Bill Thompson, district sales manager for mall tenant Endicott Johnson Shoes, told The Palm Beach Post in September that "The mall is slowly drying up... When Sears pulls out that will be the final nail in the coffin.". The mall was, at this time, about 50% vacant. Sears would open a clearance outlet in their former space at Twin City in December 1989, however it was noted by a Sears spokesman that the operation was only to utilize the property until they could find a buyer, and how long the outlet would be open depended on who bought the property.

Robert and Marjorie Somes, owners of the Ox Bow Gift Shop and Ox Bow Toys & Tops stores at the mall, filed a lawsuit against the mall's owners Larami Investments for failing to maintain or promote the mall in August 1990. A "task force" of officials from both North Palm Beach and Lake Park was formed in June 1991 to come up with ideas to improve or redevelop the "deteriorating, unsightly Twin City Mall". Builders Square, which operated on the North Palm Beach side of the mall, announced its closure in late 1991. Potential plans for the mall included a temporary campus for the Florida Atlantic University, or as a mixed use site with offices and retail, neither of which came to fruition.

Plans were first submitted in July 1995 to demolish and redevelop the mall as a traditional shopping center. Demolition had begun by December 1996, with demolition to be completed by January 1997. Prospective tenants for the redeveloped center included Winn-Dixie, Blockbuster Video, RadioShack, and Eckerd Pharmacy. The plans would be delayed by several years, with the redevelopment, now called Northlake Promenade Shoppes, not opening until August 2000. Tenants of the new center included Publix, Supercuts, Dollar Stop, Sally Beauty Supply, and Mailboxes Etc. The final portion to be redeveloped was the shopping center portion, last anchored by Builders Square and Hyde Park Market, the latter of which closed in 1999. It would be redeveloped in 2003 as the Village Shoppes, by local developer Carl Sabatello.
