= C. B. Smith Park =

Public park in Pembroke Pines, Florida

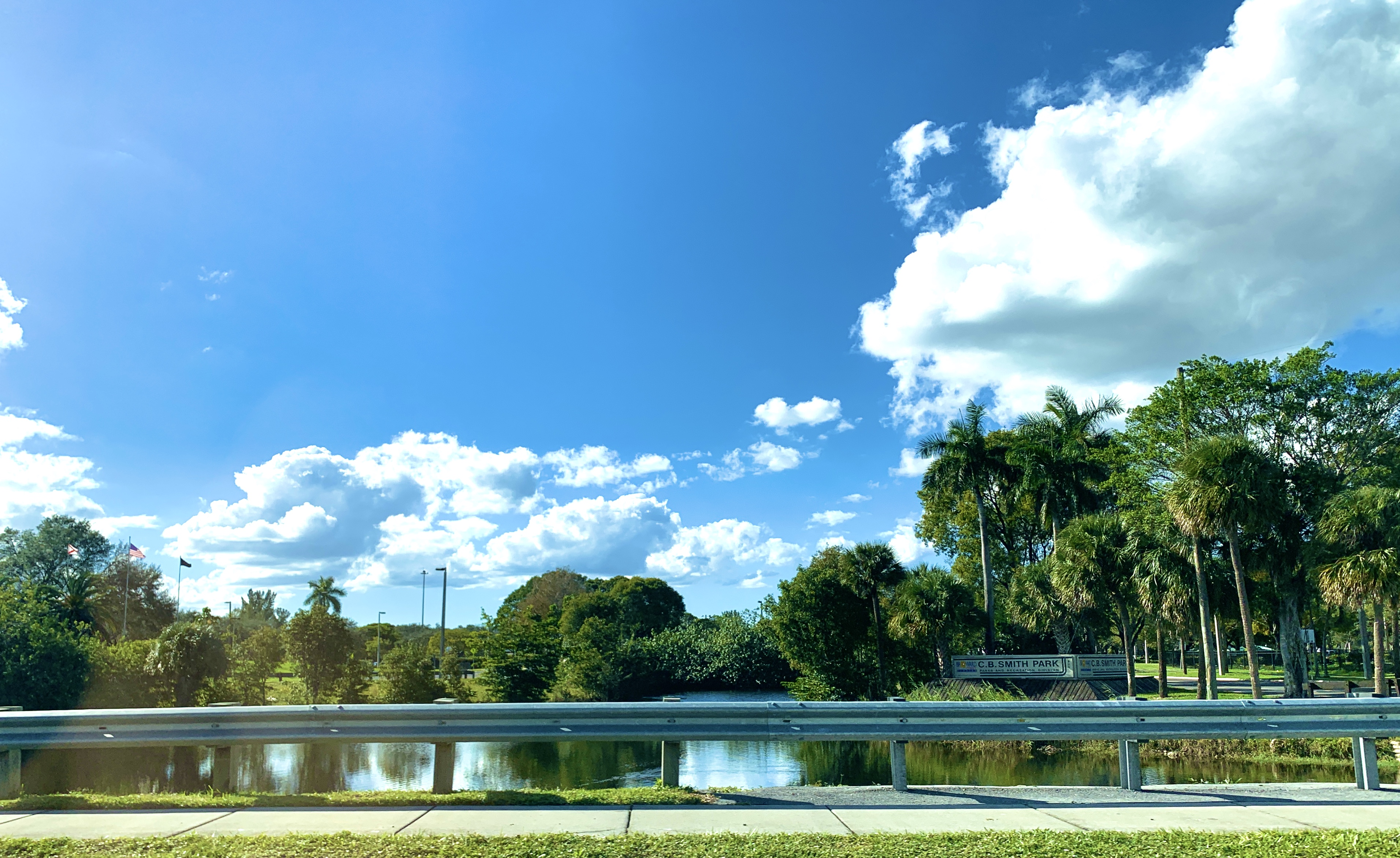

- Location within Florida
- Interactive map of C. B. Smith Park
- Location: Pembroke Pines, Florida
- Coordinates: 26°00′54″N 80°18′58″W
- Area: 299 acres (121 ha)
- Created: 1959
- Website: www.broward.org/Parks/CBSmithPark/Pages/Default.aspx

C. B. Smith Park is a public park located in Pembroke Pines, Florida. The park is 299 acres (1,210,000 m^{2}) in area and contains a water park known as "Paradise Cove", which is open seasonally. C. B. Smith Park offers many amenities and sporting activities including fishing, basketball, batting cages, miniature golf, as well as tennis and racquetball courts.

C.B. Smith Park also has an area that is home to the endangered Burrowing Owl.

== History ==
C.B. Smith Park was originally a plot of land that was purchased in 1959 by Broward County from the U.S. Government. Before the purchase, it was known as Snake Creek Park and was a firing range for a gunnery school during World War II. In 1967 it was renamed in honor of Commissioner Charles Barney Smith, who served the Broward County and the City of Hollywood Commission.

== Attractions ==
Paradise Cove is the water park at C.B. Smith that is open seasonally with blackout dates during certain times of each month. It features four 50-foot-tall water slides, Sharky's Lagoon, a water playground for all ages, Parrot's Point, a water playground for children 5 and under and Crazy Creek, a 410-foot-long lazy river. The park also has the following features: basketball, batting cages, biking/jogging/walking paths, campground, fishing, fitness facility, golf, horseshoes, miniature golf, picnic areas, playground, racquetball/tennis, shelter rental and volleyball.

== Events ==
The 99.9 KISS Country Chili CookOff was a large daylight music festival and chili competition in South Florida before the event moved to a different outdoor South Florida venue after the Global Pandemic. The ticketed event began in 1986 and was typically held each late January with a changing variety of famous country artists.
