= Broward Mall =

Coordinates: 26°7′3″N 80°15′17″W

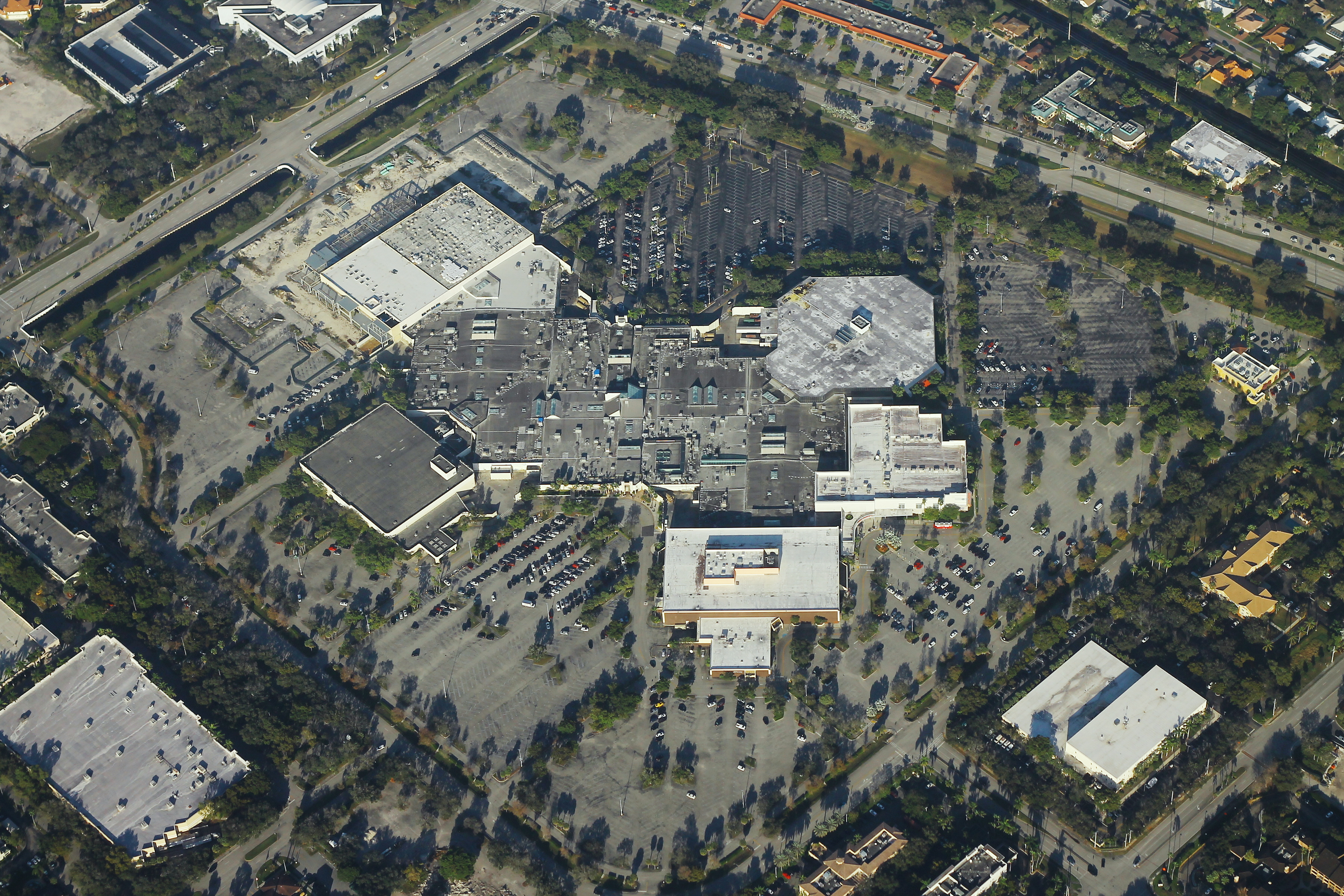
- Aerial image of the mall (2021)
- Location: Plantation, Florida
- Opened: 1978; 48 years ago
- Previous names: Westfield Broward (2007-2021)
- Developer: Arvida Corp., Homart Development Company, and Federated Stores Realty
- Manager: Spinoso Real Estate Group
- Architect: RTKL Associates
- Num. of stores: 87
- Num. of anchor tenants: 4 (3 open, 1 vacant)
- Floor area: 1,000,000 square feet (93,000 m^{2})
- Floors: 1 (2 in anchors)
- Website: visitbrowardmall.com

Broward Mall (formerly Westfield Broward) is a shopping mall in Plantation, Florida. It is anchored by Dillard's, JCPenney, Macy's, and a 12 screen Regal Cinemas.

== History ==
The mall was opened in August 1978, with the name Broward Mall. Original anchors were Burdines, Sears, and Jordan Marsh (the latter made its debut in November), in a similar manner to Town Center at Boca Raton (1980) and Miami International Mall (1982). JCPenney was constructed a year later.

Today, it has popular department stores and anchors including Dillard's (in the former JM/Mervyn’s spot), JCPenney, Macy's (née Burdines), and Regal Cinemas.

The mall was previously owned by the Westfield Group, which acquired it in 2007 from SPG-FCM Ventures, a 50/50 joint venture between an entity owned by Simon Property Group and funds managed by Farallon Capital Management; SPG-FCM Ventures had acquired the previous owner, Mills Corporation, earlier that year.

Mills had acquired it from Cadillac Fairview Corporation of Toronto in 2003.

On February 28, 2013, it was announced a 12-screen Regal Cinemas was opened in the mall in December 2013.

In 2015, Sears Holdings spun off 235 of its properties, including the Sears at Westfield Broward, into Seritage Growth Properties.

In 2017, the size of the Sears store was reduced by half and other shops were opened in the space, including Noire the Nail Bar; the Sears store closed in 2018. The first and the second floor of the former Sears is expected to become Powerhouse Gym and Game Time.

In June 2021, the owner Unibail-Rodamco-Westfield announced that it would be turning ownership of the mall over to its lenders after it was revealed the value of the mall had dropped below the outstanding loan on the property and that owner had stopped making payment on its loan. The Westfield name dropped shortly after the ownership of the property was transferred, returning to its original name of Broward Mall.

In October 2026, Spinoso Real Estate Group began providing leasing and management services for the mall.

== See also ==
- Town Center at Boca Raton
- The Galleria at Fort Lauderdale
