= Mervyn's =

American department store chain

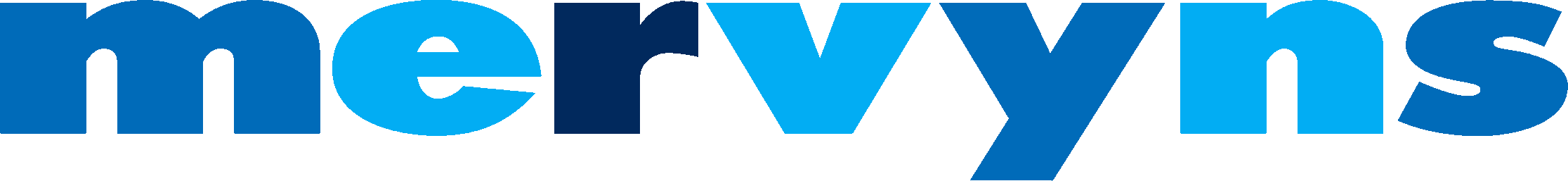
- Type: Private
- Industry: Retail
- Founded: July 29, 1949; 77 years ago San Lorenzo, California, U.S.
- Founder: Mervin G. Morris
- Defunct: December 31, 2008; 17 years ago (original company)
- Fate: Chapter 7 Bankruptcy Liquidation Sale
- Headquarters: Hayward, California, U.S.
- Area served: Western United States
- Key people: John Goodman (CEO, 2008)
- Products: Clothing, footwear, jewelry, bedding, bath, furniture, beauty products, electronics, toys, and housewares.
- Owner: Target Corporation (formerly Dayton-Hudson Corporation) (1978–2004); Sun Capital Partners (2004–2009); Unknown (2024 - present)
- Website: https://mervynsonline.com/

Mervyn's was an American middle-scale department store chain that was based in Hayward, California, and founded by Mervin G. Morris (1920–2021). It carried national brands of clothing, footwear, bedding, bath products, furniture, jewelry, beauty products, electronics, toys, and housewares. Many of the company's stores were opened in shopping malls; however, some locations were operated independently. Based on 2005 revenue, Mervyn's was the 83rd largest retailer in the United States.

In 2006, Mervyn's had 189 stores in 10 states. One year later, after Mervyn's closed its stores in Oregon and Washington, Mervyn's had reduced its store count to 177 stores in seven states. On October 17, 2008, the company announced that it would liquidate its assets through a Chapter 7 filing, planning to close every remaining location by the end of the year. The Morris family bought back the intellectual property rights to the company in 2009 and announced plans to relaunch Mervyn's as an internet-based enterprise. As of 2024, Meryvn's Department Store has returned as an online only store that specializes in selling closeout and overstock merchandise from other retailers.

== History ==
=== Beginnings ===
Final version of Mervyns' original logo, that was used from early 1962 until late 1994

Mervin G. Morris founded the first Mervyn's store in San Lorenzo, California, on July 29, 1949. The store was supposed to be named Mervin's, but a designer suggested that a spelling with a "y" instead of an "i" would be more visually appealing. Mervyn's was located in the midst of San Lorenzo Village, a planned residential community between the cities of Hayward and San Leandro, composed of two- and three-bedroom tract homes built between 1944 and the 1950s. Mervyn's carved a niche for itself by having a relatively no-frills shopping environment that reduced overhead, enabling the store to price merchandise lower than competing department stores. Mervyn's also offered significantly-discounted factory seconds of basics such as jeans, T-shirts, underwear, and similar garments, as well as household linens, with flaws minor and undetectable by most. During the 1950s and 1960s, this made Mervyn's popular with the young suburban families comprising the majority of San Lorenzo's population. This marketing strategy was later abandoned before Mervyn's expanded beyond its original single location, but Mervyn's remained popular as a lower-priced alternative to national department store chains.

The second Mervyn's store opened about 15 miles (24 km) south as an anchor tenant of the Fremont Hub Shopping Center, one of two regional malls in Fremont, California, in 1962.

=== Target years and expansion ===
Mervyns' logo used from 1994 to 2004.

In mid-1975, Mervyn's operated stores in major cities and towns throughout California., and by October, it had expanded to Southern California, opening stores in Fullerton and Huntington Beach. The location in Millbrae was particularly popular among San Francisco Peninsula customers searching for deals on off-season discount items.

By 1978, the company had grown to a chain of more than 50 stores in three states, and Mervyn's was acquired by the Dayton-Hudson Corporation (now Target Corporation). Mervyn's kept its separate identity as a Dayton Hudson subsidiary. The average store had 80–130 employees. There was a Store Team Leader (1), Executive Team Leaders (2–4), Department Leaders (7–10), benefited team members (full-time employees not part of the leadership team), and part-time employees. All employees had "credit goals", which referred to the number of customers that opened a Mervyn's credit account. Part-time employees were expected one per every eight hours, and the leadership team was expected one per every 40 hours.

Mervyn's entered Florida in 1988 with a store at Lakeland Square Mall in Lakeland, and began major expansions outside of California with Atlanta being the site of a particularly strong expansion campaign, followed by Miami in 1991 with the conversion of five Lord & Taylor locations--Cutler Ridge Mall (1982), Coral Square (1984), Miami International Mall, Boynton Beach Mall (both 1985), and Treasure Coast Square (1987). Mervyn's had not previously had a retail presence in the southern U.S., taking over a handful of Jordan Marsh sites in 1992 (along with a newly built store at Pembroke Lakes Mall). They also competed for mall space with JCPenney, which later received top anchor spots at the Town Center Mall in Kennesaw, Shannon Mall in Union City (rebuilt as a DHL Distribution Center), and Gwinnett Place Mall in Duluth (now Beauty Master). Stores that were unaffected were those at North Dekalb Mall in Decatur that was taken over by Upton's (Burlington Coat Factory now occupies the store) and North Point Mall in Alpharetta, which became Parisian and was rebuilt as AMC Theatres. This was also likewise done at the same time in Florida where the company sold ten stores to Dillard's, including the 5 aforementioned L&T stores, along with former JM boxes at Pompano Fashion Square, Broward Mall, and Melbourne Square in Melbourne, and 2 others (Lakeland Square and Pembroke Lakes), the latter three locations became "double headers" for Dillard's. The eight other Florida stores weren't included in the deal and were sold to other retailers. Mervyn's had withdrawn from both Miami and Atlanta in 1997. During the 1990s, Mervyn's also expanded into Arizona, Colorado, Texas, Michigan, Minnesota, and Washington.

=== Mervyn's California; sale from Target ===
Mervyn's California logo that was used from 1995 until early 2001.

From 1995 to 2001, the stores were rebranded as Mervyn's California, in an effort to identify with its West Coast roots. A media campaign was launched to publicize the rebranding, with TV commercials and catalogs featuring former San Francisco 49ers' quarterback Joe Montana. The rebranding had little effect on the company's revenues, and the "California" was dropped from the name in 2001, reverting to the original name. The majority of their stores in Texas didn't even consider adding the "California" name to their stores.

In March 2004, Target Corporation announced that they planned to put the Mervyn's and Marshall Field's divisions up for sale to focus on Target stores. Target Corporation was approached by many buyers for both stores but many of the potential buyers saw value only in the real estate. Target refused to sell to the groups that wanted to purchase Mervyn's for the property value only. Target would only consider deals that would not close the company and put the then 30,000 employees out of work.

The Mervyn's locations in Minnesota were closed in 2004 as part of the deal between Target Corporation selling their Marshall Field's division to The May Department Stores Company in June 2004. May purchased 9 Twin Cities area Mervyn's locations along with the Marshall Field's stores, and immediately announced closure of those Mervyn's stores. Analysts saw this as a move by the May Company to block competition from acquiring those locations. In July 2004, Target Corporation announced that Mervyn's had been sold to a group of investors that included private investment firm and turnaround specialist Sun Capital Partners, Cerberus Capital Management, and real estate investment company Lubert-Adler Management Inc. Rick Leto was named the new president and chief merchandising officer in January 2005.

=== Store closures prior to bankruptcy ===
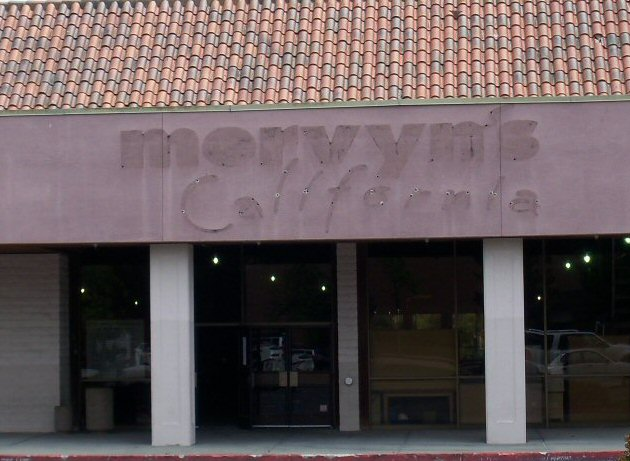
An empty Mervyn's California store in Capitola, California (store #36).

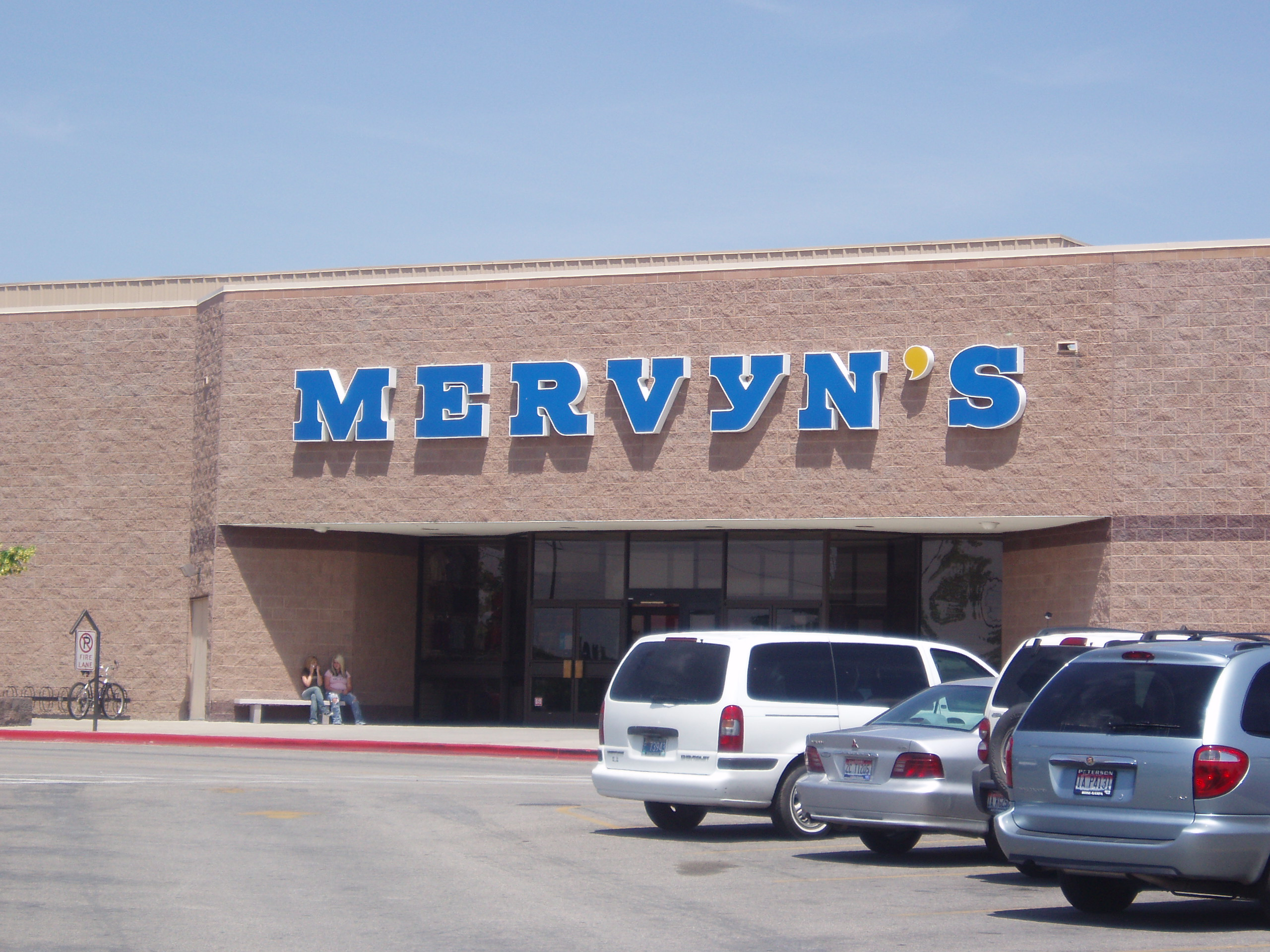
A typical 1980s Mervyn's exterior storefront, this one being in Boise, Idaho (store #220).

Sixty-two store closures were announced by the new owners in September 2005, stating the 62 stores closed only accounted for 17% of the chain's sales. The closures comprised 28 of the 40 stores in Texas, 15 stores in Michigan, 10 stores in Colorado, three stores in Oklahoma, 3 stores in Louisiana; and one store closing in each state of Utah, Oregon, and California. Mervyn's had an enviable real estate portfolio, and it was believed they could further invest in those properties, and make themselves more competitive.

In 2007, an additional 18 stores were closed. Of the stores closed, 17 were in Oregon and Washington, and one in Grand Junction, Colorado, which was the last remaining Mervyn's store in that state.

=== Bankruptcy and store closures ===
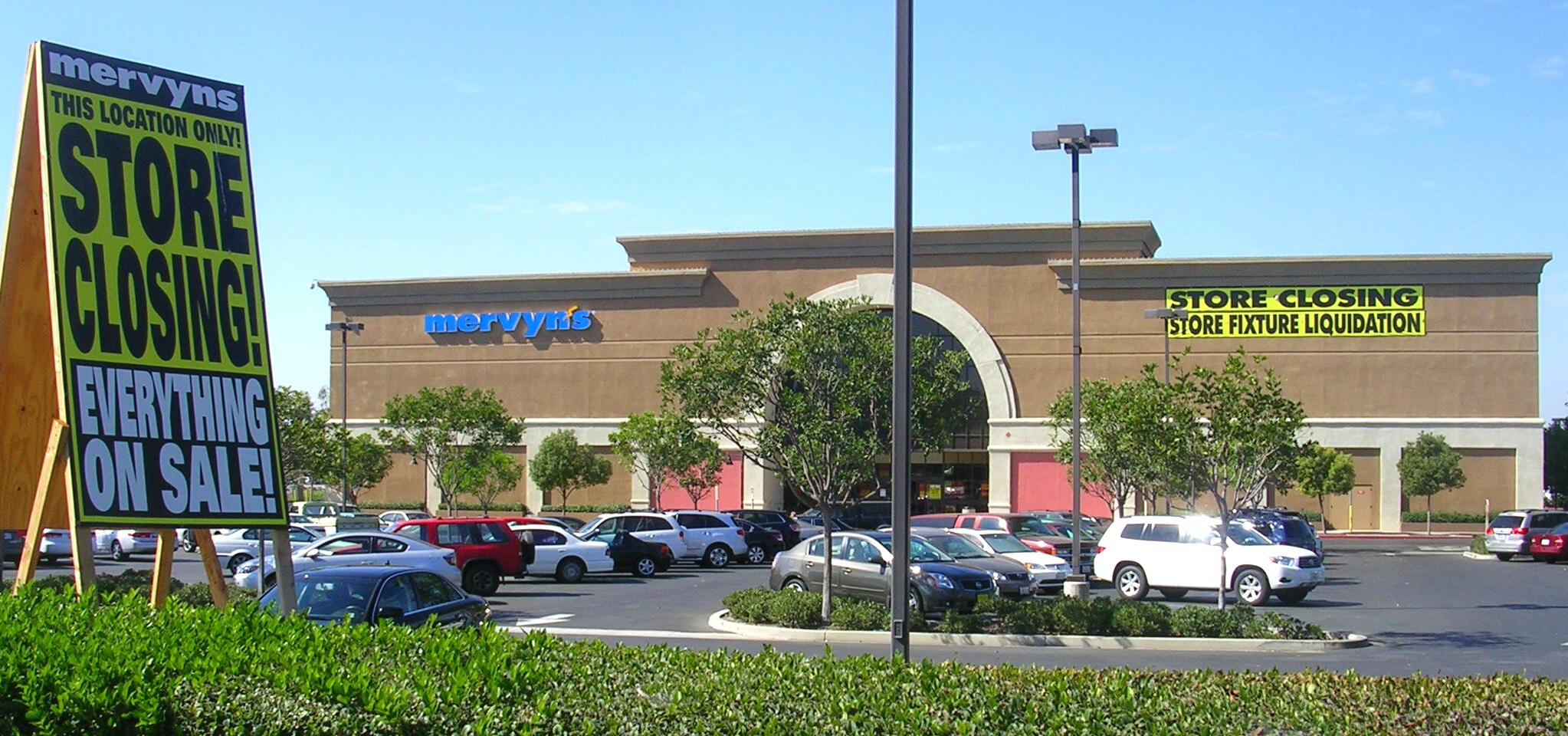
Mervyn's bankruptcy prompted the company to liquidate remaining store merchandise through dramatic clearance sales in late 2008, seen at this location in Irvine, California (store #194).

Signs of financial distress and possible bankruptcy surfaced on July 21, 2008, when the Associated Press reported that Mervyn's had stopped updating its financial status and that the department store's vendors ceased shipping some products, hurting the store's back-to-school season sales efforts. In addition, financing requests were denied by lenders. This raised the possibility of the company having to file for Chapter 11 bankruptcy, or going out of business altogether.

The company made no official comments at the time, but on July 29, 2008, Mervyn's announced that it had filed for Chapter 11 bankruptcy protection in the United States Bankruptcy Court for the Northern District of California. Both the ongoing Great Recession and declining consumer sales proved to be the main reasons for the bankruptcy. Soon, the Chapter 11 case was converted to Chapter 7 liquidation on October 17, 2008. At the time of that announcement, 3 stores had just held grand openings only a few months prior to being told they would soon close.

Although the company initially vowed to keep all locations open during the reorganization efforts, the company announced in August 2008 the closure of all 26 underperforming stores. The company hired an outside company to assist in the liquidation of assets from the stores affected. The closures also marked a complete retreat by Mervyn's from the Idaho market, whose sole store in Boise was one of the ones marked for closure. In Texas, a complete retreat was slated from San Antonio, where all three remaining stores were marked for closure, in addition to the closure of the sole stores in Lubbock, Midland, and Odessa.

After these closures, Mervyn's was left with about 150 stores: 16 in Arizona, 121 in California, three each in Nevada and New Mexico, seven in Texas and six in Utah.

In September 2008, Mervyn's sued the financial institutions involved in the leveraged buyout of the chain, alleging that the deal had stripped the retailer of its real estate assets, forcing it into bankruptcy. Mervyn's said in the suit that Cerberus Capital Management and its partners had used the increased rent to finance the buyout.

=== Liquidation ===
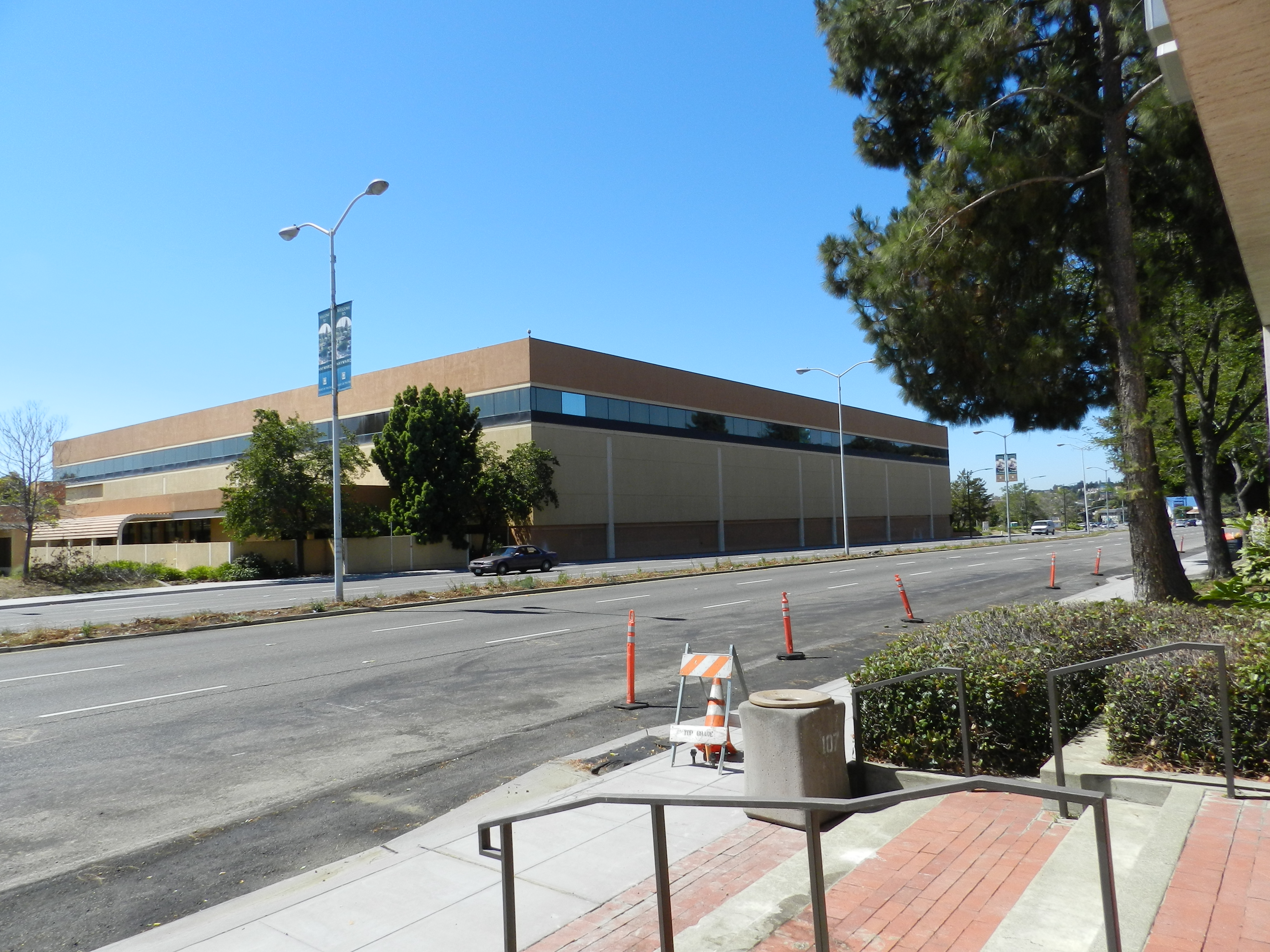
Mervyn's former headquarters, Hayward, not in use (2011); subsequently demolished

Although the company attempted to undergo reorganization under bankruptcy, Mervyn's ultimately succumbed to the Great Recession and announced that it would liquidate its assets through Chapter 7 of Title 11 in the United States Code, stating it "is the best course of action to maximize value for all of the company's creditors, employees and other stakeholders." The bankruptcy called for the company to liquidate and close its remaining stores. The announcement came amidst an offer by fashion retailer Forever 21 to purchase 149 of the remaining Mervyn's stores for an undisclosed amount. The original negotiations failed, and Mervyn's liquidated all 149 stores under the bankruptcy action. Several months later, department store retailer Kohl's and Forever 21 prevailed in a joint bid at bankruptcy auction to take over the leases of 46 Mervyn's stores; Kohl's has assumed 31 stores, while Forever 21 has assumed 15 stores.

In a KPIX-TV interview on February 11, 2009, Mervin Morris's son Jeff revealed that the family had bought the Mervyn's name and intellectual property, including the company's customer list as part of an effort to relaunch the company. Morris did not say when the website would launch or how much it would cost, only that decisions would be up to his sons. In 2009, the Mervyn's website was replaced with a single-page site allowing visitors to sign-up for a mailing list to receive updates about the future of Mervyn's. However, that page is no longer accessible, and the website no longer exists. On August 24, 2021, Mervin G. Morris died at his home at age 101.

=== Online-only store ===
As of 2024, Meryvnsonline has appeared as a website specializing in selling closeout and overstock merchandise from other retailers.

== Legacy ==
A private road into a shopping center parking lot where a former Mervyn's location used to be is still named Mervyn's Drive in Fullerton, as a Mervyn's location was there prior to 2008. Caltrans continues to maintain the traffic signal which connects the private road to Imperial Highway, and installed a new overhead sign with the name "Mervyn's Dr" in 2019 after the old one fell off. The former store is now a Floor & Decor.

A private road into a shopping center parking lot in Bakersfield is still named Mervyn's Place continuing the department store's legacy.

A minor road leading to a former location in San Jose is named Mervyn's Way.

Several times in the TV Series Brooklyn Nine-Nine, main character Charles Boyle and his relatives references the franchise as the source of his clothing.
