= Boynton Beach Mall =

Dead mall in Palm Beach County, Florida, U.S.

- Center Court (May 2005)
- Location: Boynton Beach, Florida, United States
- Coordinates: 26.535555°N 80.095825°W
- Address: 801 N. Congress Avenue, 33426
- Opened: October 9, 1985; 41 years ago
- Closed: January 15, 2027 (expected; all inline tenants ordered to vacate)
- Developer: Edward J. DeBartolo Corporation
- Manager: CBRE Group
- Owner: Washington Prime Group
- Num. of stores: 135+ (at peak)
- Num. of anchor tenants: 6 (formerly 7; 4 open, 2 vacant, 1 demolished)
- Floor area: 869,936 square feet (80,820 m^{2})
- Floors: 1 (2 in Christ Fellowship, JCPenney, former Macy's, Burdines and Sears, closed second floor in Dillard's Clearance Center)
- Parking: Parking lot
- Website: boyntonbeachmall.com

The Boynton Beach Mall is a regional mall in Boynton Beach, Florida, owned by Washington Prime Group (WPG) and operated by CBRE. As of March 2025, its anchors include Dillard's Clearance Center, JCPenney, Christ Fellowship, and Cinemark. The mall has space for about 135 specialty stores and eateries, but the majority of them are vacant.

The mall was developed by the Edward J. DeBartolo Corporation and opened in October 1985, part of Palm Beach County and the Miami metropolitan area. It was included in the corporate spin-off by Simon Property Group to WPG in 2014, as the mall started to decline. The mall's anchors that have closed or were rebranded were Macy's, Burdines, Muvico Theaters, Lord & Taylor, Jordan Marsh, Mervyn's, and Dillard's (as a traditional department store). As of July 2026, redevelopment is being considered, though a formal plan has not been established yet. However, as of October 2026, the mall's remaining stores were ordered to leave by January 2027, and WPG plans to sell the mall.

== History ==
=== 1971–1989: Development, opening, and early years ===
In 1971, Edward J. DeBartolo Sr., who was a shopping mall developer based in Youngstown, Ohio, was flying over Palm Beach County in his private jet, looking to build shopping centers throughout Florida. He requested his pilot to land in Boynton Beach, as he found a vacant 150-acre (61 ha) site west of Congress Avenue, 20 miles south of his Palm Beach Mall, and about a half-mile north of Boynton Beach Boulevard. The farmland used to be populated by multiple grazing cows, but by the time DeBartolo explored the site, he did not find such, predicting that the area could be suitable for commercial and residential development.

DeBartolo proposed a 1-million-square-foot (93,000 m^{2}) regional mall on the site, which was predicted by Vice Mayor Joe DeLong that if annexed, the city could earn $575,000 in property taxes. DeBartolo also negotiated with the Winchester family to purchase the land, expecting the mall's construction to be completed by 1976, and open in August 1977. However, regional department store shifts and financing constraints delayed project momentum to 1980. That was once again stalled when DeBartolo added Macy's to his Aventura Mall in northern Miami-Dade County, which affected the expansion of competitors in South Florida.

In 1982, DeBartolo announced that the anchors for the Boynton Beach Mall would be Burdines, JCPenney, Macy's, Lord & Taylor, and Jordan Marsh, with the site finally being annexed by the city, and the investment of $1.7 million with further support from state funding. Construction on the mall began by the Edward J. DeBartolo Corporation in January 1983, with a projected opening of 1984. However, due to more minor delays, the Boynton Beach Mall did not have its soft opening until October 1, 1985, where hundreds of people lined up hours before the 10:00 a.m. EDT opening time. Store managers greeted excited crowds at the doors, while construction workers could still be seen through glass partitions putting finishing touches to the main concourse. The mall had its grand opening celebration on October 9 of that year, with Miss Florida and Miss Palm Beach County cutting the pink ribbon. Over 35,000 people crowded the mall during that day, with another 70,000 expected for the weekend. The mall was the 18th in Florida built by Edward DeBartolo, and visitors explored the main 1.2-million-square-foot (110,000 m^{2}) mall rather than the 80 tenants open at the time.

At the time of opening, JCPenney, Lord & Taylor, and Burdines were the mall's first anchors. This was followed by the addition of Jordan Marsh in 1986, and Macy's in 1989. The mall's artwork was designed by the Fort Lauderdale-based Deirdre DeWitt.

=== 1991–2010: Anchor changes ===
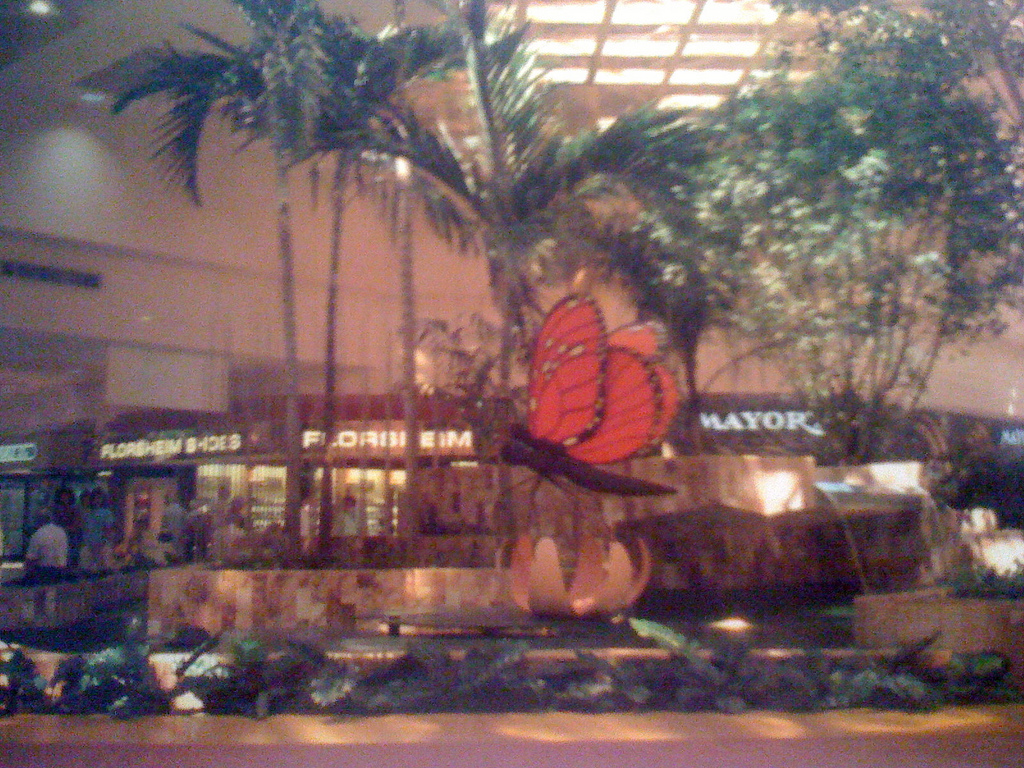
Monarch butterfly at the fountain in the center court of the mall shortly after it opened, c. 1986, which has since been removed.

Mervyn's replaced Lord & Taylor in July 1991. Jordan Marsh closed in late 1991, and it was announced that it would be replaced by Sears in January 1992. Sears opened on July 10 of that year.

By June 15, 1995, the Boynton Beach Mall started to gain a reputation for being unsafe following several armed robberies, carjackings, and vehicle thefts, a notable example being a daytime armed robbery of a young Macy's employee right outside the mall entrance. Simon Property Group merged with the newly public DeBartolo Realty Corporation for $3 billion on March 27, 1996, forming Simon DeBartolo Group. By October 7 of that year, the original 10-year commercial leases were expiring, causing an abrupt spike in vacancies that forced Simon to re-lease several former inline tenant spaces. In a unique partnership to utilize the mall space, "City Hall in the Mall" opened as part of the city's Vision 20/20 initiative. Several inline tenants were expanding, while Victoria's Secret relocated to a larger space. B. Dalton closed, and Zales was under construction, while The Dollar Store would replace Everything's A Dollar. Blockbuster Music was adding 162,502 sq ft (15,096.9 m^{2}) to their store, while Today's Woman became Foot Locker.

In 1997, Dillard's opened in the former Mervyn's space. In September 2004, Federated Department Stores announced that Burdines would be merged and rebranded under the Macy's banner. As a result, Macy's relocated into the mall's Burdines building, and the original Macy's building permanently shut down and was demolished in 2005. A lifestyle center expansion was built on the original Macy's site. It was announced that Muvico Theaters would open on the original Macy's site. However, as explained on June 18, 2006 in the Sun Sentinel, the opening was delayed to two years due to a three-way dispute between Simon Property Group and Muvico Theatres, Florida Power & Light (FPL) over who was responsible for relocating power lines. Furthermore, Hurricane Frances and Jeanne in 2004, followed by Hurricane Wilma in 2005, disrupted construction timelines across the region. The price for construction on the movie theater was also increasing.

The 70,000 sq ft (6,500 m^{2}) Muvico Boynton Beach 14 would debut on May 4, 2007, in time for the release of Spider-Man 3. Around October 29, 2008, new businesses New York & Co., Glamour Shots, Gorilla Games, and Mr. Pretzel opened at the mall, while tenants like GameStop, Chick-fil-A, and Ruby Tuesday completed interior updates or relocations. In March 2009, Muvico sold the theater, alongside three others to Cinemark Theatres, which rebranded the Boynton Beach Mall location as Cinemark Boynton Beach 14 and XD. In July 2010, a new 16-passenger electric trackless train from Beston opened, alongside the Riverside Restaurant (themed after the Caribbean), and NY Men's II, Suzi's Jewelry, Rockafit, Bijoux Pierre, expansions of Fits R Us and Kiss My Glass, alongside other local and family-owned tenants.

=== 2011–present: Decline and closure ===
Recognizing a decline in traditional indoor mall traffic, Simon put the Boynton Beach Mall up for sale on April 6, 2011, which was unsuccessful. In July of that year, Dillard's converted the men's store (the former Lord & Taylor/Mervyn's building) into a clearance center. This left the former women's store behind to be purchased by Christ Fellowship in December 2012, which opened on April 18, 2014. On July 8 of that year, Simon Property Group spun-off 98 underperforming properties to Washington Prime Group (WPG), including the Boynton Beach Mall. H&M would open a 15,000 sq ft (1,400 m^{2}) store at the mall in the summer of 2015.

Macy's launched Macy's Backstage at the mall in May 2017 to compete against TJ Maxx and Ross Dress For Less. That year, the Disney Store closed permanently. In June 2017, TooJay's Deli relocated from the mall to the Oakwood Shopping Center, as its lease was expiring. On November 8, 2018, Sears announced that its 142,000 sq ft (13,200 m^{2}) store at the mall would be closing as part of a plan to shut down 40 locations nationwide. On March 23, 2020, WPG temporarily closed the mall due to the COVID-19 pandemic Prior to that, the mall was battling a 30%+ vacancy rate. The empty spaces were briefly used to serve as COVID-19 testing locations and distribution sites for emergency medical supplies.

==== Redevelopment ====
The City of Boynton Beach rezoned the 91-acre (37 ha) property from commercial retail to suburban mixed-use in 2020 to prevent the site from permanently sitting as a "wasteland of concrete." On August 9, 2023, WPG hired the Chicago, Illinois-based JLL to put the property up for sale, branding the listing as "Boynton Beach 91".

In January 2025, Macy's announced that its store at Boynton Beach Mall would close as part of a plan to close 66 stores nationwide, leaving the mall with JCPenney, Cinemark, Dillard's Clearance Store, and the Christ Fellowship church as its anchors. In 2026, management of the mall was sold to CBRE, while Washington Prime Group remained the owner. On June 1, The Palm Beach Post asked, "Could Boynton Beach Mall be torn down for housing or offices?" As of July 2026, redevelopment plans could potentially include at least 1,700 residential units.

On October 19, 2026, Washington Prime Group sent eviction notices that ordered all remaining tenants (except JCPenney, Cinemark, and Christ Fellowship Church) to vacate by January 15, 2027. The mall will be sold to an undisclosed buyer, and is expected to permanently close its doors on January 15, 2027, for redevelopment.

== See also ==
- The Centre at Salisbury
- Mesa Mall
- Westminster Mall (California)
