= Shops at Merrick Park =

Shopping center in Coral Gables, Florida, U.S.

The Shops at Merrick Park
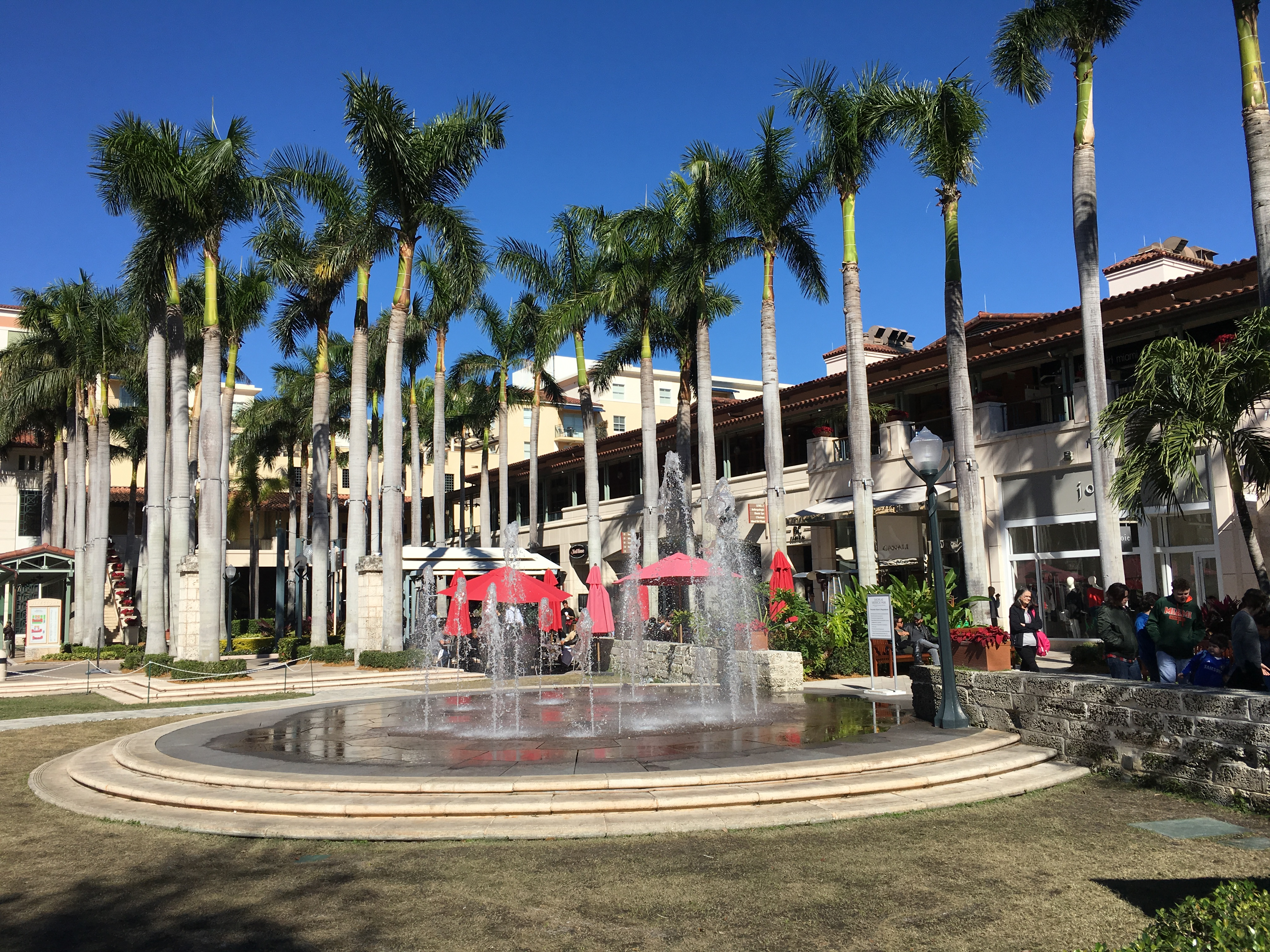
- Exterior view (January 2018)
- Location: Coral Gables, Florida, United States
- Coordinates: 25.731167°N 80.259662°W
- Address: 358 San Lorenzo Avenue
- Opened: September 28, 2002; 24 years ago
- Previous names: The Village of Merrick Park (2002–2012)
- Developer: The Rouse Company
- Manager: GGP
- Owner: GGP
- Architect: ELS Architecture and Urban Design
- Num. of stores: 98
- Num. of anchor tenants: 3
- Floor area: 742,871 sq ft (69,015.0 m^{2}).
- Floors: 3
- Parking: Parking garage / Parking lot
- Website: shopsatmerrickpark.com

The Shops at Merrick Park, the retail component of The Village of Merrick Park and formerly known under the same name, is an outdoor shopping mall in Coral Gables, Florida. Its anchor stores are Neiman Marcus, Nordstrom, and Equinox Fitness. The mall opened in September 2002, and it was the last project completed by The Rouse Company entirely before being acquired by General Growth Properties, and the mall is currently owned and managed by Brookfield Properties through its GGP (the current name for General Growth Properties) subsidiary. The mall is part of The Village of Merrick Park planned community development, akin to The Village of Cross Keys in Baltimore, and was renamed to The Shops at Merrick Park (or Merrick Shops) to avoid confusion from the entire Village of Merrick Park development.

The development also includes The Office at Merrick Park.

== History ==
=== 1983–2002: Development and opening ===
Starting in 1983, Coral Gables, Florida began seeing redevelopment of its equipment yard, which housed a repair shop for city maintenance vehicles. The site was chosen for redevelopment due to low use, with the city having submitted more than 30 plans starting that year. Among these was a 1992 proposal to replace the site with a standalone Home Depot. At the end of 1996, ten proposals were submitted to the city's economic development director, including a movie theater or health club. A brother of Julio Iglesias also proposed turning the site into a 2500-seat banquet hall.

Two shopping mall developers, The Rouse Company and Columbus Realty Trust, both submitted plans for turning the site into a shopping mall, with a committee selected by the city council opting for Rouse's plan. The company proposed to turn the site (on San Lorenzo Avenue near US 1) into a 800,000-square-foot (74,000 m^{2}) outdoor mall with two anchor stores: the second Neiman Marcus in the Miami metropolitan area, and the first Nordstrom in the state of Florida. To alleviate concerns among retailers within Coral Gables's Miracle Mile retail district, Rouse also proposed a shuttle bus route connecting it to the mall. Building costs were estimated at $200,000,000, with a targeted opening year of 2001. By comparison, Columbus Realty's plan called for a series of housing complexes with smaller-scale retail on the ground floor, such as a dry cleaners and a gourmet grocery store.

In March 1997, a group of merchants housed on the Miracle Mile founded the Coalition to Save Coral Gables, an organization intended to stop development of the mall. This group held a public meeting to oppose both Rouse's and Columbus Realty's plans for shopping malls on the site; while Rouse declined the coalition's offer to send representatives to the meeting, Columbus Realty sent two. Despite the opposition, the city unanimously voted in March 1997 to approve Rouse's initial plan for the shopping mall, which by that point the company had given the name Village of Merrick Park. Market analysis by Rouse concluded the site was suitable for the upscale retailers desired by the company, due to the high value of houses in the market. Jerome Smalley, then senior vice president of the Rouse Co., stated in December 1997 that the proposal had been altered to eliminate the proposed hotel, due to concerns it would compete with the Miami Biltmore Hotel in downtown Coral Gables. At a meeting in December 1998, city officials unanimously agreed to file a development order for Rouse to begin mall construction. By the start of 1999, the city began moving its vehicle maintenance facilities away from the mall's site into a new location on 72nd Avenue. Final approval for the project took place between January and February 2000, having been delayed due to local protests and concerns that the new project would complicate traffic in the area. In response to the latter concern, Rouse agreed to donate $625,000 to the city to install traffic calming devices.

Rouse confirmed in March 2000 that groundbreaking would begin one month later, with a targeted opening date of September 2002. Final plans for the project included 120 apartments, 850,000 square feet (79,000 m^{2}) of retail space, 110,000 square feet (10,000 m^{2}) of office space, and over 3,000 parking spaces. In January 2001, Rouse confirmed that in addition to Neiman Marcus and Nordstrom, tenants of the mall would include The Palm, Dean & DeLuca, and local jewelry store Mayors, which would be relocating from the Miracle Mile. In June 2001, Rouse attempted to sue Stanley Whitman, then-owner of Bal Harbour Shops in the Miami suburb of Bal Harbour. At the time, Bal Harbour Shops had the only retail locations for Gucci, Cartier, and Chanel in the Miami area, and their contracts with Bal Harbour required them to pay a percentage of all sales to that mall should any of them open another store. Jerry Smalley, then executive vice president of development for Rouse, considered this contract a restraint of trade. The lawsuit was ruled in Rouse's favor in March 2002. Rouse confirmed further tenants that same month, including Burberry, Façonnable, and Hugo Boss, which had previously closed its store at Bal Harbour Shops due to it being too small. Despite the number of tenants confirmed by this point, Dean & DeLuca withdrew from the project, citing the economic downturn after the September 11 attacks. Rouse cited both the Merrick Park development and their then-current expansion of Fashion Show Mall (now known as Fashion Show Las Vegas) in Las Vegas, Nevada, as examples of the company's move toward upscale retail since the 1990s. The Miami Herald reported on September 22, 2002 that the mall was on target to open on the 27th, despite a number of storefronts having not been finished at the time. Because of these issues, Hugo Boss would be operating from a temporary storefront, and Burberry from one with temporary doors. Rouse reported that the mall would be about 70% leased on opening day, but thought the upcoming Christmas shopping season would be beneficial to boosting tenancy and sales prior to year's end.

The Village of Merrick Park opened on September 28, 2002. In addition to Neiman Marcus and Nordstrom, other tenants present on opening day included Façonnable, Burberry, Williams-Sonoma, Victoria's Secret, Express, Inc., and Jimmy Choo. Over 10,000 shoppers attended opening-day ceremonies, which included a fashion show put on by Chanel. Retail analyst Walter Loeb stated on opening day that he thought the mall would be "one of the top centers in the country." Nordstrom held its own opening ceremonies the same week the rest of the mall opened, including its own fashion show and the company's first ribbon-cutting ceremony in 24 years.

=== After opening ===
In November 2004, the mall's ownership was transferred to General Growth Properties after purchasing the Rouse Co. for $12.6 billion.

GGP renamed the mall from The Village of Merrick Park to The Shops at Merrick Park in August 2012.

In 2016, Landmark Theatres opened a 7-screen movie theater at the mall. A year later, 227 residences opened across from the mall.

In 2018, Harmont and Blaine and Kumon opened locations at the mall.

All of GGP Inc.'s portfolio was transferred to Brookfield Properties in August 2018, including The Shops at Merrick Park.

Brookfield Properties reverted its retail division to the GGP name in January 2026.

== 2003 robbery ==
On January 15, 2003, five robbers shot a security guard while committing a heist at the Mayors Jewelers store. The Miami Herald reported that while the incident did slow tenancy at some stores, other patrons reported no effect. All five suspects were charged with first-degree murder and armed robbery.
