= The Galleria at Fort Lauderdale =

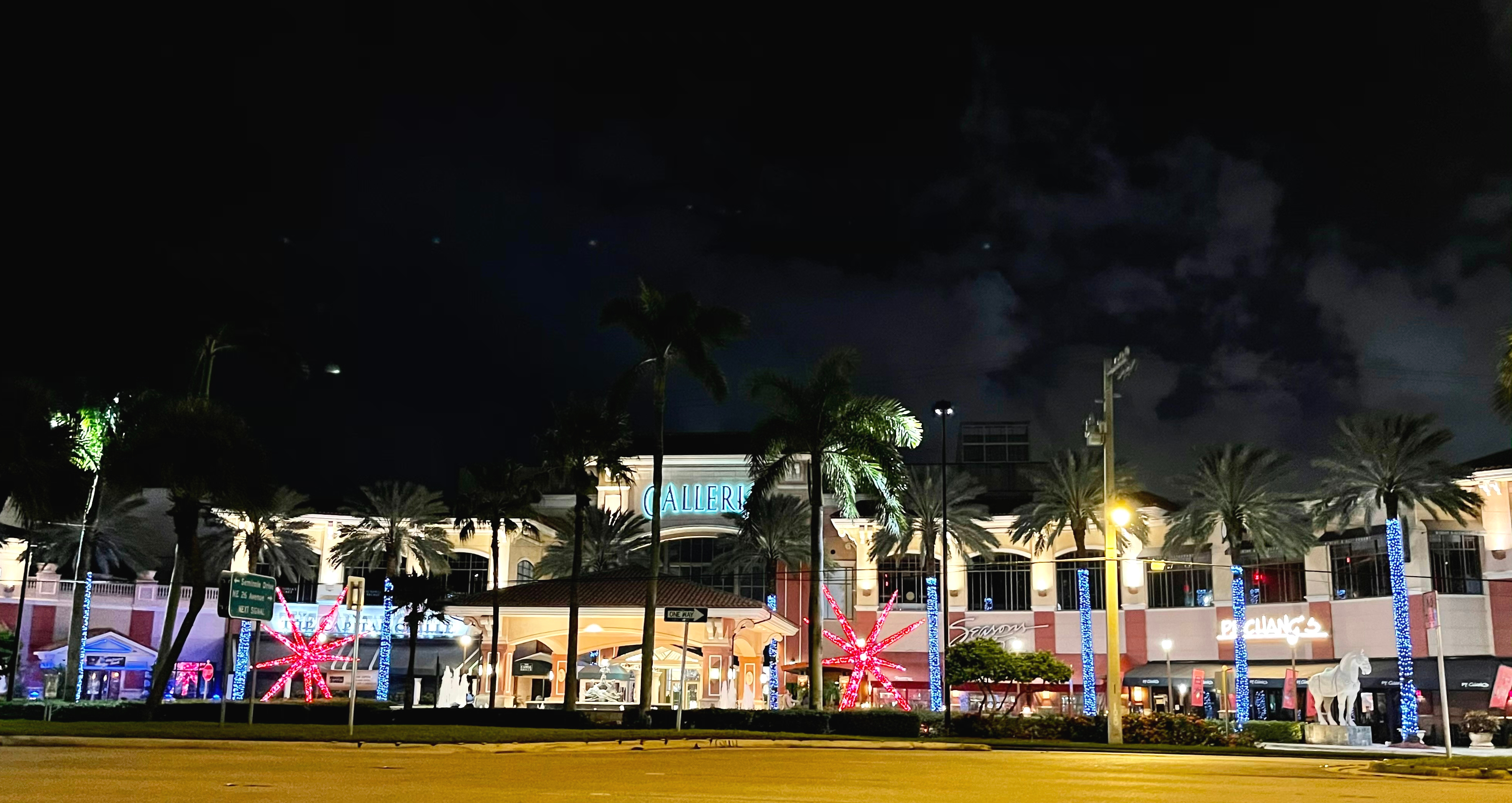
- Location: Fort Lauderdale, Florida, United States
- Coordinates: 26.136667°N 80.113721°W
- Address: 2414 East Sunrise Boulevard
- Opened: November 11, 1980; 45 years ago
- Developer: Leonard L. Farber, Inc.
- Manager: Centennial Real Estate Management
- Owner: GFO Investments, InSite Group and Atlas Hill RE
- Architect: Gamble, Pownall & Gilroy (Sunrise Center)
- Num. of stores: 120+
- Num. of anchor tenants: 3 (formerly 4)
- Floor area: 1,400,000 square feet (130,000 m^{2})
- Floors: 3 (4 in Dillard's)
- Parking: Garages
- Website: galleriamall-fl.com

The Galleria at Fort Lauderdale is an upscale super-regional shopping mall on Sunrise Boulevard in Fort Lauderdale, Florida. It was originally constructed in 1954 as the open-air shopping mall the Sunrise Center.

The mall is owned by GFO Investments, InSite Group and Atlas Hill RE. The latter company is responsible for the property's leasing, while Centennial Real Estate Management is responsible for the property's management. Prior to Centennial, the mall was managed by the Kravco Company, Simon Property Group and Jones Lang LaSalle.

== History ==
The Galleria was originally the Sunrise Center, an open-air shopping mall constructed in 1954, but was demolished except for the Jordan Marsh store (reopened as South Florida's first Dillard's in 1993; Dillard's stores later opened at Pembroke Lakes Mall in 1995 and The Mall at Wellington Green in 2001), and rebuilt as an enclosed mall. The Galleria opened in three phases: initially on November 11, 1980, with Burdines (now Macy's), Saks Fifth Avenue (now H&M and IWG) and Jordan Marsh; second in 1982 featuring Neiman Marcus (which closed in 2020 following an announcement on July 23); and lastly in 1983 with Lord & Taylor (partially now Powerhouse Gym).

The Pennsylvania Public School Employees' Retirement System pension fund bought the mall in 1993 for $125 million.

From 2001 to 2003, $44 million was spent on renovations that included bringing in palm trees, opening windows and adding tri-color floor tiles.

In 2014, redevelopment of the area around The Galleria was proposed, with 1,600 condos and 150 hotel rooms. The redevelopment never materialized due to community opposition.

In 2018, an aquarium was proposed for the space previously occupied by Lord & Taylor. Aquarium operator SeaQuest proposed adding 1,200 marine animals, including sharks and stingrays to the space. The plan never materialized.

On September 24, 2025, a consortium of buyers including GFO Investments, InSite Group and Atlas Hill RE acquired the property. On the same day, it was announced that Centennial Real Estate Management were contracted by the consortium to manage the mall while Atlas Hill RE were slated to handle the property's retail leasing. GFO and InSite are currently planning to redevelop the flat parking lots surrounding the mall into a mixed-use project consisting of nine, 30-story towers and a hotel. The nine towers are reported to contain 3,144 residential rental units, including 1,273 workforce housing units.

== Current anchors ==
- Dillard's; 192,174 square feet (17,853.5 m^{2})
- H&M; 28,000 square feet (2,600 m^{2})
- Macy's; 198,433 square feet (18,435.0 m^{2})

== Former anchors ==
- Burdines (converted to Macy's in 2005)
- Jordan Marsh (closed in 1991 and became Dillard's in 1993)
- Lord & Taylor (closed in February 2002 and is now partially split into a 22,000 square foot Powerhouse Gym and a 63,000 square foot vacant space.)
- Neiman Marcus (closed in September 2020)
- Saks Fifth Avenue (closed in July 2009, became a Publix Health and Fitness Expo in 2011, then mostly split into a 28,000 square foot H&M and a 22,781 square foot IWG in 2016 with a 22,000 square foot vacant space)
