= River Valley Mall =

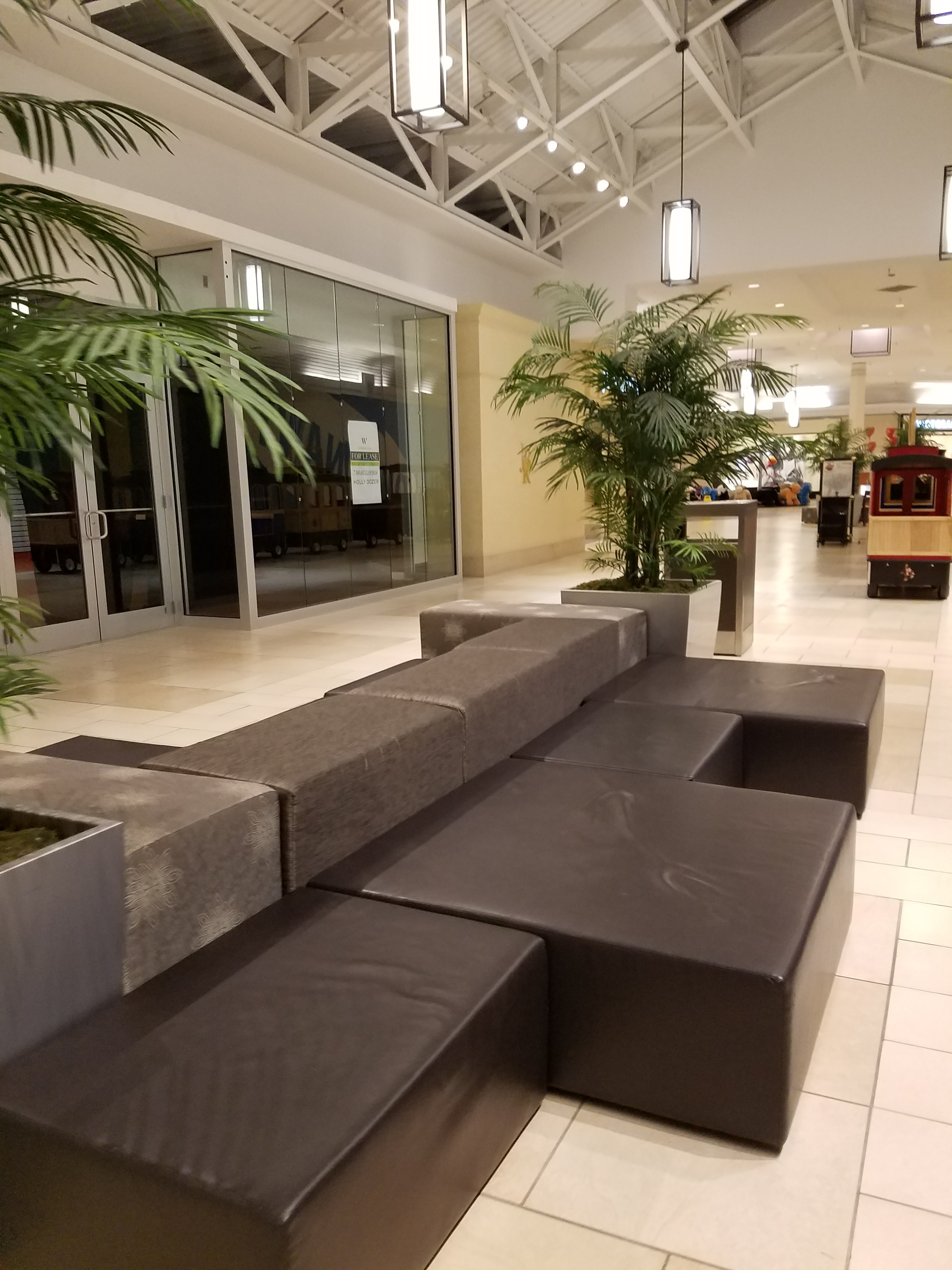
- A corridor of River Valley Mall in 2017.
- Location: Lancaster, Ohio, U.S.
- Coordinates: 39°43′55.7″N 82°37′41.1″W
- Address: 1635 River Valley Circle South
- Opened: 1987
- Developer: Glimcher Realty Trust
- Manager: Mason Asset Management
- Owner: Namdar Realty Group
- Num. of stores: 55+
- Num. of anchor tenants: 4 (3 open, 1 vacant)
- Floor area: 521,587 square feet (48,457.0 m^{2})
- Floors: 1

River Valley Mall is an enclosed shopping mall serving Lancaster, Ohio, United States. It was built in 1987 by Glimcher Realty Trust. The mall's anchor stores are Dick's Sporting Goods, JCPenney, and Rural King. There is also one vacant anchor store that was once Sears. The mall is owned by Namdar Realty Group.

== History ==
In 1985, Fairfield County, Ohio commissioners approved a contract submitted by Glimcher Realty Trust to develop River Valley Mall along Memorial Drive, then part of US 33, west of the city of Lancaster, Ohio. Initial building costs were estimated at $4,000,000, not counting improvements to the infrastructure around the property. Construction began in June 1986, by which point Glimcher had confirmed that the mall would consist of nearly 500,000 square feet (46,000 m^{2}) of retail space, including approximately 80 shops and restaurants and a movie theater. Two anchor stores had also committed to the project at this point: Lazarus, and J. C. Penney, which would relocate from its existing store in the Plaza Shopping Center. By August 1986, Hills had been confirmed as the mall's third anchor, and Elder-Beerman as the fourth in March 1987. Mall developers noted that the mall's tenant mix reflected the retail needs of a market the size of Lancaster, and that the decision to add a fourth department store was due to the initial success of the company's Indian Mound Mall in Heath, Ohio. Upon opening for business on October 1, 1987, the mall had more than 50 spaces leased. Over 25 stores joined the mall by 1989, including a 100,000-square-foot (9,300 m^{2}) expansion consisting of the movie theater and a fifth anchor store, Sears, which opened that October. Sears had also relocated from the Plaza Shopping Center. On July 23, 1995, a Target store opened near the mall.

Ames acquired the Hills chain in 1999, but closed the store in 2001 as part of its departure from Ohio. Lazarus was converted to Macy's in 2005, but closed in 2007 due to declining sales. Steve & Barry's, which took the former Ames in 2003, closed in 2009 when the chain went out of business, although the mall also added IHOP and Old Navy at this point. A 2009 Columbus Dispatch article noted that the additions of these new stores countered concerns about decreasing mall traffic after the US 33 by pass of Lancaster was built in 2005. Dick's Sporting Goods took the former Lazarus/Macy's anchor in 2010.

In 2014, Regal Cinemas closed the mall's movie theater, following announcements that Cinemark would demolish the former Steve & Barry's building for a new theater. At the same time, Glimcher put up both River Valley and Indian Mound malls for sale. Glimcher forfeited ownership of the mall to Woodmont Company in 2016 to avoid foreclosure, and Woodmont in turn sold it to RVM LLC in 2017. Sears closed in April 2017 as part of a plan to close 150 stores nationwide. Elder-Beerman closed on August 29, 2018 when its parent company The Bon-Ton went out of business. As of 2021, River Valley Mall had an occupancy rate of 50 percent.

The Lancaster Eagle-Gazette reported on September 3, 2025, that Rural King was planning to move into the former Elder-Beerman space in 2026 after receiving a permit from the city on an exemption on having an outdoor sales space. Rural King held a soft opening on July 9, 2026, and grand opening festivities were held on July 17, 2026.

The former Sears space has been used for Toys for Tots drives and Spirit Halloween pop-up stores since its vacancy.
