= New Towne Mall =

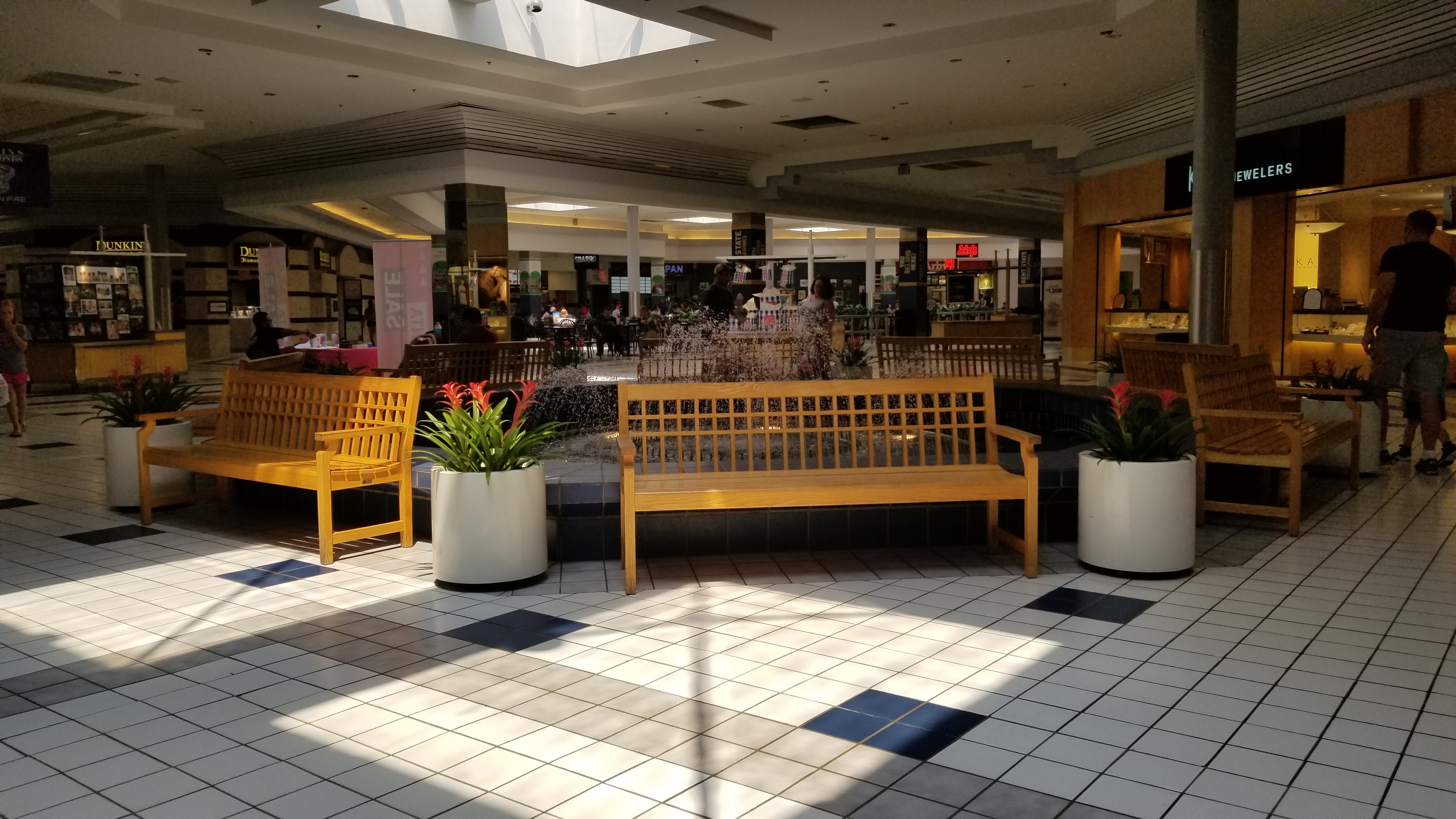
- Interior of New Towne Mall in 2018
- Location: New Philadelphia, Ohio, United States
- Coordinates: 40°28′50″N 81°26′28″W
- Address: 400 Mill Avenue Southeast
- Opened: October 20, 1988; 38 years ago
- Developer: Glimcher Realty Trust
- Owner: Kohan Retail Investment Group
- Architect: Keeva Kekst Associates
- Num. of stores: 50+
- Num. of anchor tenants: 6
- Floor area: 505,029 square feet (46,918.7 m^{2})
- Floors: 1

New Towne Mall is a shopping mall in New Philadelphia, Ohio, United States. It was built in 1988 by Glimcher Realty Trust. The mall's anchor stores are Marshalls, Kohl's, and Dick's Sporting Goods, with two vacant anchor stores previously occupied by JCPenney and Elder-Beerman. It is owned and managed by Kohan Retail Investment Group.

== History ==
Glimcher Realty Trust first announced plans for New Towne Mall in 1987. Their plans called for a mall to feature Phar-Mor, Hills, JCPenney, Sears, and Elder-Beerman as the anchor stores, along with 80 stores, a food court, and a movie theater. JCPenney relocated to the mall from an existing store at Miracle Lane Plaza in nearby Dover, Ohio. The development coincided with another one of Glimcher Realty Trust's developments in the state of Ohio, Indian Mound Mall in Heath. Both malls featured similar floor plans and architecture by Keeva Kekst Associates of Cleveland, Ohio.

Ames purchased Hills in 1999 and went out of business in 2002. Three years later, their space at the mall became Kohl's. Elder-Beerman expanded its store in 2005. Phar-Mor, which also went out of business in 2002, was replaced by Goody's in 2004. This store closed in January 2007. It was replaced by Steve & Barry's in 2007, but the store closed in 2008 when that chain filed for bankruptcy.

In 2013, the mall held 25th-anniversary sales and a cake cutting ceremony. Coinciding with this, Marshalls opened a store at New Towne Mall. Also joining the mall in 2013 were Jo-Ann Fabrics (in the former Steve & Barry's space) and rue21.

Sears closed in 2016 and underwent conversion to a Dick's Sporting Goods the same year. JCPenney and Elder-Beerman closed in 2017 and 2018 respectively, making them the last two original anchor stores to leave. The closure of Elder-Beerman was due to its parent company The Bon-Ton filing for bankruptcy. On March 30, 2024, Kohan Retail Investment Group bought the mall for $10 million. That same year, Ashley Furniture replaced the former JCPenney.
