= Merritt Square Mall =

Shopping mall in Florida

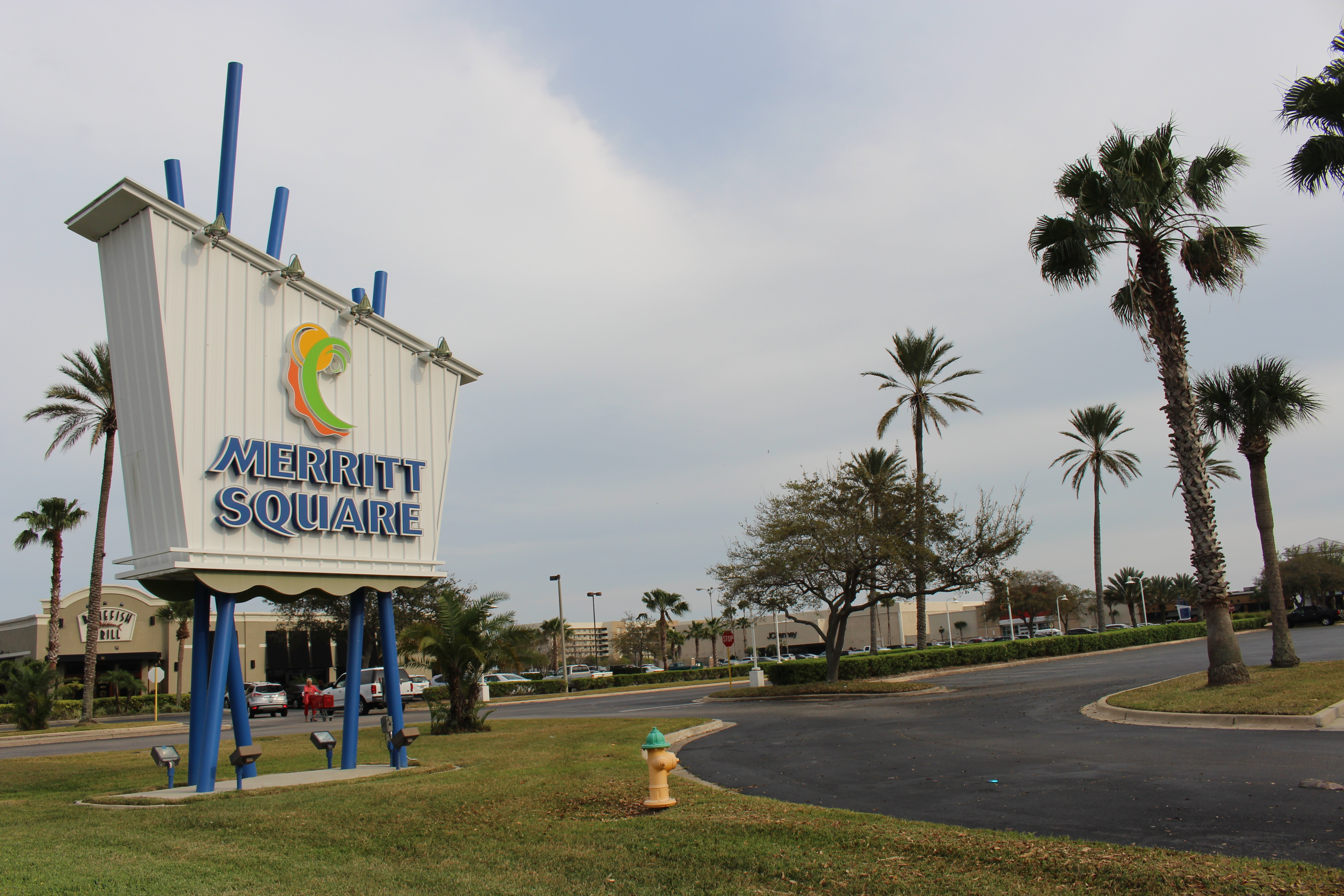
- Entrance to Merritt Square Mall, 2016
- Location: Merritt Island, Florida, U.S.
- Coordinates: 28.35451°N 80.68709°W
- Opened: July 9, 1970
- Developer: Alpert Investment
- Owner: Namdar Realty Group
- Num. of stores: 125
- Num. of anchor tenants: 5 (4 open, 1 vacant)
- Floor area: 810,814 square feet (75,327.1 m^{2})
- Floors: 1 (2 in Macy's, Employee 2nd floor in JCPenney)
- Public transit: SCAT bus: 3, 4

Merritt Square Mall is a shopping mall in Merritt Island, Florida. Opened in 1970, the mall features four anchor stores: J. C. Penney, Dillard's, Macy's, and Ollie's Bargain Outlet with one vacant anchor last occupied by Sears.

== History ==
The mall opened in 1970 and is the oldest mall in Brevard County, Florida. Its original anchor stores were Jordan Marsh (later Burdines, now Macy's), Ivey's (now Dillard's), and J. C. Penney. It remained unchanged until 1985, when a renovation plan was announced which would add 60,000 square feet (5,600 m^{2}) of retail space. Also part of this expansion was a fourth department store, Sears, which opened in 1989 and replaced an existing store in Rockledge.

The mall was sold to Bayview Malls LLC for $32.7 million in 2002 by previous owner John Hancock Life Insurance Co, before being sold again in 2005 to Thor Merritt Square LLC for $64.4 million. Glimcher Realty Trust took control of the mall in 2007, ownership later shifting to WP Glimcher with its formation by merger in 2015. In 2016, the mall was foreclosed on and auctioned on while under the ownership of WP Glimcher. The mall had no bidders. The mall is currently owned by Namdar Realty Group.

Sports Authority joined the mall in 2013, but closed in 2016 when the chain filed for bankruptcy. An Ollie's Bargain Outlet opened in the space in 2018.

On February 15, 2021, it was announced that Sears would be closing as part of a plan to close 34 stores nationwide. The store closed on May 2, 2021.
