= Ashland Town Center =

- Location: Ashland, Kentucky, United States
- Coordinates: 38°29′1″N 82°39′12″W
- Opened: 1989
- Developer: Glimcher Realty Trust; Edward J. DeBartolo Corp. Crown American
- Owner: CBL Properties
- Num. of stores: 73
- Num. of anchor tenants: 4
- Floor area: 420,820 square feet (39,095.5 m^{2}) (GLA)
- Floors: 1
- Public transit: ABS
- Website: ashlandtowncenter.com

Ashland Town Center is an enclosed shopping mall located in the city of Ashland, Kentucky, United States. One of two malls serving the city, it is located on U.S. Highway 23 near downtown Ashland. The mall features more than seventy retailers and restaurants, as well as a food court. The mall's anchor stores are JCPenney, TJ Maxx, and two Belk stores. Junior anchors are Ulta Beauty, Kay Jewelers, Aspen Dental, and Five Below. The mall is managed by CBL Properties.

== History ==
Ashland Town Center was developed in 1988 as a joint venture of Glimcher Realty Trust (the mall's original owner), along with Edward J. Debartolo Corporation (now part of Simon Property Group) and Crown American. The mall opened in 1989 with Walmart, JCPenney, and Hess's as its original anchor stores; Goody's was later added as a fourth anchor. Throughout the 1990s, Ashland Town Center went largely unchanged. In 1993, the Hess's chain sold several of its locations to Alcoa, Tennessee-based Proffitt's, which in turn sold its stores to Belk in 2006.

=== Mid-2000s renovations ===
In 2005, the Walmart anchor was vacated when Walmart relocated to a new Supercenter outside the mall itself. The former Walmart space was then demolished in early 2008 for a newer JCPenney store. Construction on this new store, one of three JCPenney prototype stores in the U.S., began soon afterward. Opened in August 2008, the store is twice the size of the former location. The existing JCPenney store was vacated, with half of it becoming a Belk Men and Home Store in 2009. This store replaced a Belk Men's Store in the Belk wing, which became a relocated Hibbett Sports in late 2009 and is now a Five Below as of 2020.

In addition to the relocation of JCPenney, Ashland Town Center went through further renovations in 2008 and 2009. The food court was downsized to make room for new retail space, a family restroom was created and the Men's and Women's restrooms were both remodeled. Additional mall tenants were also relocated to create more space in the JCPenney corridor. A Cheddar's Casual Café was also constructed in the parking lot near JCPenney, followed by a Slim Chickens in 2018.

In 2010, TJ Maxx replaced Goody's as an anchor store and Rax, Panera Bread and The Children's Place also opened new stores in the mall.

In 2022, EarthWise Pet, a local pet nutrition and wellness spa, opened near the food court and TJ Maxx. National restaurant chain Olive Garden opened in May 2023, in the former space for local restaurant Kentucky Hall of Fame Cafe.

On July 30, 2025, CBL Properties of Chattanooga, Tennessee announced they had completed the purchase of four malls from Washington Prime Group, including Ashland Town Center as well as malls in Colorado, Florida, and Montana.
