= Elizabeth Center =

Retail center in New Jersey

Coordinates: 40.6685°N 74.1712°W

The Elizabeth Center is a power center located off exit 13A on the New Jersey Turnpike in Elizabeth, New Jersey. The location near the exit is incorporated into the center's logo, as El13Abeth Center. The first tenant, IKEA, opened in 1990. It is right next to the Jersey Gardens mall and also located in an Urban Enterprise Zone. Newark Liberty International Airport is located to the left of Elizabeth Center. There is a parking lot right next to the IKEA store for plane spotters to view aircraft.

== History ==
Built on a former landfill, in 1990 the Swedish-based home furnishings store, IKEA, opened. It became very successful, and by the mid-1990s, an Incredible Universe store opened next to IKEA. Toys "R" Us Kid's World, a prototype store also opened which included 100,000 sq ft (9,300 m^{2}). of space, including Toys "R" Us, Kids "R" Us, Babies "R" Us, the Warner Bros. store, Kids Foot Locker, a photo studio, children's hair salon, play area, candy store and Pizza Hut.

The IKEA store was renovated and expanded in 1998. The Incredible Universe store was closed in 1996 after the chain went under. In 1997, Here Comes The Place, "RexPlex", a large indoor theme park, skate park, and arena park. It also featured a soccer field in the parking lot. It closed in 2004 and the soccer field has since been paved over. In 2011, Big Lots was opened next to Toys "R" Us and Babies "R" Us. All Toys "R" Us and Babies "R" Us stores closed in 2018, and Big Lots closed in 2019. A Raymour & Flanigan was also opened in the former RexPlace in 2019 along with Floor & Decor later in the same year.

== Tenants ==
=== Current ===
- IKEA (opened 1990 – remodeled 1998)
- Raymour & Flanigan (opened 2019)
- Floor & Decor (opened 2019)

=== Former ===
- Kids Foot Locker (opened 1996 – closed 1999)
- Pizza Hut (opened 1999 – closed 2000)
- Warner Bros. Studio Store (opened 2000 – closed 2001)
- Toys "R" Us (opened 1996 – closed 2018)
  - Toys "R" Us KidsWorld (opened 1996 – rebranded as Toys "R" Us in 2007)
- Babies "R" Us (opened 2007 – closed 2018)
- Incredible Universe (opened 1995 – closed 1996)
- RexPlex (opened 1997 – closed 2004)
- Big Lots (opened 2011 – closed 2019)
- Unknown Photo Studio (opened 1992 - closed 1996)
- Unknown Hair Salon (opened 1991 - closed 1996)
