= Supermall =

Supermall may refer to:

- SM Supermalls, the largest chain of shopping malls in the Philippines
- The Outlet Collection Seattle, formerly known as SuperMall of the Great Northwest or Supermall
