= Licking County Regional Airport =

Newark–Heath Airport
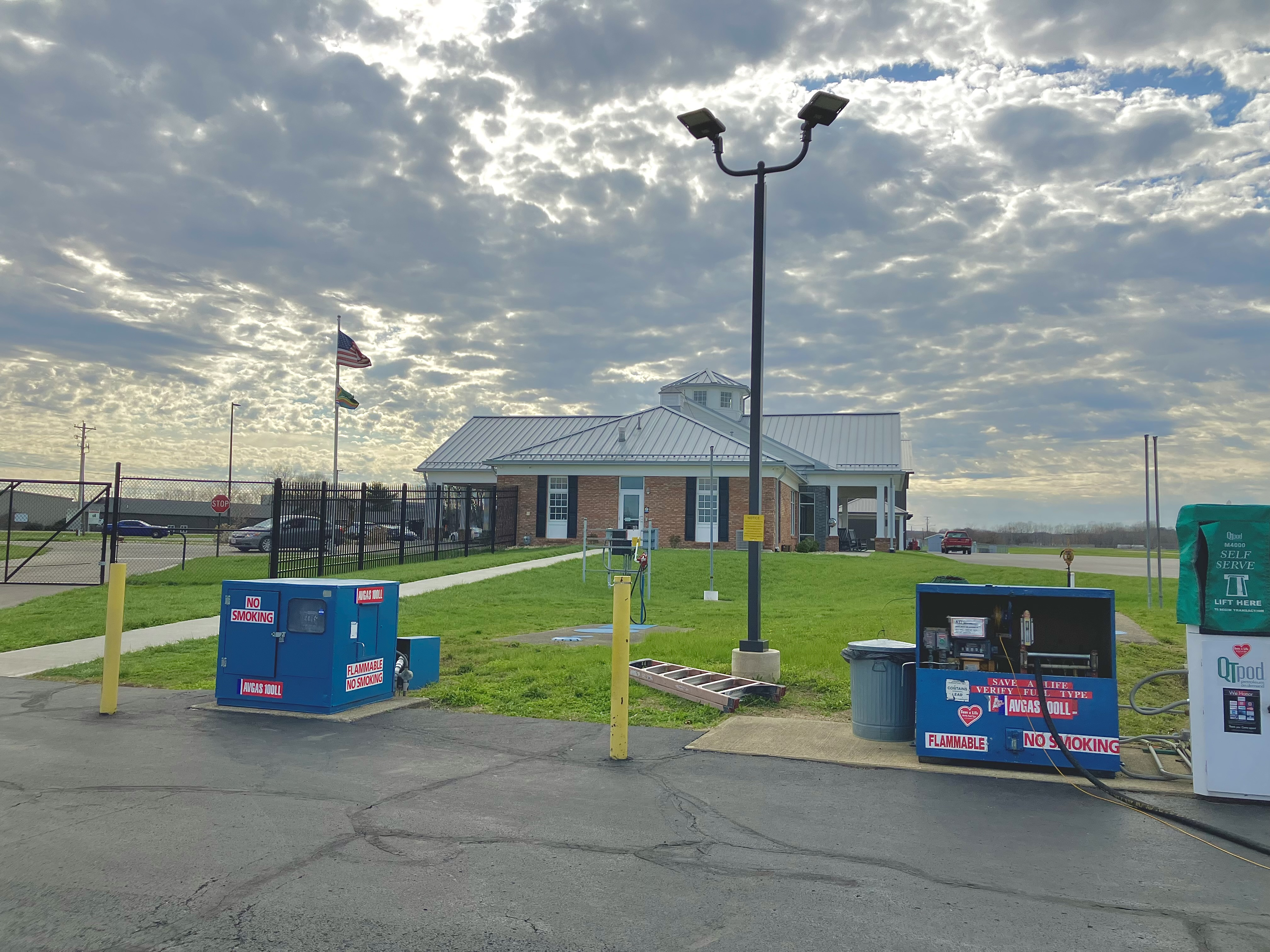
- IATA: none; ICAO: KVTA; FAA LID: VTA

Summary
- Airport type: Public
- Owner: Licking County Regional Airport Authority
- Serves: Newark, Ohio
- Location: Heath, Ohio
- Time zone: UTC−05:00 (-5)
  - Summer (DST): UTC−04:00 (-4)
- Elevation AMSL: 884 ft (269 m)
- Coordinates: 40°01′29″N 082°27′43″W
- Website: www.lickingcounty.gov/depts/regional_airport/default.htm

Maps
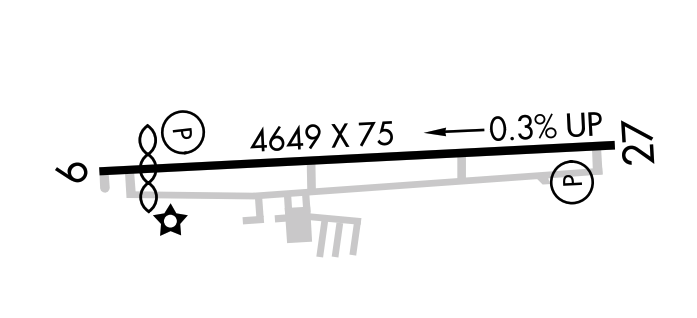

- Location of airport in Ohio VTA (the United States)

Runways
Direction	Length		Surface
Direction	ft	m	Surface
9/27	4,649	1,417	Asphalt

Statistics (2022)
- Aircraft operations (year ending 12/21/2022): 9,210
- Source: Federal Aviation Administration

Licking County Regional Airport, also known as Treneff Field (ICAO: KVTA, FAA LID: VTA) (Note: The airport formerly used the FAA location identifier 2I8.) is a public airport located in Heath, Ohio. It is three miles (4.8 km) southwest of the central business district of Newark, a city in Licking County, Ohio, United States.

Although most U.S. airports use the same three-letter location identifier for the FAA and IATA, Newark–Heath Airport is assigned VTA by the FAA but has no designation from the IATA.

== History ==
The airport was started in the 1930s when the City of Newark purchased the Van Voorhis farm as an emergency landing field for the Transcontinental Airway System. It was in use by late September 1931, when a Lockheed low-wing monoplane made a precautionary landing at the field due to bad weather.

The airport was named Newark City Airport in October 1941 and renamed Walters Field in May 1942. (Note: It was named for Earl Walters, a local aviator.) A six unit hangar was under construction in September 1946. By that time, returning veterans were using their G.I. Bill benefits to learn to fly at the airport. By early January 1947, there were 67 students at the airport, of which 40 were former servicemen. However, by early August 1950, the airport manager was bought out of his contract. On the last day before the airport was to close due to a lack of interest, a manager was found.

By early December 1955, an 648-square-foot (60.2 m^{2}) administration building was under construction at the airport. A 2,600-foot (790 m) paved runway was dedicated in early May 1963. Work on an extension to 3,500 feet (1,100 m) was underway in mid September 1964.

It was suggested that the facility be renamed the Licking County Airport in late August 1966. The nearby Heath Refinery announced it would donate 24 acres (9.7 ha) to the airport in late October. Preliminary design of the airport was approved by the state director of aviation in late December and by the middle of the following month, the airport authority voted to request the city convey the airport to the county. A donation of 4 acres (1.6 ha) in early May 1967 provided the last land required to build the airport. A $100,000 state grant was approved in early June and construction on the project began in late July. Plans called for a new 4,400 ft (1,300 m) runway to be built adjacent to the existing runway, which would become a taxiway. An earthen mound was also constructed at the east end of the runway to serve as a sound barrier. However, in the meantime, significant public opposition had developed and in early August a temporary restraining order was placed on construction. The order was lifted two days later, but, on the night of August 6th, construction equipment being used for the project was vandalized. The City of Heath attempted to obtain an injunction to stop the expansion of the airport in September, but the effort was rejected by a judge. In mid April 1968, the airport authority requested the ability to acquire 51 acres (21 ha) acres that it was leasing from the City of Newark to build the new runway. Although the first jet landed at the airport in mid May, the new runway was not dedicated until 22 September 1968.

Construction on a 4,800-square-foot (450 m^{2}) hangar had begun by late January 1970. By mid September, paving of taxiways and a 86,000-square-foot (8,000 m^{2}) ramp was almost complete. A new terminal was opened by late January 1974.

O-C Aviation, a division of Owens-Corning Fibreglas, began managing the airport in mid August 1979. Four months after the announcement of a future use study in late March 1980, a decision was made to repave the runway. The study, which was presented in July 1982, advised the airport to acquire 61 acres (25 ha) of nearby land. In the meantime, a new hangar had been opened and the airport beacon relocated from a hangar to a stand-alone tower. By early January 1983, the airport was being used by Dow Chemical, Kaiser Aluminum and Owens-Corning Fibreglas. At the same time, the possibility of enlarging the airport resulted in a reconciliation between Heath and the airport authority on zoning matters. In 1984, H&L Aero, a flight school, relocated from Buckeye Executive Airport to Newark–Heath.

By late July 1988, the facility had been renamed Newark–Heath Airport. By late September, it was being proposed to move a 3.5-million imp gal (16,000,000 L) gas tank to a new location farther from the airport to improve safety. Fears that they would be forced to sell their homes lead to some residents at the eastern end of the airport opposing expansion plans. The issue generated sufficient interest that an early November session of the airport authority filled the meeting room to capacity.

Newark Air Force Base, which had been located at the airport since at least 1962, closed on 17 September 1996.

The subtitle Treneff Field was added to the airport's name in tribute to former airport authority president Terry Treneff in April 2018. At the same time, the terminal was named for former board member John Haines. In 2019, the airport's taxiway was moved because the Federal Aviation Administration declared it was too close to the runway. In 2022, the airport received a $1.8 million grant to build a new terminal. The grant program provides funding from the Bipartisan Infrastructure Act for terminal, on-airport rail access, and airport-owned airport traffic control tower projects. A new terminal was built at the airport in 2024, as the taxiway repositioning brought it too close to the building. By October, its name had been changed from Newark–Heath Airport to Licking County Regional Airport.

== Facilities and aircraft ==
=== Facilities ===
Newark–Heath Airport covers an area of 140 acres (57 ha) which contains one asphalt paved runway (9/27) measuring 4,649 ft × 75 ft (1,417 m × 23 m).

Newark–Heath Airport's fixed-base operator, Aviation Works Inc, is owned by George H. Fackler III. Aviation Works offers hangar rental, aircraft rental, and flight training. Aviation Works also offers full service and self-serve refueling with Jet-A and 100LL fuel. Their operating hours are normally 0800-1800 EST.

Innovative Aviation Technologies provides service as a maintenance shop on the field, specializing in Cessna Conquests.

Newark–Heath Airport is home to Chapter 402 of the Experimental Aircraft Association.

A McDonnell F-4C Phantom II, 64-0683, is on static display at the airport.

=== Aircraft ===
For the 12-month period ending December 21, 2022, the airport had 9,210 aircraft operations, an average of 25 per day: 98% general aviation, 1% military and <1% air taxi. For the same time period, 70 aircraft were based at the airport: 63 single-engine and six multi-engine airplanes, as well as one jet.

== Accidents and incidents ==
- On 30 March 1948, an Aeronca and a Taylorcraft collided while landing at the airport, killing the pilot in the former aircraft.
- On 26 July 1959, a single-engine Beechcraft crashed while landing at the airport, killing the two occupants.
- On 30 September 1959, a Cessna 182 collided with a parked Cessna 140 while landing at the airport, seriously damaging both airplanes.
- On March 1, 2001, a Cessna 210 Centurion was substantially damaged during landing at the Newark-Heath Airport. The pilot reported turbulence on his initial approach into Newark and that he subsequently could not get the airplane to climb. The airplane descended faster than normal during the rest of the approach, and the pilot needed significant power to level the plane off before contacting trees on the final approach. During the roundout for landing, the pilot could not get the yoke to come far enough back to land, so the aircraft hit the runway hard on the nose wheel. The aircraft porpoised and bounced into the air multiple times; the engine did not respond to power adjustments the pilot made in an attempt to soften subsequent blows. The aircraft eventually came to rest on grass off the side of the runway. A flight control continuity check performed by an FAA inspector revealed that the control column could only be deflected aft to the "level flight" position; however, full control movement was established after the inspector removed the aircraft's horizontal situational indicator. The probable cause of the accident was found to be improper maintenance, which resulted in the failure of the instrument panel shock mounts.
- On April 20, 2001, a Piper PA-31 Navajo sustained damage while taxiing at Newark-Heath Airport. The pilot reported that, while taxiing to the ramp area after landing, a fire was observed in the left engine. The pilot secured the engine, and then he and the passenger evacuated the airplane. Witnesses extinguished the fire with a handheld fire extinguisher. The probable cause of the accident was found to be the company maintenance personnel's failure to comply with the service bulletin, which resulted in a fuel boost pump leakage and subsequent fire during taxi. A factor was the manufacturer's confusing service bulletin.
- On August 17, 2001, a Cessna 152 was substantially damaged during landing at the Newark-Heath Airport. The student pilot flying the aircraft said the airplane was approximately 10 to 20 feet above the runway when it encountered a "large gust from the left side" and the left wing dipped. He applied full power, and leveled the wings with the intention of performing a go-around; however, the airplane contacted the runway and bounced. The student pilot pulled back on the control wheel to climb, but the airplane nosed over onto the runway. The probable cause of the accident was found to be the student pilot's failure to maintain aircraft control during an aborted landing.
- On January 12, 2008, an amateur-built gyrocopter experienced a hard landing at the Newark-Heath Airport. The CFI was demonstrating a ballooned landing when the accident occurred. He intentionally flared the gyroplane "too high" at an altitude of 10 feet above the runway. The CFI stated the student quickly corrected so he added a "little more flare," overlooking that the gyrocopter had already begun to settle. The gyrocopter then descended vertically making hard contact with the runway. The left landing gear axle separated and the gyrocopter rolled onto its left side. The probable cause of the accident was found to be the CFI's failure to maintain control of the gyrocopter, which resulted in settling with power and the subsequent hard landing.
- On March 5, 2010, a Cessna 172 Skyhawk crashed while taking off from the Newark–Heath Airport. The student pilot was nose-high during a soft-field takeoff and did not detect that the airplane drifted toward the edge of the runway. The airplane's left main landing gear impacted a snowbank off the runway's prepared surface and the airplane nosed over. The probable cause of the accident was found to be the pilot's failure to maintain directional control during takeoff.
- On August 25, 2011, a plane crashed just after takeoff from the Newark–Heath airport. The aircraft reportedly veered south while climbing away from the runway when it clipped two trees and crashed into a home's back yard.
- On June 29, 2012, a Cessna 182 Skylane crashed while taxiing at the Newark–Heath airport. While on approach to the airport, the pilot saw a weather front approaching rapidly from the northwest. The pilot reported that the wind buffeted the airplane throughout the approach and landing. After landing the aircraft normally, the pilot taxied the airplane from the runway; however, during a turn, the airplane’s tail lifted up. The left wing and nosecone impacted the taxiway, and the airplane nosed over, coming to rest in the inverted position.
- On August 10, 2019, a small plane crashed at the airport.
- On February 1, 2022, a Cessna 182 Skylane crashed after takeoff from the Newark–Heath airport. According to troopers, the plane crashed into trees and a guard rail before sliding down a hill. The cause of the accident is under investigation.

== See also ==
- List of airports in Ohio
