= The Outlet Collection Seattle =

Shopping mall in Auburn, Washington, U.S.

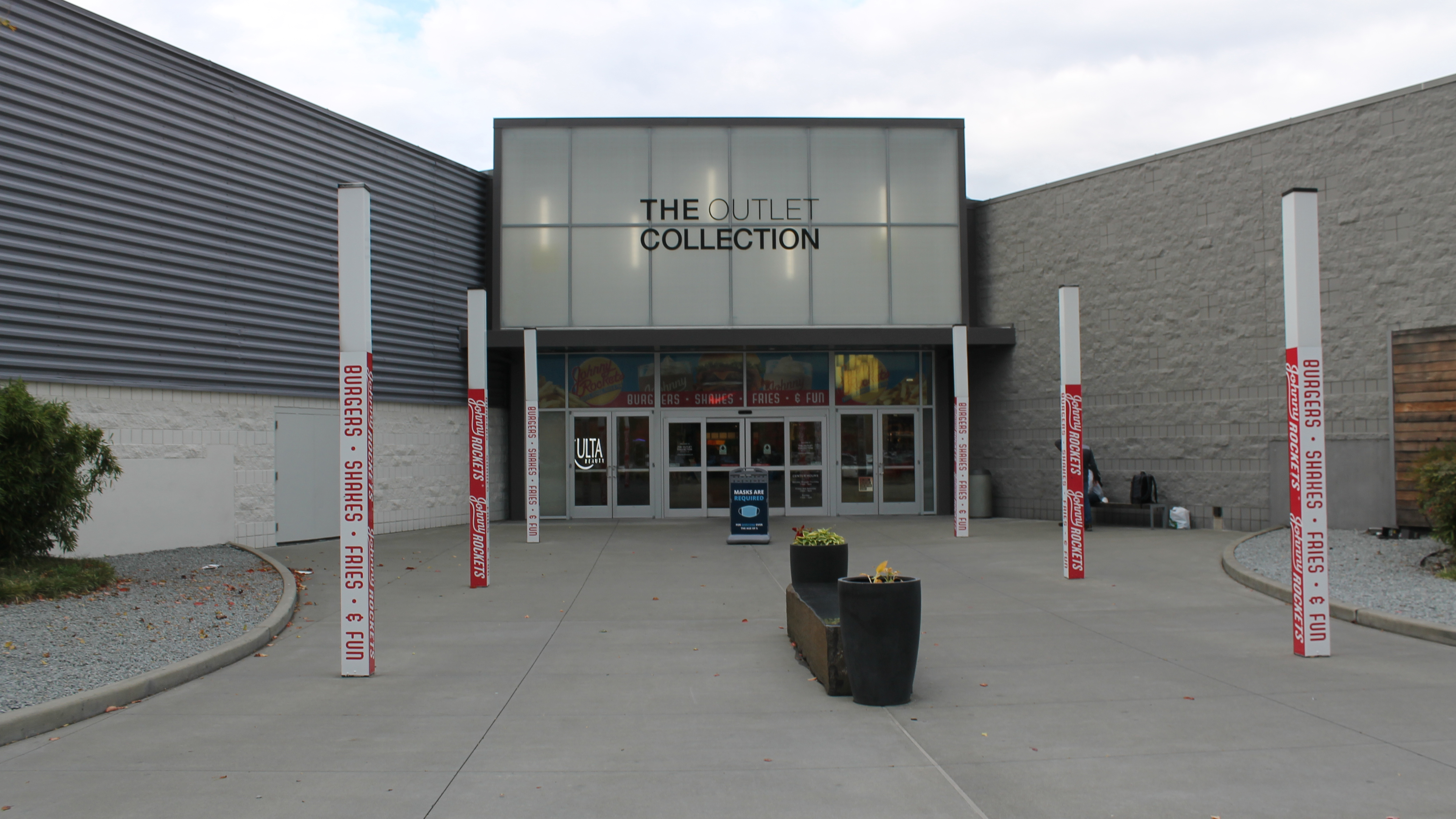
- The southeast entrance to The Outlet Collection Seattle
- Location: Auburn, Washington
- Opened: August 25, 1995; 31 years ago
- Previous names: Supermall of the Great Northwest (1995–2012)
- Developer: Glimcher Realty Trust
- Manager: Urban Retail Properties
- Owner: The Lightstone Group
- Num. of stores: 140
- Floor area: 943,273 sq ft (87,632 m²)
- Floors: 1
- Parking: Parking lot with 5,000 free spaces
- Website: outletcollectionseattle.com

The Outlet Collection Seattle is an outlet mall in Auburn, Washington, United States, that opened in August 1995. The mall is currently anchored by Burlington, Nordstrom Rack, Dave & Busters, FieldhouseUSA, and Discount Collection Depot. There is one vacant anchor space previously occupied by Best Buy Outlet. Junior anchors include Ashley HomeStore, Fitness Quest, Old Navy Outlet, and H&M. A Walmart Supercenter and Regal Cinemas movie theater are also located on mall property.

== History ==
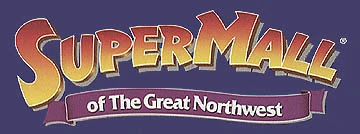
Logo used from 1995 to 2012

The interior of the mall shot in February 2026

The food court of the mall shot in December 2023

An aerial overview of the mall shot in July 2010

=== Opening ===
The mall opened on August 25, 1995, under the name Supermall of the Great Northwest, and was developed by Glimcher Realty Trust.

Its anchors then included Nordstrom Rack, Bed Bath & Beyond, Oshman's SuperSports USA (Later Sports Authority until 2016), Burlington Coat Factory, Saks Fifth Avenue (later Old Navy and Ulta Beauty), Marshalls (later Dave & Buster's), and Incredible Universe. In its first year of business, the mall contained 175 stores and drew more than 14 million customers. By 1998, Saks Fifth Avenue and one fifth of the stores had closed.

The Incredible Universe store on the north side of the mall was closed in 1997 after the company's demise; it was converted into a Sam's Club with 154,000 square feet (14,300 m^{2}).

Walmart moved to a new Supercenter location on the north side of the mall complex in October 2010 and agreed to manage the sale of its old locations on the west side of the mall. The old building was purchased by Coastal Farm & Ranch, an Oregon-based chain of outdoor and farm retail stores.

=== Renovations and rebrand ===
In May 2012, the mall, would undergo a $35 million and would rebrand and as The Outlet Collection Seattle, along with Glimcher’s other outlet mall, The Outlet Collection | Jersey Gardens (now know as The Mills at Jersey Gardens) to reflect its new focus. This renovation would include new LED lighting, updated flooring, refurbished restrooms, overhauled entrances, and a new food court, along with new exterior signage. This renovation would include new LED lighting, updated flooring, refurbished restrooms, overhauled entrances, and a new food court, along with new exterior signage, along with a new hallway of the mall connecting one side of the mall to another to improve traffic flow for the mall. The renovation had drawn interests for outlet stores to move into the newly renovated mall with new stores like Nike Factory Store, Michael Kors, J. Crew Factory Store, Brooks Brothers Factory Store, LOFT Outlet, H&M and Skechers opening up.

The Sam's Club location closed in January 2018 as part of the company's withdrawal from the Seattle market. It was replaced by FieldHouseUSA, a multipurpose indoor sports facility that was scheduled to open in 2020; the COVID-19 pandemic delayed its full opening to 2021.

In the 2020s, the former Dick’s Warehouse Sale was eventually replaced by Discount Collection Depot. Discount Collection Depot is a liquidation and overstock store that sells a wide variety of merchandise, appliances, electronics, and furniture at a discounted price.

In November 2023, Bed Bath & Beyond was replaced by Best Buy Outlet. However, the store had closed by 2026.

=== Ownership changes ===
In 2014, Glimcher Realty Trust was acquired by Washington Prime Group for $4.3 billion, in which the deal included The Outlet Collection Seattle.

The Lightstone Group acquired the mall from Washington Prime Group in November 2024 for $82 million and announced a capital improvement program that would begin at an unspecified date. Syracuse based Spinoso Real Estate Group soon after managed the mall.

In October 2025, Chicago based Urban Retail Properties announced on its LinkedIn page that it was assigned management of the mall.
