= Urban enterprise zone =

Special economic zone

An urban enterprise zone is an area in which policies to encourage economic growth and development are implemented. Urban enterprise zone policies generally offer tax concessions, infrastructure incentives, and reduced regulations to attract investments and private companies into the zones. They are a type of special economic zone where companies can locate free of certain local, state, and federal taxes and restrictions. Urban enterprise zones are intended to encourage development in deprived neighborhoods through tax and regulatory relief to entrepreneurs and investors who launch businesses in the area.

They are common in the United Kingdom and the United States. In other countries, regions with similar economic policies are often referred as export-procession zones, tax and duty-free zones, and special economic zones (SEZs) most predominantly present in China and India.

== History ==
The 1970s witnessed a shift in city planning, leaving behind post-war Keynesian policies and entering an era of growth machine. Urban planning had thrived during the 1950s and 1960s. Planning was fostered by a period of constant economic and physical growth. The economic recession of the 1970s and 1980s was compelled to transform the nature of urban planning. This shift was especially marked in the UK, when the strong capitalist economy shifted following the great recession. Britain lost its core economic motive: manufacturers.

In an urban context, cities had to create growth at any cost. Due to the stagflation of the economy, the British Centre for Policy Studies and the American Heritage Foundation challenged the theory of Keynesianism which consists of a mixed economy in the private sector accompanied by government interventions and regulations. City planning stopped regulating and controlling growth, and started promoting that growth by any possible means: through tax concession, deregulation, or infrastructure incentives. By encouraging urban growth, city authorities were expecting to boost the economy, reduce unemployment rates, and the progression of decay of its core cities.

== Theory ==
The enterprise zone concept evolved from a combination of theories, policies and social forces. The philosophy is most closely associated with the theory of supply side economics and the assumption that employers will respond positively to tax incentives and reduced government regulation. The enterprise zone philosophy suggests that by encouraging the production of goods, investment will improve; therefore, the supply of goods and services and the providing of job opportunities will increase accordingly.

As policy mechanism, enterprise zones are proposed to stimulate economic activity in decaying areas. When compared with other areas, these areas have higher unemployment rates, lower income level, lower employment opportunities, vacant land, and decayed building and infrastructures. Enterprise zone programs provide the incentives to businesses to overcome economic obstacles that hinder economic growth.

== United States ==
The United States experienced a transition similar to the UK in the 1970s. The industrial regions of New England, the northern Midwest and Mid-Atlantic were facing economic restructuring, overseas competition and profit loss. During the 1970s, it is estimated that 38 million jobs were lost due to the relocations of industries, closure, and cutbacks, and as much as 35 million were located in the industrial regions. For the regeneration, it took urban planners, politicians and economists to challenge Keynesianism and introduce Enterprise zones.

Urban revitalisation heavily influenced enterprise zones in the USA. Urban revitalisation consisted of innovative partnerships between different government levels and the private sector. The concept mainly consisted of accepting the end of the industrial-led economy and transforming the role of the inner city to a service sector economy. This revitalisation of the inner city would attract young professionals to the decaying Victorian downtown neighborhoods. This would create a new economic base to the city.

In New Jersey, for example, a municipality may request that the New Jersey Urban Enterprise Zone Authority, part of the New Jersey Department of Community Affairs designate part of a city, usually about 30%, as a UEZ. UEZs are usually located in the industrial and/or commercial portions of a city, within a continuous boundary. A 50% reduction in the general Sales tax rate (from 6.625% to 3.3125% as of January 1, 2018) and hiring incentives, are designed to reinvigorate the business climate within the Zone. These incentives have led to the construction of numerous malls and big-box retailers in parts of the development zone located near major highways, such as the Elizabeth Center and Jersey Gardens Outlet Center in the largely industrial city of Elizabeth along the New Jersey Turnpike. Among New Jersey's 565 municipalities, 27 now participate in the program.

== Critical assessment ==
=== Asia ===
The general critique of enterprise zones is whether the system of tax breaks and easing of planning regulations (as has occurred in Asia, notably in free trade zones of Singapore and Hong Kong where Peter Hall sought inspiration in the 1970s) can transition successfully into sustainable economic growth as the zone is wound down, or whether by special pleading or inertia, breaks and incentives remain in place to stop 'capital flight'. A persistence of low-wage jobs, rapid turnover of the firms, little inward investment, or persistent subsidy to enterprise, would not indicate a successful transition.

=== United Kingdom ===
In the UK, a government-commissioned evaluation in 1987 found that from 1981 to 1986, the enterprise zones had cost nearly £300 million but 2,800 firms were established in them, employing over 63,000 people. Taking local transfers into account (a notable example being the Merry Hill Shopping Centre in the West Midlands, which largely consisted of shops which had relocated from the nearby town of Dudley), only 13,000 net jobs had been created; a possible reason why the government began to prefer urban development corporation quangos as their main vehicle for urban renewal. However, a notable success has been the London Docklands, largely derelict and with unsatisfactory transport infrastructure thirty years ago when a zone was first established, now a financial and media powerhouse.

In fact, the London situation is example of dual long-lasting special zones. The City of London was for years a special region in London, being one of the early examples of it. Despite this, after London lost its port status because of technology and rising prices, the created revival vision London Docklands was in fact creation of second nearby special zone; mainly populated with financial companies, that hundreds of years ago would have chosen the city, but now instead chosen Docklands, while the city is slowly converting to tourist heritage park (one of examples is the Stock Exchange Building, where the London Stock Exchange moved away, and it was converted to the tourist-luxury shopping centre), and for example car owners and parking spaces are limited, with extra payment just for "entry", during the working week which is not endorsed by private-public owning of Docklands, which also approves new buildings containing itself lot of working places and vehicle parking spaces.

In 2012, the Conservative-Lib Dem coalition government designated 24 new enterprise zones in England, and then extended the list to 44 in 2015.

=== United States ===
The Evansville, Indiana Enterprise Zone Program was established in 1984 as one of Indiana's first five enterprise zones. A study published in 1989 by Barry M. Rubin and Margaret G. Wilder examined the 2.1 mi.^{2} area using the technique of shift-share analysis to determine whether the zone was having a measurable impact on local economic development. (The choice to use the shift-share analysis method with the larger metropolitan area as the reference region allowed Rubin & Wilder to go a step further than previous studies and exclude "external effects" that might be stimulating or depressing regional economic growth and development.) The study found that the Evansville zone did provide significant employment growth that could not be accounted for by external effects or the industrial composition of the zone itself. The zone was also found to be extremely cost-effective in its job creation.

Overall, the consensus on the effectiveness of enterprise zones in the US is mixed at best. Lambert and Coomes (2001) found that the Louisville, Kentucky enterprise zone mostly benefited large corporations rather than small entrepreneurs and did not benefit local neighborhoods at all, even though community re-development was a goal. More importantly, in a book that reviewed most major enterprise zone studies done in the 1980s and 1990s as well as conducting its own original work, Peters and Fisher (2002) consider most state and local enterprise zone programs to have come up short in achieving their goals and objectives.
