= Glimcher Realty Trust =

Real estate investment trust

- Industry: Real estate investment trust
- Founded: 1959; 67 years ago (as The Glimcher Company)
- Founder: Herbert Glimcher
- Fate: Acquired by Washington Prime Group
- Successors: Simon Property Group; WP Glimcher
- Headquarters: Columbus, Ohio
- Key people: Michael P. Glimcher, Chairman & CEO; Mark E. Yale, CFO
- Revenue: ▲$381 million (2013)
- Net income: ▲ -$37 million (2013)
- Total assets: ▲$2.659 billion (2013)
- Total equity: ▼$651 million (2013)
- Number of employees: 981 (2013)

Glimcher Realty Trust was a real estate investment trust based in Columbus, Ohio that invested in shopping malls. In 2015, the company was acquired by Washington Prime Group.

== History ==
The company was founded as The Glimcher Company by Herbert Glimcher in 1959, who started in the lumber business. Throughout much of its history, the company's largest tenant was Kmart.

In 1998, the company acquired 5 shopping malls for $375 million.

In 1999, the company received a $1 billion investment from Nomura Holdings to build 4 shopping centers.

On January 26, 1994, the company became a public company via an initial public offering.

In 2004, the company sold 25 properties for $103.1 million.

In 2007, the company sold University Mall in Tampa, Florida for $149 million.

In 2010, the company closed a $320 million joint venture with The Blackstone Group, which included the sale of a 60% interest in 2 malls.

In 2011, the company completed an asset swap with DDR Corp. in which the company sold Polaris Towne Center and purchased Town Center Plaza for $139 million.

In 2013, the company acquired University Park Village in Fort Worth, Texas for $105 million. The company also acquired Blackstone's 60% interest in WestShore Plaza.

In 2015, the company was acquired by Washington Prime Group for $4.3 billion in stock and cash. As part of the transaction, Jersey Gardens and University Park Village were sold to Simon Property Group for $1.09 billion.

== Investments ==
As of December 31, 2013, the company owned interests in 28 shopping centers in 15 states in the United States containing 19.3 million square feet of gross leasable area.

Notable properties wholly owned by the company included the following:

Property Name	Location
Puente Hills Mall	City of Industry, California
WestShore Plaza	Tampa, Florida
Ashland Town Center	Ashland, Kentucky
New Towne Mall	New Philadelphia, Ohio
Northtown Mall	Blaine, Minnesota
The Outlet Collection Jersey Gardens	Elizabeth, New Jersey
Dayton Mall	Miami Township, Montgomery County, Ohio
Indian Mound Mall	Newark, Ohio
Polaris Fashion Place	Columbus, Ohio
The Mall at Fairfield Commons	Beavercreek, Ohio
Lloyd Center	Portland, Oregon
Colonial Park Mall	Harrisburg, Pennsylvania
Mall at Johnson City	Johnson City, Tennessee
Grand Central Mall	Vienna, West Virginia
The Outlet Collection Seattle	Auburn, Washington
Weberstown Mall	Stockton, California
Merritt Square Mall	Merritt Island, Florida
Eastland Mall	Columbus, Ohio
Pearlridge Center	Aiea, Hawaii
Town Center Plaza	Leawood, Kansas
