= The Mills at Jersey Gardens =

Shopping mall in Union County, New Jersey, U.S.

Coordinates: 40.6595°N 74.1717°W

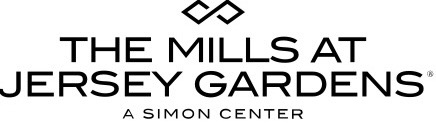

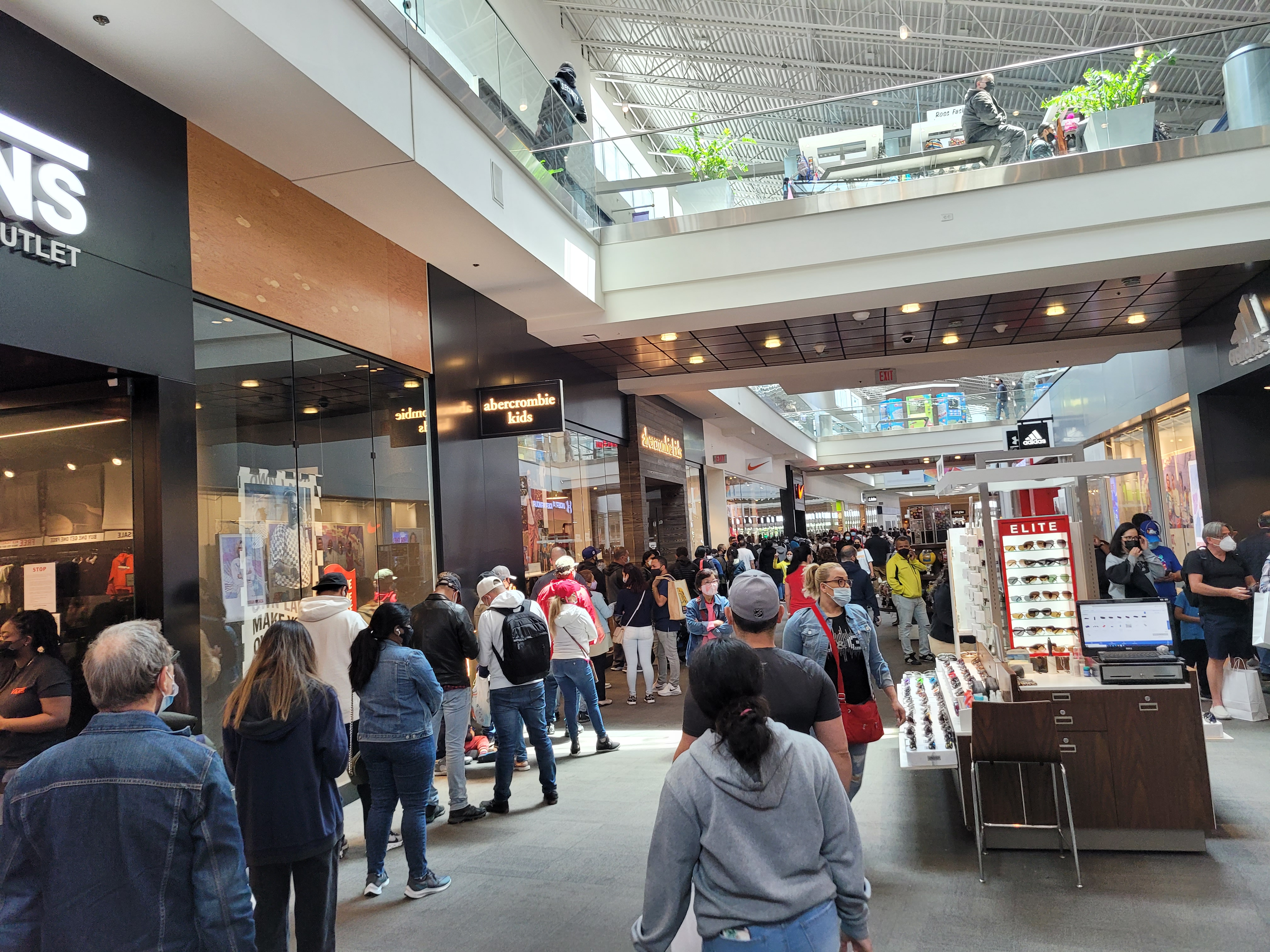
- Interior view, first floor (May 2021)
- Location: Elizabeth, New Jersey, United States
- Address: 651 Kapkowski Road, 07201
- Opened: October 21, 1999; 27 years ago
- Renovated: 2012–2013; 2015–2018
- Previous names: Jersey Gardens (1999–2013); The Outlet Collection (2013–2015)
- Developer: Glimcher Realty Trust
- Manager: Simon Premium Outlets; The Mills: A Simon Company
- Owner: Simon Property Group
- Num. of stores: 230+ (at peak)
- Num. of anchor tenants: 10 (at peak)
- Floor area: 1,292,611 square feet (120,000 m^{2})
- Floors: 2
- Public transit: NJ Transit bus: 24, 40, 111, 115
- Website: www.simon.com/mall/the-mills-at-jersey-gardens
- Building details
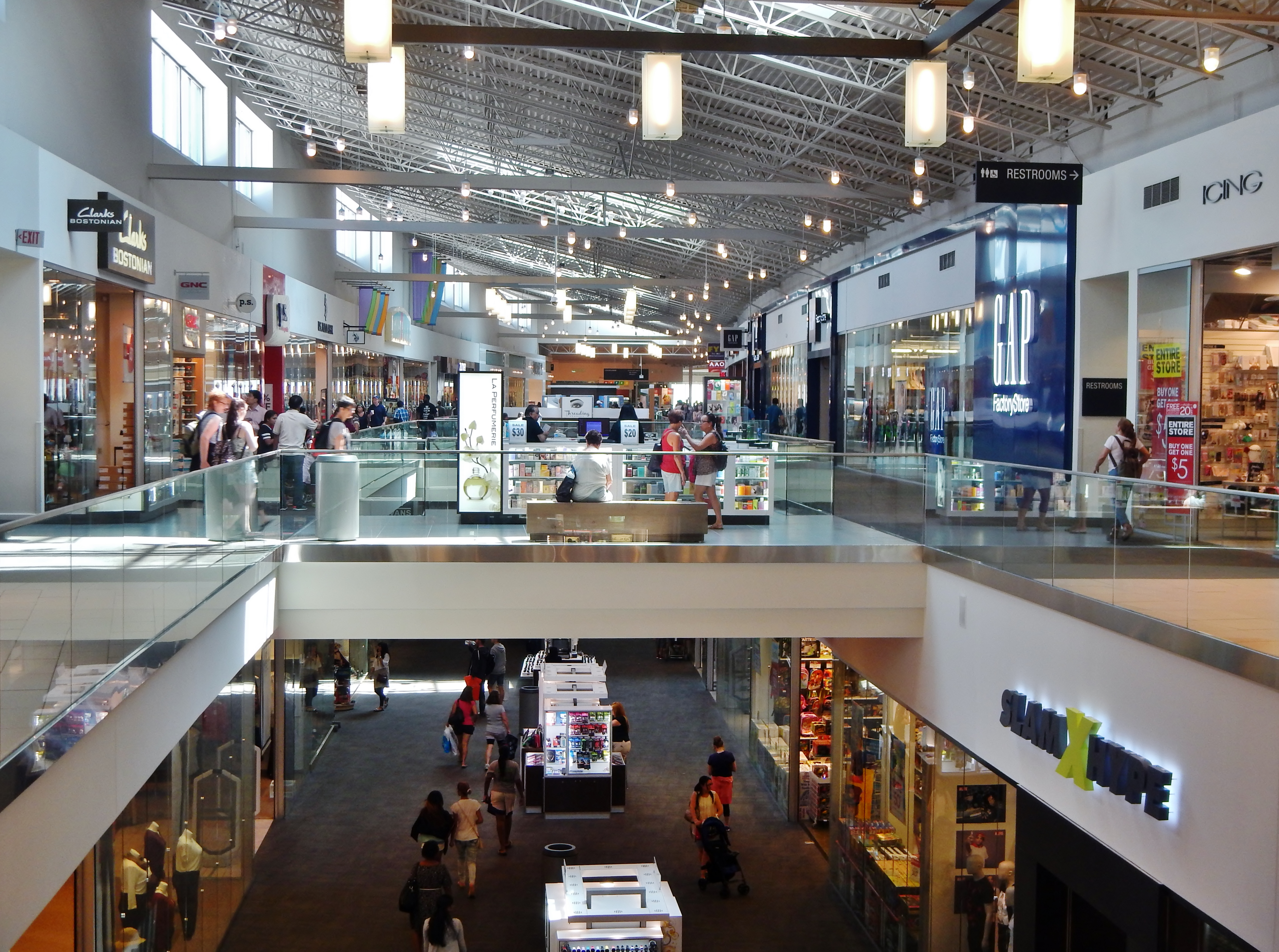
- Interior view, second floor (August 2015)

General information
- Status: Operational
- Construction started: November 1998; 28 years ago
- Completed: 1999

Renovating team
- Architects: Callison; BendheimGlass
- Main contractor: IBEX Construction

The Mills at Jersey Gardens, originally and also still colloquially called Jersey Gardens, is a super-regional outlet mall in Elizabeth, New Jersey. The mall opened on October 21, 1999, and is the largest outlet mall in New Jersey, and much closer to New York City than its largest outlet mall competitor, Woodbury Common Premium Outlets. The shopping center has a gross leasable area of 1,292,611 square feet (120,087.5 m^{2}).

The mall was developed by Glimcher Realty Trust and formerly operated by them. In October 2013, the mall was remodeled as The Outlet Collection | Jersey Gardens. In January 2015, it was sold to Simon Property Group as part of an acquisition of Glimcher by Simon's spinoff Washington Prime Group. Simon owns and manages much of Jersey Gardens' outlet mall competition in the area, including Woodbury Common, and has integrated Jersey Gardens into its Mills retail platform by renaming it The Mills at Jersey Gardens.

== History ==
Despite the term "Mills" in its name and its current owner (Simon Property Group), the mall was never developed or operated by the Mills Corporation.

=== 1992–1999: Development and opening ===
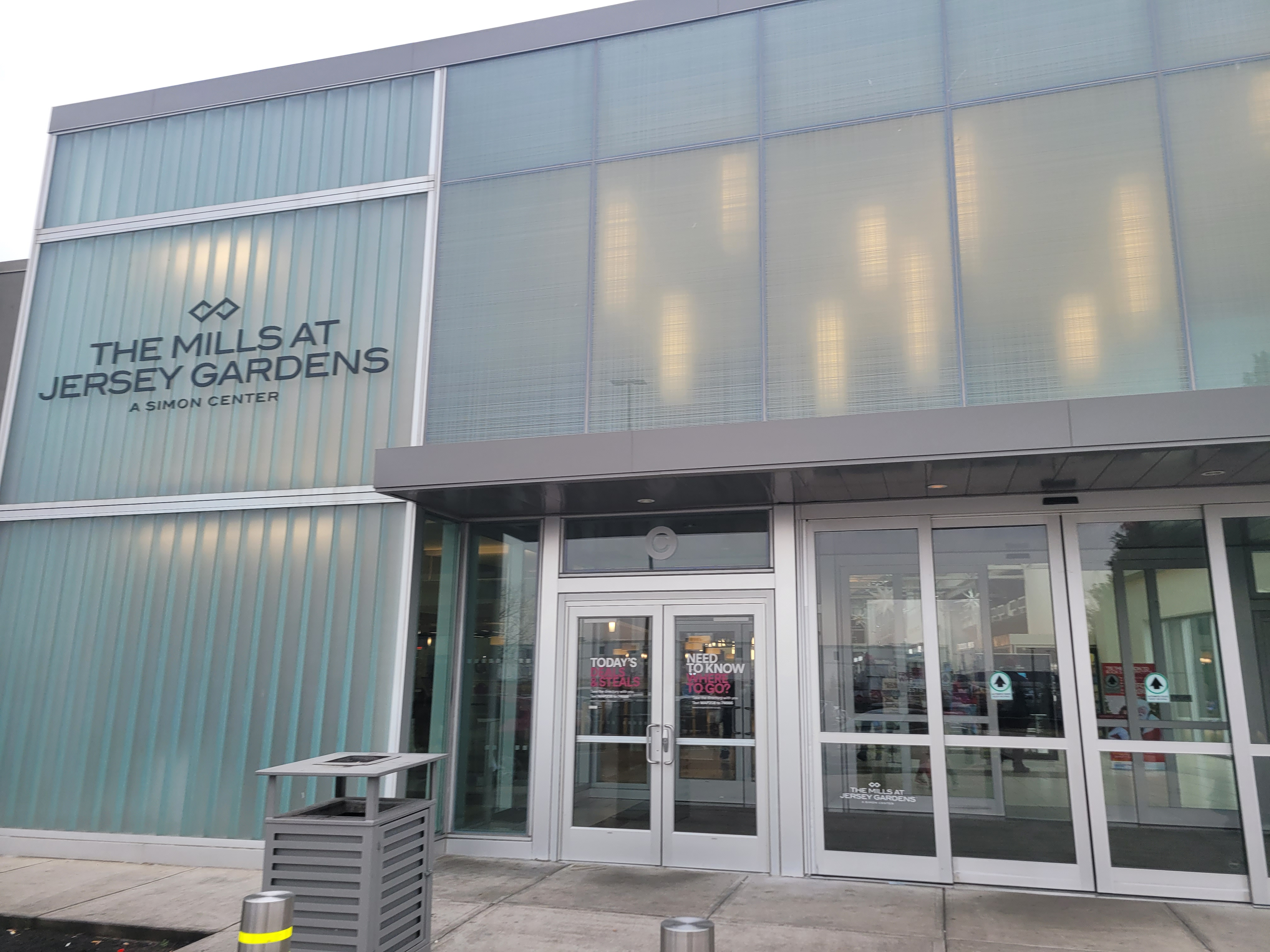
Main entrance - December 2021

Jersey Gardens was built on a former landfill acquired by OENJ Corporation in 1992, which required extensive brownfield remediation prior to the mall development. This involved landfill capping with recyclables like dredged harbor materials and construction debris, installation of methane gas collection systems, and PCB containment measures. In 1996, 130 acres (53 ha) of the former landfill site were sold to Glimcher Realty Trust of Ohio for development, with the remediation efforts earning a 2001 U.S. Environmental Protection Agency Phoenix Award for brownfield redevelopment. Plans for the 1,300,000-square-foot (120,000 m^{2}) outlet center were announced in early 1998 by Glimcher Realty Trust, emphasizing the sites proximity to the New Jersey Turnpike and its location in an Urban Enterprise Zone, making purchases eligible for a reduced 3½% (now 3.3125% as of January 1, 2018) sales tax rate, a potent lure for New York City residents paying a sales tax rate over 8%.

Construction began in November 1998 following site preparation, with the project financed through a combination of $163 million in bank loans from Bankers Trust and Huntington National Bank, $56 million in equity from Glimcher, and $140 million in tax-exempt bonds and grants from the New Jersey Economic Development Authority. On May 25, 1999, it was announced that Jersey Gardens would open in October, and include nearly 190 tenants, including Burlington Coat Factory, Saks Off 5th, Marshalls, and Neiman Marcus Last Call. The interior of the mall was designed by The Rockwell Group, and would serve as a direct competitor to the then-proposed Meadowlands Mills. The mall was nearly completed by late August 1999.

=== After opening ===
In May 2012, Glimcher Realty Trust announced that Jersey Gardens would be renovated and rebranded as The Outlet Collection | Jersey Gardens. This would include new LED lighting, updated flooring, refurbished restrooms, and the installation of a solar power roof. The renovation cost $30 million, was designed by Callison and BendheimGlass, and constructed by IBEX Construction. This added Coach Outlet, Coach Men, True Religion Outlet, Calvin Klein Accessories, Tommy Hilfiger Store, Lego Store, and Century 21 Department Store to the mall. Century 21 debuted as a concept store in mid-May 2013, and on September 29, 2013, it was announced that the mall would reopen on October 30. Glimcher cited the renovation as an inspiration from Fifth Avenue flagships.

On January 15, 2015, Jersey Gardens, alongside University Park Village, was acquired by Simon Property Group for $1.09 billion. As part of the acquisition, the mall rebranded as The Mills at Jersey Gardens. Glimcher itself was acquired by Washington Prime Group, a corporate spinoff of Simon. The name change was to implement Jersey Gardens into Simon's Mills portfolio, which consisted of super-regional outlet malls originally developed by the Mills Corporation, which Simon acquired in April 2007. On May 21, 2015, Mills president Gregg Goodman announced a massive 411,000-square-foot (38,200 m^{2}) expansion. This project was designed to add new outlet brands, dining options, and entertainment to the existing 200-store footprint. The debut was expected to take place in 2018.

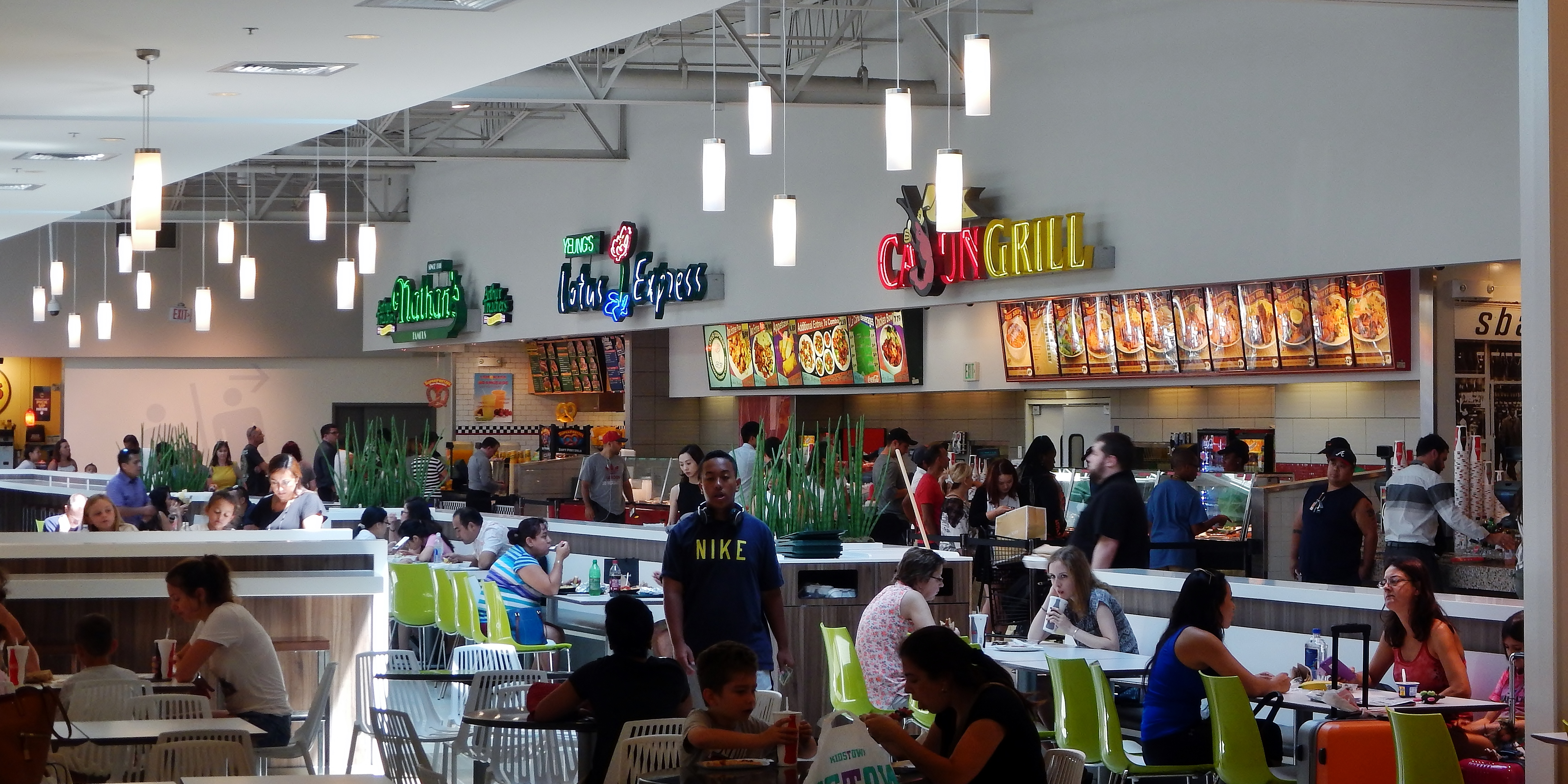
The Dining Pavilion in August 2015

On April 19, 2017, Simon announced another massive 411,000-square-foot (38,200 m^{2}) expansion that would add a seven-story, 98-foot-tall parking garage to Jersey Gardens—with an estimated 3,313 spaces—as a result of increased traffic. New big-box stores, restaurants, including ones with outdoor seating, and retail uses would be added. A seasonal food court branded as the Dining Pavilion at The Mills at Jersey Gardens would be added on the second level, alongside an additional entrance. 50-foot light poles and road modifications would also be included. The new wing was proposed to connect to the existing mall near the AMC Loews Jersey Gardens 20 & IMAX movie theater. This proposal was noticed on April 6 during an Elizabeth Planning Board meeting. On November 16, 2019, Neiman Marcus Last Call closed permanently, affecting 25 employees. This left the off-price division of Neiman Marcus with one remaining location in New Jersey, being Bergen Town Center in Paramus.

On March 18 through 19, 2020, Simon temporarily closed all of its U.S. properties, including Jersey Gardens, due to the COVID-19 pandemic. The mall reopened to the public on June 29, but under social distancing conditions. In late August, Lord & Taylor announced that it would close its store at Jersey Gardens — alongside all other remaining locations — by early 2021 due to Chapter 11 bankruptcy protection as a result of the pandemic. Century 21 closed by October 5, 2020, after the department store had filed for bankruptcy in September.

Bed Bath & Beyond closed permanently in February 2023 as a result of liquidation after filing for Chapter 11 bankruptcy. By late May 2023, Irish store Primark was preparing to open at Jersey Gardens on July 6. Tory Burch Outlet would debut on August 30, 2023, near the mall's center court on the first floor. Round1 Bowling & Arcade opened in the former Bed Bath & Beyond space on March 1, 2025, with a ribbon-cutting ceremony.

In April 2025, the Lids store at the mall introduced a refreshed concept that featured "Build-A-Cap" kiosks for digital customization. This was part of a plan to modernize nearly 20 Lids store locations. In May 2025, Uniqlo announced that it would open in the mall's upper level. Saks Off 5th closed permanently on January 30, 2026, after parent company Saks Global filed for Chapter 11 bankruptcy.

== Gallery ==
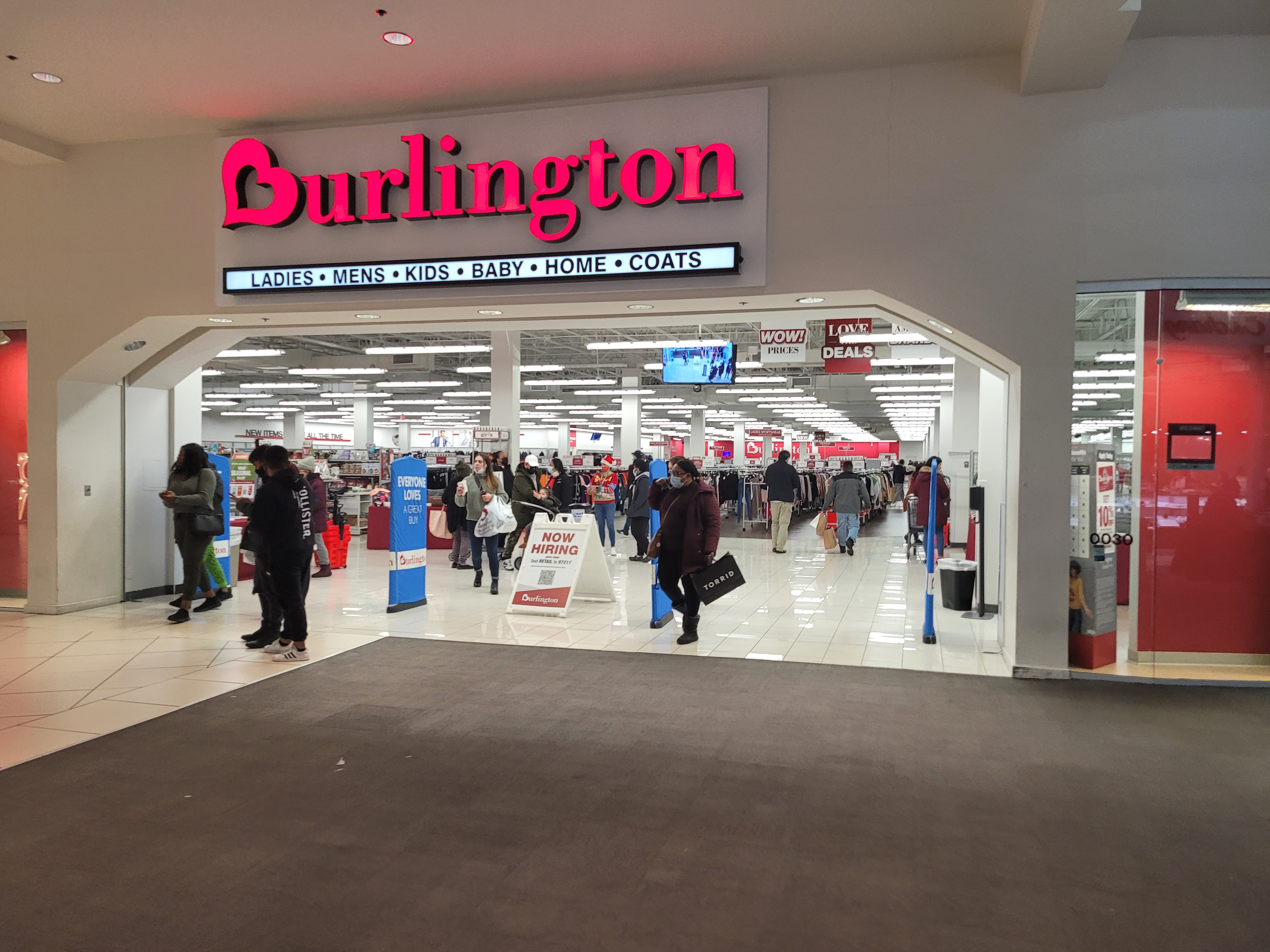
Burlington (December 2021)

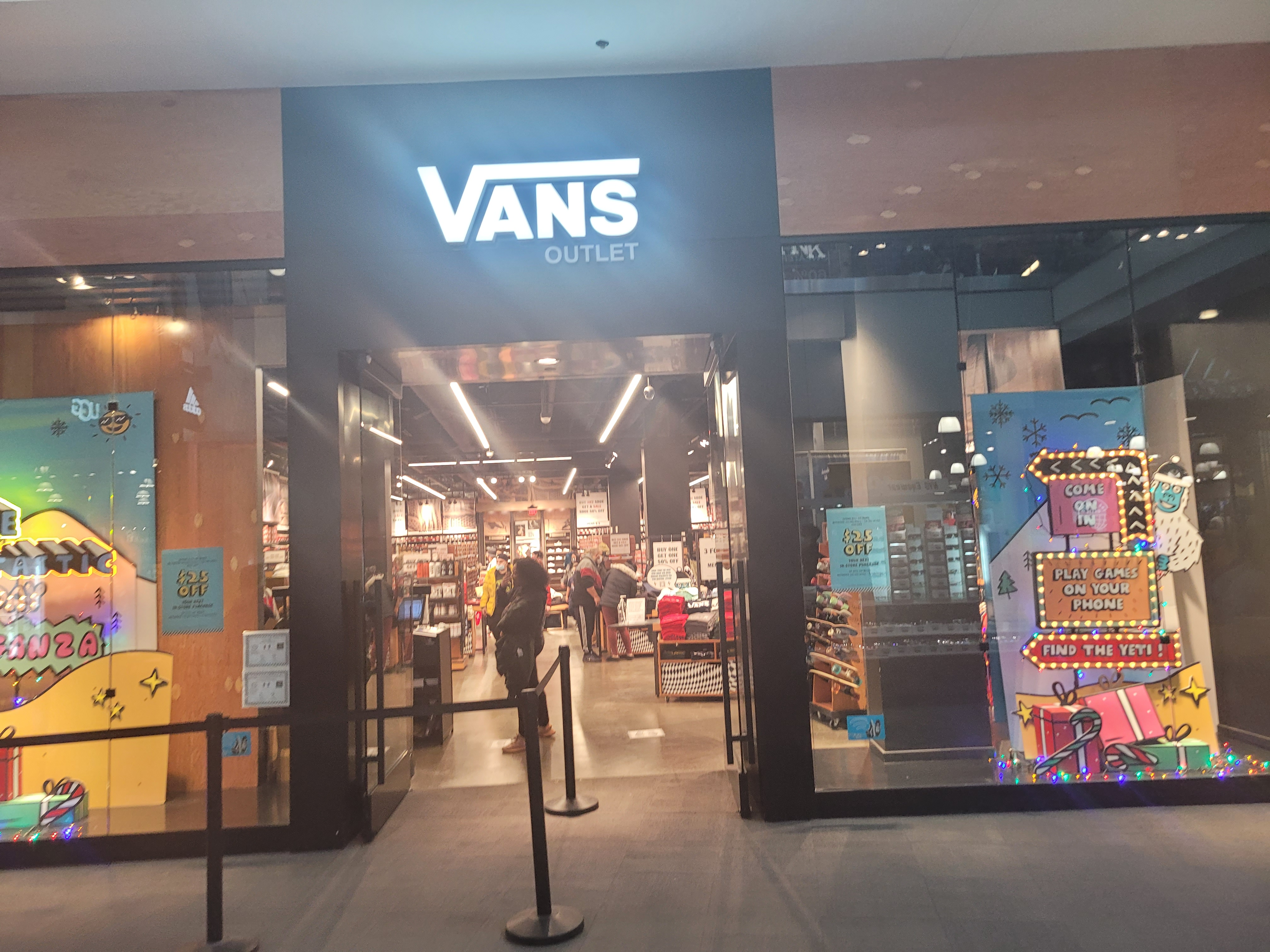
Vans Outlet (December 2021)

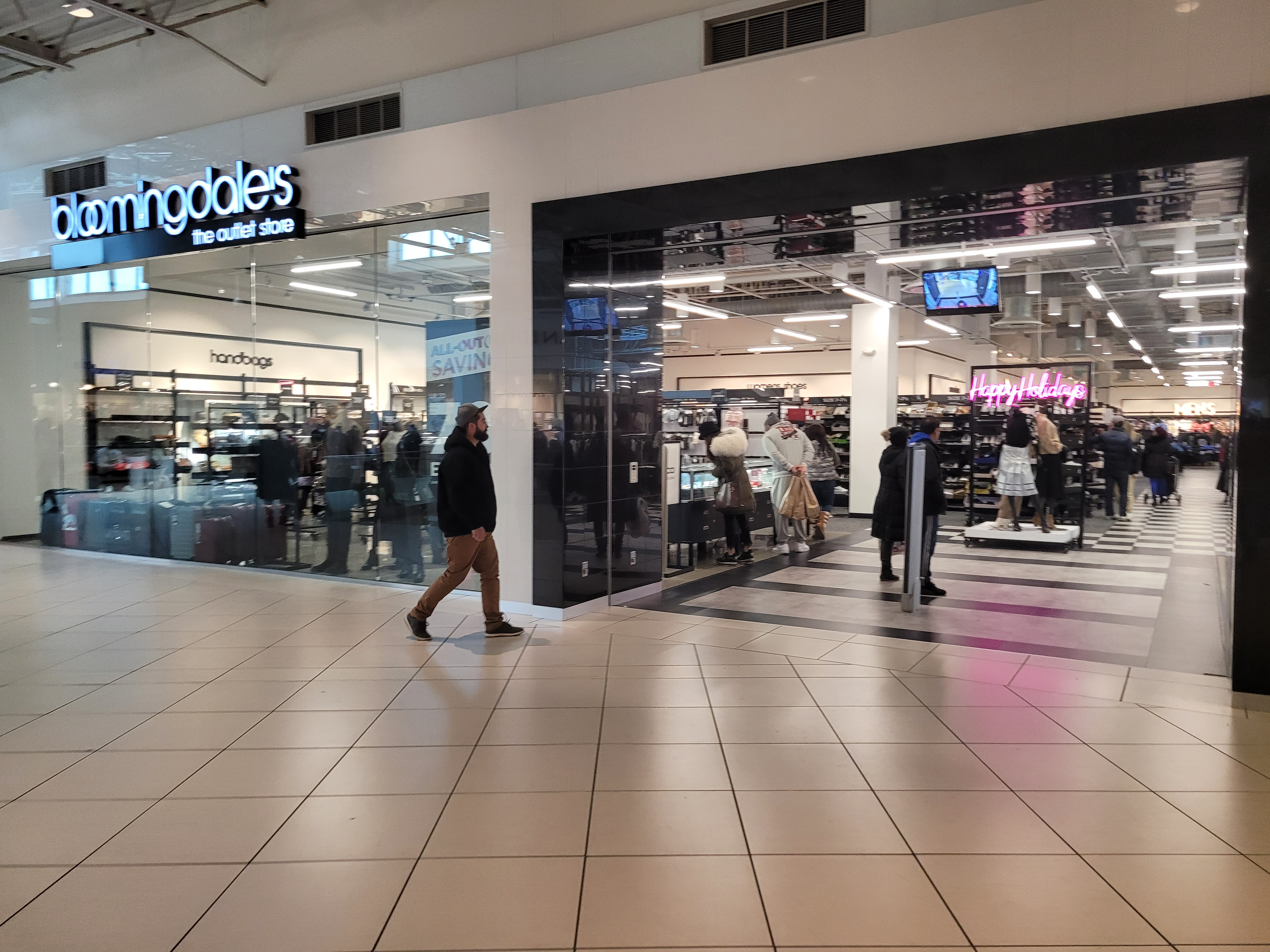
Bloomingdale's Outlet (December 2021)

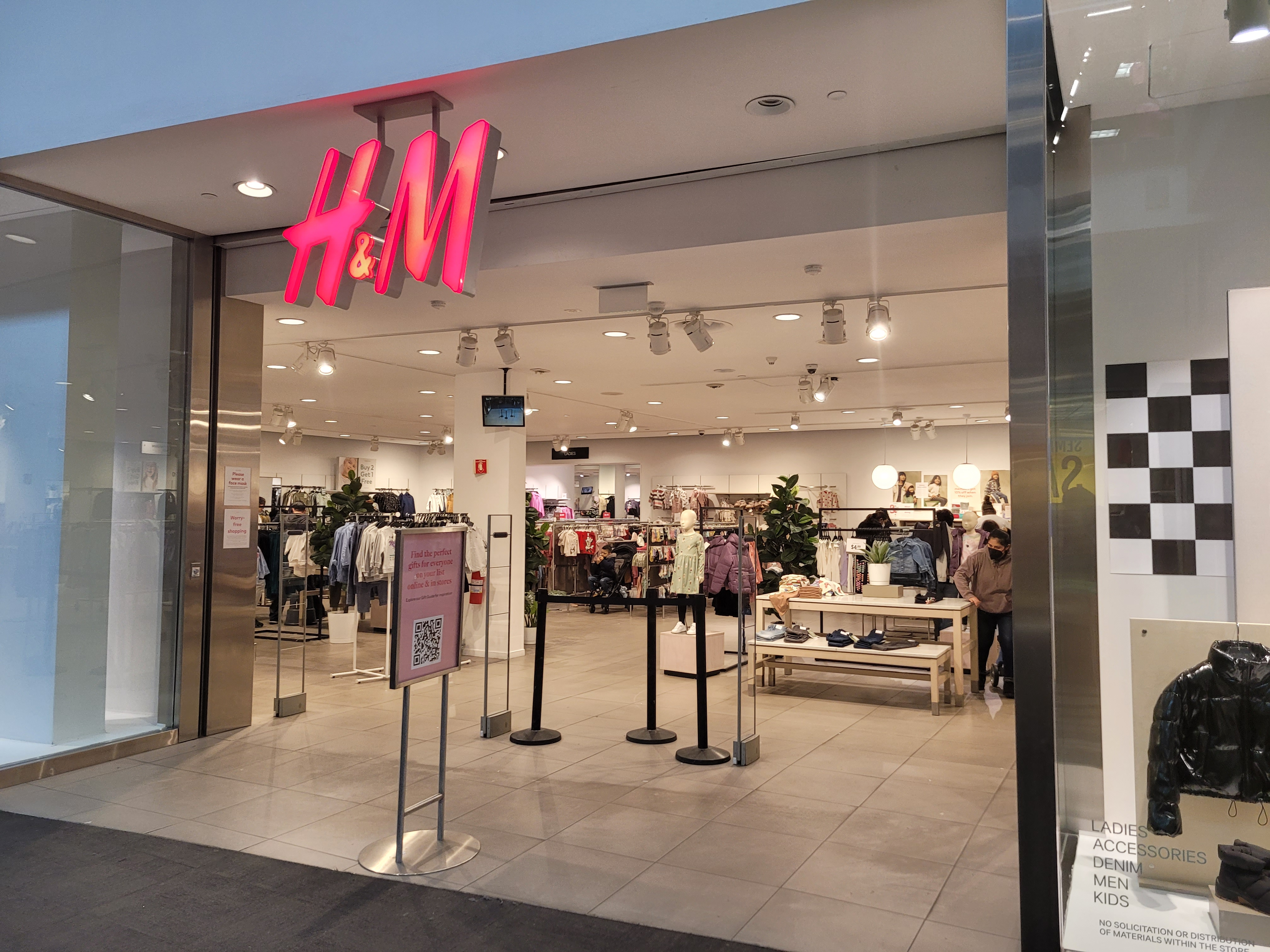
H&M (December 2021)

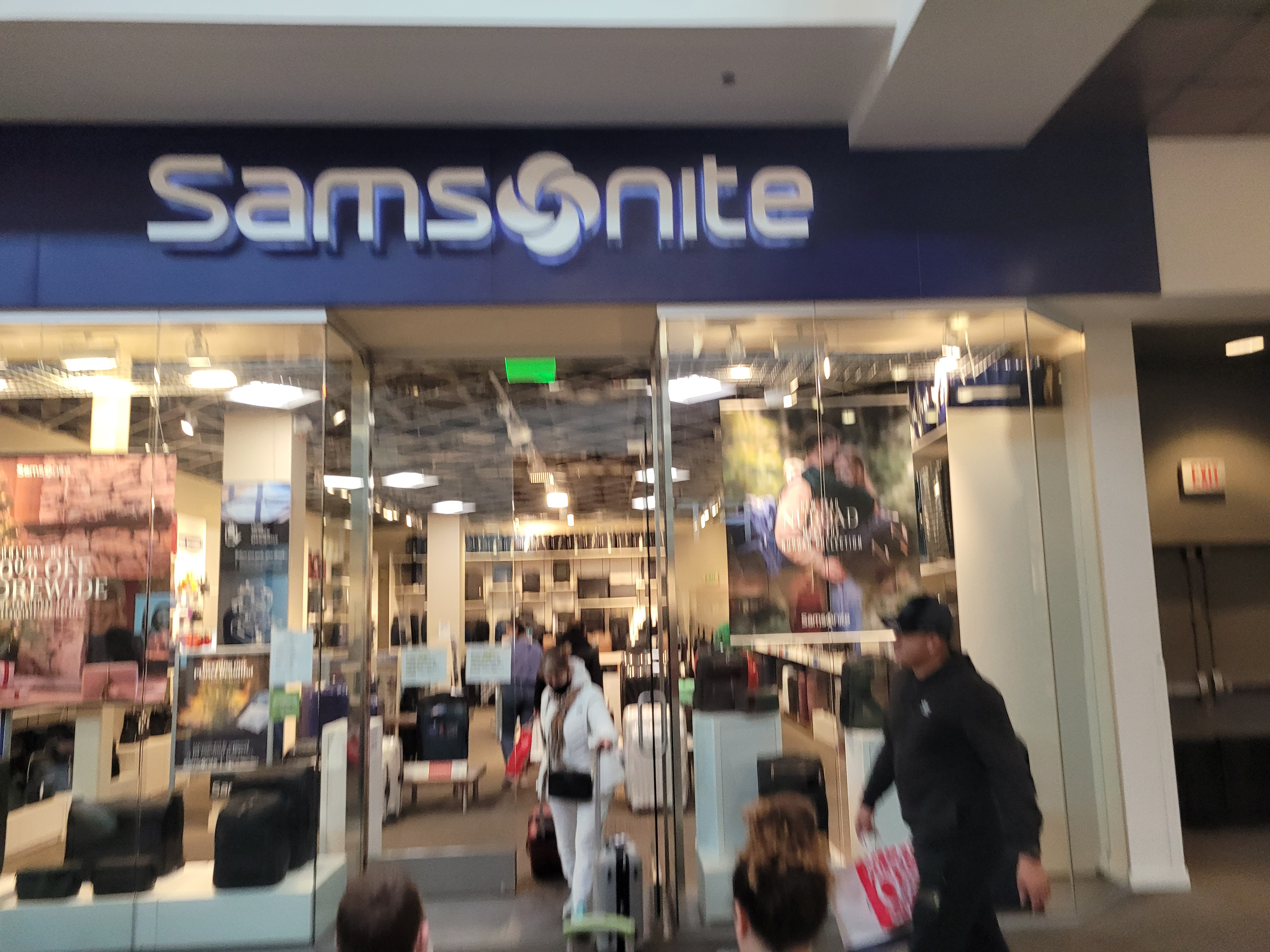
Samsonite Outlet (December 2021)

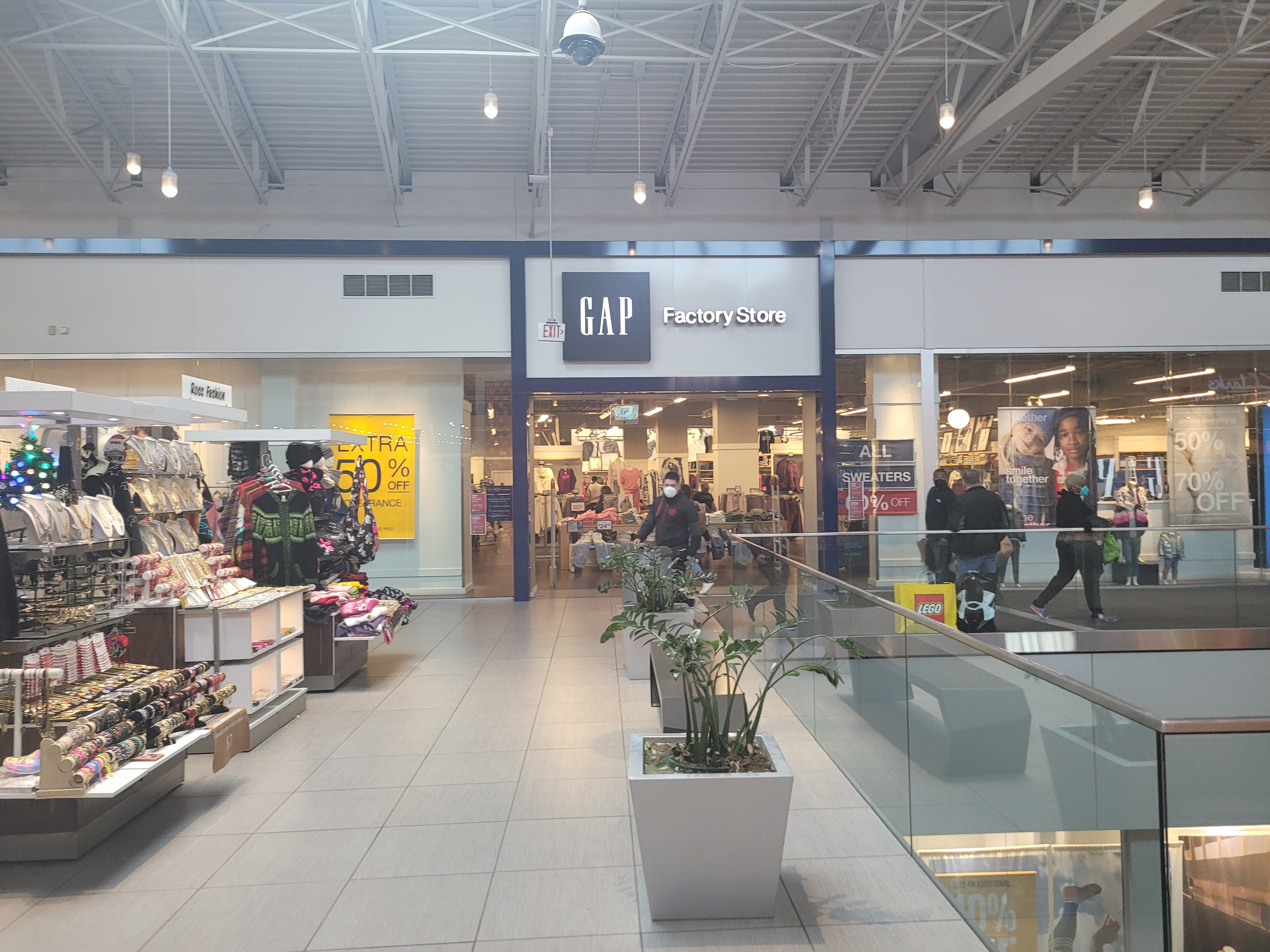
Gap Factory Store (December 2021)

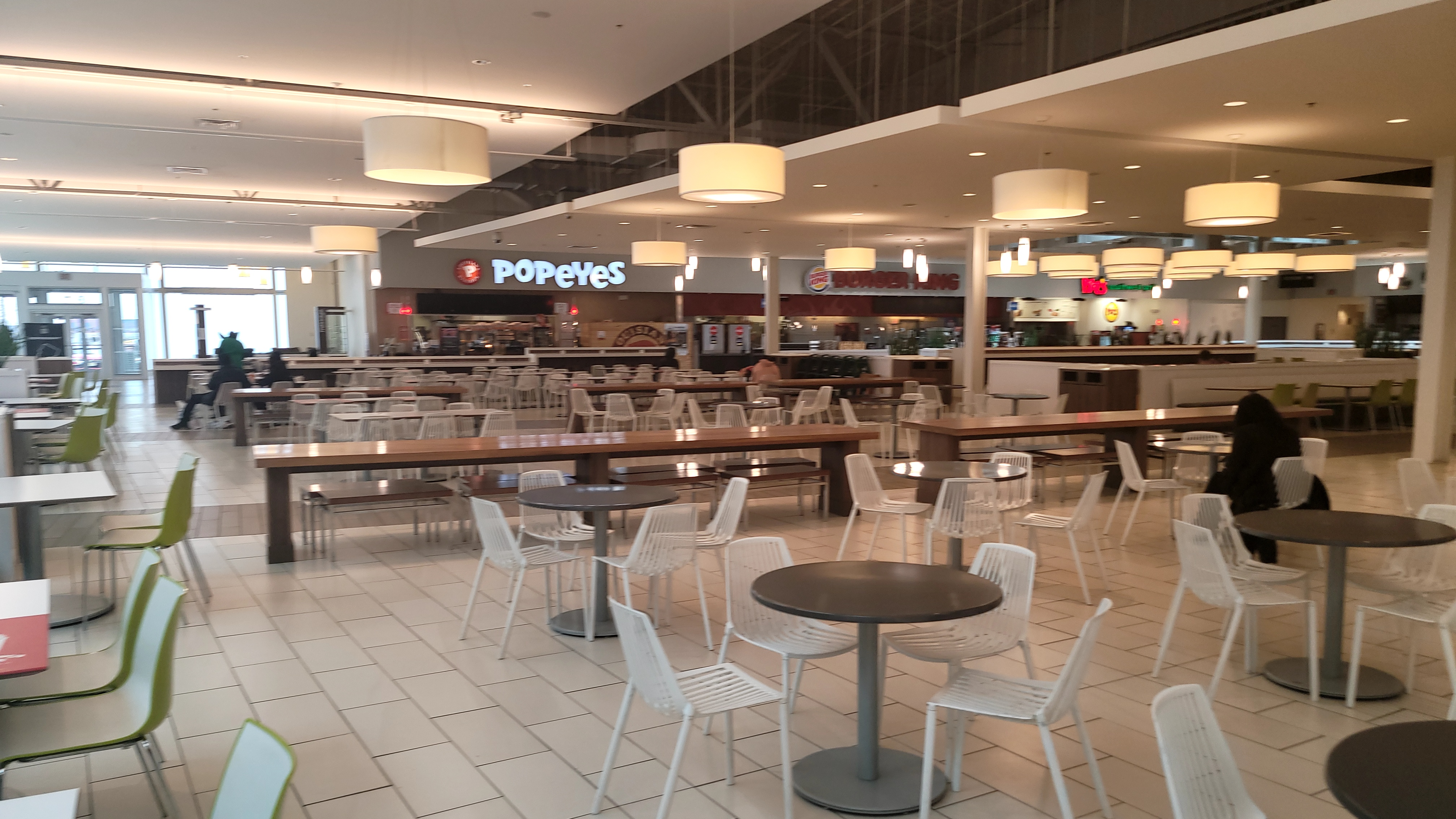
Dining Pavilion (December 2021)

== See also ==
- The Outlet Collection Seattle
- Arundel Mills
- Sherway Gardens
- American Dream (shopping mall)
