= Heath, Ohio =

- City
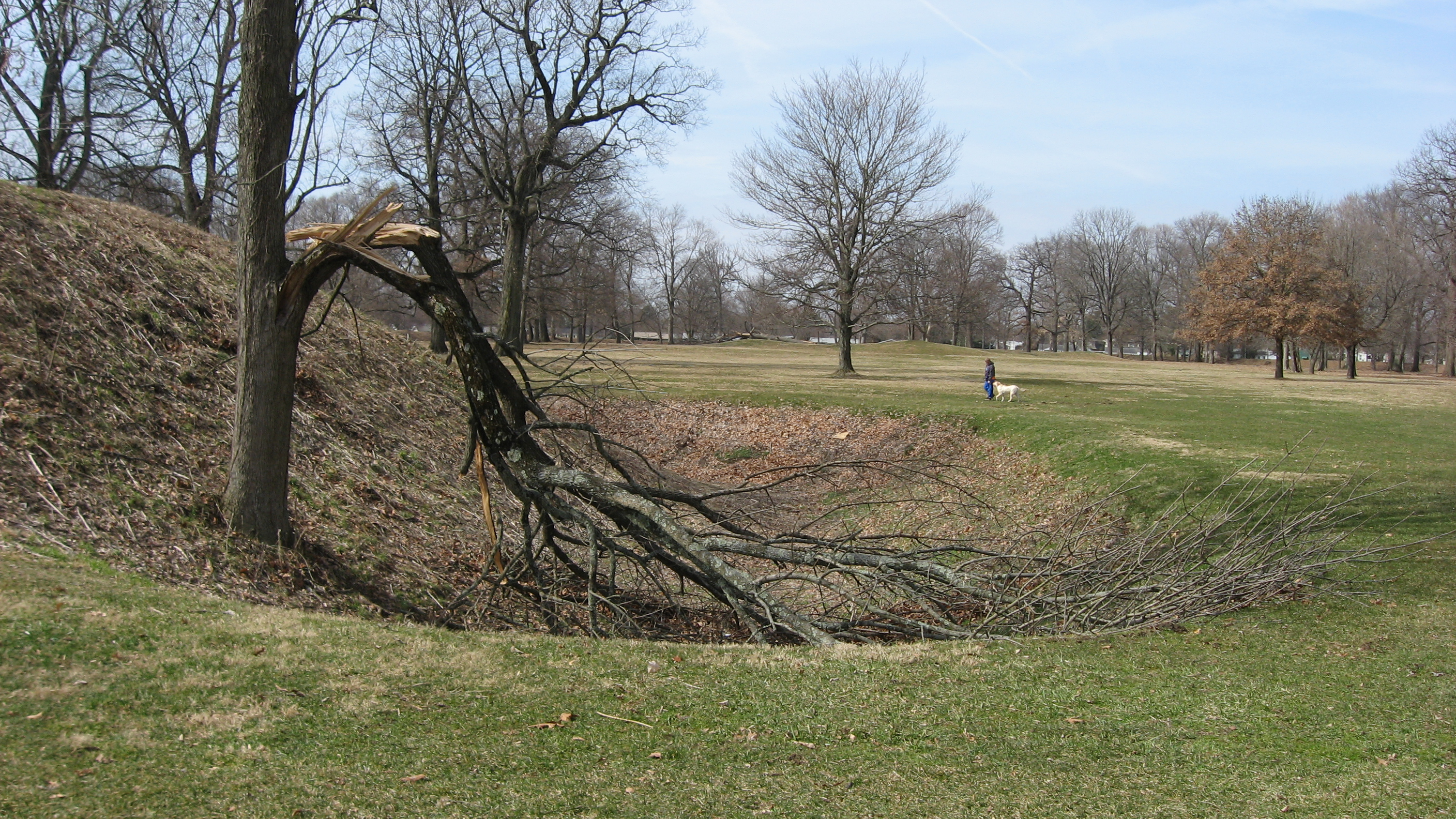
- Entrance to the Great Circle Earthworks
- Motto: "City of Progress——Citizens With Pride"
- Location of Heath, Ohio, in Licking County

- Location within Ohio Location within the United States
- Coordinates: 40°01′23″N 82°26′30″W
- Country: United States
- State: Ohio
- County: Licking

Area
  - Total: 11.14 sq mi (28.84 km^{2})
  - Land: 11.06 sq mi (28.65 km^{2})
  - Water: 0.073 sq mi (0.19 km^{2})
- Elevation: 837 ft (255 m)

Population (2020)
  - Total: 10,412
  - Estimate (2023): 10,693
  - Density: 941.1/sq mi (363.38/km^{2})
- Time zone: UTC-5 (Eastern (EST))
  - Summer (DST): UTC-4 (EDT)
- ZIP code: 43056
- Area code(s): 740&220
- FIPS code: 39-34748
- GNIS feature ID: 1086463
- Website: https://www.heathohio.gov

Heath is a city in Licking County, Ohio, United States, and is located approximately 30 mi (48 km) east of Columbus. The population was 10,412 at the 2020 census.

== History ==
This area is known to have been populated by the Hopewell Indians through the first century CE. They built large earthworks, including ancient burial mounds which are now preserved within Moundbuilders State Memorial on the north side of the city.

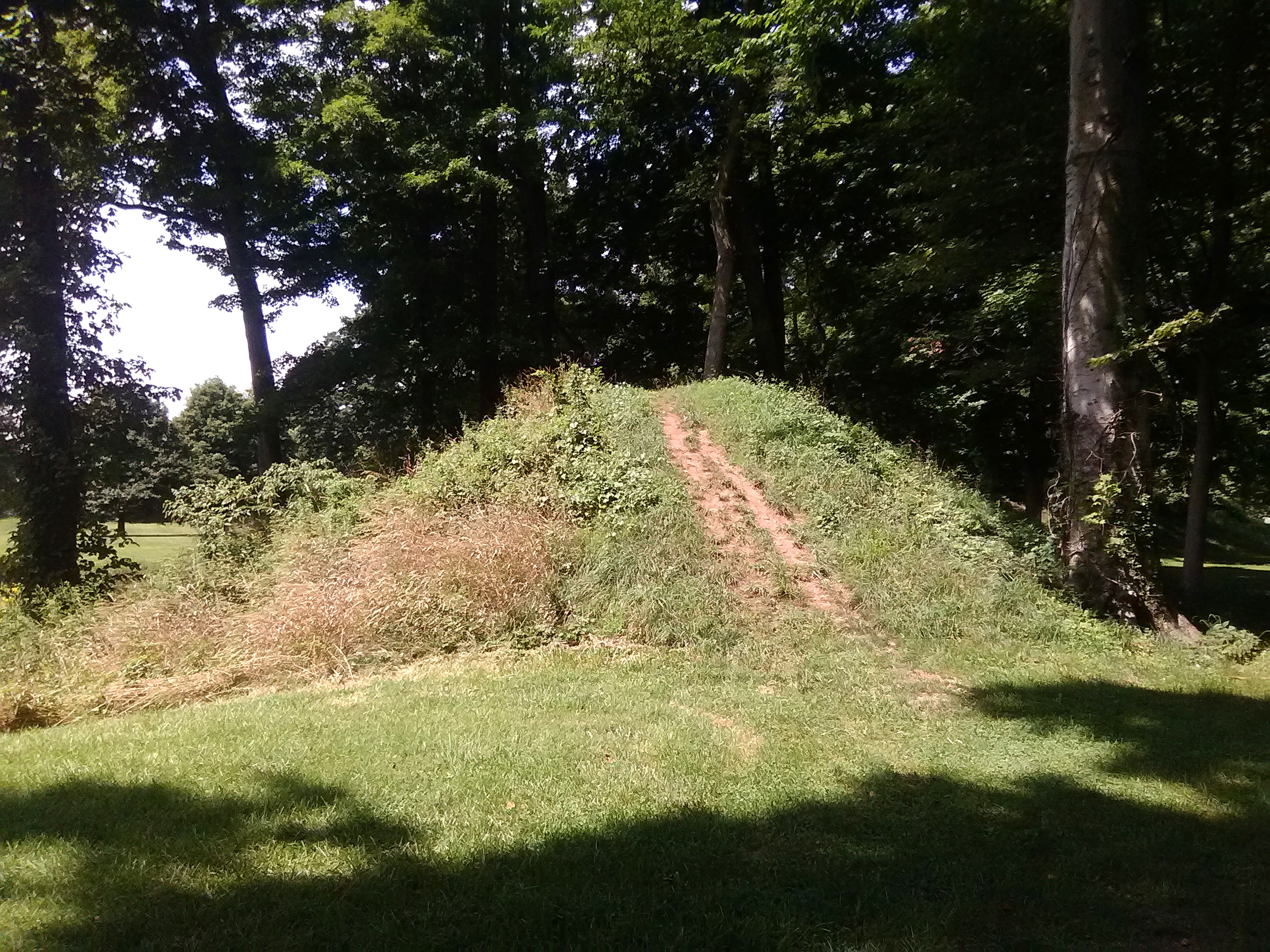
A mound in the Great Circle Earthworks

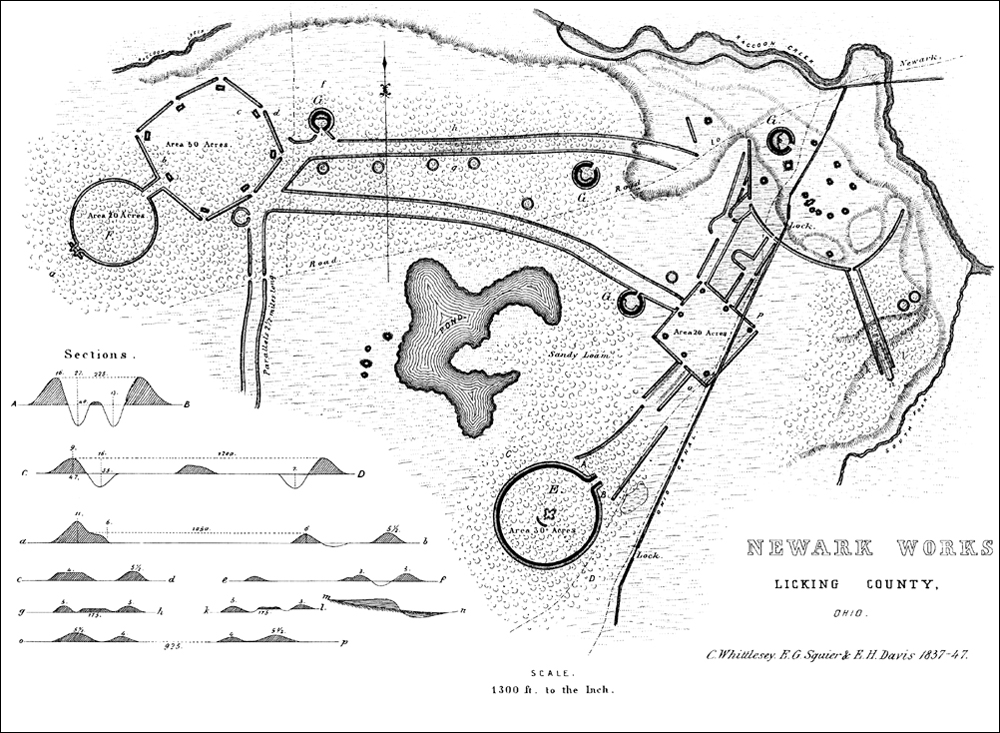
19th-century plan of the Works

This also has the Great Circle Earthwork, considered part of the Newark Earthworks, which has two other sections within the boundaries of nearby Newark, Ohio. The complex originally covered more than 3,000 acres, and was surveyed before 1850 by a team for the Smithsonian Institution. The 1,054-foot (321 m)-wide Newark Great Circle is one of the largest circular earthwork in the Americas, at least in construction effort. A 5-foot (1.5 m) deep moat is encompassed by walls that are 8 feet (2.4 m) high; at the entrance, the dimensions are even more grand.

The Newark Earthworks is operated as a state park by the Ohio History Connection. Designated as a National Historic Landmark, in 2006 the Newark Earthworks was also designated as the "official prehistoric monument of the State of Ohio."

=== European-American settlement ===
Early European-American settlement did not take place until the nineteenth century. Much of the county was originally devoted to agriculture. In the process of clearing and cultivating land, farmers destroyed some of the earthworks in the 19th and 20th centuries. Other development also encroached on the ancient works.

After World War II, Newark Air Force Base was established here, and it operated for 35 years as the seat of United States Air Force Aerospace Guidance and Metrology Center. This function is now served by AFMETCAL and the contractor-operated Air Force Primary Standards Lab.

Heath was incorporated as a village in 1952, with Richard Hoback being elected as the first mayor. Over the next decade, Heath grew quickly, going from a population of 2,426 in 1960 to 6,066 in 1965, when it was chartered as the 196th city in Ohio. It is one of three in the county.

In 1986, Indian Mound Mall opened in Heath, the first and only indoor shopping mall in Licking County. By 1990, the city had a population of 7,231. Despite the large population growth on the western edge of Licking County, Heath remains the third-largest municipality in the county, and one of only three cities. Other residential areas nearby include Newark, Granville, and Hebron.

== Geography ==
According to the United States Census Bureau, the city has a total area of 11.00 square miles (28.49 km^{2}), of which 10.92 square miles (28.28 km^{2}) is land and 0.08 square miles (0.21 km^{2}) is water.

== Demographics ==
Historical population
Census	Pop.	Note	%±
1960	2,426		—
1970	6,768		179.0%
1980	6,969		3.0%
1990	7,231		3.8%
2000	8,527		17.9%
2010	10,310		20.9%
2020	10,412		1.0%
2023 (est.)	10,693		2.7%

=== 2020 census ===
As of the 2020 census, Heath had a population of 10,412. The median age was 43.3 years, with 21.5% of residents under the age of 18 and 21.4% 65 years of age or older. For every 100 females there were 90.2 males, and for every 100 females age 18 and over there were 88.2 males age 18 and over.

There were 4,335 households in Heath, of which 26.5% had children under the age of 18 living in them. Of all households, 46.0% were married-couple households, 17.4% were households with a male householder and no spouse or partner present, and 29.8% were households with a female householder and no spouse or partner present. About 31.5% of all households were made up of individuals and 15.9% had someone living alone who was 65 years of age or older.

There were 4,548 housing units, of which 4.7% were vacant. The homeowner vacancy rate was 1.2% and the rental vacancy rate was 5.7%.

96.7% of residents lived in urban areas, while 3.3% lived in rural areas.

Racial composition as of the 2020 census
Race	Number	Percent
White	9,402	90.3%
Black or African American	271	2.6%
American Indian and Alaska Native	19	0.2%
Asian	75	0.7%
Native Hawaiian and Other Pacific Islander	8	0.1%
Some other race	71	0.7%
Two or more races	566	5.4%
Hispanic or Latino (of any race)	211	2.0%

=== 2010 census ===
As of the census of 2010, there were 10,310 people, 4,131 households, and 2,772 families residing in the city. The population density was 944.1 inhabitants per square mile (364.5/km^{2}). There were 4,426 housing units at an average density of 405.3 per square mile (156.5/km^{2}). The racial makeup of the city was 93.7% White, 2.6% African American, 0.2% Native American, 0.7% Asian, 0.6% from other races, and 2.2% from two or more races. Hispanic or Latino of any race were 1.5% of the population.

There were 4,131 households, of which 32.8% had children under the age of 18 living with them, 49.0% were married couples living together, 13.1% had a female householder with no husband present, 5.1% had a male householder with no wife present, and 32.9% were non-families. 27.6% of all households were made up of individuals, and 13.2% had someone living alone who was 65 years of age or older. The average household size was 2.45 and the average family size was 2.96.

The median age in the city was 40.1 years. 24.3% of residents were under the age of 18; 7.8% were between the ages of 18 and 24; 24.7% were from 25 to 44; 26.2% were from 45 to 64; and 16.9% were 65 years of age or older. The gender makeup of the city was 47.9% male and 52.1% female.

=== 2000 census ===
As of the census of 2000, there were 8,527 people, 3,403 households, and 2,375 families residing in the city. The population density was 816.6 inhabitants per square mile (315.3/km^{2}). There were 3,593 housing units at an average density of 344.1 per square mile (132.9/km^{2}). The racial makeup of the city was 95.59% White, 1.98% African American, 0.33% Native American, 0.82% Asian, 0.01% Pacific Islander, 0.32% from other races, and 0.95% from two or more races. Hispanic or Latino of any race were 1.01% of the population.

There were 3,403 households, out of which 32.9% had children under the age of 18 living with them, 55.1% were married couples living together, 10.9% had a female householder with no husband present, and 30.2% were non-families. 25.5% of all households were made up of individuals, and 10.8% had someone living alone who was 65 years of age or older. The average household size was 2.46 and the average family size was 2.94.

In the city, the population was spread out, with 24.9% under the age of 18, 8.1% from 18 to 24, 29.7% from 25 to 44, 22.3% from 45 to 64, and 15.0% who were 65 years of age or older. The median age was 37 years. For every 100 females, there were 90.2 males. For every 100 females age 18 and over, there were 87.0 males.

The median income for a household in the city was $40,120, and the median income for a family was $50,156. Males had a median income of $35,781 versus $25,143 for females. The per capita income for the city was $20,890. About 4.2% of families and 8.5% of the population were below the poverty line, including 10.2% of those under age 18 and 11.4% of those age 65 or over.

== Education ==
The Heath City School District includes the Heath High School

== Infrastructure ==
The Licking County Regional Airport is located in the city.
