= Indian Mound Mall =

Shopping mall in Heath, Ohio

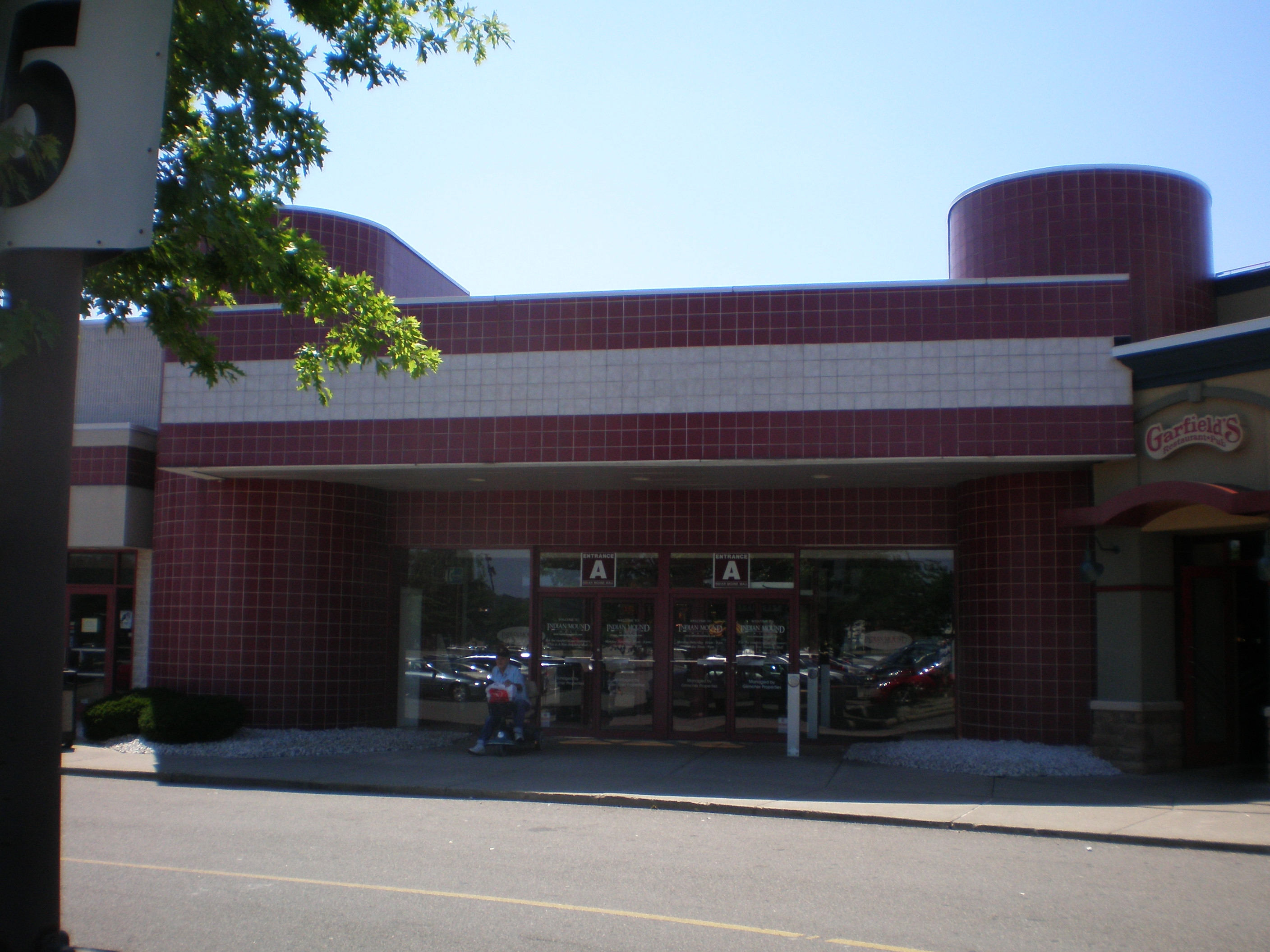
- Main entrance
- Location: Heath, Ohio, United States
- Coordinates: 40.031311°N 82.447586°W
- Address: 771 South 30th Street
- Opened: October 23, 1986
- Developer: Glimcher Realty Trust
- Num. of stores: 65
- Num. of anchor tenants: 6 (5 open, 1 under construction)
- Floor area: 557,479 square feet (51,791.5 m^{2})
- Floors: 1
- Parking: 3,201 spaces

Indian Mound Mall is a shopping center located in Heath, Ohio. It opened its doors on October 23, 1986. The mall's current anchor stores are AMC Theatre, Big Sandy Superstore, Altitude Trampoline Park, Dick's Sporting Goods, and JCPenney. There is one anchor space that is currently under construction and set to become a new trade school and training facility for electricians and apprentices led by the Newark Electrical Joint Apprenticeship and Training Committee (JATC).

== History ==
Indian Mound Mall opened its doors on October 23, 1986, becoming the second indoor shopping mall in Licking County. The mall's first logo consisted of a circle with lines, and a feather that represents the native American Indian, which has "Indian Mound Mall" written on it. The original anchor stores consisted of the following: Elder-Beerman, JCPenney, Lazarus, and Hills. Crown Cinema was added to the rear of the mall in 1988. A fountain was originally located in the center of the mall from 1986 to 1997. The same year the fountain was removed, the mall added Sears to replace a freestanding store nearby, and the Crown Theaters expanded from six screens to eleven screens, which became a Hollywood Theater. In 2016, AMC Theatres bought the Hollywood Theater. In 1998, Elder-Beerman was expanded, and later closed on August 26, 2018, adding 20,000 square feet (1,900 m^{2}).

Target opened next to the mall in July 1995. In 1999, Hills was replaced by Ames, which in turn closed in 2002. Steve & Barry's moved into the empty store in 2004. Lazarus closed in 2004, becoming Goody's the following year. Goody's closed at the end of May 2008, and became Dick's Sporting Goods in 2011. Steve & Barry's was replaced in 2017 by Big Sandy. It was announced in early February that Lee's Kitchen Chinese restaurant would close marking the last restaurant in the Food Court. Lee's kitchen closed in early March 2020. And put a spiral of closures, when Seraphinas coffee shop closed in 2014, after being in the Food Court for over 2 years. That all changed after Osaka Japanese Grill closed up shop after a 20 year run at Indian Mound Mall in 2018. FYE left the same year 2 weeks after Osaka Grill closed. There is even a Developmental Disability center in the mall called Blend, which opened and closed after there was a tenant/owner dispute and came with baggage. The disagreement came during the COVID-19 lockdown. Leaving the mall without a DD (Developmental Disability) program hosted by Licking County Board Of Developmental Disabilities. The program did not last long enough to make any revenue citing a restructuring at the DD BOARD. The replacement for Blend became Spark inc. and C4 community drop in center.The mall is 10 city blocks south of Roman Atwood’s laundry mat. Soon the LDS Church will be building a grocery store outside at the old Stacey’s restaurant location. On August 31, 2019, it was announced that Sears would be closing this location a part of a plan to close 92 stores nationwide. The store closed in December of that year.

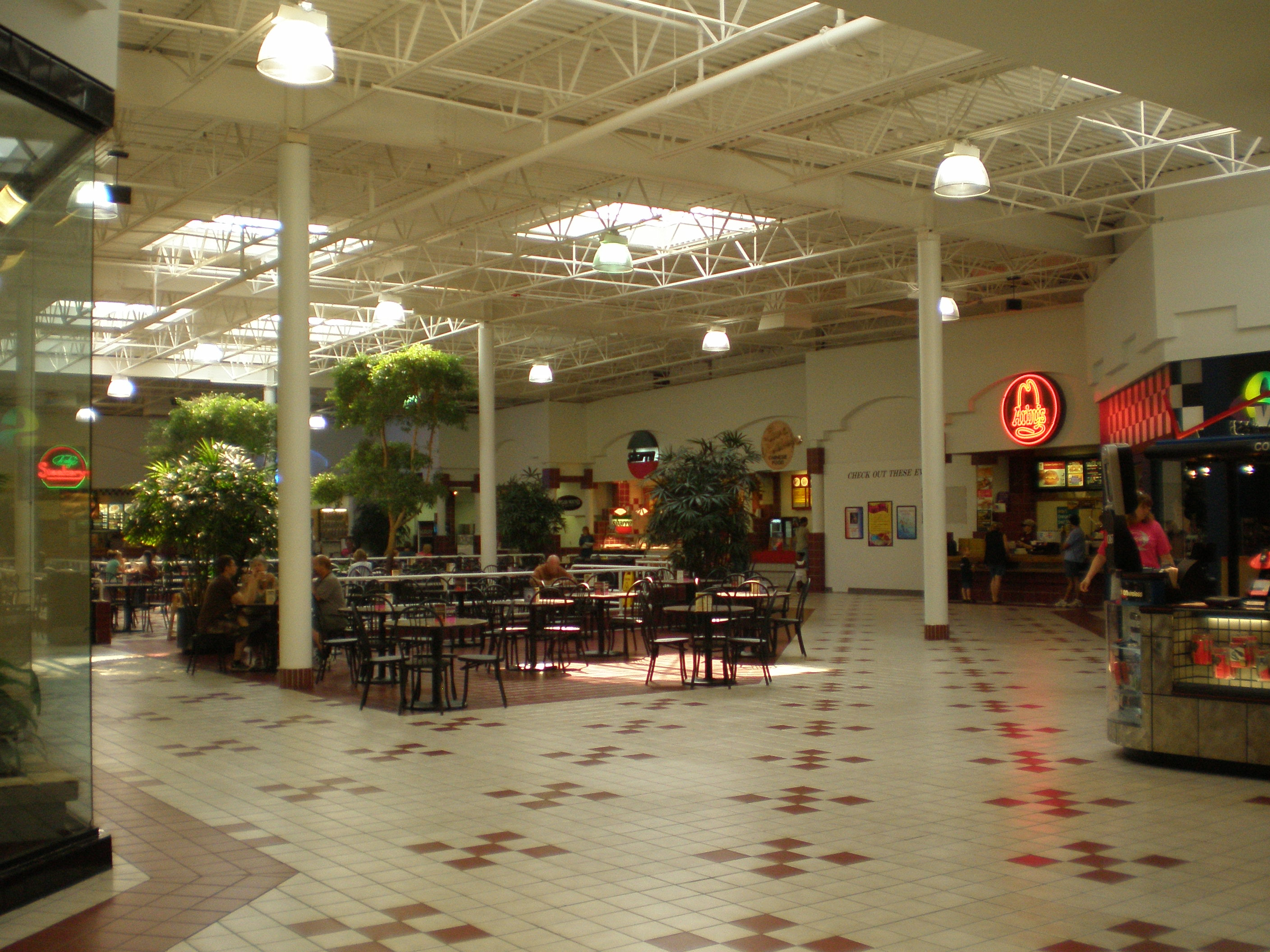
Food court

The newest anchor Altitude Trampoline Park opened its doors November 18, 2020 in a portion of the old Elder-Beerman space. Apex Fitness Center is now open 24-hours a day for clients to work out and train.

In 2025, plans began on converting the former Sears building into a training center for electricians and apprentices. The Newark Electrical Joint Apprenticeship and Training Committee (JATC) purchased the former Sears building at Indian Mound Mall. The large space will allow for expanded labs, updated training equipment, and the ability to train up to 2,000 electricians each year. Leaders say the new setup will let them prepare workers for the highly specialized electrical systems that large tech companies require. The Newark Electrical Joint Apprenticeship is currently developing a what will become a trade school to operate out of the anchor space.

Updated renovation pictures of Indian Mound Mall taken October 10, 2013.
