= Washington Prime Group =

Real estate investment trust

Washington Prime Group Inc.
- Logo used from 2022 to present
- Formerly: WP Glimcher (2015–2016)
- Traded as: wpg
- Industry: Real estate investment trust
- Founded: May 28, 2014; 12 years ago
- Founder: Simon Property Group
- Headquarters: Columbus, Ohio, U.S.
- Key people: Christopher Conlon (CEO); Christa Vesy (CFO)
- Products: Shopping centers
- Revenue: ▼$661 million (2019)
- Net income: ▼ -$9 million (2019)
- Total assets: ▼$4.250 billion (2019)
- Total equity: ▼$906 million (2019)
- Number of employees: 845 (2019)
- Website: wpgus.com

Washington Prime Group Inc., doing business as wpg, is an American real estate investment trust that invests in shopping centers. The company is organized in Indiana with its headquarters in Columbus, Ohio. From January 2015 to September 2016, the company had the name WP Glimcher. On June 13, 2021, Washington Prime filed for Chapter 11 bankruptcy.

== Investments ==
As of July 2026, the company owned interests in 5 shopping centers.

Properties owned by the company include the following:

Property Name	Location
Boynton Beach Mall	Boynton Beach, Florida
Edison Mall	Fort Myers, Florida
Great Lakes Mall	Mentor, Ohio
Irving Mall	Irving, Texas
Jefferson Valley Mall	Yorktown Heights, New York

== History ==
On May 28, 2014, the company, which at that time owned interests in 98 shopping centers, was spun off by Simon Property Group.

In June 2014, the company acquired its partner's 50% interest in Clay Terrace for $22.9 million.

In January 2015, the company acquired Glimcher Realty Trust in a $4.3 billion transaction and the company was renamed as WP Glimcher. As part of the transaction, Jersey Gardens in Elizabeth, New Jersey and University Park Village in Fort Worth, Texas, were sold to Simon Property Group, while WP Glimcher acquired Brunswick Square in East Brunswick, New Jersey and Jefferson Valley Mall in Yorktown Heights, New York from Simon.

On June 20, 2016, CEO Michael P. Glimcher resigned from the company and Louis G. Conforti was named chief executive officer.

In September 2016, the company changed its name back to Washington Prime Group. The company also sold Knoxville Center for $10.15 million.

In May 2017, the company sold a stake in six mall properties for $340 million.

In June 2021, Washington Prime Group filed for bankruptcy.

As of 2025, Washington Prime Group is in the process of winding down operations, selling its remaining properties and laying off 139 employees, with the first layoffs beginning on June 2nd. The process is expected to be complete by May 31, 2026. CBRE assumed management of Washington Prime Group’s remaining properties sometime in 2026, with Washington Prime Group still owning the remaining properties.

== See also ==
- Rouse Properties, a similar company
