= Edens Plaza =

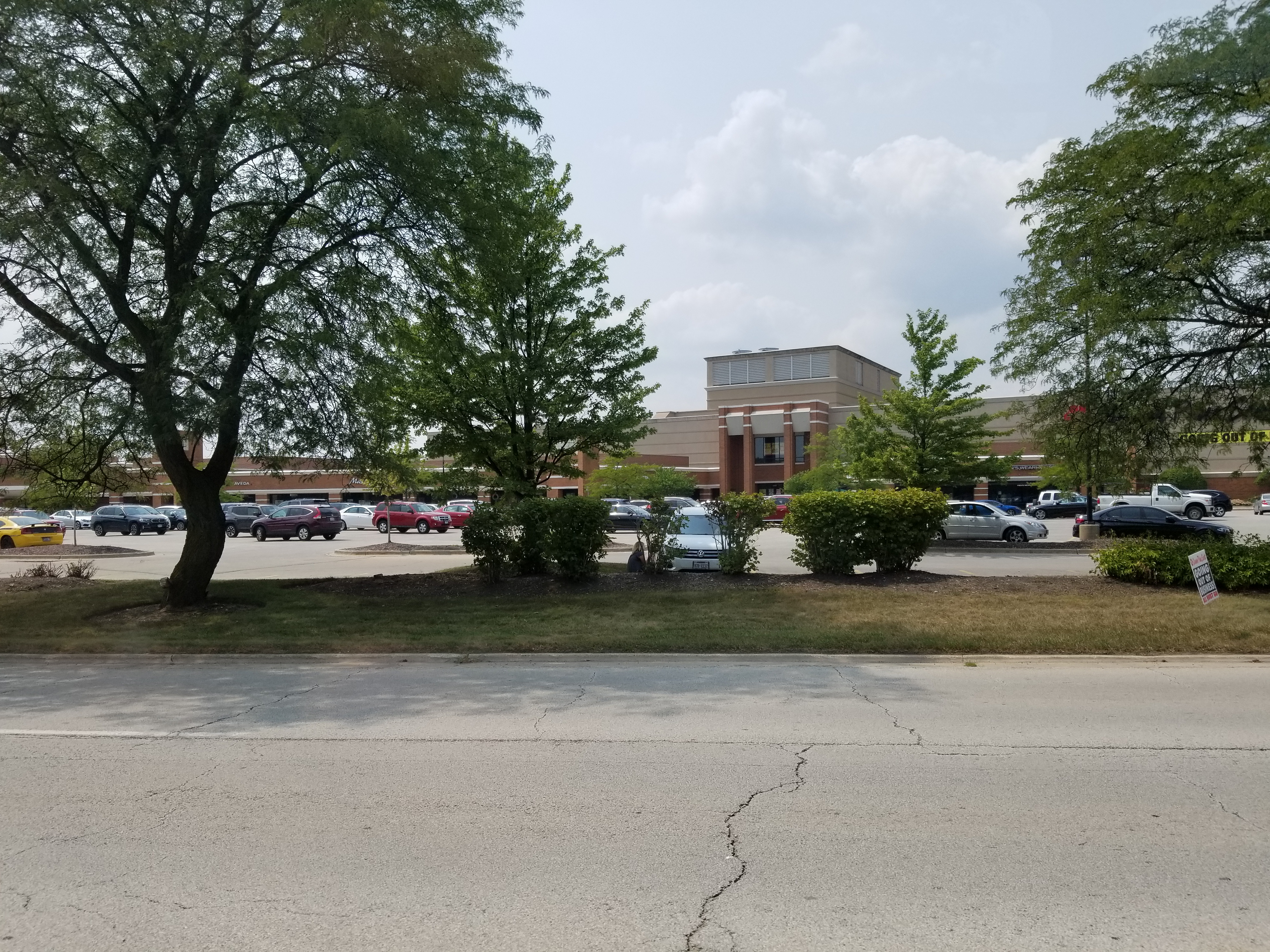
- Location: Wilmette, Illinois
- Coordinates: 42.081409°N 87.7565172°W
- Address: 3200 Lake Ave, Wilmette, IL 60091
- Opened: 1956; 70 years ago
- Developer: Carson Pirie Scott & Co. (original); Joseph Freed & Associates Inc. (redevelopment)
- Owner: Newport Capital Partners
- Architect: Welton Becket and Anderson Probst & White (original)
- Num. of stores: 23
- Num. of anchor tenants: 1 (Wayfair)
- Floor area: 342,858 sq ft (31,852.6 m^{2})
- Floors: 2
- Parking: 1,372
- Public transit: Pace #421 and #422

Edens Plaza is a strip mall in the town of Wilmette, Illinois. It was built by Carson Pirie Scott & Co. (Carson's) in 1956, and, until 2018, was anchored by one of their stores. It is located on a triangular parcel of land between Lake Avenue, Skokie Boulevard and the Edens Expressway.

Edens Plaza was one of the Chicago area's first regional shopping centers. After years of stalled efforts, the shopping center underwent a major reconstruction in the mid-1990s. Along with Harlem Irving Plaza and nearby Westfield Old Orchard (which both opened the same year as Edens Plaza), it is one of the Chicago area's oldest shopping malls. It is currently anchored by a Wayfair large concept store.

== History ==
=== Background ===
The Edens Expressway opened on December 20, 1951. Its construction accelerated the growth in the development of Chicago's northern suburbs. Suburban growth in the 1950s spurred a boom in the construction of shopping centers throughout the Chicago area.

The modern shopping mall did not come into fruition until the 1950s, following the 1950 opening of the Northgate Mall in Seattle. Thus, at the time which Edens Plaza first opened, modern shopping malls were a new phenomenon.

Before the 1950s, American shopping malls were still in a primitive state of their development. Early prototype shopping centers had been constructed in the United States. Wilmette's own Spanish Court (1928) was among these early shopping centers. Others included Cleveland Arcade (1890), Dayton Arcade (1902), Nashville Arcade (1902), City Market (1914), Lake View Store (1915), Peachtree Arcade (1917), Country Club Plaza (1923); Market Square (1923), Camayo Arcade (1926), Rhodes Center (1937), Spring Valley Shopping Center (1939), Briarcliff Plaza (1939), Shirlington Shopping Center (1944), Bellevue Square (1946), Broadway-Crenshaw Center (1947), Nob Hill Business Center (1947), Brentwood Country Mart (1948), Casas Adobes Plaza (1948), Cameron Village (1949) and Park Forest Plaza (1949).

=== Construction and opening ===
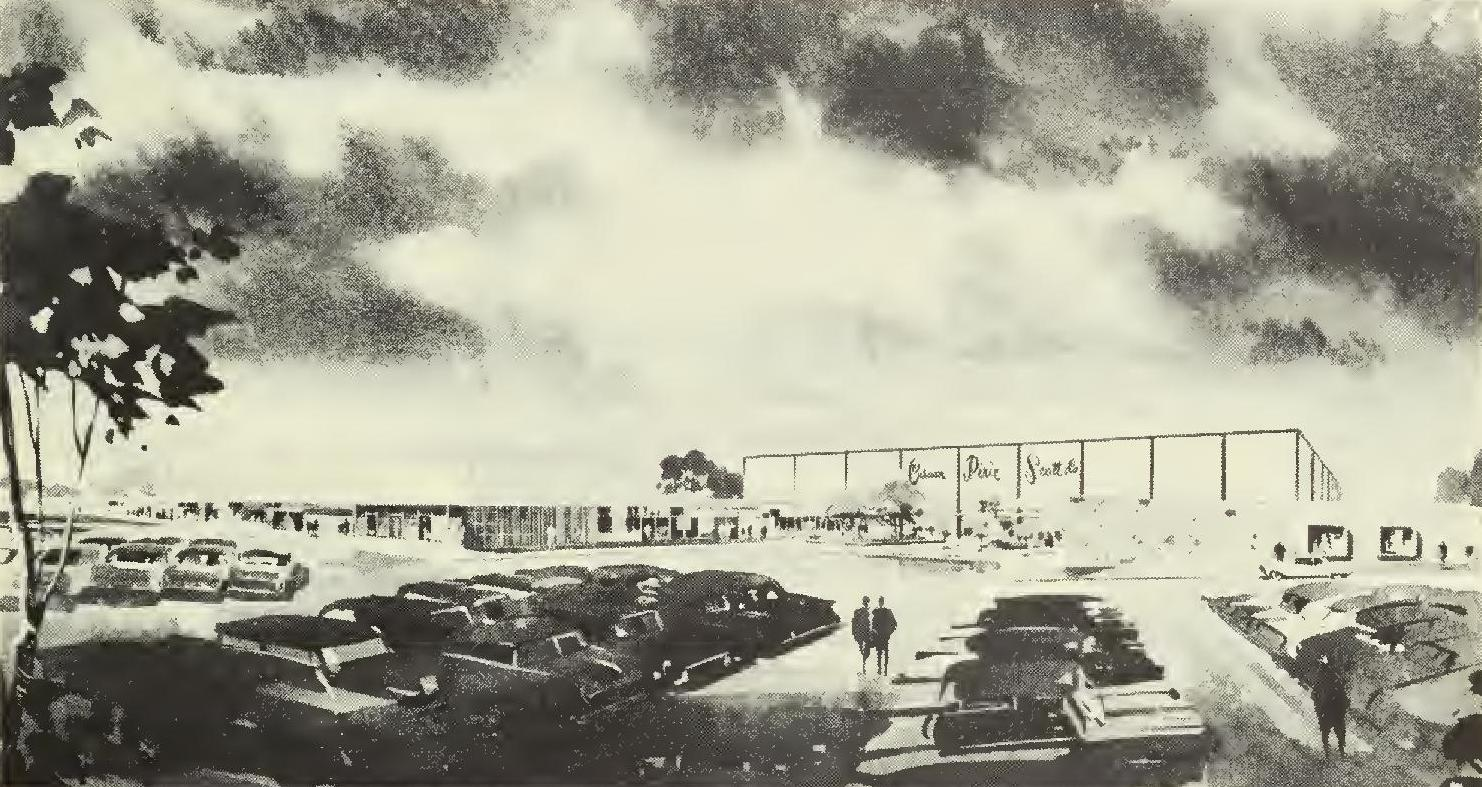
rendering of the original design

In the early 1950s, Carson Pirie Scott & Co noticed that suburban homemakers were making trips to their downtown location less and less frequently. Thus, they began constructing branch locations in the Chicago suburbs. First, Carson's constructed a 2-story 60,000 sq ft (5,600 m^{2}) location which opened in 1954, serving as the anchor tenant of Woodmar Mall in Hammond, Indiana. This was, in essence, proof-of-concept for the chain.

Carson's began planning to construct an outlet in the northern suburbs of Chicago after their internal studies showed $17 million in missing revenue to be found annually in the northern suburbs of Chicago. Carson's quietly acquired a 20-acre triangular tract of land located between the intersections of Lake Avenue, Skokie Boulevard and the (planned) Edens Expressway between the years of 1948 and 1953. The location was selected because of its accessibility to automobiles, and because of Wilmette's relative proximity to the communities of Arlington Heights, Deerfield, Evanston, Des Plaines, Glencoe, Glenview, Golf, Highwood, Kenilworth, Lake Forest, Morton Grove, Northbrook, Northfield, Skokie and Winnetka.

This was the first shopping center entirely owned by Carson's. They chose to construct a shopping center, and not a stand-alone store, partially in an effort to compete with Marshall Field's. Marshall Fields was a partner in the construction of a shopping center of their own, located only a mile south of Edens Plaza along both Skokie Boulevard and the Edens Expressway. This was Old Orchard in the neighboring suburb of Skokie. It opened the same year as Edens Plaza with a 300,000 sq ft (28,000 m^{2}) Marshall Field's department store and retail space for 64 additional tenants.

The shopping center was named for its location along the Edens Expressway.

On May 5, 1953, Carson Pirie Scott announced their plans to construct a department store and retail center on the triangular tract of land they had acquired in Wilmette. The site was zoned residential. Therefore, on May 19, Carson's appealed to the Village of Wilmette for the site to be rezoning, allowing them to construct a "community shopping center.” Carson's chairman Bruce MacLeish argued that the site would never prove ideal for residential development due to traffic from the three bordering thoroughfares. Some Wilmette residents agreed that it made sense for the site to be zoned commercial by virtue of its location at the intersections of three arterial roadways. Many who supported the proposal believed that the tax revenues generated would lessen the burden placed on the rest of the village's property owners.

The proposed retail center was met by opposition from residents of the nearby 'Indian Hills' sub-division. They pointed-out that the rezoning would extend commercial operations along Skokie Boulevard, consequentially bringing traffic and congestion to the area. They argued that this could allow traffic to encroach upon their neighborhood's quiet streets, thus creating a hazard for their children, and would also decrease the property value of their residences. Those opposing the project additionally argued that it violated the spirit village's zoning ordinance and comprehensive plan, which intended to keep the character of the village primarily a single-family suburb, with retail limited to the extent that serves the population's immediate demand. Carson's, however, projected that their shopping center would not have a negative impact on existing local commerce, pointing to a survey that had determined the annual retail potential of Wilmette to be $27 million, which provided ample room for additional commerce to be added upon the village's existing $15 million in annual commerce. McLeish promised that he would build the best planned and most modern retail center in the nation, and displayed a scale-model of his plans. McLeish claimed that the planned structures would occupy only 20% of the site's land, thus would not be overdeveloped.

Just as Carson's was preparing to abandon their plans, the Wilmette Village Board granted approval to the project on February 17, 1954.

The design for Edens Plaza was created by the firm Anderson, Probst & White in collaboration with Welton Becket. Edens Plaza predated other Welton Beckett-designed malls, such as Christown Spectrum Mall (1961), Walt Whitman Shops (1962), Park Plaza Mall (1970) and Worcester Center Galleria (1971). Its architectural design is reflective of Anderson, Probst & White's post-war abandonment of their previously trademark neoclassic style.

Edens Plaza cost 2.5 million dollars to construct. It consisted of a Carson's department store with an attached retail structure housing 24 stores, totaling a gross retail space of 210,000 square feet (20,000 m^{2}). The top of the buildings were adorned by bright salt-and-pepper glazed bricks trimmed by black bricks. The lower portions of the building were clad with warmer colored stone. There was a 10 sq ft (0.93 m^{2}) canopy on the sides of the a courtyard at the main entrance of the Carson's, providing shoppers with a covered walkway. The two-story 118,000 sq ft (11,000 m^{2}) Carson's department store served as Edens Plaza's anchor store.

The Carson's was the chain's fourth suburban location. At the time it opened on May 19, 1956, the Carson's was one of the largest department stores in the Chicago area outside of the Loop. It contained 100 departments, including every department featured in the chain's downtown location, with the exception of the basement department (as the Wilmette location lacked a basement). Counters within the store were designed in a manner to make them easily movable, thus providing flexibility that would allow the store to be more easily readjusted. The store was designed to allow the addition of a third-story. The store had five separate entrances, allowing customers to easily access it from any part of the shopping center's 648,000 sq ft (60,200 m^{2}) 1,700-car parking lot. The main eastern entrance fronted a large planted flagstone courtyard. To the left of this entrance was a section of the store themed to Alice in Wonderland, which was meant to appeal to the children in the young suburbanite families which Carson's sought as clientele. There was an outdoor sales area located in the exterior arcade on the west side of the courtyard where patio, picnic, lawn and gardening products were displayed. The store contained an eatery named 'The Buffet'.

By February 1956, leases had been signed for ten of Edens Plaza's 24 retail spaces. Carson's opened May 19, 1956 and the entire shopping center opened later that summer in a ceremony officiated by the Edens Expressway's namesake, William G. Eden.

=== Subsequent history ===
At the time it opened, the area surrounding Edens Plaza was largely undeveloped. By the end of the 1956, Edens Plaza and Old Orchard's impact along the stretch of Skokie Boulevard running between them was evidenced with the opening of a Fannie May retail location along that section of Skokie Boulevard. In its first years, a lack of frequent public transit routes serving the shopping center proved to be an impediment to finding workers to fill job vacancies at Edens Plaza's stores. In 1957 American Coach company volunteered to operate a service at the shopping center, and Edens Plaza's management applied for approval from the Illinois Commerce Commission to operate such a bus service.

Building upon the experience they gained in constructing Edens Plaza, Carson's began planning the construction of a far more ambitious mall (Randhurst Mall) two years after opening Edens Plaza.

The Carson Pirie Scott at Edens Plaza was, for the next three decades, one of the chain's most profitable locations, and served as one of the chain's flagship locations. The store was enlarged and renovated in a $600,000 remodel in 1966, which included the construction of a glass entrance rotunda. Additionally, in the 1960s, Edens Plaza was expanded with the addition of strip stores in its parking lot. This included the construction of a 25,000 sq ft (2,300 m^{2}) structure on the property's northern end, which would subsequently serve as the longtime site of a JoS. A. Bank Clothiers location. ‘’Edens Plaza Bank’’ was chartered in March 1971 and opened as a drive-through bank in Edens Plaza that June. Collectively, these expansions brought center's cumulative retail space to 294,000 sq ft (27,300 m^{2}) . In 1966 an office tower was constructed across Skokie Boulevard from Edens Plaza.

In 1974, Westlake Plaza, a 42,216 sq ft (3,922.0 m^{2}) retail center, was constructed across Lake Avenue from Edens Plaza.

=== Failed efforts to redevelop Edens Plaza ===
By the mid-1980's, the once-vibrant shopping center had become a dated relic. Edens Plaza was not unique in its need for a revitalization. Several other suburban retail centers built around the same time as Edens Plaza underwent refurbishment in the 1980s and 1990s, including Seven Corners Shopping Center and Randhurst Mall.

Due to increased competition from shopping centers in the region, Carson's started exploring their options. They even considered moving their department store to Old Orchard and shuttering Edens Plaza. The Edens Plaza site, however, was a key location. On a daily basis, more than 100,000 cars passed it on the Edens Expressway, with an additional 25,000 each on Lake Avenue and Skokie Boulevard. More than 350,000 people lived within a fifteen-minute drive of Edens Plaza, and nearly a million people lived within a twenty-minute drive. Thus, Carson's ultimately decided to stay at Edens Plaza, concluding that the retail center would need to be updated and refurbished.

At the time, Wilmette's zoning ordinances gave Carson Pirie Scott a wide variety of options for redevelopment. The site had 66 different permitted uses, with retail and offices as parking structures, theaters, and even heliports all being permitted. The zoning ordinances that were in-place at the time would have allowed nearly 1,000,000 square feet (93,000 m^{2}) of office space to be constructed on the site of Edens Plaza.

==== Edens Pavilion (1987) ====
In June 1987, after signing a letter of intent to purchase the Edens Plaza from Carson Pirie Scott & Co., Ken Tucker (the developer of Chicago Ridge Mall) put forth a $134 million redevelopment proposal that would have seen all of Edens Plaza razed and replaced by a 700,000 sq ft (65,000 m^{2}) three-level indoor shopping mall named Edens Pavilion. Edens Pavilion would have been the first new regional mall to be built in Chicago's northern suburbs since Northbrook Court opened in 1976. Edens Pavilion would have had a sky-lit interior. It would have housed 100 stores, and would have included a new 250,000 sq ft (23,000 m^{2}) Carson Pirie Scott store, a second department store occupying a 200,000 sq ft (19,000 m^{2}) space, as well as a four-screen 2,000-seat multiplex. A nine-story 250-room hotel would be constructed at the north-end of the property. 3,400 parking spaces were to be provided by two planned parking garages, with an additional 284 spaces provided by surface lots. Tucker's company claimed that Edens Pavilion would generate $2.5 million in annual tax revenue for the village, more than double the $600,000 that Edens Plaza was generating at the time. However, Tucker requested that $15 million in public funding be provided to assist in covering the costs of the project, with the likely form of such funding being through the use of tax increment financing.

Tucker had originally intended to close on the purchase of Edens Plaza by the fall of 1987. His initial timetable for construction had been to finish construction on the first of the two planned parking structures before July 1988, open the new Carson Pirie Scott location by March 1990, demolish the existing Carson's location before the end of Spring 1990, finish construction on the second parking structure and the majority of the mall before October 1991. Soon after finishing construction on the mall, he planned to start construction on the hotel, which would open in late 1992.

The Edens Pavilion plan was met with vocal opposition from nearby residents. Much of criticism concerned the project’s enormity. Residents also expressed disapproval towards the extended hours of operation that the hotel and movie theater would require. The appearance of the proposed mall was also a point of criticism, with residents complaining of its, “Disneyland architecture”. Other concerns included the fear that a large mall would attract, “undesirables” to the area. A group of residents formed the Edens Plaza Concerned Citizens group to oppose the project. Due both to the local opposition and his failure to secure tax increment financing, Tucker ultimately lost interest in the project and officially withdrew his plans in October 1987.

==== Edens Plaza Associates plan (1989) ====
In January 1989, Carson Pirie Scott unveiled a $100 million plan by Edens Plaza Associates (a consortium of partners consisting of Henry A. Lay & Associates, Joseph Freed & Associates Inc. and the Edward J. DeBartolo Corp.) to transform Edens Plaza into a three-story 786,000 sq ft (73,000 m^{2}) indoor regional mall containing 637,000 square feet (59,200 m^{2}) of leasable area. The plan did not include a movie theater or an office tower. The plan would see Edens Plaza Associates acquire the shopping center through a sale-leaseback arrangement with Carson's. Edens Plaza Associates expected for the village to help finance the project by providing them $27 million in subsidies to be provided by the issuing of a $10 million note funded by tax incremental financing bonds, with the rest of the subsidies to be paid by a 10% annual interest. The consortium claimed that over the next quarter-century the mall was going to generate between $60 and $100 million in tax revenue for the village.

As part of the Edens Plaza Associate's plan, the existing Carson Pirie Scott department store was to be remodeled and strip stores were to be demolished. The remolded Edens Plaza mall was to contain restaurants, nearly 100 stores, a food court, a multiplex, and a new 150,000 sq ft (14,000 m^{2}) second anchor store. A four-story 2,750-car parking garage would be built on the western edge of the property, and a 185,000 square-foot office tower would be built at the north end of the property. The proposal was not impacted by the sale of the Carson's chain to P.A. Bergner's & Co. in May of that year. However, the plan was criticized for its size. Traffic was also a concern.

In October 1989, Edens Plaza Associates put forth revised plans, decreasing the size of the proposed mall to 730,000 square feet (68,000 square metres), with 590,000 square feet (55,000 square metres) of leasable area. The revision also reduced the parking garage's height to three-stories. Additional landscaping was included in the revised plans, which would have seen four acres of open space created. To alleviate the traffic impact, the revision had larger the entrances and exits to the complex than the previous renovation plan had, and also planned to widen both Lake Avenue and Skokie Boulevard to create additional turning lanes.

Despite protest from residents and a negative review from the Zoning Board of Appeals, the Wilmette Village Board voted 5–1 to grant conditional approval to the revised plans in December 1989. The village drafted a financial assistance plan, which would be subject to final approval process upon the zoning board approval of the project. facilitate the planned redevelopment, and to provide Edens Plaza with specialized zoning the Village created a PCD (Planned Commercial Development) zone, referred as PCD-1, which encompasses the entirety of the shopping center's site. In early 1990, the village granted final approval to the redevelopment. By this time, the planned mall had been given the name Edens Center, and was now slated to be 750,000 square feet (70,000 square metres) and contain 583,000 square feet (54,200 square metres) of retail space. Final designs called for the mall to be very compact, with its central interior concourse to be only 550 in length. The promenade would be heavily skylit and feature pattern-cast terrazzo tile floors and landscape elements. A quietly cascading water feature and glass elevator were to serve as the mall's central features. Ornamentation in the malls decor was to feature elements inspired by Frank Lloyd Wright's prairie style of architecture. The mall's exterior was to be clad with brick and metal, and would be surrounded by landscaping. Carson's was to receive a $30 million renovation that would also increase its floorspace to 200,000 square feet (19,000 m^{2}). A 110,000 sq ft (10,000 m^{2}) Sears location had been announced as the development's second anchor. A food court would be located at the northern end of the mall adjacent to the Sears. The mall was slated to be managed by Forest City Development, and was scheduled to open in the Fall of 1992.

In preparation for the redevelopment, tenants were evicted from retail spaces at Edens Plaza. Additionally, in anticipation of the reconstruction, ‘’Edens Plaza Bank’’ vacated their location at Edens Plaza, constructing a new facility across Lake Avenue at the former site of a car wash. The development never followed this. Edens Plaza Associates encountered difficulties in securing financing. In the fall of 1990, the project's team was in the process of finalizing agreements that would have seen investors and borrowers provide $95 million to fund the construction. However, the Gulf War spurred a period of global financial insecurity causing the early 1990s recession, which caused the project's financial backing to recede. The development's prospects were further damaged by the August 1991 bankruptcy of Carson's parent company P.A. Bergner & Co. The plans were additionally complicated in late-December 1991, when Skokie granted approval for Old Orchard to construct an expansion that would add 500,000 square feet (46,000 square metres) of retail space. A large mall at Edens Plaza would have had to directly compete with a newly expanded Old Orchard.

=== Renovation of Edens Plaza ===
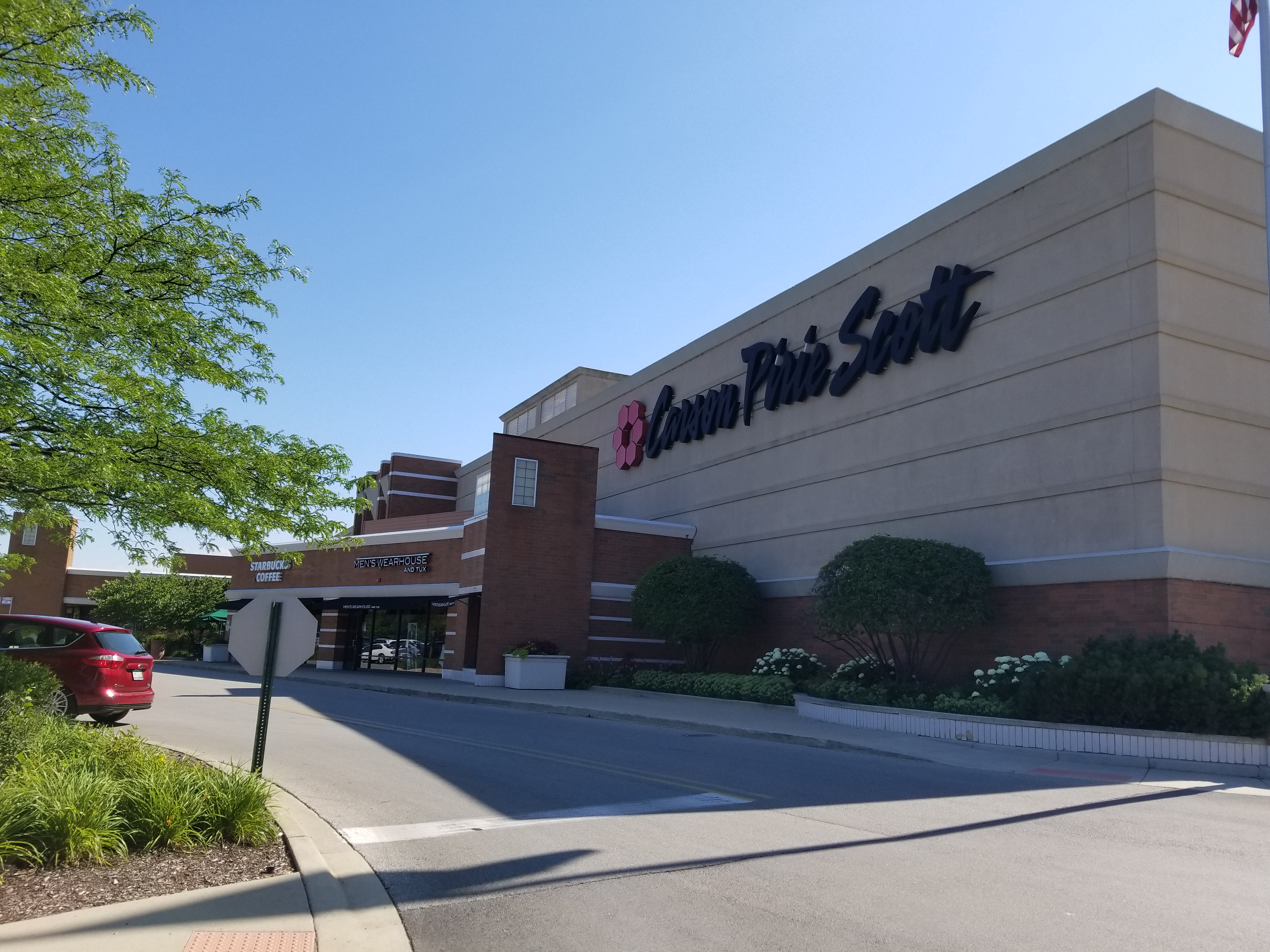
a portion of the Carson's structure, photographed in 2018

After Edens Plaza Associate's plans fizzled, the village government decided to take the opportunity to reassess the property's zoning regulations. This led to Wilmette amending its zoning ordinance on May 5, 1992. The adopted amendment required the site to redeveloped a shopping center, as the village determined that retail would generate the greatest amount of tax revenue from the site. The village limited the site's permitted amount of retail space to 344,000 square feet (32,000 square metres). This was about half of what had been permitted for the property in the 1975 and 1990 zoning ordinances. In addition, up to 70,000 square feet (6,500 square metres) of office space would be permitted. However, in order to guarantee that retail would remain a key component of any redevelopment, the amendment specified that office space would not be permitted on the ground-floors of buildings.

In December 1992, a development team that Carson's ownership had selected to redevelop the site informed the village of its intentions to present a new plan for redevelopment in the coming year. However, in 1993, Joseph Freed & Associates Inc. (a developer which today owns the 108 North State Street project) partnered with Antonia Investments to purchase Edens Plaza. Joseph Freed & Associates had been a partner in previous the Edens Plaza Associates plan. The sale was finalized in April 1994. In the sale, Carson's retained possession of their location at Edens Plaza, but forfeited their ownership of the rest of the Edens Plaza complex. Joseph Freed & Associates planned to undertake significantly more modest renovation of the Edens Plaza than had been previously planned. They believed the existing center had outlived its shelf-life and needed to be redeveloped. However, they did not consider acquiring Edens Plaza to be a risky endeavor, as they felt it was situated in a prime-location.

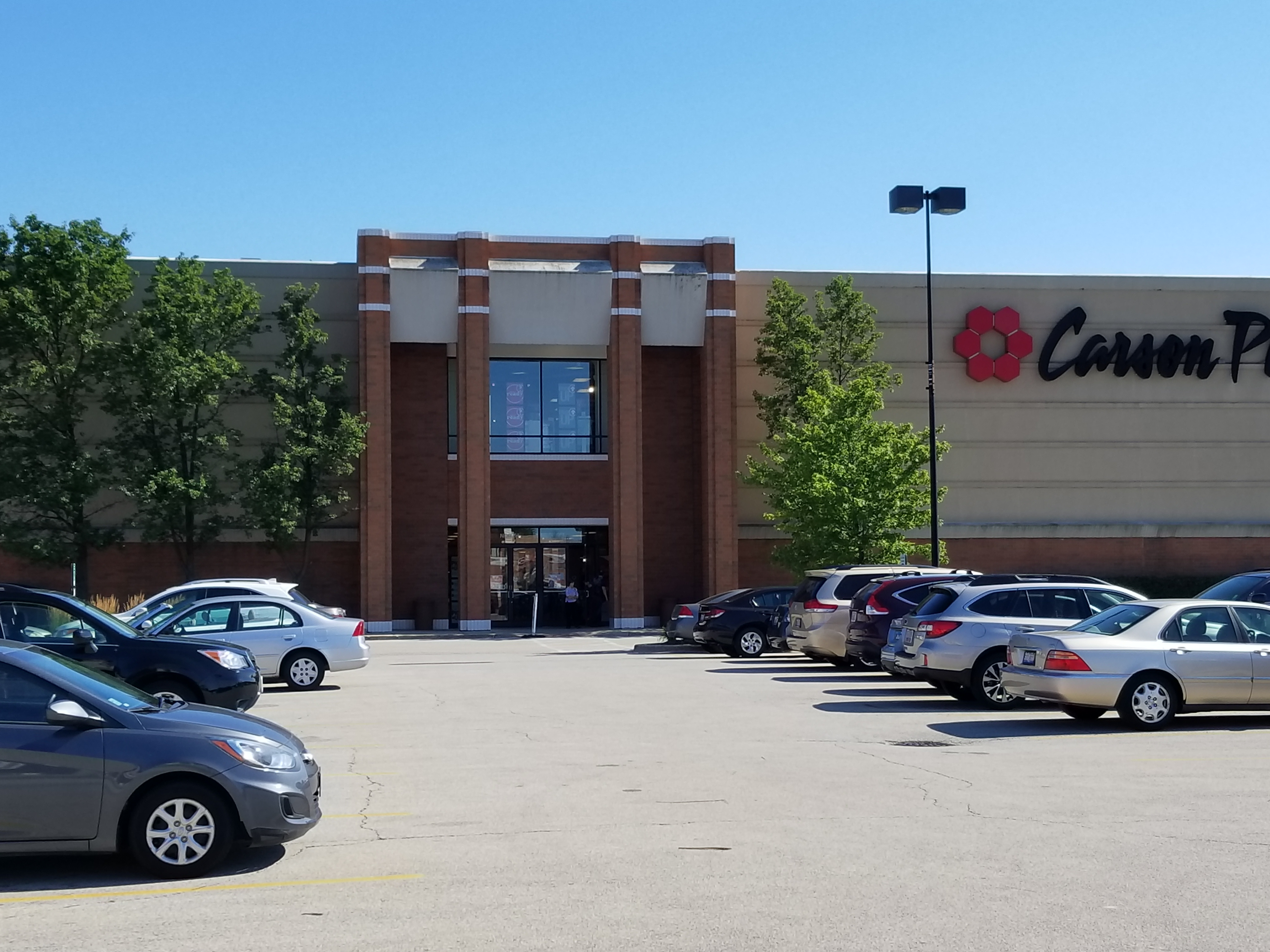
2017 photograph of the exterior of Carson's

By the time Joseph Freed & Associates acquired Edens Plaza, the shopping center, apart from Carson's and JoS. A. Bank, was virtually abandoned. The shopping center had become little more than a deteriorating row of vacant storefronts. Chuck Fioritowas, the vice president of development at Joseph Freed, had determined there was no viable way to reformat the layout of existing retail structures. Thus, with the exception of the Carson's department store, all existing structures at Eden's Plaza would need to be demolished and replaced. Joseph Freed & Associates put forth plans redevelop the plaza in 1993. They would demolish the entire shopping center, apart from Carson's, and construct three new buildings. The new buildings would be a 70,000 sq ft (6,500 m^{2}) structure on the northern end of the property, a 96,000 sq ft (8,900 m^{2}) structure on the southern end (which would adjoin the Carson's building) and a smaller building located between northern building and Carson's. The plan would result in a 316,000 sq ft (29,400 m^{2}) shopping plaza. By tearing-down the original retail, Joseph Freed were able to reorient the storefronts of the shopping center's north end towards the Edens Expressway and the storefronts of its south end towards Skokie Boulevard, thus increasing their visibility.

In December 1993, the Wilmette Zoning Board approved the project and the Wilmette Village Board voted unanimously to approve Joseph Freed & Associate's plans. Demolition work began in April 1994. Jos. A. Bank vacated their Edens Plaza location by the end of May, ahead of the demolition of its building. Renovations of Edens Plaza took place between 1994 and 1995 and cost $42 million. The majority of the work was completed by the end of 1994.

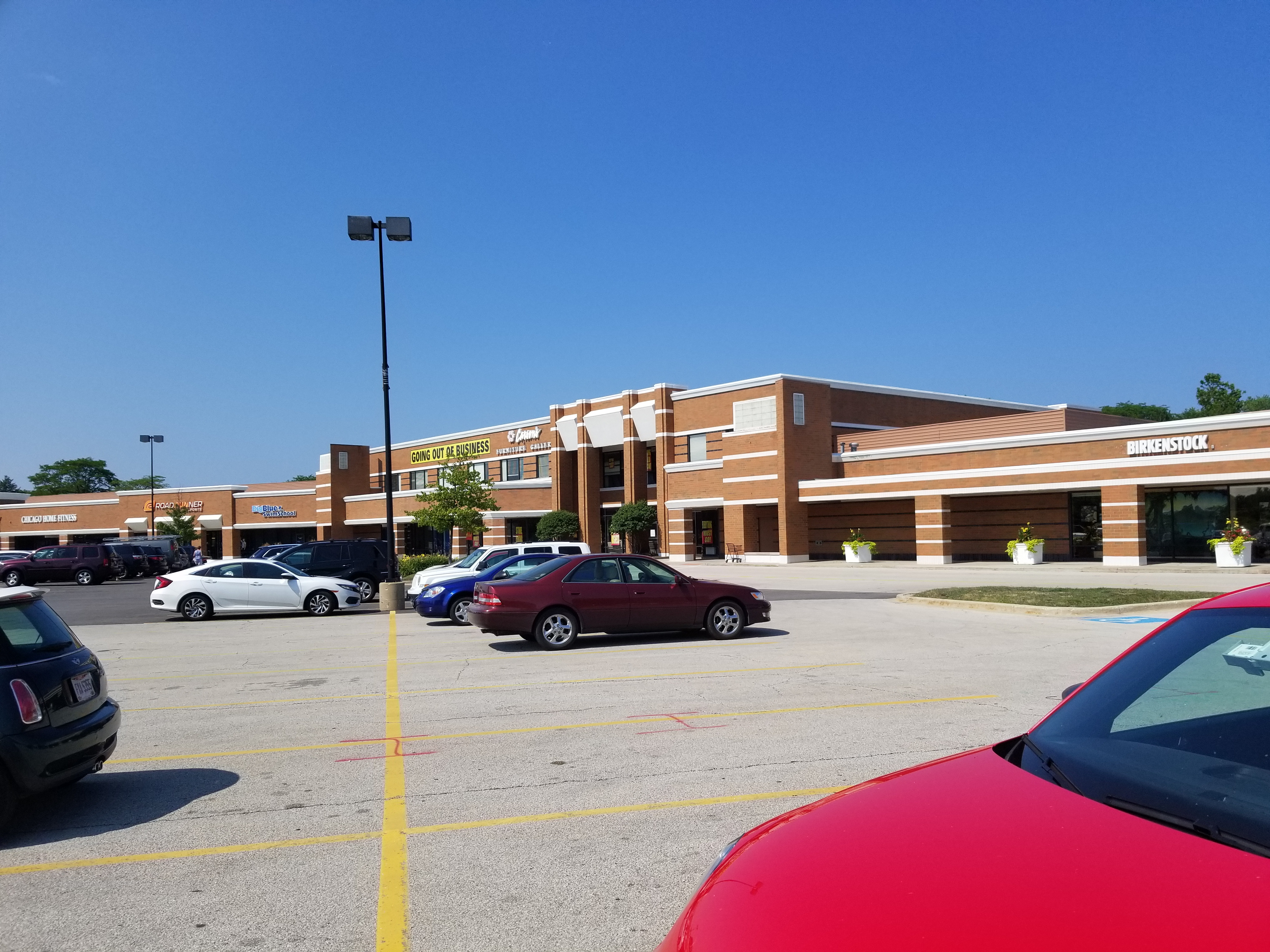
2018 photograph of the exterior of the standalone furniture gallery

Independently, Carson's renovated their location at Edens Plaza, as part of a cumulatively $40 million program to renovate a number of their locations. The renovations at the Carson’s were more extensive than those of any of the eight Carson’s locations that were being renovated at the time. Work took two years, and involved both gutting its interiors and reconstructing the exterior shell of the building. Complicating the construction was the fact that the store remained opened during its renovation. In the process, the store’s square footage was downsized to 160,000 square feet (15,000 square metres). However, Carson’s leased a two-story 35,000 sq ft (3,300 m^{2}) retail space in the structure on the northern end of the property to house a stand-alone furniture gallery. This spun-off the store’s furniture department into its own outlet, and was the first freestanding furniture store to be operated by the chain.

Rather than a generic power center, the refurbished Edens Plaza aimed to be more of a hybrid shopping center, an upscale open-air retail complex anchored by a department store. Joseph Freed & Associates had believed that Edens Plaza's past shortcomings had stemmed from their inability to land tenants that would act as sub-anchors. Thus, in redeveloping the mall, they attracted big-box stores and category killers such as Bed Bath & Beyond, Borders, Pet Care Superstore, United Audio Center and the aforementioned Carsons Furniture Gallery to serve that function. Other major stores that they attracted for the center's reopening included Men's Wearhouse and Noodle Kidoodle. The center was fully leased ahead of its re-opening.

The redevelopment was a finalist in the category for Retail Development of the Year at the 1995 NAIOP Awards for Excellence.

=== Recent history ===
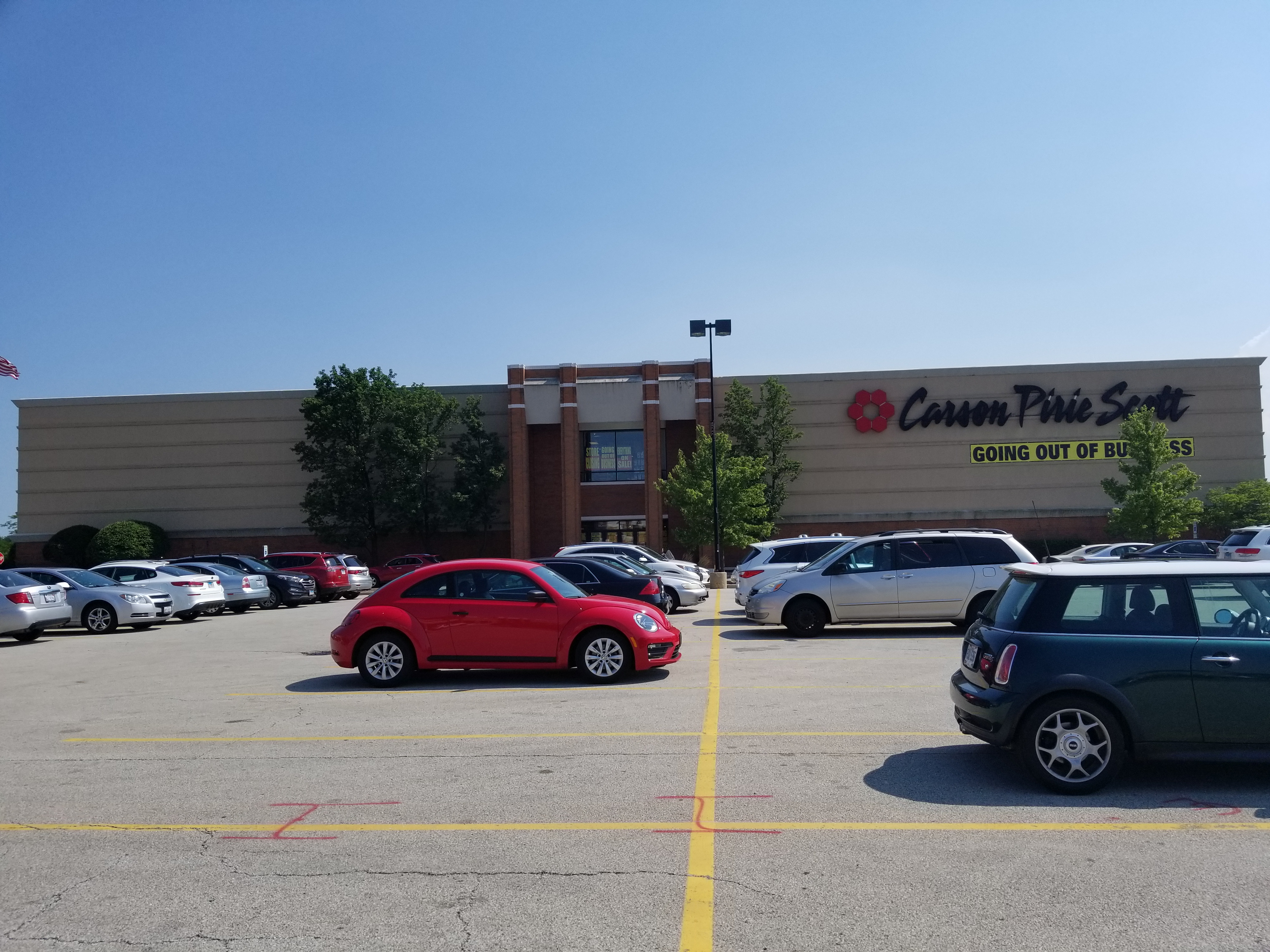
exterior of the Carson's during its "going out of business" sale

In 2005 Edens Plaza failed to receive approval from the village of Wilmette to construct a new two-story retail building and a parking structure. However, these plans stalled. In early 2016 two one-story additions were approved for construction north of Carson's at Edens Plaza. These additions would have added 14,727 square feet (1,368.2 m^{2}) of retail to the complex. While these new additions would eliminate a portion of the parking lot, even with the added square footage of retail space that would be created, Edens Plaza would still have had excess parking spaces compared to the legal requirement. These additions have yet to be constructed.

As of 2011, a populace of 284,478 people lived within a radius of 5 miles (8.0 km) of Edens Plaza. As of 2020, 110,000 people lived within a radius of 3 miles (4.8 km) of Edens Plaza, with households in that radius having an average annual household income of $182,250. Edens Plaza is Wilmette's largest taxpayer. As of 2014, Edens Plaza was estimated to generate 1.5% of the village's property tax and 25% of its sales tax. In 2017, the shopping center had no vacant retail locations. In January 2019, it was 92% leased.

Carson's closed after parent company Bon-Ton went bankrupt.

In September 2018, the Wilmette Village Board granted approval for a pediatric health center operated by NorthShore University HealthSystem and Advocate Health Care to be created in the two-story 35,000 sq ft (3,300 m^{2}) space previously occupied by the Carson's Furniture Gallery. It opened in November 2019.

In January 2019, the shopping center was sold for $72 million to a firm owned by Newport Capital Partners. In March 2019, Newport Capital Partners purchased the former Carson's space for $14 million, placing the entire Edens Plaza under single ownership for the first time in decades. In January 2020, Edens Plazas's new owners, Newport Capital Partners, purchased Westlake Plaza, the neighborhood center across Lake Avenue from Edens Plaza.

In April 2019, the Village of Wilmette approved safety improvements to the intersection of Skokie Boulevard and Lake Avenue.

In early 2024, Wayfair opened its first large concept store in the former Carson's.

== Notable events ==
- In February 1957 Joseph “Pops” Panczko, a member of the Hole in the Wall Gang, was arrested for his involvement in a jewelry robbery at Edens Plaza. Believing him to have a gun in his hand, a police officer shot at him in the Edens Plaza parking lot, wounding him six times as he tried fleeing the scene. Panczko survived the incident.

== See also ==
- Westfield Old Orchard – a nearby shopping center
- Plaza del Lago – Another shopping center in Wilmette
