= Orland Park Place =

Shopping center in Illinois, United States

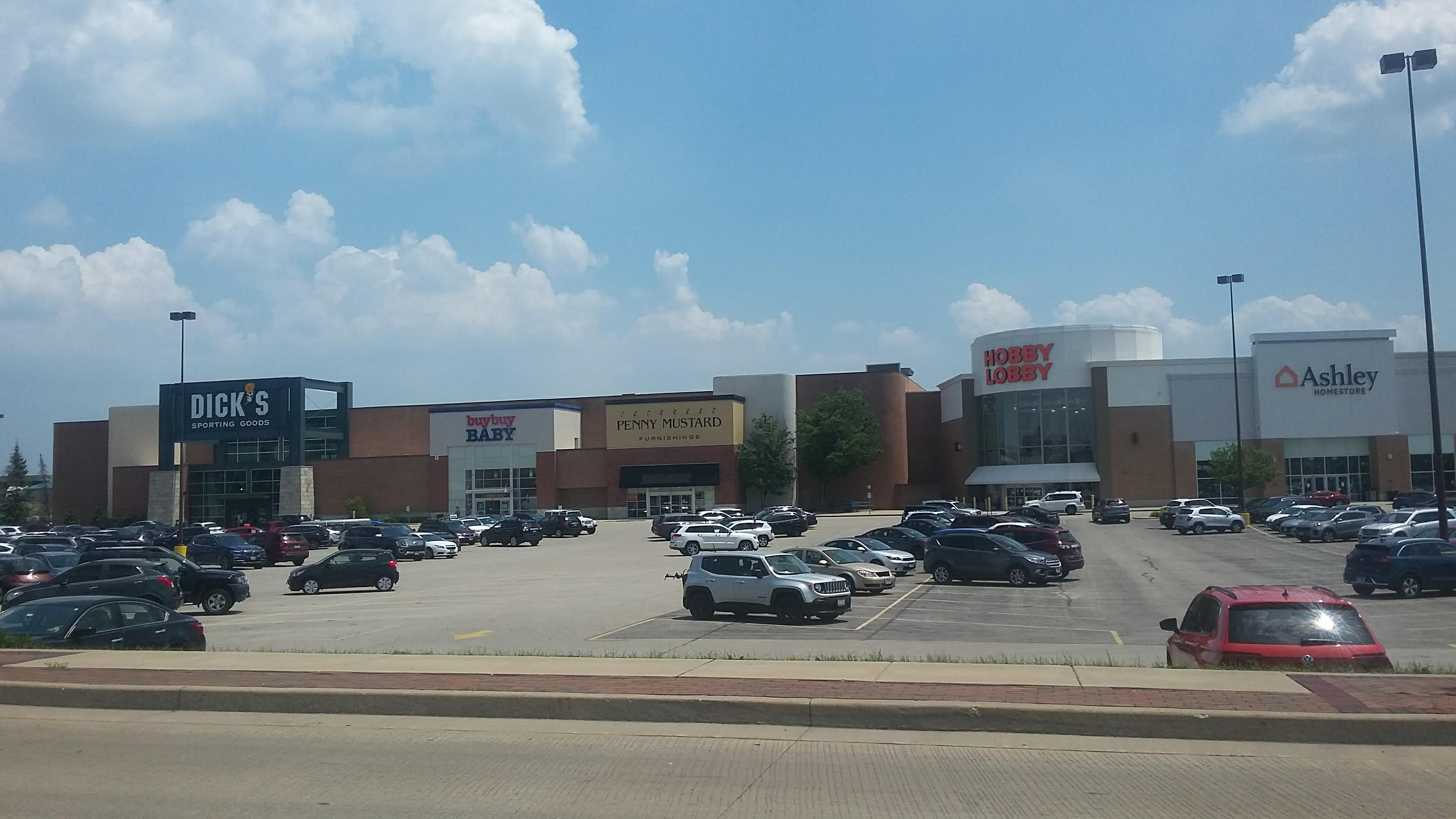
- Location: Orland Park, Illinois, United States
- Coordinates: 41.61231640°N 87.85189330°W
- Address: 49 Orland Park Place
- Opened: May, 1981
- Closed: 1997 (as enclosed mall)
- Previous names: Orland Court
- Developer: American Income Properties
- Owner: Pine Tree, LLC
- Num. of stores: 50+
- Num. of anchor tenants: 10+
- Floor area: 598,555 square feet (55,607.6 m^{2})
- Floors: 2
- Public transit: Pace

Orland Park Place, formerly Orland Court, is a shopping center in Orland Park, Illinois, a suburb of Chicago, Illinois, United States. Built in 1981 and 1982, as an enclosed shopping mall, it was largely unsuccessful on this front, and was redeveloped into a largely outdoor mall in 1999. The mall is owned and managed by Pine Tree LLC.

== History ==
Orland Court, initially Orland Greens, was first announced in July 1979, developed by American Income Properties with anchors to include Montgomery Ward and Wieboldt's. Montgomery Ward would open ahead of the mall on March 19, 1981. Wieboldt's would open on August 13, 1981, with AIP previewing the mall for local business people and government officials at this same time. Additional mall stores were set to open in the spring, and a Phase 2 of the mall was also announced, to include 2 more anchors, one of which was to be Bergner-Weise, a Peoria, Illinois based department store. In November 1981, lender BA Mortgage filed a lawsuit against AIP, seeking foreclosure of Orland Court due to the developer owing a combined $24.5 million in interest and principal on a $20 million loan taken out to build the property. AIP filed for bankruptcy on May 21, 1982, and the property was eventually awarded to lenders Equitable Life Assurance Society of the US, BA Mortgage, and Mercantile Bank of Canada.

Chicago-based developer Spatz & Co purchased the property in late 1984, for an undisclosed amount, though stated to be less than $24 million. A $20 million renovation was announced at this time, to include 3 more anchors and a 300-seat food court. MainStreet and a Spiegel Outlet were announced as new anchors in April 1985, followed by Sportmart later that year. It was at this time the property would be renamed to Orland Park Place, inspired by the Monopoly property of the same name, as suggested by Bill Spatz' wife. MainStreet would be the first of the new anchors to open, on November 21, 1985.

=== Decline ===
Wieboldt's would be the first anchor to close its doors on March 20, 1987. Heller Financial would seek to foreclose on a $39.5 million loan taken out by William Spatz to renovate and purchase the mall in 1989, eventually taking ownership of the mall. Heller would eventually bring in Tri-Land Properties to manage the mall, and would in 1993 announce plans to redevelop the mall as an off-price center, with suggested tenants such as Nordstrom Rack, TJ Maxx, and Filene's Basement. In 1994, Tri-Land would seek to make the property a tax increment financing district, saying that without it, the mall would close in two years. In 1995, Sportmart announced that they would be building a new store to replace the Orland Park Place location, citing the mall location's small size. At this time, the mall was more than 80% vacant, with Hugh Robinson, Vice-President of Tri-Land Properties, saying that "Orland Park Place is a ship with a lot of holes in it. ... I don't know how much longer it will stay afloat". By this time, two proposals to convert the mall to an off-price center had been shot down, with the second proposal publicly rejected by Mayor Dan McLaughlin. Heller Financial would sell the property outright to Tri-Land in 1995, however by 1996 they would be involved in litigation with the First Lien Company, which was attempting to gain ownership of the property. In 1996, the mall had fallen even further, with an occupancy rate under 10%, and with Kohl's having closed both of their mall entrances.

The mall would close for good in April 1997, leaving the only open stores to be Montgomery Ward, Kohl's, and Sportmart, the latter of which was set to close following the completion of a replacement store.

=== Redevelopment ===
The mall would be purchased by Hiffman Shaffer Associates in 1998, who planned to redevelop the mall as an open air shopping center. The revamped center would have its grand opening in November 1999, with major tenants including Barnes & Noble, DSW Shoe Warehouse, an expanded Sportmart, Bed Bath & Beyond, and Cost Plus. Further tenants would open in 2000, including Wickes Furniture, Stein Mart, and Old Navy. Montgomery Ward would close in March 2001 after the chain filed for bankruptcy, with Galyan's and Office Depot announced to take over the property in 2002. HSA would put the property up for sale in October 2003, and announce a buyer for the property in 2005, though it was not named.

Galyan's would be converted to a Dick's Sporting Goods in 2004, following the chain's acquisition. Nordstrom Rack would open at the mall in 2008, then owned by Inland Real Estate Corporation. 2011 would see the opening of both HHGregg on September 15, and Ross on October 8. Office Depot would close on December 12, 2012, in anticipation of a relocation to a smaller store. Sports Authority, who had taken over long time tenant Sportmart in 2003, would close amidst bankruptcy in 2016. HHGregg would close in 2017, with the space split between an Ashley Furniture HomeStore that opened on July 21, 2018, and a Hobby Lobby which opened on March 4, 2019.

Bed Bath & Beyond closed in September 2020, followed by Stein Mart a month later in October. Steinhafels opened on November 25, 2024.
