= Randhurst Village =

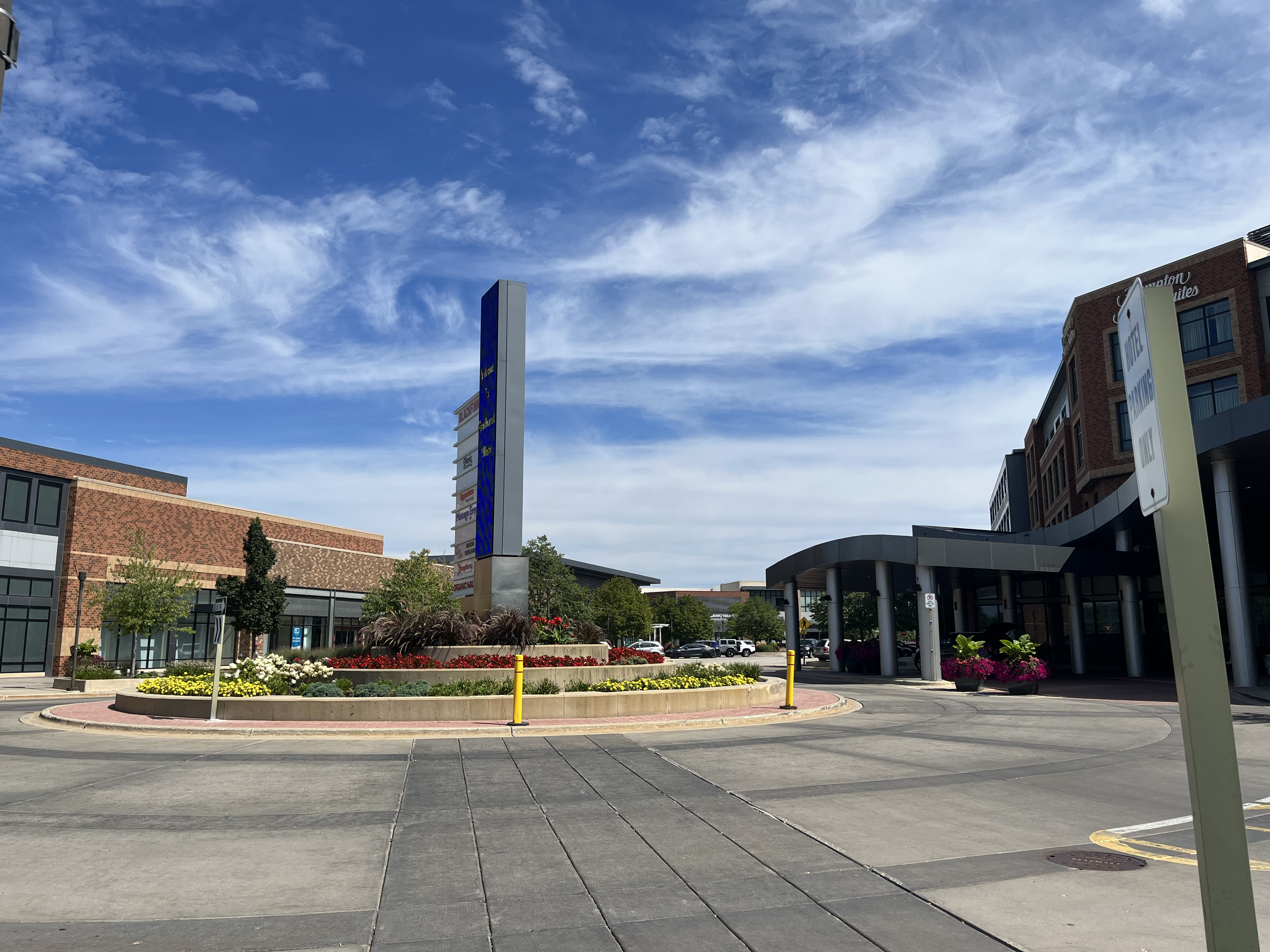
- Randhurst's Center Court
- Location: Mount Prospect, Illinois, United States
- Coordinates: 42°05′03.54″N 87°55′59.87″W
- Opened: October 27, 2011 (original: August 16, 1962)
- Closed: September 30, 2008
- Developer: Casto Lifestyle Properties (original); The Rouse Company (1980s renovation)
- Owner: DLC Management
- Architect: Beame Architectural partnership
- Num. of anchor tenants: 4 (3 open, 1 vacant)
- Floor area: 966,633 sq ft (89,803.1 m^{2})
- Floors: 1 (open-air) (3 in former Carson's and Parking Garage, 4 in Hampton by Hilton); 2 (original enclosed mall)
- Public transit: Pace
- Website: randhurstvillage.com

Randhurst Village (previously known as Randhurst Mall and Randhurst Center or simply known as Randhurst) is a shopping center located at the corner of Rand Road (U.S. Route 12) and Elmhurst Road (Illinois Route 83) in Mount Prospect, Illinois. The shopping center took its name from combining the names of these two roads into a portmanteau. The original owner of the shopping center was the Randhurst Corporation (a joint venture of Carson Pirie Scott, Wieboldt's, and Montgomery Ward). At the time of its 1962 opening, it was the first enclosed regional mall in the Chicago metropolitan area and the largest enclosed air-conditioned space in the United States. Most of the original mall building closed in 2008 and was demolished in 2009. The land was redeveloped as Randhurst Village, an open-air mixed-use shopping center. Currently owned by DLC Management, Randhurst is the location of national and regional retailers, several restaurants, second-floor offices, a 140-room hotel and a 12-screen cinema. It is now anchored by Macy's, Costco Wholesale, and AMC Theatres. Other stores include Home Depot, Jewel-Osco, PetSmart, and TJ Maxx among others.

== History ==
=== Early years ===
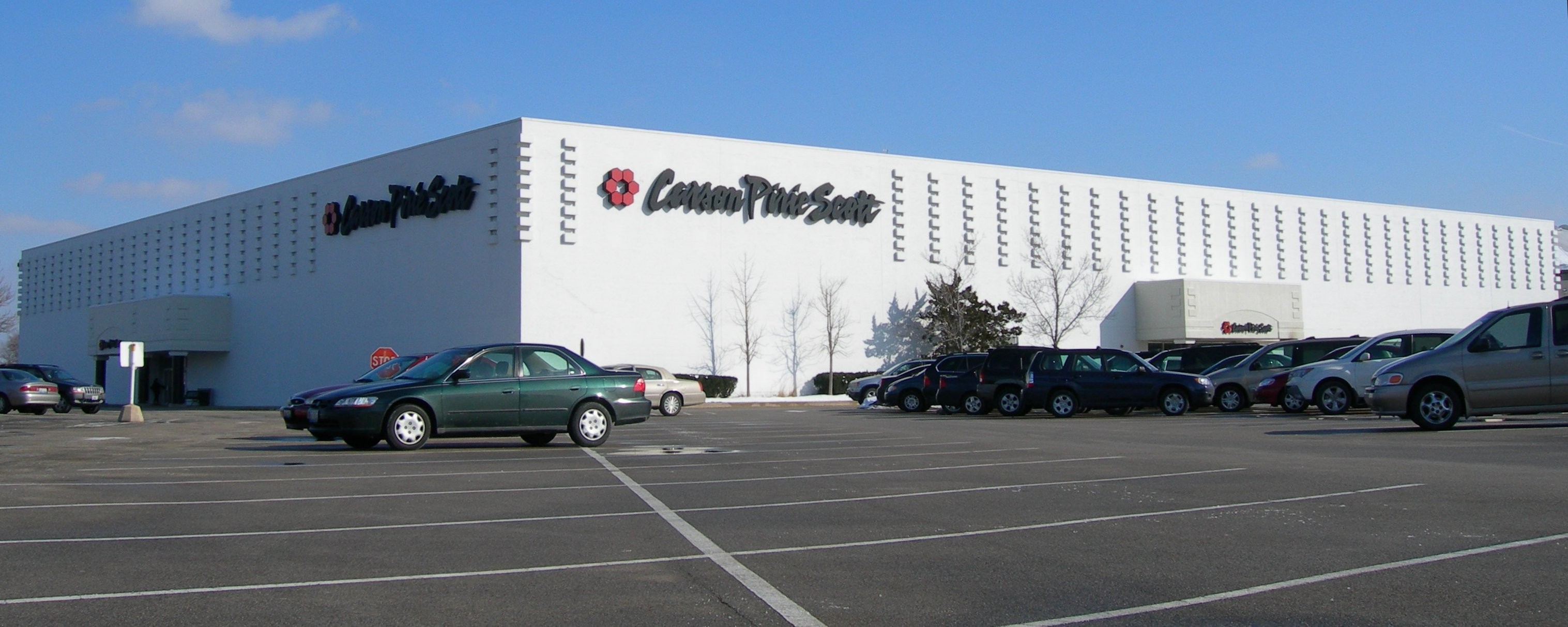
The Carson Pirie Scott anchor.

Randhurst was born out of a desire by Carson Pirie Scott to expand its business into the urban sprawl of Chicago's rapidly-expanding northwest suburbs. Spurred by Marshall Field's expansion into Skokie at the new Old Orchard Shopping Center in 1958, Carson Pirie Scott secured an 80-acre (320,000 m^{2}) lot in Mount Prospect to build a shopping mall. Studies showed the mall would serve an area of 300,000 residents, with another 100,000 expected by 1965. By 1959, the department stores Wieboldt's and Montgomery Ward had created a joint venture with Carson Pirie Scott, named the Randhurst Corporation. Instead of using its own nameplate, Montgomery Ward used that of its subsidiary brand The Fair on its anchor store. Randhurst was designed by Victor Gruen, a pioneer of modern shopping mall design. Unlike most shopping malls of the time, built in a straight line between two anchoring department stores, Gruen's design was shaped like an equilateral triangle, with an anchoring department store at each angle. Additional stores lined the sides of the triangle on two levels: a conventional level (termed the "mezzanine" level), continuous with the first floors of the anchor stores, and a level located half a floor below the first level (termed the "bazaar" level), located down a flight of stairs facing the first level. A floor of offices occupied the level above this "subfloor" of stores. A ring of clerestory windows was mounted in a domed area over the center of the mall; mounted just inside these windows were numerous stained glass windows in oval and round shapes, oriented to cast beams of colored light into the mall. As the mall was built at the height of the Cold War, it included a fallout shelter big enough to hold every citizen of Mount Prospect.

At its opening in 1962, the 1,000,000 sq ft (93,000 m^{2}) mall had three major department store anchors: Wieboldt's, Carson Pirie Scott, and The Fair. All three had two above-ground floors and a full basement. Of the three anchors, the Carson Pirie Scott anchor was the most distinctive, featuring turquoise-colored accents at the entrances and multi-colored lights around its perimeter. Other stores included Baskins, Charles A. Stevens, Jewel Food Stores, S.S. Kresge, and Woolworth. In 1963, The Fair store would be the first store in the chain to be renamed Montgomery Ward; Montgomery Ward also built an auto service center at the perimeter of the mall. Randhurst would retain this configuration well into the 1980s.

=== 1980s ===
In 1981, The Rouse Company acquired the mall from the Randhurst Corporation. In 1985, Rouse converted the upper sub-level of offices into a food court, one of the first in the Chicago area–and more retail space. A full conventional second floor of retail space was added by 1990. The "subfloor" of stores was also made larger and easier to access. In 1987, the Wieboldt's chain went bankrupt and closed its stores. Peoria, Illinois-based Bergner's acquired the empty Randhurst location. Shortly after, Elgin-based specialty department store Joseph Spiess Company built a junior anchor, 61,000 sq ft (5,700 m^{2}), next to the Wieboldt's/Bergner's anchor, and MainStreet added another junior anchor near the Montgomery Ward anchor (just before the chain was acquired by Kohl's). Spiess expanded too rapidly and too late for the market; as a consequence of this, the chain went bankrupt, and the store at Randhurst closed on January 31, 1992.

=== 1990s ===
In 1990, Bergner's (which had acquired Carson Pirie Scott in 1989) closed its Randhurst store, allowing Carson Pirie Scott to move into the grander ex-Wieboldt's building, while JCPenney took over the former Carson Pirie Scott anchor. Wickes Furniture briefly occupied the Spiess anchor, until Circuit City and Old Navy took over the space in 1995. Meanwhile, a new Filene's Basement junior anchor occupied the majority of the "bazaar" level. This brought Randhurst to its greatest level of occupancy ever, three major anchors and four junior anchors, and an all-time peak of 1,400,000 sq ft (130,000 m^{2}) of retail space.

The next ten years, however, would be much more difficult for Randhurst. The construction and expansion of multiple shopping malls in the area, especially the improvements to Woodfield Mall (which included The Streets of Woodfield) in nearby Schaumburg, devastated Randhurst's shopping base, as did the local population's general change in shopping tastes. In the mid-1990s, the mall's management tried to compensate by updating the mall's decor, opening The Home Depot in 1995. Jewel Osco demolished and rebuilt at the northeast perimeter of the mall respectively (moved out from the mall in 1970) in 1996; despite this, foot traffic fell, and stores began disappearing from the mall at a rapid rate. The Filene's Basement junior anchor closed in 1999 (along with three other Chicago-area Filene's Basement stores). In June 1999, a Borders book store was added to the mall’s perimeter. It closed in April 2011.

=== 2000s ===
The problems for Randhurst continued as one of Chicago's first lifestyle centers, Deer Park Town Center, opened in north suburban Deer Park in 2000. Open-air shopping centers began to regain popularity during this era, attracting patrons who historically shopped at Randhurst. Meanwhile, Randhurst suffered the loss of its JCPenney and Montgomery Ward anchors within months of each other in 2001. JCPenney had labeled the Randhurst store as an "underperformer," and closed the location. The Montgomery Ward anchor was remodeled and rebranded as Wards in 2000, as part of a chain-wide "last-ditch" effort to revive the brand. When this failed, the entire Wards chain closed and went out of business. In 2003, Kohl's moved to a space formerly occupied by Venture and Big Kmart near the corner of Elmhurst Road and Dempster Street on the south end of Mount Prospect. Following the sudden departure of these three anchor tenants, many stores inside the mall closed as well. The devastating loss of numerous tenants and anchors led many to believe that Randhurst was about to become a dead mall.

In 2004, some revitalization did occur, as a grand remodeling and repositioning scheme for the mall was put in motion. The former JCPenney and Kohl's anchors were demolished to build a new 160,000 sq ft (15,000 m^{2}) Costco anchor with no entry to the mall proper. The former Montgomery Ward anchor was mostly torn down to create a grand new "promenade" entrance for the mall. However, no upscale stores ever moved into the new addition. Applebee's did move from another section of the mall, but unlike its previous home - which had both exterior and interior entrances - the new location was serviced by an outdoor entrance exclusively. A Buffalo Wild Wings was built on an outlot close to Carson's and Jewel-Osco. Circuit City closed in early 2005, and Old Navy moved to nearby Arlington Heights, all in the midst of the new construction. Bed Bath & Beyond and Steve & Barry's quickly took their places – Bed Bath & Beyond moved into the former Circuit City retail space, while Steve & Barry's opened in the former Applebee's restaurant and Old Navy spaces in 2004 and 2005.

The mid-2000s renovation project largely failed to stop Randhurst’s decline. The mall’s historic Gruen design had been partially destroyed, and the renovation only temporarily helped stem the tenant outflow.

=== Redevelopment ===
In April 2007, the village of Mount Prospect approved a plan that included the demolition of the core of Randhurst. Designs by Larry Beame of Beame Architectural Partnership enabled the existing anchors to remain standing and be integrated into the redeveloped lifestyle center. Beame said the goal was to create "a traditional Main Street shopping experience" that featured a primary retail street, with diagonal parking and public spaces for socializing. Randhurst's final shopping day was Tuesday, September 30, 2008. By then, only two stores remained open inside the mall: Fashion Plus and Your Choice Gifts. Both stores were ordered by management to vacate by 9:00pm CST.

Demolition began in late 2008. The first buildings to be demolished were the mall offices near Carson Pirie Scott, so a new loading ramp could be constructed for the department store. The mall was then gutted, as it still contained hazardous asbestos insulation. By the summer of 2009, visible demolition work had begun on the mall’s core. Less than eleven months after Randhurst closed, the mall's signature dome was pulled down on August 28, 2009, ending the existence of Cook County's first enclosed mall.

The demolition crew tried to locate a time capsule planted somewhere in the center in 1962. In 2011, the Village of Mount Prospect planted a new time capsule at the center, after its reconstruction as Randhurst Village.

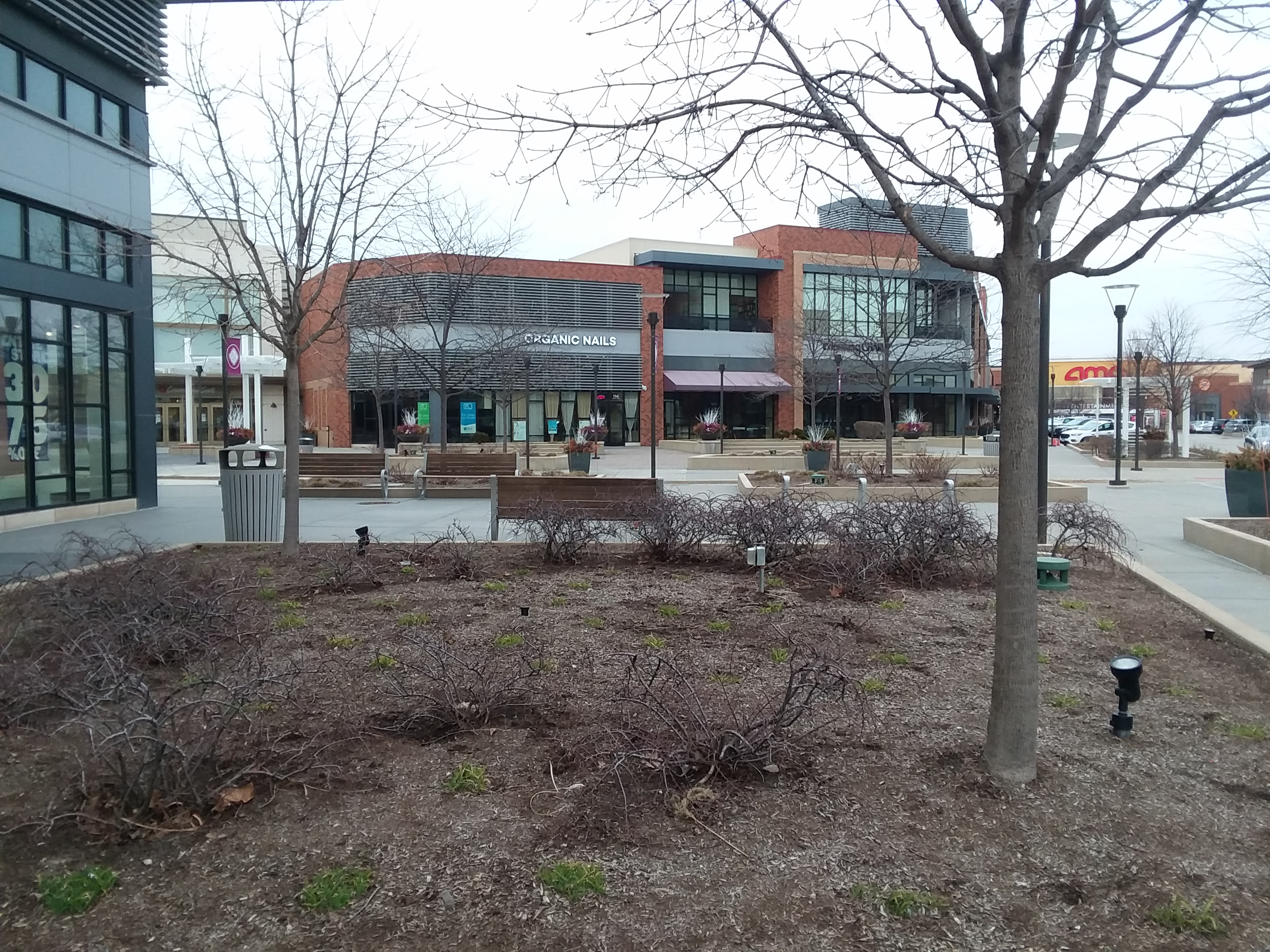
Center Court, Randhurst

=== 2010s ===
Construction of Randhurst Village began in the fall of 2009. Bon-Ton Stores, Inc. announced a remodeling of the Carson Pirie Scott anchor in May 2009, which was completed in November 2010. A new AMC movie theater, with 12 screens, replaced the Randhurst 16 outparcel theater - originally the General Cinema Fourplex (1962–1996) and purchased by AMC in 2002 - in April 2011. T.J. Maxx and Old Navy (returning from previous mall), also opened in Randhurst in 2011, while The Sports Authority replaced Steve & Barry's.

Several signification changes occurred also in 2011. A 120-room Hampton Inn & Suites opened alongside several new retailers and restaurants, including PetSmart, World Market, Tony Sacco’s Coal Oven Pizza (closed in 2013), Smokey Bone’s (closed in 2018), Subway and Verizon. The mall's Cold War bomb shelter was converted into underground parking for hotel guests.

It was announced that Experience, Parmida Homes and Torrid would be moving into the lifestyle center by the end of the year. Construction began on new buildings for BlackFinn Ameripub, @The Children’s Place (returning from previous mall), Charming Charlie and Panera.

In early 2013, Chef Rodelio Aglibot and his partners opened E+O (Earth and Ocean) Food and Drink in Randhurst Village. The restaurant closed in 2019.

After owning Randhurst for 23 years, JPMorgan Chase sold the 1 million-square-foot lifestyle center to New York-based DLC Management in 2015. At the time, it was the largest asset in DLC's portfolio.

The Sports Authority closed due to Chapter 11 Bankruptcy in 2016. A portion of it was replaced by Michael's in 2017, while the remainder of the store was replaced by Designer Shoes Warehouse (DSW) in 2019.

On April 18, 2018, the Bon-Ton Stores, Inc. company (owner of Carson's) announced that all of its stores would go into liquidation. The Carson's store closed on August 29, 2018.

=== 2020s ===
In January 2020, it was announced that the Bed Bath & Beyond store would close along, with 40 other stores in the United States and Canada.

In March 2022, HomeGoods opened in a corner of the former Carson’s store. In January 2024, Bath & Body Works opened. In September 2024, Planet Fitness opened inside former World Market store.

In November 2024, Macy's opened in the remainder of the former Carson's store.

== Bus routes ==
Pace

- 234 Wheeling/Des Plaines
