= Stratford Square Mall =

Defunct mall in Bloomingdale, IL

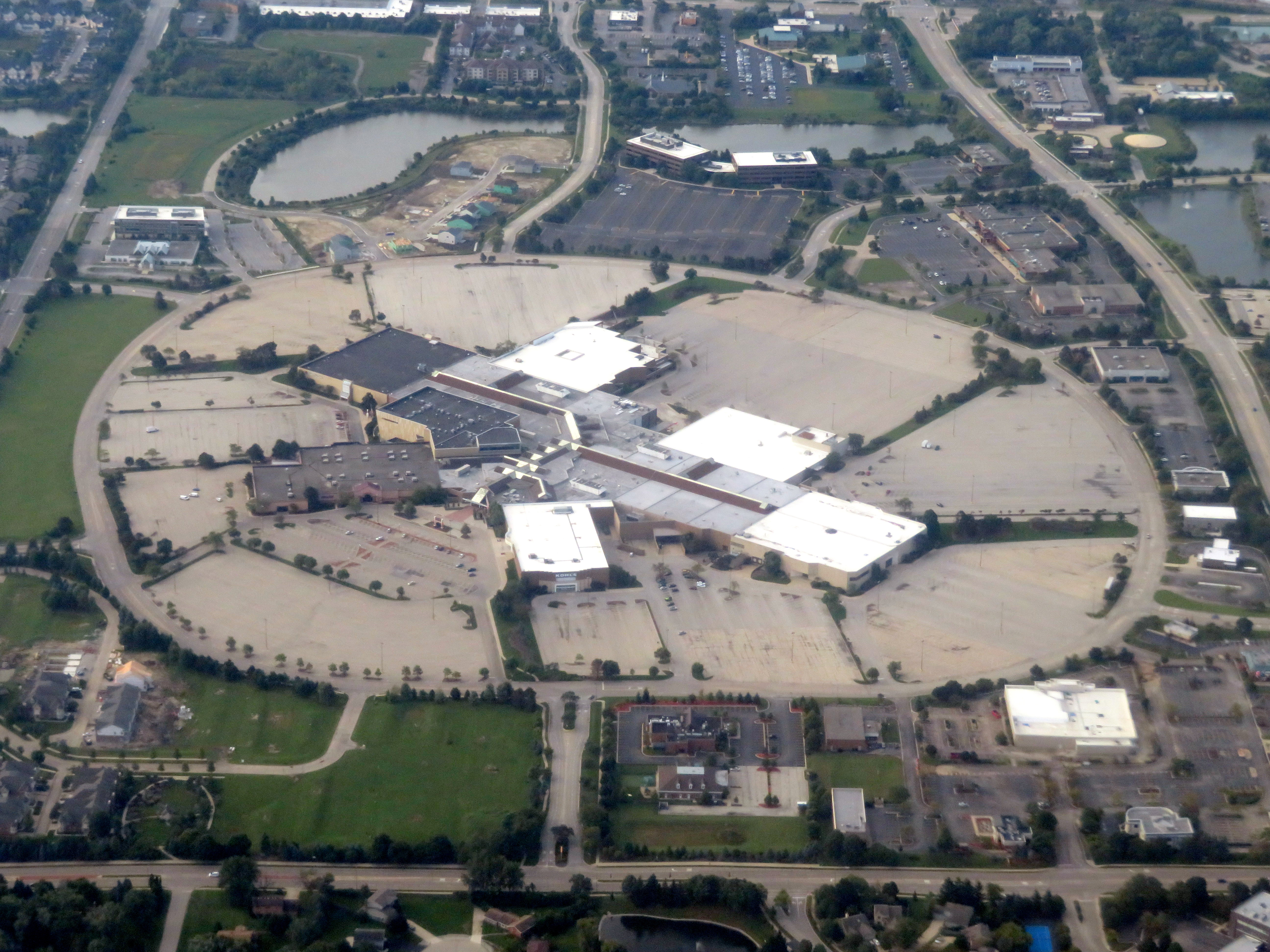
- Aerial view of Stratford Square Mall in 2018
- Location: Bloomingdale, Illinois, U.S.
- Coordinates: 41°56′56″N 88°6′54″W
- Opened: March 9, 1981; 45 years ago
- Renovated: 1999; 27 years ago
- Closed: April 21, 2024; 2 years ago
- Demolished: October 2024 – 2025
- Developer: Urban Investment and Development Company
- Manager: Village of Bloomingdale
- Owner: Village of Bloomingdale
- Architect: RTKL Associates
- Num. of stores: 135 (at peak)
- Num. of anchor tenants: 7 (at peak)
- Floor area: 1,311,930 square feet (121,882.3 m^{2})
- Floors: 2
- Parking: 698
- Public transit: Pace
- Website: www.stratfordmall.com (2023 archive)

Stratford Square Mall was a shopping mall that opened on March 9, 1981, in Bloomingdale, Illinois, a northwestern suburb of Chicago, Illinois, United States. Originally owned by Urban Retail Properties Co., the 1,300,000-square-foot (120,000 m^{2}) indoor shopping mall was designed by RTKL Associates, and built by Graycor of Oakbrook Terrace, Illinois. Just before its closing, Stratford Square had six vacant anchor spaces that were last occupied by JCPenney, Carson Pirie Scott, Sears, Round One, Century Theatres, and Burlington. The former Marshall Field's/Macy's space was demolished in 2019 to make way for a new Woodman's Markets grocery store building. The mall was bought by Namdar Realty Group in 2019. On January 22, 2024, the Village of Bloomingdale purchased the mall and gave all of the remaining tenants in the mall a 90-day notice. The mall closed on April 21, 2024. Demolition started on the mall in October 2024 and was completed in 2025.

== History ==
Ground was broken for Stratford Square Mall around mid to late 1979 and Stratford Square Mall officially opened on March 9, 1981 in response to the population and development boom then occurring in the northwest suburbs of Chicago. The mall was initially anchored by four major department stores—Marshall Field's, Carson Pirie Scott, Montgomery Ward, and Wieboldt's. Among its many features, observers lauded the mall's Festival Court, a "center within a center" spanning 330,000 square feet and comprising 44% of the mall area. Local newspapers optimistically opined on the mall's opening, going so far as to claim that "the sales tax revenues generated from Stratford Square... will be utilized to provide community services without increasing the Village's tax levy... with sound financial planning over several years, you will notice a decrease in the Village tax levy until it will no longer exist."

A MainStreet anchor was added near the Festival Court in 1985. This department store chain was purchased by the Kohl's department store chain in 1989, and all properties were converted into Kohl's. Wieboldt's became JCPenney in 1988 shortly after Wieboldt's went bankrupt in 1987. Sears added an anchor between Kohl's and the movie theater in 1991.

In the 1990s, nearby Woodfield Mall in Schaumburg completed a renovation and expansion, edging out Stratford Square as the first-choice mall in the region. Woodfield completed the overhaul and expansion in 1996, adding several new stores and a new two-level wing featuring a Nordstrom. Indeed, Woodfield's market dominance has continued to today, leading one publication to remark, "in Schaumburg, shoppers still are crowding Woodfield Mall and its 300-plus stores like it's 1993...".

On November 15, 1999, Stratford Square completed a major renovation while remaining open to allow customers to continue shopping throughout the duration of the renovation. Improvements included new flooring throughout the center, a new elevator, additional escalators, enlarged restrooms including two family rooms, comfortable seating areas and an expanded retail area on the lower level. A new water display was a focal point of the revised Festival Court. The original water displays next to the food court ran from the second floor to a mezzanine level and then down to the first floor. The theater was located behind it on the second and mezzanine levels. The water display on the second floor was removed because it was leaking from behind and was deemed too costly to repair. Over time, this water display was reduced and then eliminated, being replaced with first a Record Town and then a FYE store. Entrances were made more visible with the addition of enhanced signage and lighting, and automatic doors were installed at each mall entrance.

In December 2000, the Montgomery Ward department store chain announced that they would be closing all of their stores. The Stratford Square anchor closed in March 2001. In 2002, Burlington Coat Factory opened in the lower level of the former Montgomery Ward anchor. While a portion of the upper level of the anchor was walled off, this still remained the largest anchor in the mall.

New York-based Feldman Mall Properties acquired Stratford Square Mall in early 2005. The company renovated the four-screen movie theater into a Cinemark Century Theater, which opened on July 4, 2007 with 16 all-digital screens, a cappuccino bar, marble flooring, and stadium seating. After the movie theater renovation, a Red Robin restaurant was added next to the theater in 2008. A Steve & Barry's operated at the mall from about 2006 until 2009, until that chain's closure. In 2006, Macy's acquired the Marshall Field's anchor after acquiring their parent company, The May Department Stores Company. In October 2011, the computerized fountain in the central square next to the food court was replaced by a carousel, which was later relocated to the lower level of the Burlington Coat Factory wing in front of Round One and Finish Line, Inc., then finally removed in its entirety sometime between 2018 and 2019. In early 2012, the second floor of the Burlington Coat Factory was closed to customers with the exception of a hallway to the restrooms.

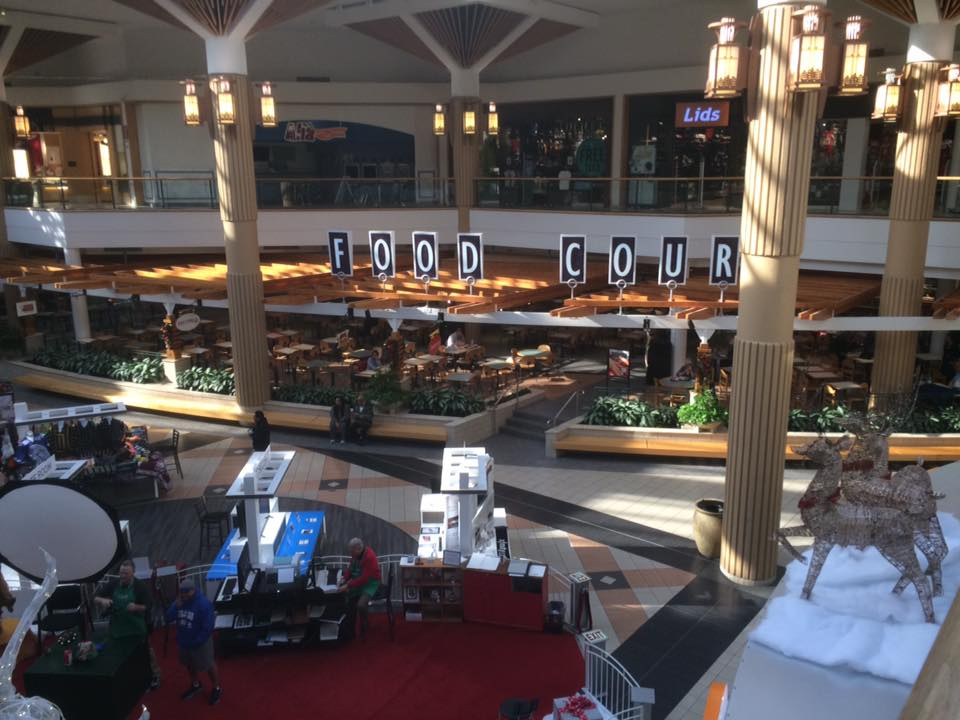
Interior of Stratford Square Mall, 2018

In early 2014, Stratford Square was acquired by StreetMac LLC. StreetMac did a few improvements while trying to manage the departure of several of the original anchor stores, developing plans to renovate parts of the mall. In late October 2014, Red Robin officials stated their plan to remodel their restaurant to introduce their new "Gourmet Burgers and Brews" concept, which would feature both indoor and outdoor seating. In 2015, Round One, an entertainment center that includes bowling, karaoke, arcade games, billiards, darts and ping pong, opened on the lower level of the Carson's wing.

On January 15, 2014, JCPenney announced that its anchor would be closing as part of a plan to close 33 stores nationwide; the anchor closed on May 3, 2014. On January 4, 2017, Macy's announced that they would also be closing their anchor as part of a plan to close 68 stores nationwide; the anchor closed on March 26, 2017. On April 18, 2018, Carson's announced that they would be closing their anchor as well, as their parent company The Bon-Ton was going out of business; the store closed on August 29, 2018. By that time, none of the remaining anchors were original to Stratford Square—Burlington Coat Factory opened in 2002 in what was originally a Montgomery Ward; Kohl's opened in 1989 in what was previously a MainStreet (itself not original to the mall, having opened in 1985); the Sears anchor was added in 1991.

In June 2018, Stratford Square management announced that Woodman's Markets would demolish the Macy's anchor and 30 feet of the mall, building a new store with no mall entrance. A 25 West Brewery opened later that year as part of a plan to change the tenant mix to 40% retail / 60% entertainment and dining. On August 6, 2019, it was announced that Sears would be closing their Stratford Square anchor as part of a plan to close 26 stores nationwide. The Sears anchor closed on November 10, 2019, leaving only Burlington Coat Factory and Kohl's as traditional anchors.

On October 10, 2019, Namdar Realty Group acquired the mall. 25 West Brewery closed in February 2020 after a contract dispute with Namdar. The Round One arcade closed on October 11, 2020.

In 2020, because of COVID-19 restrictions, the Kohl's anchor became inaccessible from the interior of the mall, with access only via the lower level parking lot nearest to Woodman's Markets. By July 2021, though, both upper and lower entrances to Kohl's had reopened, and Kohl's was once again accessible from inside the mall. As of October 2020, the theater had closed. Woodman's Food Market opened its doors on August 11, 2021. Amidst these struggles in its last decade of operation, local sources reported a precipitous decline in the mall's property value, with the figure declining from $20.3 million in 2012 to just $466,080 in 2021—spelling significant consequences for the Village of Bloomingdale's tax revenue.

On February 25, 2022, Burlington announced that they would be relocating from the mall into a former Kmart, across Gary Avenue from the mall in the Stratford Crossing strip mall, on February 24, 2023. This left Kohl's as the last remaining traditional anchor store.

By 2022, many citizens and organizations were calling for a "re-envisioning" of Stratford Square Mall, including Bloomingdale Village President Franco Coladipietro, who advocated for the demolition of this "vacant eyesore" and its replacement with street-level retail and restaurants with surrounding residential buildings. In May 2023, the Village of Bloomingdale, in preparation for redeveloping the property, sued Namdar Realty Group for not maintaining the mall and for not actively leasing mall space. The village paid $2.4 million for the former Carson Pirie Scott anchor and $1.1 million for the former Burlington (Montgomery Ward) anchor. On September 6, 2023, the Village of Bloomingdale acquired the former Sears anchor for $2,800,000. On January 8, 2024, the Daily Herald announced that the Village of Bloomingdale had settled their lawsuit against Namdar Realty Group. The village would pay $8,750,000 for the acquisition of the remaining portions of the mall for redevelopment.

On January 13, 2024, FYE shuttered their Stratford Square Mall location after over 20 years as a tenant. Namdar, per legal obligations, announced that the remainder of the mall's interior would permanently close in 30 days (the anticipated closing date was set for February 15, or March 15, 2024, depending on the individual contract with each store). However, the village of Bloomingdale extended the closing date to April 21, 2024. The mall officially closed on April 21, 2024, with Kohl’s remaining open as a standalone business.

On August 13, 2024, the Village of Bloomingdale released new redevelopment plans for the Stratford Square Mall area and the property was renamed The Grove. Demolition of the old mall began in October 2024 and was completed by June 2025. On December 10, 2025, the Village of Bloomingdale announced the official site plans, logo, and first tenant for what is now known as The Grove at Bloomingdale, a new $78 million mixed-use development slated to include luxury apartments, a man-made lake, and an area for outdoor events such as concerts. The Grove's first tenant, Bloomingdale Yard—an indoor sports and recreation facility—is slated to open in 2027, with the remainder of the Grove estimated to be completed in "five to eight years", according to village president Franco Coladipietro.

== Incidents ==
=== Acid spill incident ===
On June 1, 1990, a 220-gallon carboy containing less than 50% sulfuric acid and less than 4% phosphoric acid slipped off a tailgate during delivery at the mall and 100 gallons of the chemical spilled. The chemical entered the mall's sewers and was picked up by the Marshall Field's anchor's fresh air intake system. Over 15 employees working inside the department store were taken to the closest hospital, treated, and released. The spilled chemical was supplied by Phoenix Industrial, and contains less than 4% phosphoric acid, less than 3% sodium tolyltriazole, less than 50% sulfuric acid, and more than 43% non-hazardous ingredients.
