= Harlem Irving Plaza =

Shopping mall in Norridge, Illinois

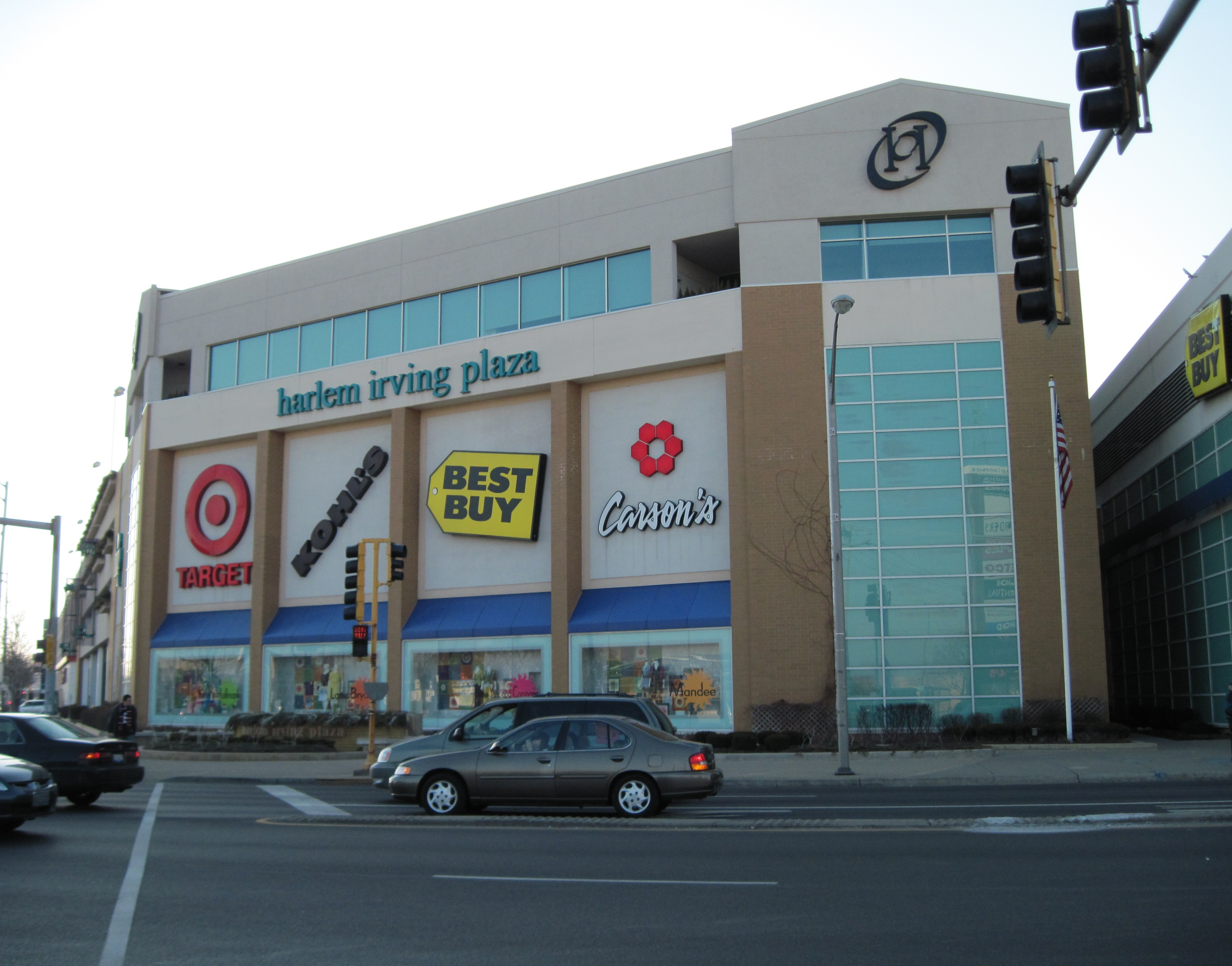
- Location: Norridge, Illinois, United States
- Coordinates: 41°57′19.5″N 87°48′29″W
- Address: 4104 N Harlem Ave
- Opened: 1956
- Manager: Harlem Irving Companies
- Owner: Harlem Irving Companies
- Num. of stores: 140+
- Num. of anchor tenants: 10
- Floor area: 725,000 sq ft (67,400 m^{2}).
- Floors: 2, plus partial basement, and 3 in former Carson Pirie Scott
- Parking: 2,600
- Public transit: Chicago Transit Authority
- Website: shopthehip.com

Harlem Irving Plaza (commonly referred to as "The HIP") is a shopping mall located in Norridge, Illinois, a suburb of Chicago. The mall features over 100 stores and a food court. The mall's anchor stores are Kohl's, Nordstrom Rack, LA Fitness, Xfinity, Best Buy, Target, Hobby Lobby, DSW, Five Below, Toys"R"Us, and Dick's. It is one of the oldest shopping malls in the Chicago area.

== History ==
Built on the site of a former livestock farm, Harlem Irving Plaza opened in 1956 as a 337,000-square-foot (31,300 m^{2}) strip mall featuring approximately 45 tenants. Original anchor stores included Kroger, Walgreens, Wieboldt's, W.T. Grant, and Woolworth. The plaza became a member of the International Council of Shopping Centers a year after opening.

Between 1975 and 1979, the former strip mall was enclosed, and a parking garage was added. Also in 1979, Madigan's was added to the roster of department stores. MainStreet, a short-lived subsidiary of Federated Department Stores opened at the mall in 1987, just as Wieboldt's closed. In 1989, Kohl's acquired and converted all of the stores in the MainStreet chain; Carson Pirie Scott opened in the former Wieboldt's the same year. A food court was added in 1996, and Best Buy opened in the former Madigan's. Best Buy re-located to the mall's parking lot in 2001; its original location was replaced with a second parking garage. The mall underwent a thorough renovation in 2004, gaining a 175,000-square-foot (16,300 m^{2}) Target in August of that year. In honor of the mall's 50th anniversary in 2006, Harlem Irving Plaza hosted a meet and greet with the original Mouseketeers (Mickey Mouse Club). In honor of the mall's 60th anniversary in 2016, Harlem Irving Plaza hosted a meet and greet with Bobby Hull, Mike Ditka and Dick Butkus.

Sports Authority, Panera Bread, Chipotle Mexican Grill, and a fitness center were to be added in a 2013 expansion. Sports Authority has since closed. It was announced that in the fall of 2017 Nordstrom Rack would take the place of the vacated Sports Authority location. Carson's has since gone out of business, which prompted a transformation of the shuttered retailer into a large atrium and new entry for visitors entering via the upper parking deck.

In early October 2021, Dick's Sporting Goods opened its doors on the mall's third floor addition with fellow-anchor Hobby Lobby pre-occupying the second floor. Hobby Lobby and Dick's Sporting Goods as of November 2021 are the sole two occupants of the above-first level expansion to the mall initially finalized in 2020. Target is the only other second floor holding retailer although their second floor does not have a mall entrance.

On October 26, 2024, Toys "R" Us opened standalone 10,000-square-foot (930 m^{2}) store.

== Bus routes ==
CTA

- 78 Montrose
- 80 Irving Park
- 90 Harlem
