= Jefferson Square Mall =

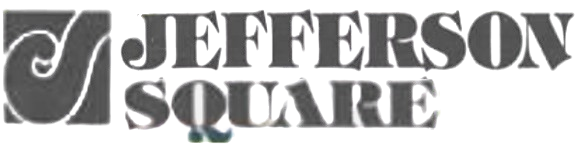
- Location: Joliet, Illinois United States
- Coordinates: 41°31′11″N 88°08′37″W
- Address: 2450 W Jefferson St, Joliet, IL 60435
- Opened: February 28, 1975; 51 years ago
- Closed: 2002; 24 years ago
- Demolished: 2004
- Previous names: Wilderness Mall
- Developer: Melvin Simon and Associates
- Manager: Menards Properties
- Owner: Menards Properties
- Num. of stores: 60 (at peak)
- Num. of anchor tenants: 2 (at peak)
- Floor area: 553,295 square feet (51,402.8 m^{2})
- Floors: 1

Jefferson Square Mall, also known as Wilderness Mall, was a 553,295 square feet (51,402.8 m^{2}) shopping mall in Joliet, Illinois, United States. Opened in 1975, it originally featured Wieboldt's and Montgomery Ward. The mall closed in 2002, and was demolished in 2004 to build a Walmart and Menards.

== History ==
Jefferson Square Mall was developed by Melvin Simon and Associates, now known as Simon Property Group. Wieboldt's opened in August of 1974, and Montgomery Ward opened in October of 1974.

The mall opened on February 28, 1975, consisting of 553,295 square feet (51,402.8 m^{2}) of shop space. Jefferson Square Mall was the first enclosed shopping mall in Joliet. Louis Joliet Mall opened nearby in 1978, providing competition to Jefferson Square.

In 1987 Wieboldt's closed the Jefferson Square store along with 7 other stores. Their space was replaced by a Menards home improvement store.

In 1996, the property was renamed Wilderness Mall. Despite these renovations, the mall continued to decline in tenancy. By 2000 the mall only had 13 tenants out of the over 60 store slots. some included an off-track betting parlor, a paint gun store, a travel agency, a preschool, and a social services agency. Montgomery Ward closed that same year.

In 2002, Wilderness Mall was purchased by Menard Properties. They planned to demolish the mall for a newer, larger Menards as well as a Walmart supercenter. Demolition began in 2004 and was completed in 2006, with construction of Menards beginning in 2007 and Walmart in 2008.
