= Wieboldt's =

Former US department store chain

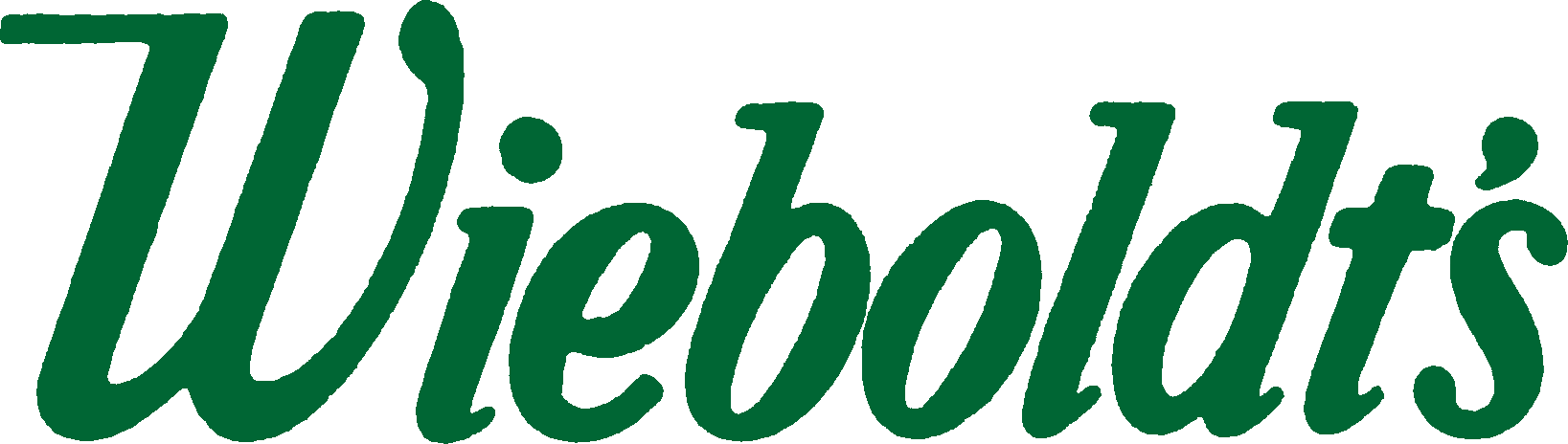
- Type: Department store
- Industry: Retail
- Founded: 1883 Chicago, Illinois
- Defunct: 1987 (all stores have closed)
- Fate: Bankruptcy
- Headquarters: Chicago, Illinois
- Products: Clothing, footwear, bedding, furniture, jewelry, beauty products, home electronics, small appliances and housewares

Wieboldt Stores, Inc., also known as Wieboldt's, did business as a Chicago general retailer between 1883 and 1987. It was founded in 1883 by storekeeper William A. Wieboldt. The flagship location was at One North State Street Store in Chicago.

== History ==
Wieboldt's operated its flagship store at State Street and Madison Street in Downtown Chicago. In 1961, Wieboldt's acquired the failed Mandel Brothers store on State Street as well as a smaller branch store in Lincoln Village shopping center. By the 1970s Wieboldt's operated more than 15 stores in the Chicago metropolitan area.

Wieboldt's celebrated 100 years in business in April 1983. An advertisement in the Chicago Sun-Times stated "Building for a New Tomorrow". "An important part of Chicago's past, we look to the future with confidence and enthusiasm. The dream of yesterday is the promise of tomorrow. Chicago, Wieboldt's. Tomorrow begins today."

During the 1980s, the chain had trouble staying profitable, eventually leading the company into bankruptcy in 1986. The chain never recovered and all the stores closed.

== Stores ==
Stores closed on March 10, 1987:

- Jefferson Square Mall, Joliet
- Lakeview (3239 N. Lincoln Ave. near Belmont) - now XSport Fitness
- Lincoln Mall, Matteson, Illinois
- Lincoln Village, Chicago
- Orland Park Place (across 151st Street from Orland Square Mall) - now de-malled, with multiple out-facing stores
- River Forest near Lake St and Harlem Ave
- Stratford Square Mall, Bloomingdale, Illinois
- Yorktown Mall, Lombard, Illinois

Four stores remained open longer:

- 1 N. State Street at Madison Street in Downtown Chicago's Loop - former Mandel Brothers store. 9 stories, reduced to 5 floors in 1985. Closed July 18, 1987.
- Ford City Mall, West Lawn, Chicago - closed before or by Nov. 1987 - became Carson Pirie Scott
- Randhurst Village in Mt. Prospect, Illinois - closed Dec. 1987, 209,000 sq ft (19,400 m^{2}), became Bergner's
- Harlem Irving Plaza in Norridge, 3 floors

Other stores in Chicago:

- Ashland Avenue and Madison Street, Chicago
- 1279 Milwaukee Avenue near Paulina Street, Wicker Park, Chicago
- 63rd Street and Halsted Street
- Evanston, Illinois (Church and Oak)
- Meadowdale Shopping Center, Carpentersville, Illinois
- Waukegan (Lakehurst Mall)
- Oak Park, Illinois (Lake and Harlem)

== Promotions ==
Wieboldt's was known for giving S&H Green Stamps with purchases, and there were redemption centers located in their stores. The State Street location included a particularly large redemption center. Customers would choose items based on the number of stamps redeemed. In the 1940s and 1950s, and then again in the mid-1980s, they sponsored a broadcast program featuring The Cinnamon Bear: stories of how Cinnamon Bear takes his young friends on a trip to maybe land in search of the Silver Star. A stuffed teddy bear version could be purchased from the stores for $2.98 in the 1950s, and Santa would give out free Cinnamon Bear buttons to children visiting Santa. The program was first produced by Glen Heisch and Elizabeth Heisch in 1937 in Hollywood and syndicated around the country. Wieboldt's had a number of memorable radio ads on radio during Chicago Cubs games in the early 1960s, featuring announcers Jack Quinlan and Lou Boudreau. Some of them can be heard at Wieboldt's Commercials Quinlan & Boudreau.

=== Slogans ===
- "Where You Buy With Confidence"
- "The Values Speak For Themselves"
