= Yorktown Center =

Shopping mall in Lombard, Illinois

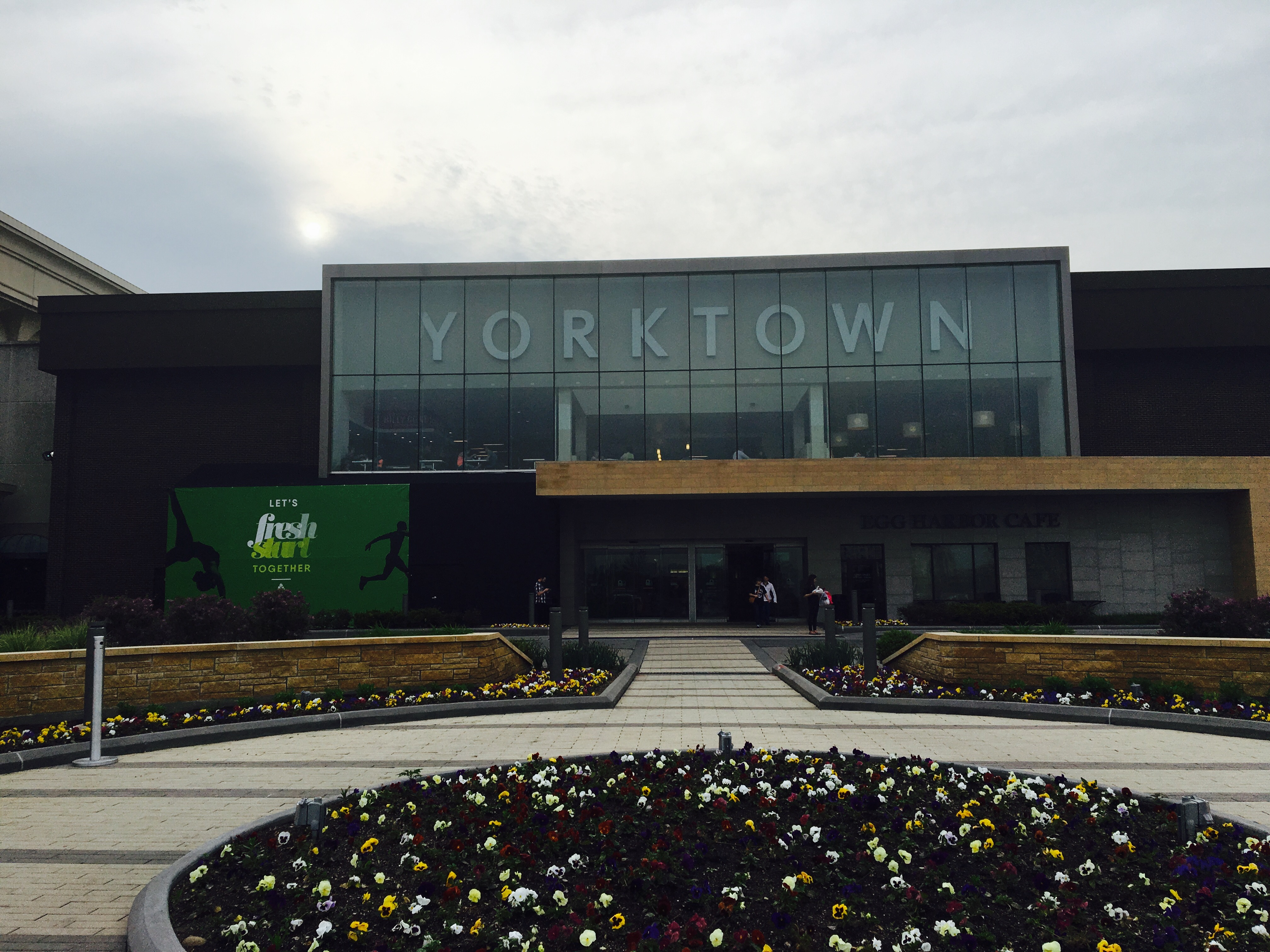
- Location: Lombard, Illinois, United States
- Coordinates: 41°50′23″N 88°0′26″W
- Address: 203 Yorktown Center
- Opened: October 10, 1968; 58 years ago
- Developer: E. D. Pehrson
- Manager: Pacific Retail
- Owner: Pacific Retail Capital Partners
- Architect: Victor Gruen and Sidney H. Morris
- Num. of stores: 189
- Num. of anchor tenants: 2
- Floor area: 1,500,000 square feet (139,354.6 m^{2})
- Floors: 2 (3 in Von Maur)
- Public transit: Pace
- Website: yorktowncenter.com

Yorktown Center is a shopping mall located in the village of Lombard, a suburb of Chicago, Illinois, United States. The mall features JCPenney and Von Maur anchors, as well as an 18-screen dine-in AMC Theatres on an outparcel.

== History ==
=== Early years ===
At the time of its 1968 opening, the 1,300,000-square-foot (120,000 m^{2}) Yorktown Center was the second-largest enclosed mall east of the Mississippi. The mall was originally a four-anchor indoor mall—three-story Carson Pirie Scott and Wieboldt's anchor department stores faced each other across a central courtyard, while wings for two-story JCPenney and Montgomery Ward anchor department stores stretched northward and southward, respectively, from the center courtyard. North of the mall proper, a strip mall dubbed the "Convenience Center" was constructed. This was originally anchored by a Grand Union supermarket. Other perimeter buildings included auto centers for the JCPenney and Montgomery Ward anchors, a General Cinema movie theater, a bank, and two restaurants.

=== 1980s ===
A mid-1980s remodeling replaced the dark tile and flat white facades of the mall areas with pastels and neon lighting. Skylights were added to bring sunlight into the shopping center. As part of this project, freestanding elevators were added to each wing, replacing the "floating" staircases. Later that same decade, a pair of escalators was added near the JCPenney and Montgomery Ward anchors, with additional retail space built under each pair of escalators. (Previous to these remodelings, there were no elevators in the mall proper, and only one pair of criss-crossed escalators at the center of the courtyard.) The vacant supermarket anchor of the Convenience Center became a Scandinavian Design furniture store.

Unlike nearby Oakbrook Center—which would add to its anchor collection three times in twenty years—the middle-market Yorktown Center would lose multiple anchors over the same span. Wieboldt's was the first anchor store to close, shuttered at the bankruptcy of the chain in 1987; the anchor lay vacant for seven years, until Von Maur remodeled the anchor and opened it as their first Chicago-area store in 1994. This Von Maur store is the second largest in the chain, the largest being at Perimeter Mall that opened in 2012 in Dunwoody, Georgia.

=== 1990s ===
Madigan's, a two-level clothing store near JCPenney, closed in 1992. This space remained unoccupied until it was rebuilt as a food court upstairs and retail space downstairs. The original Madigan's escalator remains in the middle of the food court.

When Woolworth's closed in 1997, it remained empty until Big Idea Productions, an animation studio known for its VeggieTales series, took over the space in 1999. Big Idea had originally planned to use the space as temporary offices as they rebuilt and expanded the local DuPage Theater into a new corporate headquarters, but when that space required more work than they expected, they donated the theater to the village and stayed in Yorktown. When Big Idea Productions relocated to Franklin, Tennessee in July 2004, the company vacated their mall space, which was eventually converted to Steve & Barry's.

Meanwhile, the perimeter of the mall became the site of further development, featuring a Target Greatland which opened in October 1996. The JCPenney Auto Center would be redeveloped into The Pacific Club, a nightclub managed by Chicago football icon Walter Payton's restaurant group. The General Cinema movie theater would be torn down and replaced with an eighteen-screen megaplex with screens for dine-in movies. Despite a remodeling, the Convenience Center lost several prominent tenants, including an Ace Hardware store. However, the anchor space—vacant after the closure of the Scandinavian Design chain—was acquired by Carson Pirie Scott to serve as the new location for their furniture department.

=== 2000s ===
At the beginning of the decade, a major remodeling of the central courtyard took place. The narrow, linear bridge between the north and south sides of the courtyard was demolished, along with its pair of escalators. In its place, a wide diagonal bridge was built, with two pairs of escalators. As part of the project, a customer service desk was built near the north-side escalator; the mall had no such desk prior to this time.

The Montgomery Ward anchor closed when that chain was liquidated in 2001. After a short stint as Magellan's Furniture, it was demolished for a lifestyle center section known as "The Shops on Butterfield". This new section, anchored by HomeGoods, Marshalls, and Lucky Strike Lanes (a bowling alley), opened in 2007. The former Montgomery Ward Auto Center was replaced by a Claim Jumper restaurant. That same year, an eighteen-story Westin hotel opened outside the mall. At the same time, the Convenience Center was renamed "The Shops at Yorktown"; despite the popularity of the Carson Pirie Scott furniture gallery, which added on an expansion, it continued to exhibit a high rate of vacancies.

=== 2010s ===
In April 2012, Yorktown Center was bought by a partnership between KKR and YTC Pacific for $196 million.

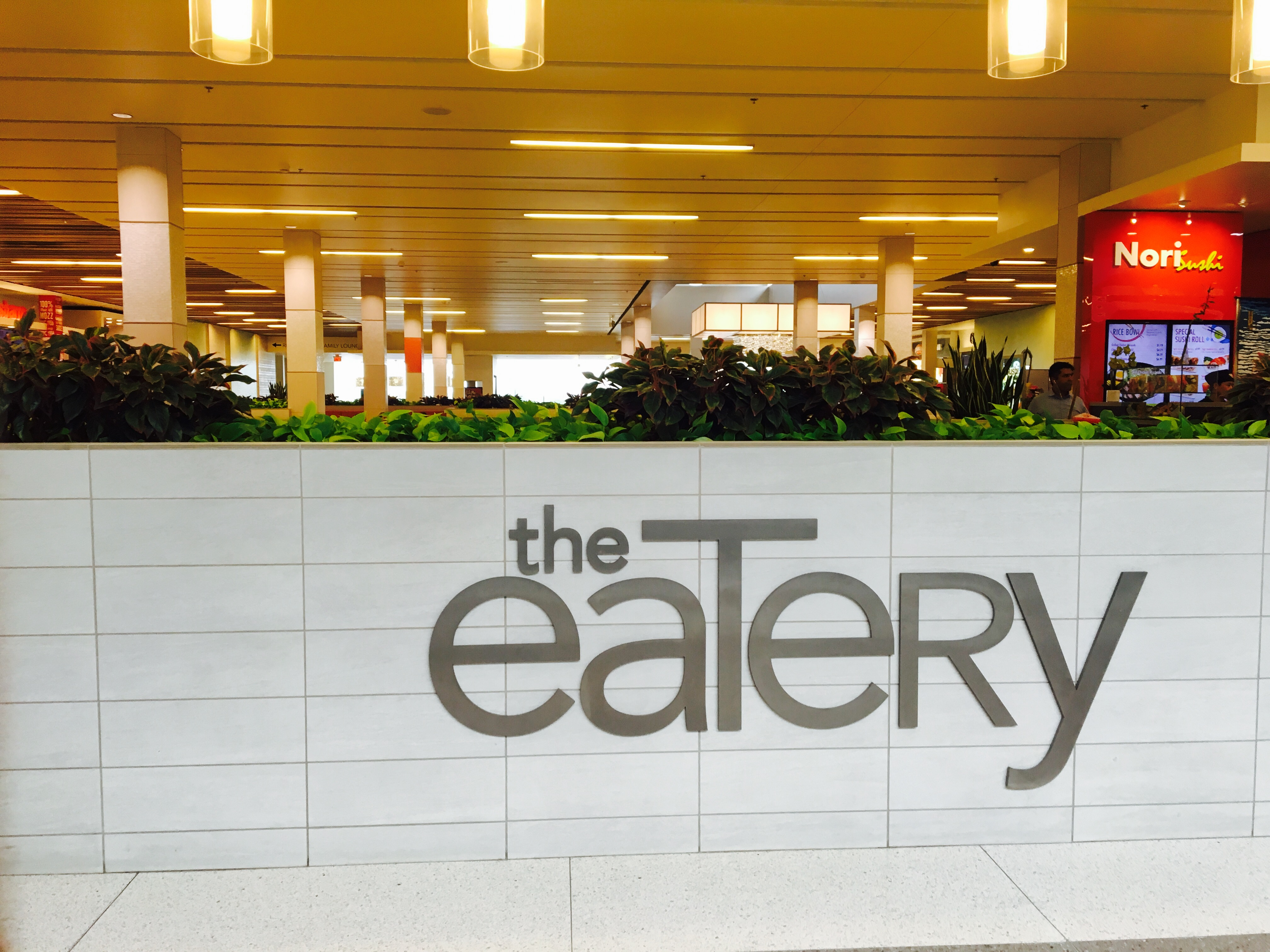
Yorktown Center Food Court

In 2014, Yorktown Center management spent $18 million renovating the food court by adding more healthy options. Upgrades in the food court added 200 seats, entertainment screens, work stations for shoppers to plug in laptops, and a family lounge.

In April 2018, the Carson Pirie Scott anchor store closed, when its parent company went out of business. In 2019, two luxury apartment buildings—Elan and Overture—were opened on the north side of the mall grounds. These properties are managed and owned by Greystar.

=== 2020s ===
In November 2020, Pac-Man Zone was opened.

In 2021, Lombard approved the construction of an Olive Garden on the south side of the center. The restaurant opened in 2023.

In 2022, D.R. Horton sought to acquire a portion of the vacant strip mall (Shops of Yorktown) on the north side of the center for additional multi-family housing. The Village approved the project for 90 townhomes in a development named The Summit at Yorktown.

In 2022, it was announced that Pacific Retail Capital Partners (PRCP) would redevelop the 12-acre site of the former Carson Pirie Scott anchor store into a mixed use apartment complex, retail, and park/outdoor space. Demolition of the site to pave way for construction began in 2024 and was finished by 2025. Construction then began on the new development in 2025. In 2026, the first phase of the new development was completed which included the mixed use apartment complex and outdoor space with a new entrance to the mall. The new mixed use site is known as The Square. The new apartment complex, which are luxury apartments, is known as the Yorktown Reserve.

== Cemetery ==
One unusual feature is the Boeger-Brinkman Cemetery on the southern end of the parking lot, along Butterfield Road. The cemetery was part of a family's farmland that was sold to develop Yorktown Center. A small section of the cemetery remains while others were moved for the construction of the shopping center.

== Sales tax rate ==
The sales tax rate for Lombard is 8%. However, an additional 1 percent is added to the sales tax in the Business Improvement District, which includes the new development on the site of the old Montgomery Wards store and a portion of the southwest wing of Yorktown (i.e., the region of Yorktown Mall which includes The Shops on Butterfield). Additionally, restaurants in the Yorktown area that offer sit-down dining are subject to an additional 1 percent Places for Eating Tax; this mainly involves the outlets along Highland Avenue and Butterfield Road.

== Bus routes ==
Pace

- 313 St. Charles Road
- 322 Cermak Road/22nd Street
- 715 Central Dupage
- 722 Ogden Avenue
- 834 Joliet/Downers Grove
