= The Fair (store) =

Department store in Chicago (1874–1984)

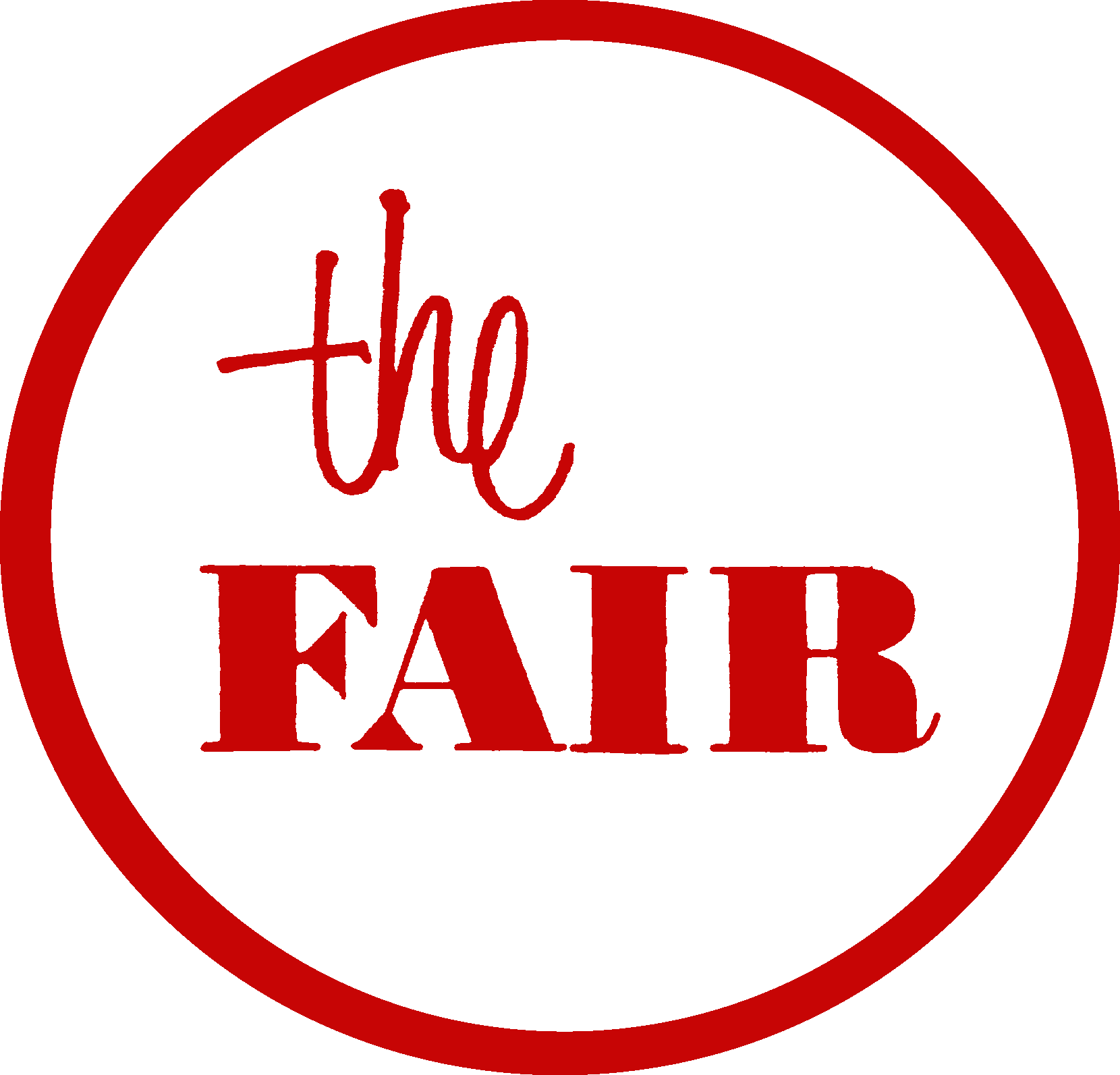

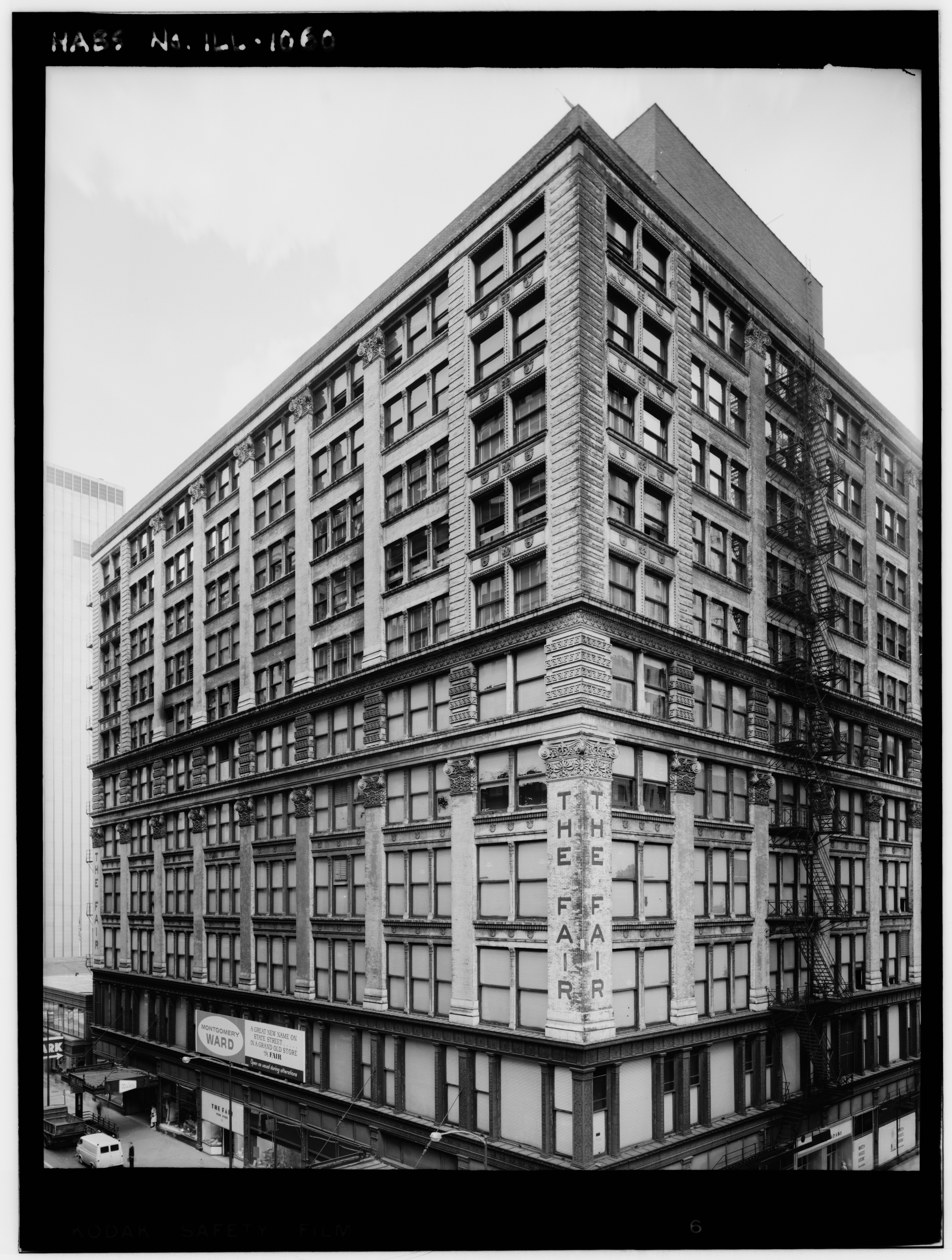
- Type: Discount department store
- Industry: Retail
- Founded: 1874
- Headquarters: Chicago, Illinois
- Products: Apparel, fabrics, furniture, sewing machines, baby buggies, toys and games for adults, inexpensive household items

The Fair was a discount department store founded in 1874 in Chicago, Illinois.

== History ==
Founder Ernst J. Lehmann named the store "The Fair", saying "the store was like a fair, because it offered many different things for sale at a cheap price." Lehmann bought and sold goods on a cash-only basis; he offered odd prices (i. e., prices not in multiples of five cents) to save customers a few pennies on every purchase. The flagship store moved to the corner of State and Adams Streets in 1875; a modern twelve-story building for the store designed by William Le Baron Jenney would be completed on that site in 1891.

The Fair promoted itself as a discount department store in the early 1900s. In 1915, a booklet published by the store stated it "always has been and undoubtedly always will be, the store of the people, the down-town shopping center for the Savers, the market place for the Thrifty." In 1925, Lehmann sold the business to a syndicate headed by S.S. Kresge (predecessor firm of Kmart). The new owners opened branches on Milwaukee Avenue (1929), in Oak Park, Illinois (1929), at the Evergreen Plaza Shopping Center (1952), and at the Old Orchard Shopping Center (1956).

In 1957, Montgomery Ward purchased the company from the Kresge syndicate, in a bid to expand its Chicago operations. Unlike many other retailers, Montgomery Ward had not joined in the construction of suburban branch stores immediately following World War II. Initially, the stores retained The Fair nameplate. One more The Fair store opened at the new Randhurst Mall in 1962. It was the first store to be converted to the Montgomery Ward nameplate, in August 1963. The other locations converted to the parent company's name in 1964. The flagship store on State Street closed in 1984 and was demolished in 1985. Though redevelopment was planned for the valuable site, it was not until 2001 that a new building was constructed there.
