= Westfield Old Orchard =

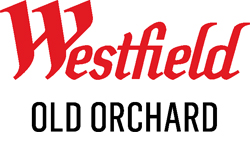

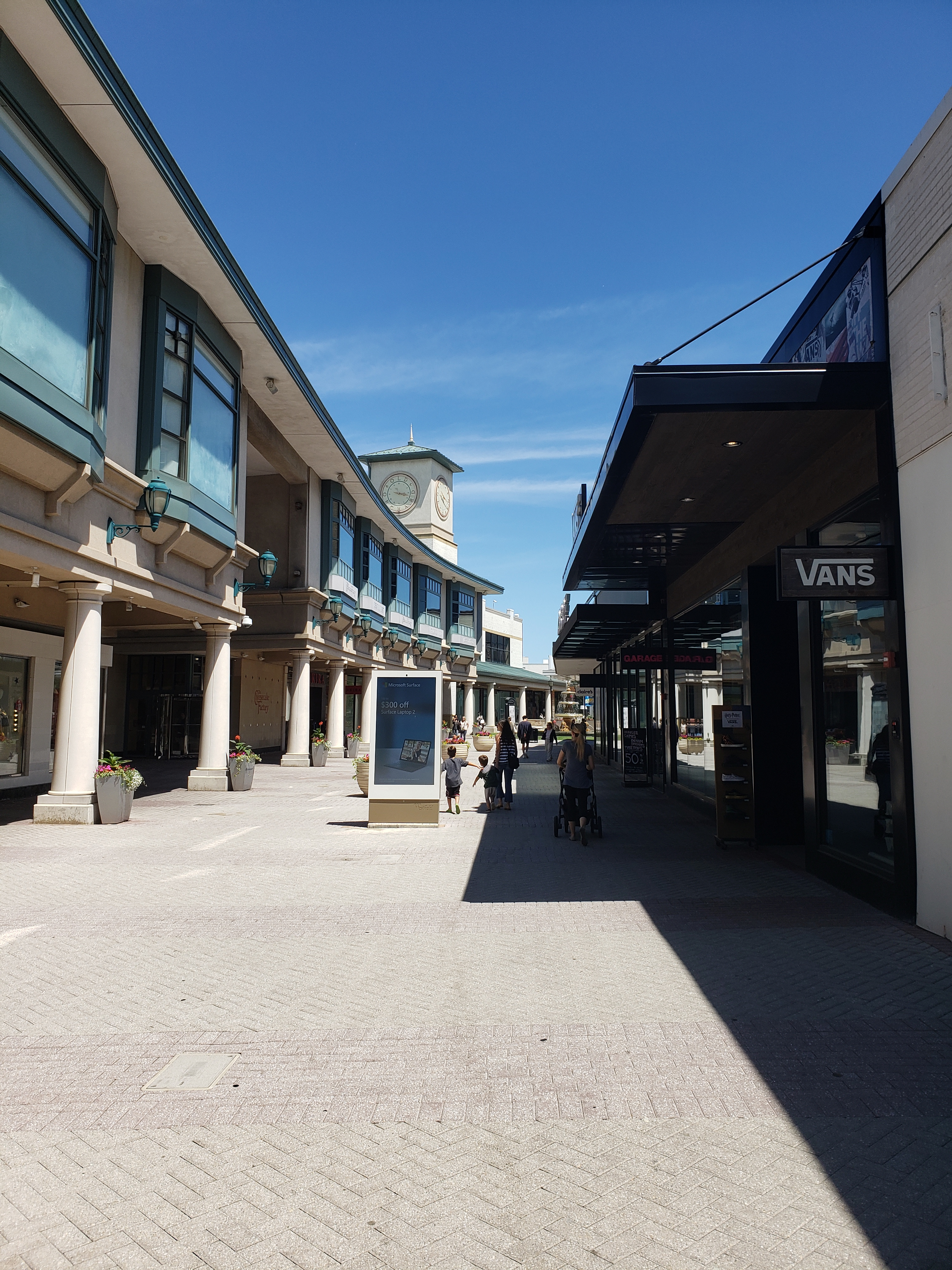
- Westfield Old Orchard in June 2019
- Location: Skokie, Illinois, United States
- Coordinates: 42°3′33″N 87°44′58″W
- Address: 4905 Old Orchard Center, Skokie, IL 60077
- Opened: October 25, 1956; 70 years ago
- Previous names: Old Orchard Shopping Center (1956–2002); Westfield Shoppingtown Old Orchard (2002–2005)
- Developer: Philip Morris Klutznick
- Manager: Unibail-Rodamco-Westfield
- Owner: Unibail-Rodamco-Westfield
- Num. of stores: 156
- Num. of anchor tenants: 2
- Floor area: 1,582,295 sq ft (147,000.0 m^{2})
- Floors: 1 (2 in Nordstrom, ZARA, Toms Price Furniture, Barnes and Noble, Maggiano's Little Italy, Pottery Barn, L.L.Bean, Crate & Barrel, Red Parking Garage, Management Office, Cheesecake Factory, Regal Cinemas, and Green Parking Garage, 4 in Macy's, 5 in Purple Parking Garage, 6 in Orange Parking Garage, 7 in Professional Building)
- Public transit: Chicago Transit Authority; Pace
- Website: www.westfield.com/united-states/oldorchard

Westfield Old Orchard, formerly Old Orchard Shopping Center, is a shopping center in the Chicago metropolitan area. It is located in Skokie, Illinois. The shopping center features the traditional retailers Macy's and Nordstrom, in addition to a CMX luxury cinema. The mall features prominent specialty retailers such as Vineyard Vines, Madewell, Anthropologie, Fabletics, Kendra Scott, Tory Burch, and Warby Parker.

== History ==
The huge Marshall Field & Company anchor store was the first portion of the mall to open, on October 22, 1956. The Old Orchard Shopping Center itself opened on October 25, 1956, while a second anchor department store, The Fair, opened on November 1, 1956. A third anchor store, Saks Fifth Avenue, opened on November 6, 1958. The Fair was renamed Montgomery Ward in 1964. Two parking structures, the North and West Garages, were built in 1978. Saks Fifth Avenue moved to a larger location in 1978, selling their previous store to Lord & Taylor.

Since many prospective tenants wanted to be near Marshall Field's, the anchor was placed in the center of the site.

Montgomery Ward closed in 1988. In 1991, Nordstrom announced plans to open its second Chicago area location at Old Orchard. In addition to a 200,000-square-foot (19,000 m^{2}) Nordstrom, Old Orchard also expanded the mall by 100,000 square feet (9,300 m^{2}) as part of a $200 million expansion. This allowed for an additional 62 stores to open. Following the Nordstrom announcement Old Orchard also announced plans to bring in a fifth tenant: Bloomingdale's. A number of other tenants also underwent renovations, including Crate & Barrel and The Limited. In 1993, Lord & Taylor relocated and expanded its store. Maggiano's Little Italy opened to customers on October 28, 1994. A Barnes & Noble Booksellers also opened that year.

The shopping center was completely redesigned in the 1990s, with the opening of the Nordstrom department store on October 7, 1994 and Bloomingdale's, Abercrombie & Fitch, Ann Taylor, Cache, FAO Schwarz, a new The Limited store, Record Town, Talbots and Victoria's Secret in September 1995. Three months later, Pottery Barn opened to the public. That same year, a five-story parking garage, a food court and a movie theater were added. The Old Orchard Center remained an open-air shopping mall and was not enclosed unlike other malls.

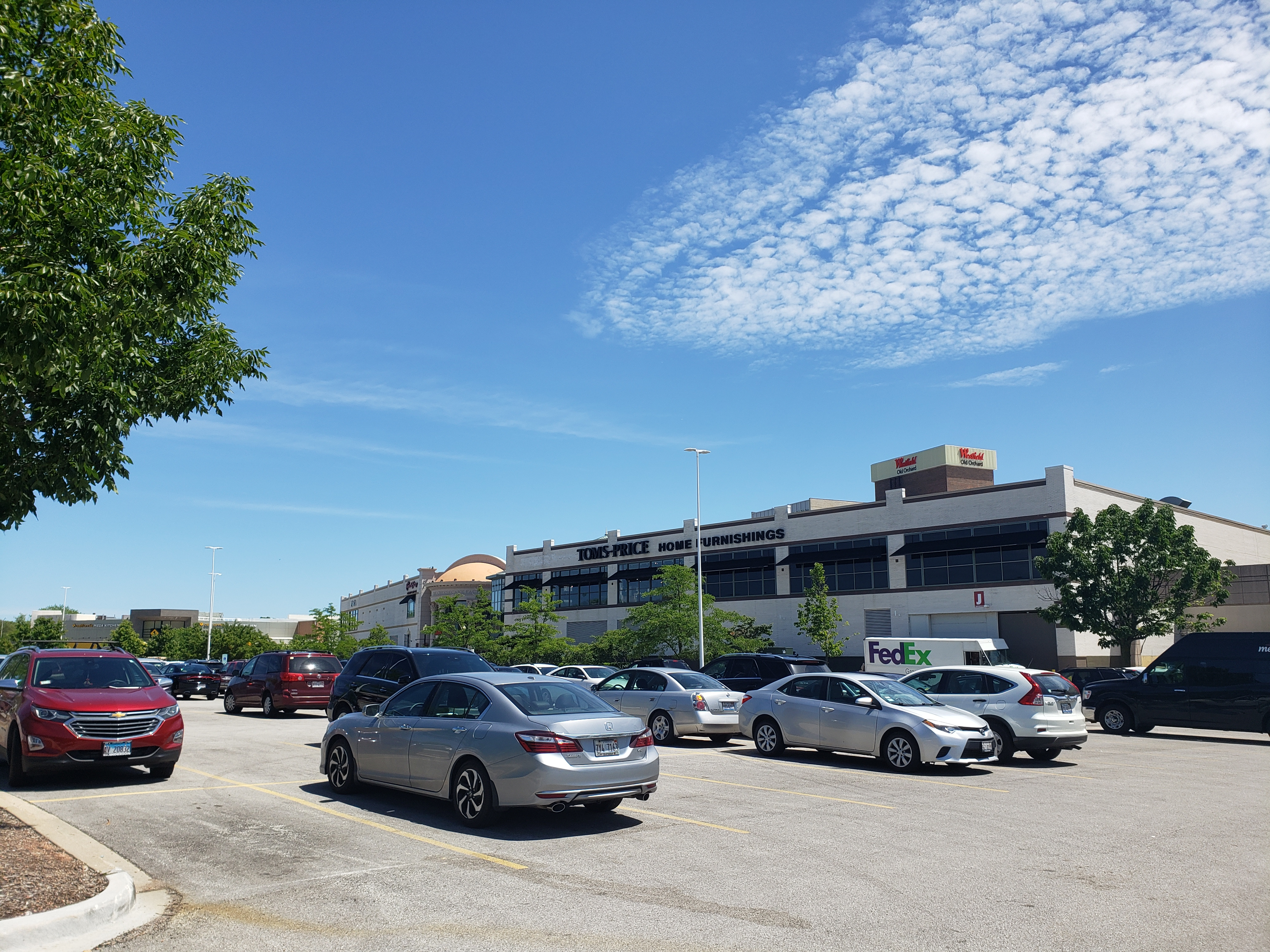
View from the parking lot.

In 2002, Westfield Group purchased the mall, and it was renamed Westfield Shoppingtown Old Orchard. The name was shortened to Westfield Old Orchard in June 2005.

In 2004, Toms Price Furniture opened. In 2005, Foot Locker renovated its store, and Cold Stone Creamery opened. In June 2005, Saks Fifth Avenue closed. It was demolished in 2006, in an effort to scale the mall down. More renovations began during this time. Marshall Field's became Macy's on September 9, 2006.

Old Orchard underwent a $50 million expansion and renovation, and reopened in late 2007. On October 4, 2008, ZARA opened its doors for the first time.

Old Orchard is referenced by name in Mean Girls, which takes place in the North Shore neighborhoods north of the city of Chicago. However, in the film the mall is shown as being an enclosed center. This is because the scenes were actually filmed at Sherway Gardens in Toronto, Ontario, Canada.

In 2014, Uncle Julio's opened to the public. Buffalo Wild Wings opened in 2015. That same year on September 9, Shake Shack would open.

In December 2017, Lord & Taylor announced that they would close their store. The previous Lord & Taylor store is planned for reconstruction as part of a future enhanced development including additional retail, an outdoor plaza, and residences.

In November 2021, Barnes & Noble announced that it would be permanently closing their store in this location after Unibail-Rodamco-Westfield did not renew the store's lease. A year later, Barnes & Noble opened a new store in a new location, formerly occupied by Toms Price Furniture.

In August 2022, it was announced that Bloomingdale's would close their anchor store and open a smaller store format called Bloomie's in the location of the former Barnes & Noble. The previous Bloomingdale’s anchor store will be replaced with about 350 apartments and a town square for events.

By 2023, Westfield Old Orchard announced several new additions, including Psycho Bunny, Tory Burch, Rodd & Gunn, Louis Vuitton, Fabletics, as well as new medical office space. It also announced that the former Lord & Taylor anchor store would be replaced by Arhaus, Puttshack, and a relocation of the existing ZARA store.

An Arhaus, Puttshack, and ZARA have opened in 2024. Development of new residences, restaurants, office buildings, medical spaces, wellness facilities, and outdoor facilities began in 2024 and is expected to be complete in 2026.

== Bus routes ==
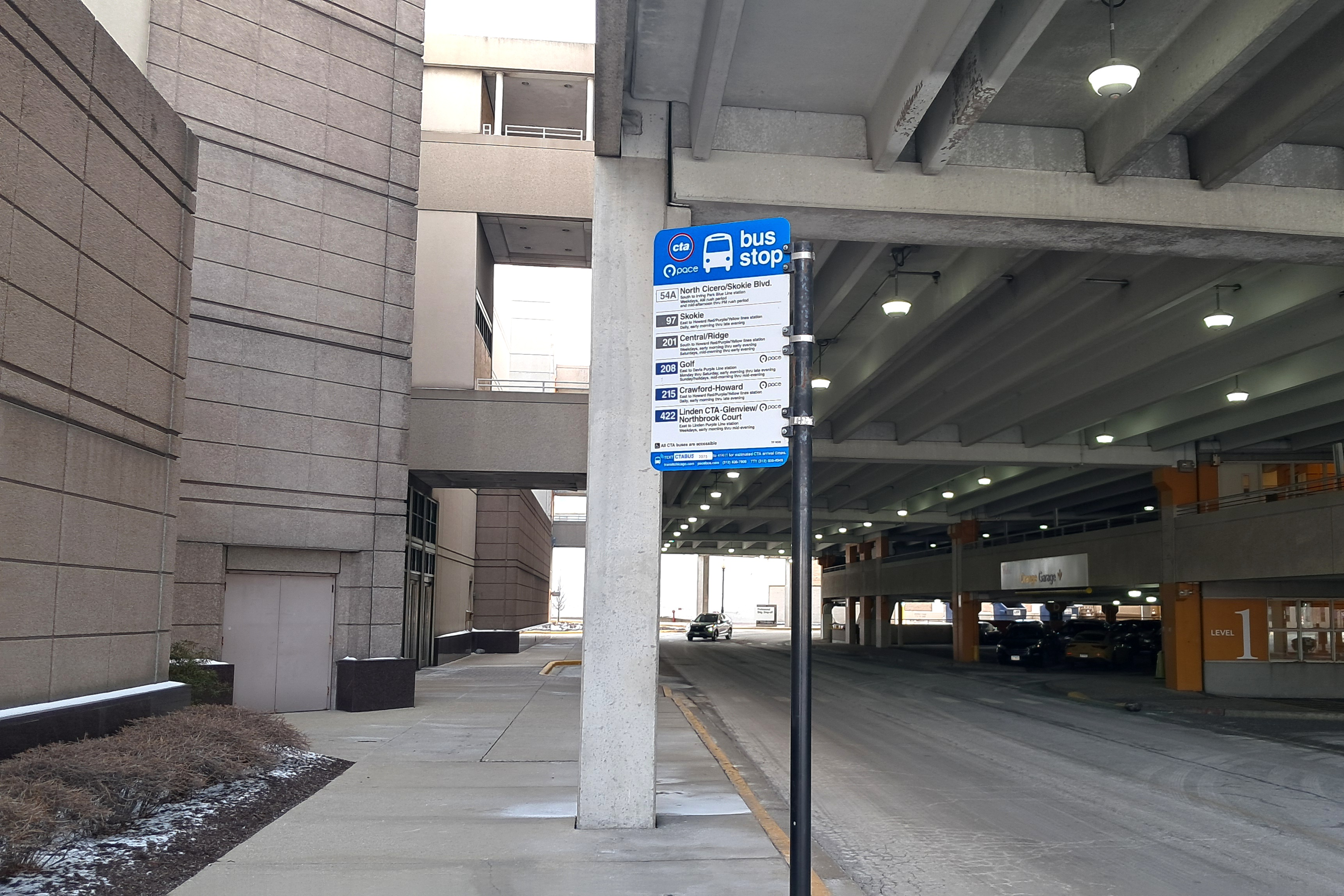
Bus stop at Westfield Old Orchard

CTA

- 54A North Cicero/Skokie Blvd
- 97 Skokie
- 201 Central/Ridge

Pace

- 208 Golf Road
- 215 Crawford/Howard
- 422 Linden CTA/Glenview/Northbrook Court

== See also ==
- Westfield Corporation
