= MainStreet (department store) =

American department store chain

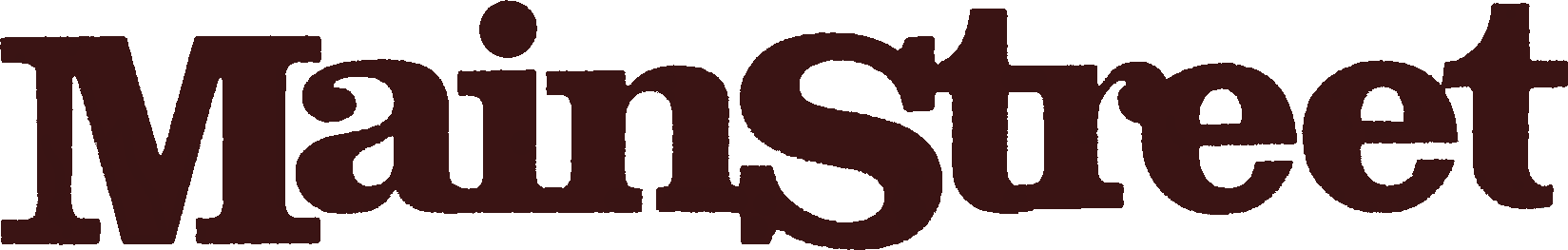
- Type: Subsidiary
- Industry: Retail
- Founded: 1983, Chicago, Illinois, USA
- Defunct: 1989
- Fate: Converted or Sold to Kohl's
- Successor: Kohl's
- Headquarters: Bannockburn, Illinois, USA
- Area served: Chicago metropolitan area, Detroit, Michigan, Grand Rapids, Michigan, Twin Cities, Minnesota
- Products: Clothing, footwear, bedding, furniture, jewelry, beauty products, home electronics, small appliances, housewares
- Parent: Federated Department Stores

MainStreet was a department store chain based in Chicago, Illinois, United States. The chain was launched in November 1983 by Federated Department Stores (now known as Macy's, Inc.). Throughout the 1980s, the chain expanded to twenty-nine stores in Illinois, Michigan, Indiana, and Minnesota. By 1988, MainStreet was sold to the Wisconsin-based chain Kohl's, which converted most MainStreet locations to Kohl's in March 1989.

== History ==
Federated Department Stores, now known as Macy's, Inc., founded the MainStreet chain in 1983 with seven stores in the Chicago, Illinois area. The store was a middle-market chain focused primarily on softlines, similar to Kohl's and Mervyn's. MainStreet stores often featured a "racetrack" layout like a discounter, but checkouts were distributed around the store like a traditional department store. The first locations outside the Chicago area opened around Metro Detroit in 1986.

The MainStreet chain was sold by Campeau Corporation, then-owners of Federated, in order to reduce debts following Campeau's buyout of Federated. Kohl's acquired MainStreet in 1988 for $90 million, and converted them to the Kohl's nameplate in March 1989.

The MainStreet logo remained on a plaza sign in Downers Grove known as "MainStreet Square" well into the 2000s before the sign was eventually replaced with the name kept. It had been previously anchored by a MainStreet, which now is occupied by a Kohl's.
