= Economy of metropolitan Detroit =

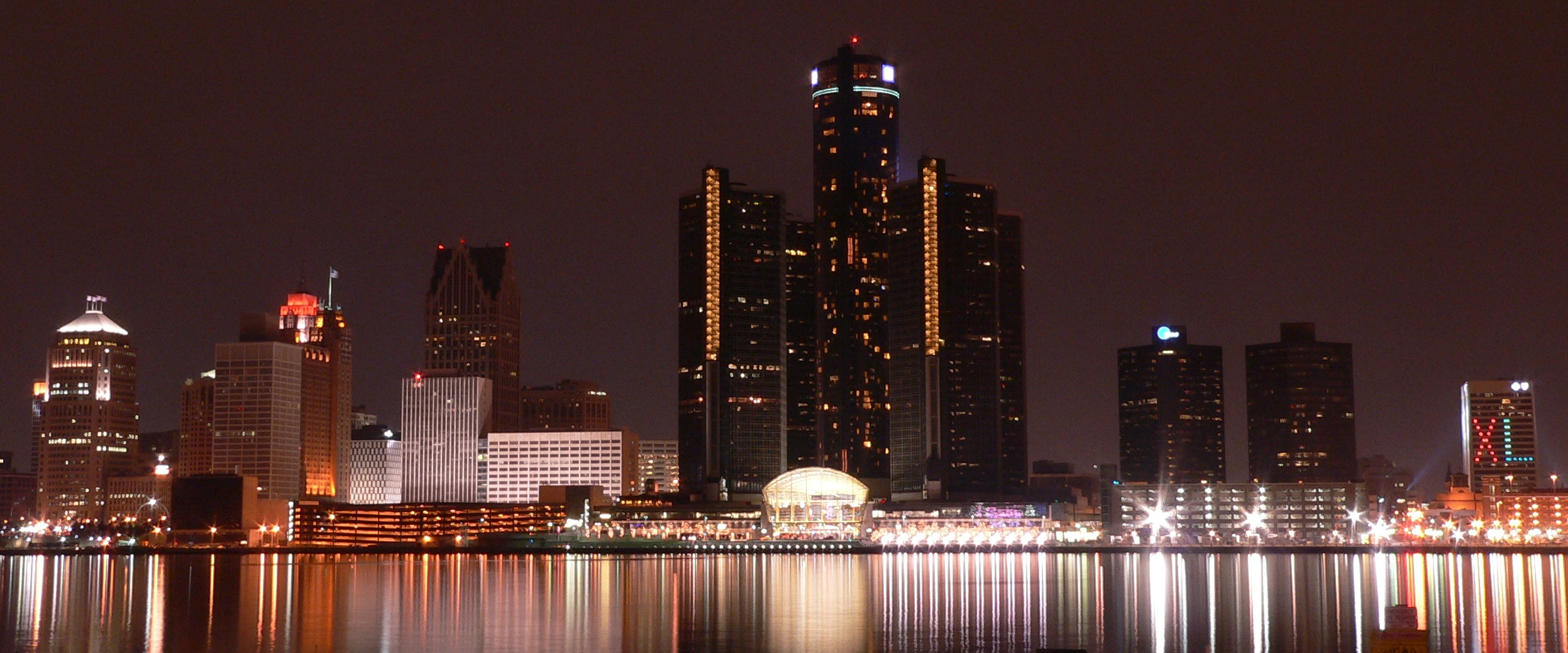
Downtown Detroit

The metropolitan area surrounding and including Detroit, Michigan, is a ten-county area with a population of over 5.9 million, a workforce of 2.6 million, and about 347,000 businesses. Detroit's six-county Metropolitan Statistical Area has a population of about 4.3 million, a workforce of about 2.1 million, and a gross metropolitan product of $200.9 billion. Detroit's urban area has a population of 3.9 million. A 2005 PricewaterhouseCoopers study estimated that Detroit's urban area had a gross domestic product of $203 billion.

About 180,500 people work in downtown Detroit, comprising one-fifth of the city's employment base. Metro Detroit has propelled Michigan's national ranking in emerging technology fields such as life sciences, information technology, and advanced manufacturing; Michigan ranks fourth in the U.S. in high tech employment with 568,000 high tech workers, which includes 70,000 in the automotive industry. Michigan typically ranks third or fourth in overall research and development expenditures in the United States. Metro Detroit is the second-largest source of architectural and engineering job opportunities in the U.S. Detroit is known as the automobile capital of the world, with the domestic auto industry primarily headquartered in Metro Detroit. As of 2003, the Alliance of Automobile Manufacturers claimed that new vehicle production, sales, and jobs related to automobile use account for one of every ten jobs in the United States.

In April 2008, metropolitan Detroit's unemployment rate was 6.9 percent; in November 2012, it was 7.9 percent. Economic issues include the city of Detroit's unemployment rate at 15.8 percent in April 2012. The suburbs typically have low unemployment. The metropolitan economy began an economic recovery in 2010.

== Real estate and corporate location ==
From the metro area economy, Michigan was second in the U.S. in 2004 for in new corporate facilities and expansions. From 1997 to 2004, Michigan was the only state to top the 10,000 mark for the number of major new developments. Among metro areas with more than one million people, Metro Detroit was fourth in the U.S. from 2007 to 2009 for new corporate facilities and expansions. Metro Detroit has one of the nation's largest office markets with 147,880,000 square feet (13,739,000 m^{2}). Major inter-connected office complexes include the 5,500,000 sq ft (510,000 m^{2}) Renaissance Center, the 2,200,000 sq ft (200,000 m^{2}) Southfield Town Center, and the 1,395,000 sq ft (129,600 m^{2}) Cadillac Place joined with the 487,000 sq ft (45,240 m^{2}) Fisher Building in the historic New Center area.

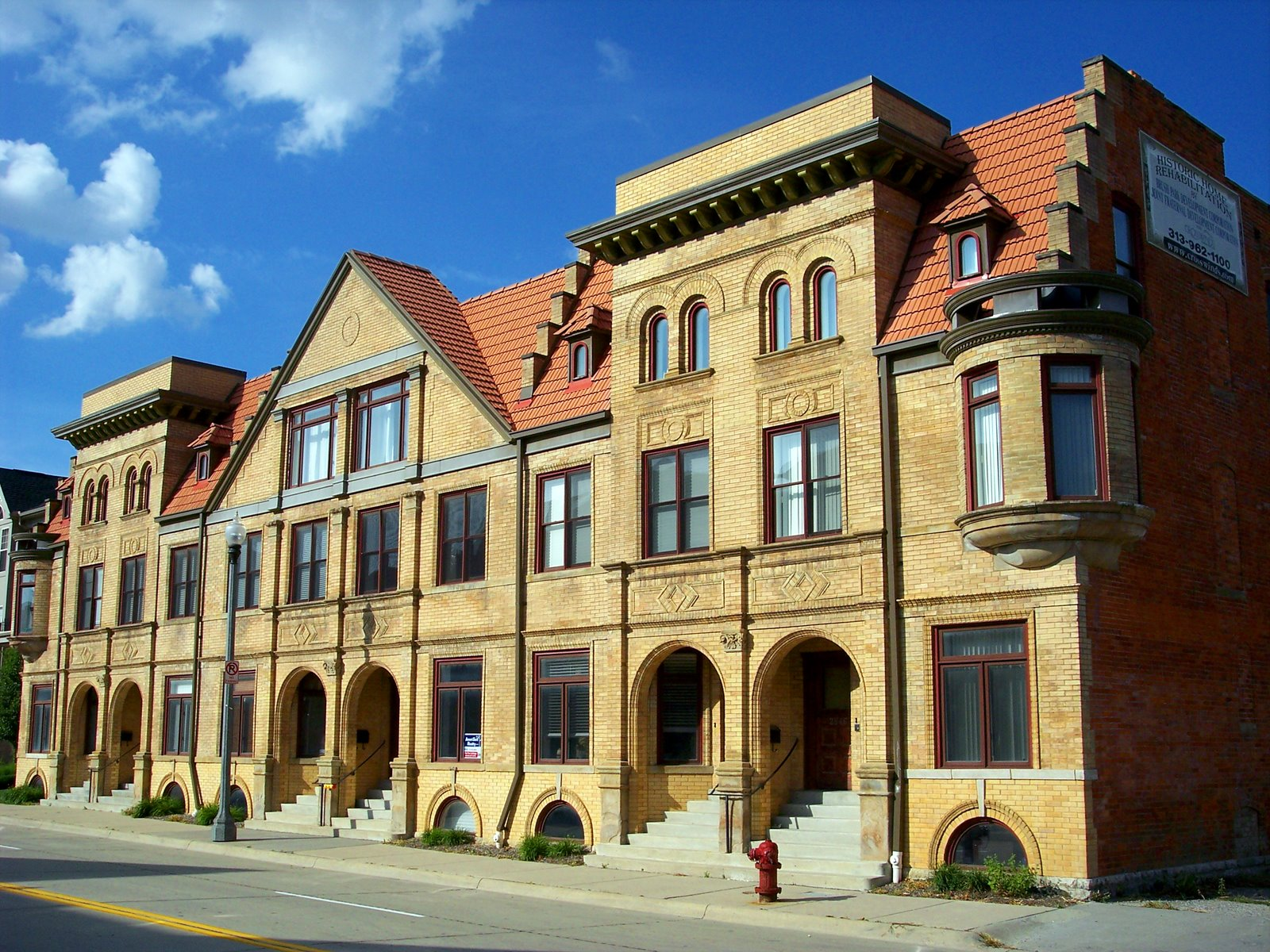
Row houses on John R. Street, renovated as condominiums in 2003

The metro area's resilience has kept the state's economy growing in spite of difficulties. From the third quarter of 2006 to the fourth quarter of 2009, Metro Detroit's residential resale housing market struggled, along with the residential real estate trend across the United States creating opportunities for buyers. The Case–Shiller index projects Metro Detroit as the nation's third strongest housing market by 2014, attracting interest from international investors. Among the top fifty metropolitan areas, Detroit ranked as the third most affordable in the United States in a Forbes 2011 report. Detroit was among the top five cities in the U.S. for job growth from 2010 to 2012. A 2011 economic study showed Metro Detroit with the highest share of employment (13.7%) in the technology sectors in the U.S. The state repealed its business tax in 2011 and replaced it with a 6% corporate income tax which substantially reduced taxes on business. Michigan became the 24th Right to Work state in the U.S. in 2012.

Metro Detroit is home to highly successful real estate developers. Area suburbs are among the more affluent in the U.S. Some of the newer multimillion-dollar estates in the metro area include those of the Turtle Lake development in Bloomfield Hills by Victor International. There are a full range of retail shopping centers from upscale stores to discount chains. In 2007, Bank of America with regional offices in Troy announced that it would commit $25 billion to community development in Michigan.

The Cool Cities Initiative is an innovative reinvestment strategy for America's northern cities begun by Michigan leaders to rebuild inner cities and downtowns. Immigration continues to play a role in the region's projected growth with the population of Detroit-Ann Arbor-Flint (CMSA) estimated to be 6,191,000 by 2025. Cities with existing infrastructure like Detroit are equipped to accommodate future increases in projected U.S. population growth. A 2007 report showed the city of Detroit's average household income at $47,962. Redevelopment of historic buildings is priority for the city.

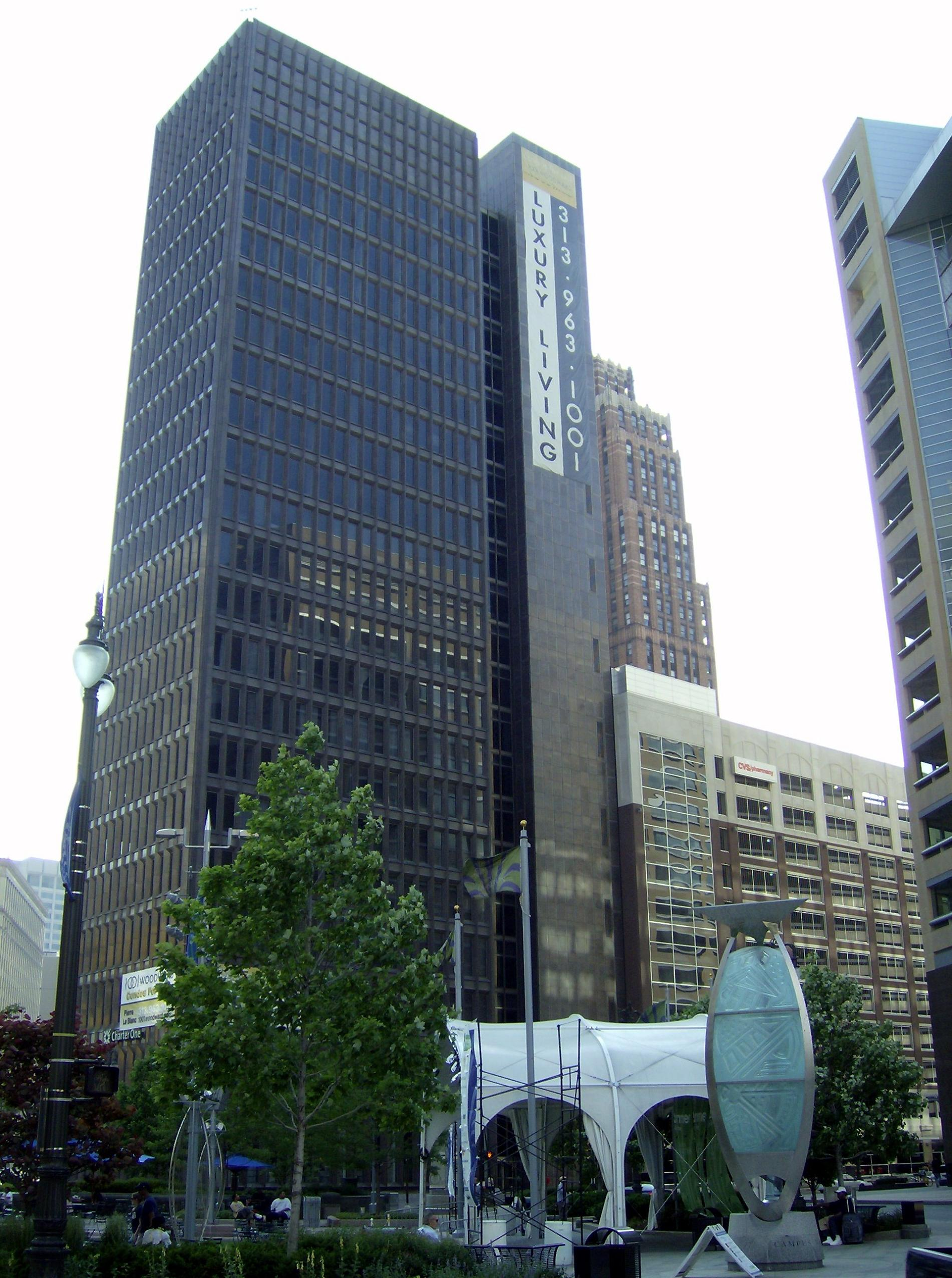
1001 Woodward in Downtown Detroit, redeveloped into high-rise condominiums

OnStar, Ally Financial, Compuware, Quicken Loans, and Blue Cross Blue Shield Association have brought an increased employment base to downtown Detroit. In the decade leading up to 2006, downtown Detroit gained more than $15 billion in new investment from private and public sectors. The Detroit Riverfront conservancy has been able to acquire the $500 million investment for Detroit International Riverfront development through a series of public and private grants to complete the first phase of the five and a half-mile (8.8 km) parkway along the riverfront east from the Hart Plaza and the Renaissance Center to the Belle Isle Bridge with phase II west of Hart Plaza to the Ambassador Bridge. In 2010, Henry Ford Health System and Vanguard Health Systems announced substantial renovations and expansions in New Center and Midtown Detroit.

Lifestyles for rising professionals in Detroit reflect those of other major cities. A 2007 study found that Detroit's new downtown residents are predominantly young professionals (57 percent are ages 25–34, 45 percent have bachelor's degrees, 34 percent have a master's or professional degree). This dynamic is luring many younger residents to the downtown area. Some are choosing to live in the grandiose mansions of Grosse Pointe in order to be closer to the urban scene. The 365-acre (1.48 km^{2}) river east development is a plan investing billions of dollars in a new mixed use residential, commercial, and retail space for downtown Detroit to serve the people where they work and live. To spearhead the development, Michigan created the William G. Milliken State Park and Harbor downtown along the Detroit International Riverfront. In 2007, downtown Detroit was named among the best big city neighborhoods in which to retire by CNN Money editors. In 2008, Troy, Michigan, ranked as the fourth-most affordable U.S. city with a median household income of 78,800. Oakland County is the fourth wealthiest county in the United States among counties with more than one million people.

Redevelopment of the Fort Shelby Hotel and the Westin Book-Cadillac Hotel has spurred economic growth downtown. Cobo Hall convention and exhibit facility, which hosts the North American International Auto Show, has begun a nearly $300 million renovation to be completed in 2014. Development of Detroit's west river area and its Michigan Central Station are the next important challenges for the city.

== Finance ==
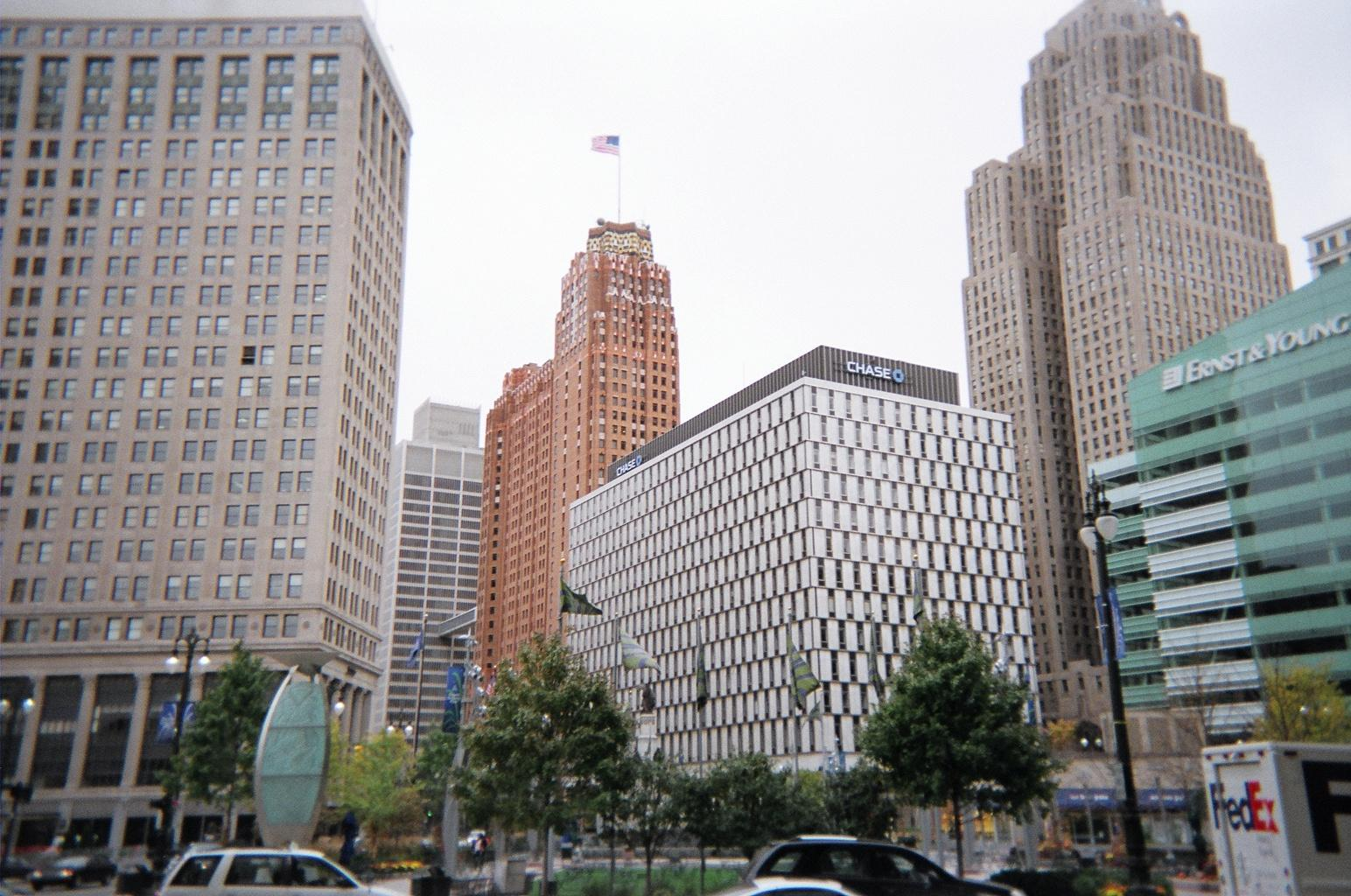
View from Campus Martius Park up Woodward Ave., left to right: The First National Building, One Woodward Avenue, the Guardian, The Qube, Greater Penobscot Building, and One Kennedy Square across from the District.

Metro Detroit is among the top five financial centers in the U.S. having all of the Big Four accounting firms. The area's major financial service employers include Quicken Loans, Ally Financial, Ford Motor Credit Company, Bank of America, Comerica, PNC Financial Services, Fifth Third Bank, JP Morgan Chase, GE Capital, TD Auto Finance, Deloitte Touche, KPMG, Ernst & Young, PricewaterhouseCoopers, Baker Tilly, Plante Moran, Robert Half International, and Raymond James.

Financial and investment executives have diverse employment opportunities in metropolitan Detroit. Ally Financial, headquartered at Tower 200 of the Renaissance Center, is among the largest holders of mortgages in the United States. Detroit-based Quicken Loans is the fifth-largest retail home mortgage lender in the U.S. and the largest online. The metropolitan area has a range of venture capital firms which finance business start-ups and acquisitions. General Motors invests its $85 billion pension trust, providing funding to the area. Detroit's historic Penobscot Building in the downtown financial district is in the heart of the city's wireless Internet zone and fiber-optic network.

Fifth Third Bank, which maintains its regional headquarters at tower 1000 of the Southfield Town Center, announced a $100 million expansion in the Metro Detroit area in order to take market share from Dallas-based rival Comerica, which also maintains a large presence in Michigan. Fifth Third announced it would create 350 new jobs in the area and open 30 to 40 new branches.

In 2009, Quicken Loans more than doubled its mortgage volume from the previous year to $25 billion, experiencing significant growth in market share. In 2010, Quicken began a new division within the company to provide mortgage services to community banks nationwide. In 2011, Quicken Loans relocated its headquarters to downtown Detroit, consolidating about 4,000 of its suburban employees in a move considered to be a high importance to city planners to reestablish the historic downtown. In 2011, Blue Cross Blue Shield of Michigan consolidated 6,000 of its employees in downtown Detroit, relocating 3,000 to Tower 500 and 600 of the Renaissance Center from Southfield.

== Information technology ==
Metro Detroit accounts for the State's national ranking in emerging technology fields such as life sciences, information technology, and advanced manufacturing; Metro Detroit's technology sector is fifth in the U.S. for total employment and fourth in the percent of employment concentrated within the sector. In 2010, the Detroit area became the fastest growing region in the U.S. for high technology jobs. Downtown Detroit maintains a wireless Internet zone and has seen an influx of information technology jobs. A report by the Silicon Valley–based TechNet group found Michigan to be the leading state for stimulating demand for broadband, positioning it during the early 2000s. The Michigan Information Technology Center provides education, support services, and conferencing facilities for the region's information technology companies. The metro area is home to high tech business incubators such as the Michigan Security Network, a consortium which coordinates business growth of cybersecurity, biodefense, and border security sectors.

Some of the metro area's information technology and software companies with a major presence or headquarters include Compuware, HP Enterprise Services, IBM, Google, General Electric, Unisys, Fiserv, Covansys, and ProQuest. HP Enterprise Services makes Metro Detroit its regional headquarters and one of its largest global employment locations. On June 26, 2009, General Electric announced that it will create software at a new advanced manufacturing and technology center in Van Buren Township. Comcast and Verizon maintain a large presence in the area. OnStar, based in the Renaissance Center is also a source of growth. Chrysler's largest corporate facility is its U.S. headquarters and technology center in the Detroit suburb of Auburn Hills. VisionIT and Kelly IT Resources are other large employers headquartered in the metro area filling a wide range of needs. Five of the world's twenty largest employers began in Metro Detroit.

On June 30, 2015, Quicken Loans announced the opening of its new state-of-the-art, 66,000-square-foot Technical Center in Corktown. The new facility will feature two 10,000-square-foot server rooms in addition to training, office, meeting, and technical support space. Half of the data center including one server room will be occupied by the Quicken Loans' technology team. An equal-sized 33,000 square foot portion of the building, including the second 10,000 square-foot server room, is available for lease.

== Higher education and research ==
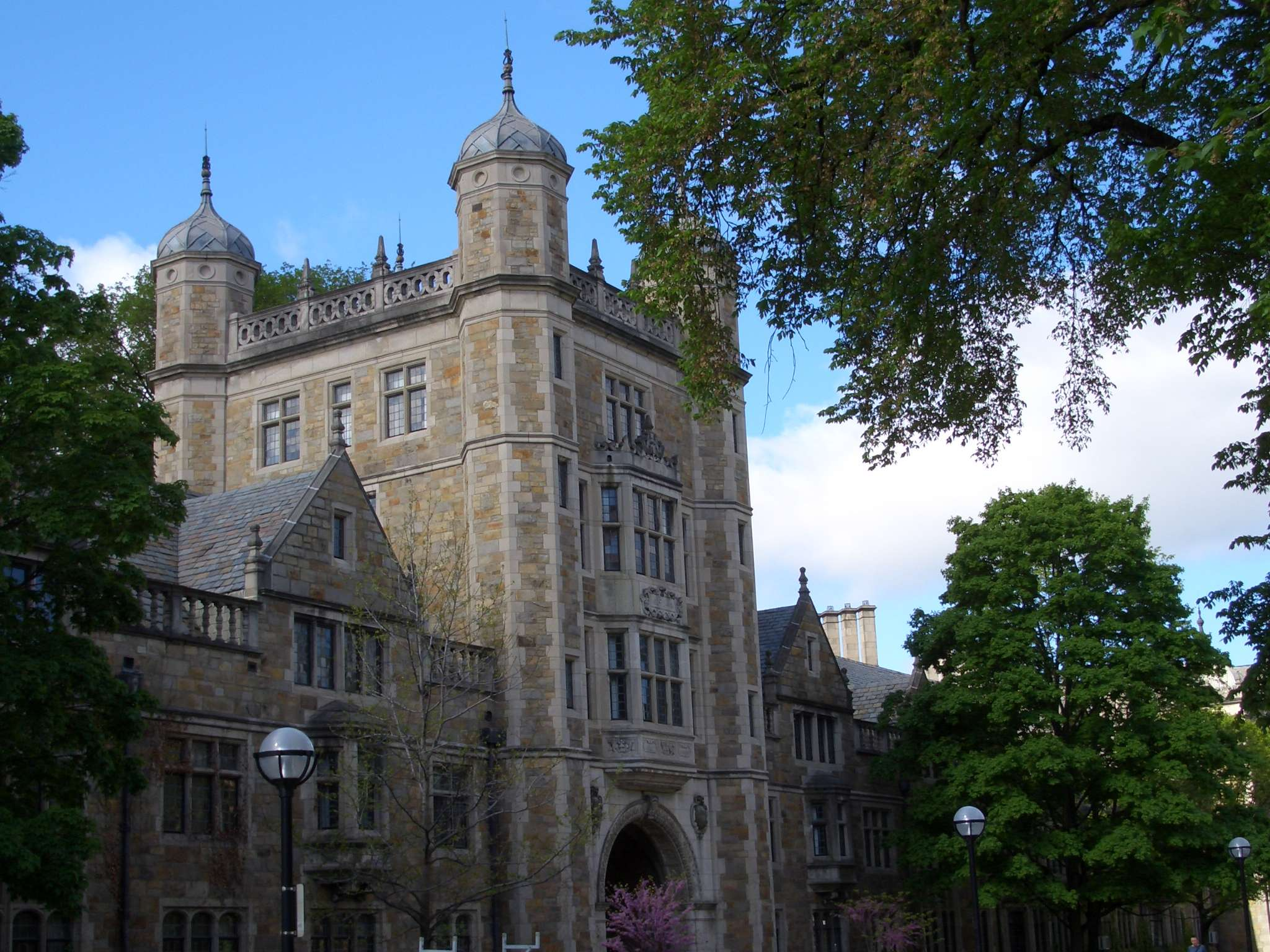
The Lawyers Club at the University of Michigan in Ann Arbor

Metro Detroit has diversified its economic base though initiatives in emerging technologies. Michigan typically ranks third or fourth in overall Research & development (R&D) expenditures in the United States. In 2011, Detroit received the first U.S. Patent and Trademark Office outside the Washington, D.C. area. Metro area universities provide a source of top talent for the region. The University of Michigan in Ann Arbor is one of the world's leading research institutions and is among the highly ranked institutions in the U.S. The University of Michigan schools of engineering, medicine, business, and law are consistently among the top-ranked in the United States. In 2002, the state constructed the NextEnergy Center just north of Wayne State University to focus on fuel cell development and alternative energy.

The area is home to many post-secondary institutions of higher learning and research, including: Baker College, Carnegie Institute, Cleary University, Cranbrook Educational Community, Eastern Michigan University, Lawrence Technological University, Oakland University, Thomas M Cooley Law School-Rochester, Walsh College, Rochester College, Madonna University, Marygrove College, University of Detroit Mercy, the University of Michigan, and Wayne State University.

On the Canadian side of the border, Windsor's two post-secondary institutions have partnered with auto makers to open high tech research and training facilities. The University of Windsor is home to the University of Windsor/DaimlerChrysler Canada Automotive Research and Development Centre. St. Clair College has the Ford Centre for Excellence in Manufacturing.

== Health care and biomedical ==
Metro Detroit area is one of the leading health care economies in the U.S. according to a 2003 study measuring health care industry components, with the region's hospital sector ranking fourth in the nation. A 2006 economic impact report showed that the metropolitan region supported 245,379 direct health care jobs with an additional 120,408 indirect and induced jobs. Major health system networks in the region include the University of Michigan, Henry Ford, Beaumont, Detroit Medical Center, St. John, Oakwood, St. Joseph, Karmanos Cancer Center, and the John D. Dingell and Ann Arbor Veterans Affairs Medical Centers.

Beginning in 2010, Oakland University in Rochester opened Michigan's fourth medical school in a partnership with Beaumont Hospitals. The school will boost the region's economy with jobs in the life sciences, research, clinical trials, and doctors Wayne State University in Detroit has the largest single-campus medical school in the United States, and the nation's fourth largest medical school overall. Detroit Medical Center formally became a part of Vanguard Health Systems on December 30, 2010, as a for-profit corporation. Vanguard has agreed to invest nearly $1.5 billion in the Detroit Medical Center complex which will include $417 million to retire debts, at least $350 million in capital expenditures and an additional $500 M for new capital investment.

In January 2009, the University of Michigan established the North Campus Research Complex through its purchase of the former Pfizer research facility with 30 buildings on 174 acres (0.70 km^{2}) in Ann Arbor in order to create about 2,000 jobs through establishing commercial partnerships. The Community Foundation of Southeast Michigan administers $100 M of private foundation grants for the regions New Economy Initiative to spur investment in a variety of metro area projects. A BioEnterprise Midwest Healthcare Venture report found that the Detroit - Ann Arbor region attracted $312 M in new biotechnology venture capital investments from 2006 to 2009.

In 2012, two major construction projects were begun in New Center, the Henry Ford Health System started the first phase of its South Campus site, a $500 million, 300-acre revitalization project, with the construction of a new $30 million, 275,000-square-foot, Medical Distribution Center for Cardinal Health, Inc. and Wayne State University started construction on a new $93 million, 207,000-square-foot, Integrative Biosciences Center (IBio). As many as 500 researchers, and staff will work out of the IBio Center.

== Manufacturing and industry ==
Top publicly traded companies in Metro Detroit according to revenues with metro and U.S. rankings
| Metro rank | Corporation | US rank |
| 1 | General Motors | 6 |
| 2 | Ford | 7 |
| 3 | Dow | 38 |
| 4 | Aptiv | 121 |
| 5 | Ally | 147 |
| 6 | TRW Automotive | 169 |
| 7 | Lear | 195 |
| 8 | Penske Automotive | 225 |
| 9 | Masco | 277 |
| 10 | Visteon | 282 |
| 11 | DTE Energy | 285 |
| 12 | Meritor | 346 |
| 13 | CMS Energy | 369 |
| 14 | Autoliv | 376 |
| 15 | Pulte Homes | 393 |
| 16 | Kelly Services | 437 |
| 17 | BorgWarner | 453 |
| 18 | Cooper Standard | 814 |
| 19 | Valassis | 809 |
| 20 | Affinia Group | 853 |
| 21 | American Axle | 874 |
Source: Fortune; See also: List of Michigan companies

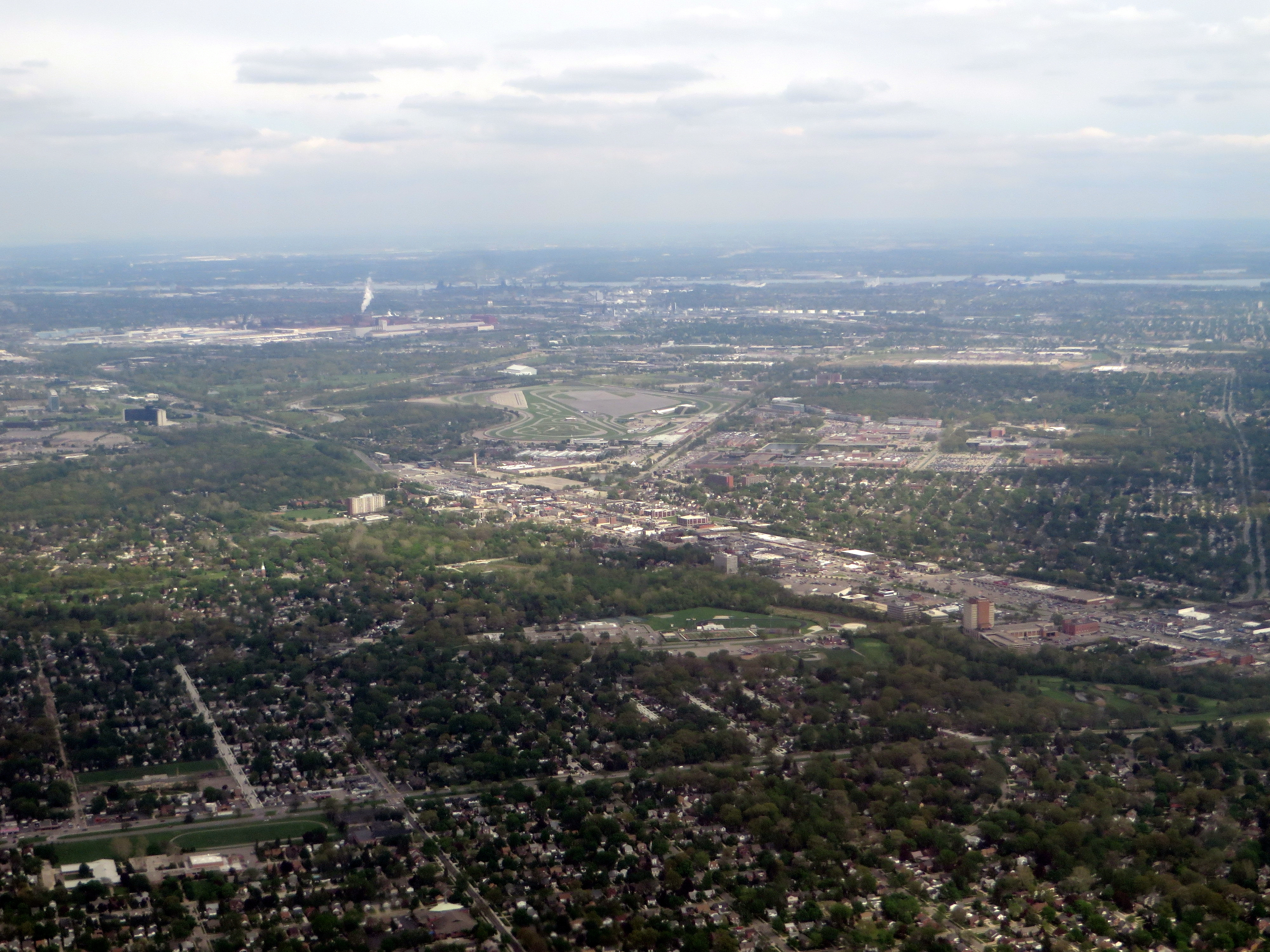
Ford Dearborn Proving Ground (DPG), completed major reconstruction and renovations in 2006.

As the world's traditional automotive center, Metro Detroit is headquarters to America's "Big Three" automakers, General Motors, Ford Motor Company, and Chrysler. Virtually every major global automaker has a presence in the area including technology and design centers. Oakland County's "Automation Alley" has over 1,800 of world's advanced technology companies with Metro Detroit ranking fifth in the U.S. in technology sector employment. There are about 4,000 factories in the area. The automotive headquarters for the Society of Automotive Engineers (SAE) is in the suburb of Troy. OnStar and Ally Financial are a source for growth.

In spite of foreign competition for market share, Detroit's automakers have continued to gain volume from previous decades with the expansion of the American and global automotive markets. Manufacturing in the state grew 6.6% from 2001 to 2006, In 2008, an economic and financial crisis impacted global auto industry sales. For 2010, the domestic automakers reported significant profits indicating the beginning of rebound. The sales revenue from just one of Detroit's automakers exceeds the combined total for all of the top companies in many major U.S. cities. A Center for Automotive Research (CAR) study estimated that tax revenue generated by the automotive industry in the United States for a single year, 2010, amounted to $91.5 billion in state and local tax revenue and additional $43 billion in federal tax revenue.

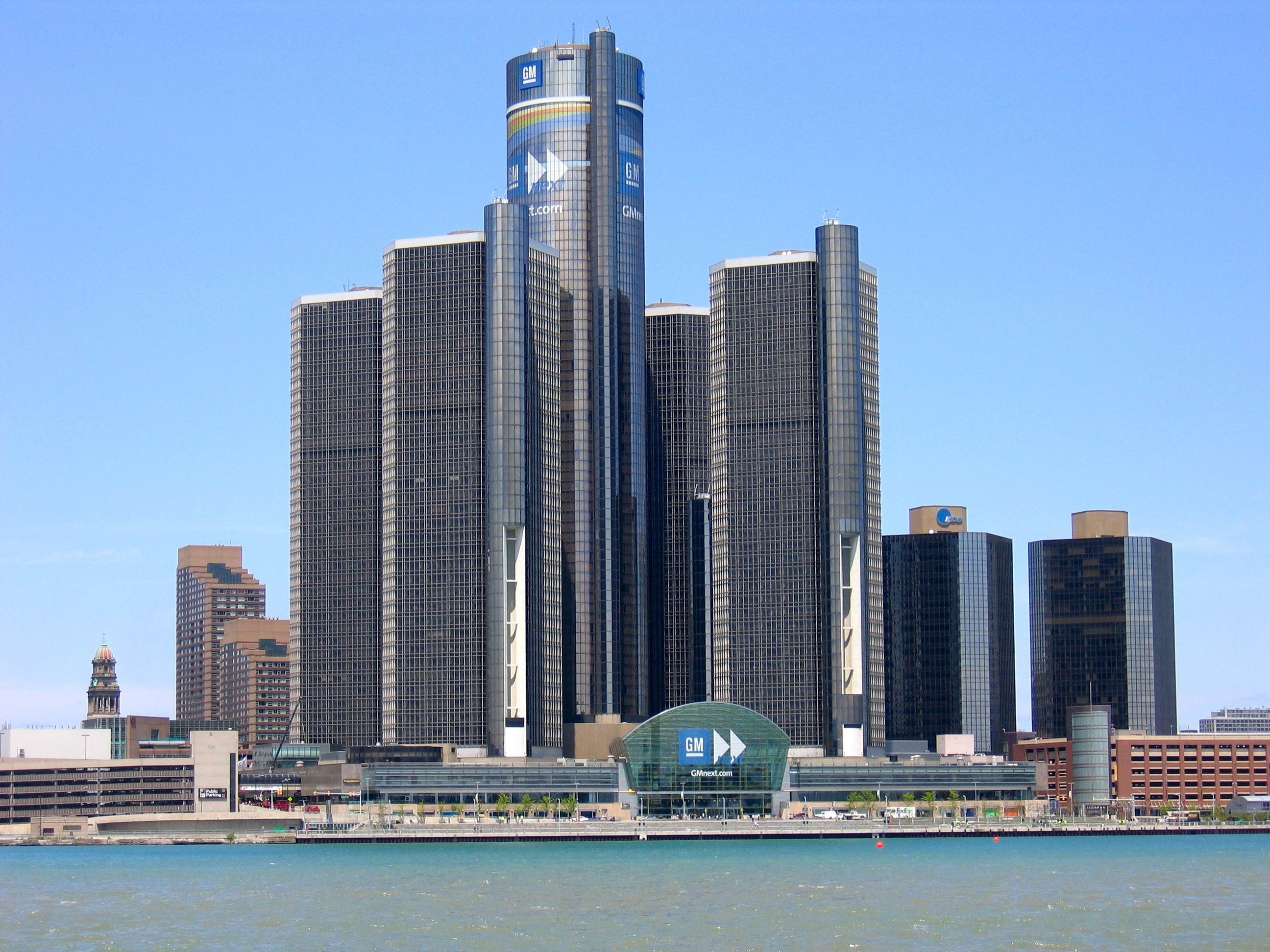
The Renaissance Center is the headquarters of General Motors.

The area includes a variety of manufacturers and is an important component of U.S. national security. United States Army TACOM Life Cycle Management Command (TACOM) is headquartered in Metro Detroit together with Selfridge Air National Guard Base. The region has important defense contractors such as General Dynamics. The area is home to Rofin-Sinar, a leading maker of lasers which are used for industrial processes. Advanced robotics is another important segment in the metro area. On June 27, 2009, General Electric announced plans to build a new $100 M center for advanced manufacturing technology and software, in Van Buren Township in Wayne County, expected to employ 1,200 people providing a pay range of $100,000 per year. Dow Chemical is a significant company in the metro region. The metro region's large energy producers include DTE and CMS.

Labor force distribution in Detroit by category: Construction Manufacturing Trade, transportation, utilities Information Finance Professional and business services Education and health services Leisure and hospitality Other services Government

With its major port status, the city's infrastructure accommodates heavy industry. Marathon Oil Company maintains a large refinery in Detroit, expanded to refine oil sands from Canada. Lafarge's cement distribution facility constructed at the city's Springwells Industrial Park in 2005 includes North America's largest cement silo.

Detroit's automakers are building vehicles like the Chevrolet Volt flex fuel hybrid and Buick LaCrosse e-assist hybrid. In 2006, Ford announced a dramatic increase in production of its hybrid gas-electric models, Ford and GM have also promoted E-85 ethanol capable flexible-fuel vehicles as a viable alternative to gasoline. General Motors has invested heavily in all fuel cell-equipped vehicles, while Chrysler is focusing much of its research and development into biodiesel. Two days after the September 11, 2001, attacks, GM announced it had developed the world's most powerful fuel cell stack capable of powering large commercial vehicles. In 2002, the state of Michigan established NextEnergy, a non-profit corporation whose purpose is to enable commercialization of various energy technologies, especially hydrogen fuel cells. Its main complex is located north of Wayne State University. In August 2009, Michigan and Detroit's auto industry received $1.36 B in grants from the U.S. Department of Energy for the manufacture of lithium-ion batteries which are expected to generate 6,800 immediate jobs and employ 40,000 in the state by 2020.

On quality, Cadillac outscored all other luxury automakers in two of three quality surveys by AutoPacific, Strategic Vision, and J.D. Power in 2003. Ford led all other automakers in the 2007 J.D. Initial Quality survey.

== Trade ==
The Greater Detroit Foreign Trade Zone (GDFTZ) was created in 1981 through the U.S. Department of Commerce to allow for the reduction of taxes across borders and to attract, retain and facilitate international trade In 2011, Metro Detroit ranked as the fourth largest export market in the United States. Infrastructure is an important component in the metro area economy. Detroit has an extensive toll-free expressway system which, together with its status as a major port city, provide advantages to its location as a global business center. There are no toll roads in Michigan.

Metro Detroit is the country's number-one exporting region and busiest commercial port. Detroit is at the center of the Great Lakes Megalopolis. The Ambassador Bridge is the busiest commercial border crossing in North America, carrying 27 percent of the total trade between the U.S. and Canada. More than fifteen million people and ten million vehicles cross the Ambassador Bridge and the Detroit-Windsor Tunnel annually. A 2004 Border Transportation Partnership study showed that 150,000 jobs in the Detroit-Windsor region and $13 billion in annual production depend on Detroit's international border crossing. The Detroit River International Crossing project calls for a second bridge to be built across the Detroit River to facilitate increased trade and ease of travel.

Many people commute across the Detroit-Windsor international border daily. Professions identified in the Canada–United States Free Trade Agreement which began in 1988 are permitted TN Visas for legal work in the United States and Canada, creating freedom of labor movement. TN status is recognized in the North American Free Trade Agreement (NAFTA) which began in 1994. As an example, a large number of nurses in Detroit hospitals also live in Windsor. The 710-mile (1,140 km) Quebec City–Windsor Corridor contains over 18 million people, with 51 percent of the Canadian population and three out of the four largest metropolitan areas in Canada, according to the 2001 Census. Headquartered in Detroit, the international law firm of Miller, Canfield, Paddock & Stone P.L.C., is one of the largest in the United States. Metro area business leaders belong to the Detroit Economic Club, headquartered at 211 West Fort Street. The U.S. dollar is readily accepted as currency in Windsor.

== Transportation ==
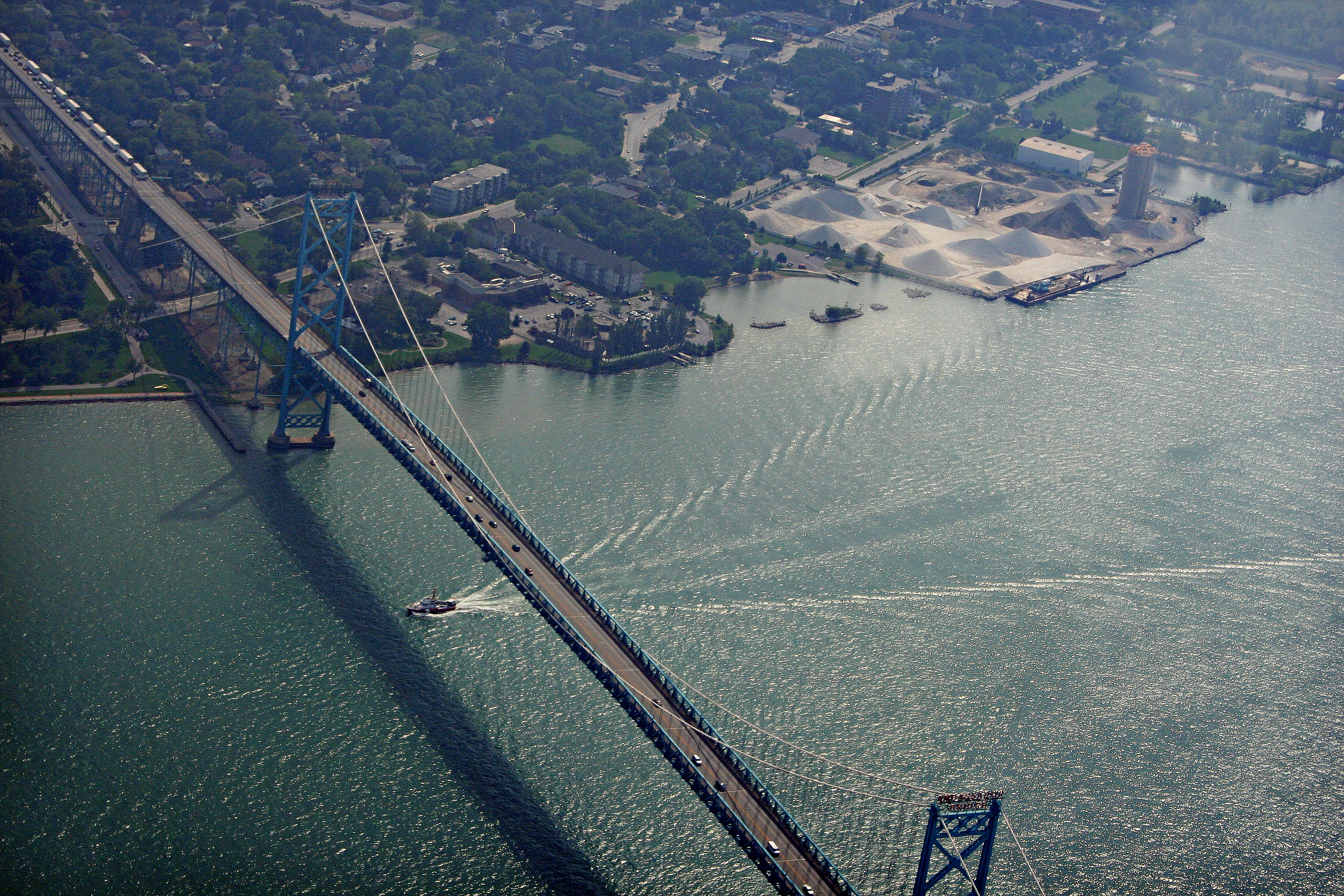
The Ambassador Bridge, a suspension bridge that connects Detroit with Windsor, Ontario, in Canada. It is the busiest international border crossing in North America in terms of trade volume.

Metro Detroit offers a comprehensive system of transit services for the central city and region. The Michigan Department of Transportation (MDOT) administers the advanced network of freeways in metropolitan Detroit and Michigan. The region offers mass transit with bus services provided jointly by the Detroit Department of Transportation (DDOT) and the Suburban Mobility Authority for Regional Transportation (SMART) through a cooperative service and fare agreement. Cross border service between the downtown areas of Windsor and Detroit is provided by Transit Windsor via the Tunnel Bus. A monorail system, known as the People Mover, operates daily through a 2.9 mile (4.6 km) loop in the downtown area. Amtrak provides service to Detroit, operating its Wolverine service between Chicago, Illinois, and Pontiac. Greyhound Bus provides nationwide service to Detroit with its station on Howard Street near Michigan Avenue. A proposed SEMCOG Commuter Rail service could link Ann Arbor, Detroit Metropolitan Airport, Ypsilanti, The Henry Ford, Dearborn, and Detroit's New Center Amtrak station.

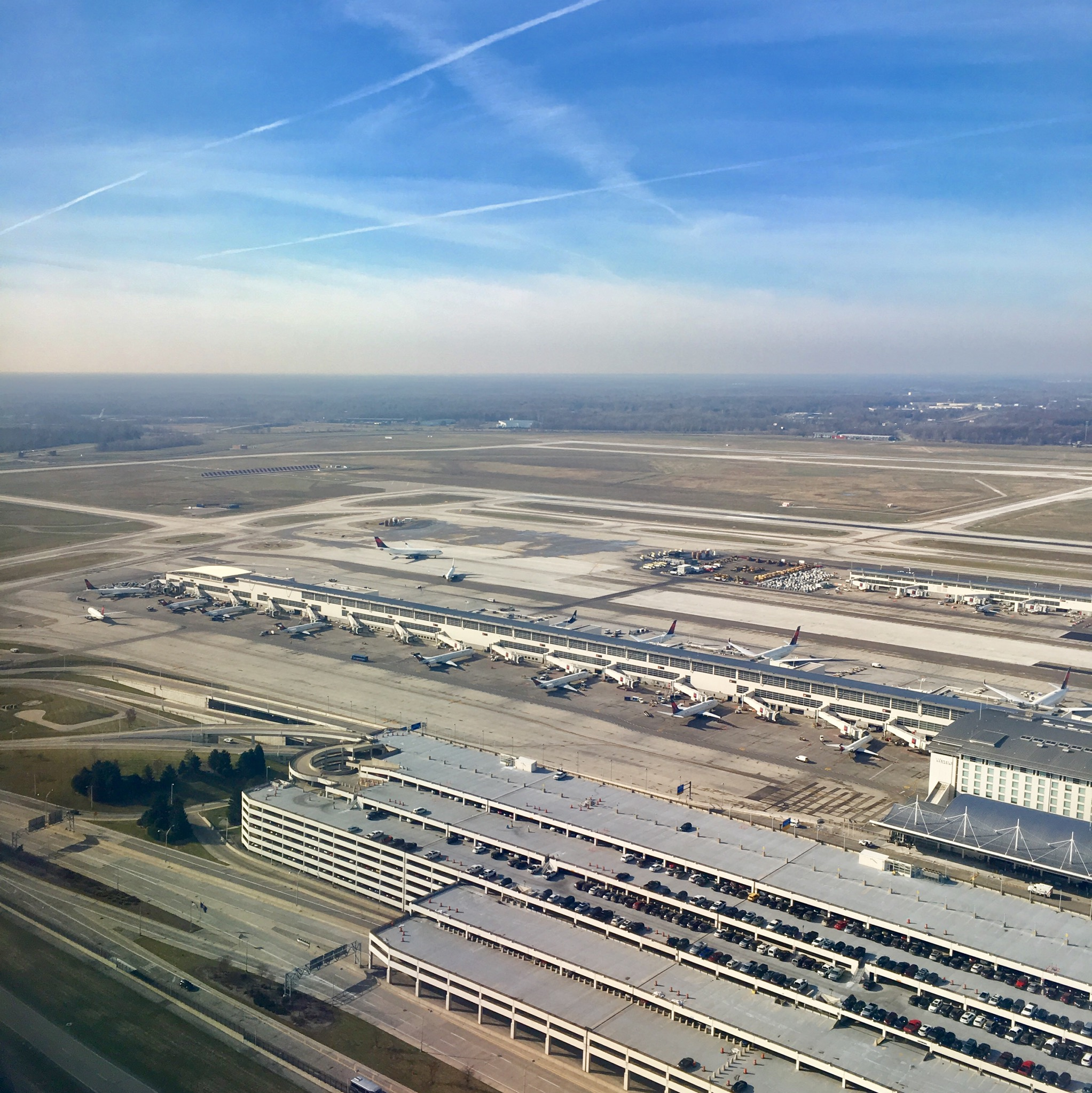
Aerial of Detroit Metro Airport (DTW), one of the largest air traffic hubs in the US

As a major U.S. port, Detroit is an important center for transportation and logistics employment including its aviation, rail, truck, and ship docking facilities. Detroit maintains a cruise ship dock and passenger terminal on Hart Plaza adjacent to the Renaissance Center. Commercial vessels dock at Michigan's 38 deep water ports which provide access to the Great Lakes Waterway and the Saint Lawrence Seaway. Detroit Metropolitan Airport (DTW) is one of America's largest and most recently modernized facilities, with six major runways, Boeing 747 maintenance facilities, and an attached Westin Hotel and Conference Center. Located in nearby Romulus, DTW is metro Detroit's principal airport and is a hub for Delta Air Lines and Spirit Airlines. Bishop International Airport in Flint and Toledo Express Airport in Toledo, Ohio, are other commercial passenger airports. Coleman A. Young International Airport (DET), commonly called Detroit City Airport, is on Detroit's northeast side, and offers charter service. Willow Run Airport in Ypsilanti is for commercial aviation. One economic development strategy proposed is an Aerotropolis, a concept utilizing Detroit Metropolitan Airport as a central business district. Detroit Renaissance, now known as Business Leaders for Michigan, announced an eleven-point strategy to transform the region's economy which includes development of the Aerotropolis.

The U.S. Department of Transportation has awarded $244 million in grants for high-speed rail upgrades between Chicago and Detroit. A consortium of investors including the Canadian Pacific Railway has proposed a new larger rail tunnel to accommodate large double stacked freight cars under the Detroit River which could open in 2015. With the new tunnel potentially emerging near the Michigan Central Station, a redeveloped station could play a role as a trade inspection facility.

== Tourism ==
Tourism in metropolitan Detroit is an important economic factor, comprising nine percent of the area's two million jobs. About 15.9 million people visit the area annually spending an estimated $4.8 B. Besides casino gaming, the region's leading attraction is The Henry Ford, America's largest indoor-outdoor museum complex. The Detroit International Riverfront links the Renaissance Center to a series of venues, parks, restaurants, and hotels by a riverfront walkway.

The region hosts large multi-day events with crowds of hundreds of thousands to over three million people for annual events such as the Windsor-Detroit International Freedom Festival, the North American International Auto Show, and the Motown Winter Blast on Campus Martius Park. The city's Midtown and New Center areas anchored by Wayne State University attract millions of visitors each year to its museums and cultural centers; for example, the Detroit Festival of the Arts in Midtown draws about 350,000 people. Mall developers consider the metro area's Somerset Collection to be among the nation's top privately held mall properties with 2004 gross annual sales of about $600 M and sales per square foot at $620 compared to the national average of $341.

The area has hosted several major sporting events such as Super Bowl XL; in fact, Detroit is the only northern city to have hosted two Super Bowls. Ford Field hosted the 2009 NCAA Final Four; in April 2007 it hosted WrestleMania 23. Major League Baseball's 2005 All-Star Game was held at Comerica Park, as were 2006 World Series games due to the Detroit Tigers success. Metro Detroit is one of thirteen U.S. cities with teams from four major sports.

The area's 24,000-acre (97 km^{2}) network of Huron-Clinton Metroparks receives about nine million visitors annually. About 5.9 million people live in the Detroit–Windsor region, making it one of the largest metropolitan areas in North America. An estimated 46 million people live within a 300-mile (480 km) radius of Metro Detroit. Thus, the metro area has many opportunities for growth in tourism with great potential for development and expansion. The region's abundance of natural lakes and coastal landscape present investment potential for beachfront resorts and luxury high rise condominiums. In addition, there is the Detroit River International Wildlife Refuge which is the only international wildlife preserve in North America, uniquely located in the heart of a major metropolitan area. The refuge includes islands, coastal wetlands, marshes, shoals, and waterfront lands along 48 miles (77 km) of the Detroit River and Western Lake Erie shoreline.

The city of Detroit functions as an entertainment hub for the entire region, as casino resorts, major sports venues, and theatre district increase development prospects for new retail. Detroit is the largest American city and metropolitan region to offer casino resort hotels. The MGM Grand Detroit (2007), Motor City Casino (2008), Caesars Windsor (2007), and Hollywood Casino (2008) comprise the regions four major casino resorts.

Movie studios in metro area help to establish the state as a legitimate contender in the 12-month-a-year film business. Motown Motion Picture Studios (2009) with 535,000 square feet (49,700 m^{2}) will produce movies at the Pontiac Centerpoint Business Campus for a film industry expected to employ over 4,000 people in the metro area.

== Retail ==
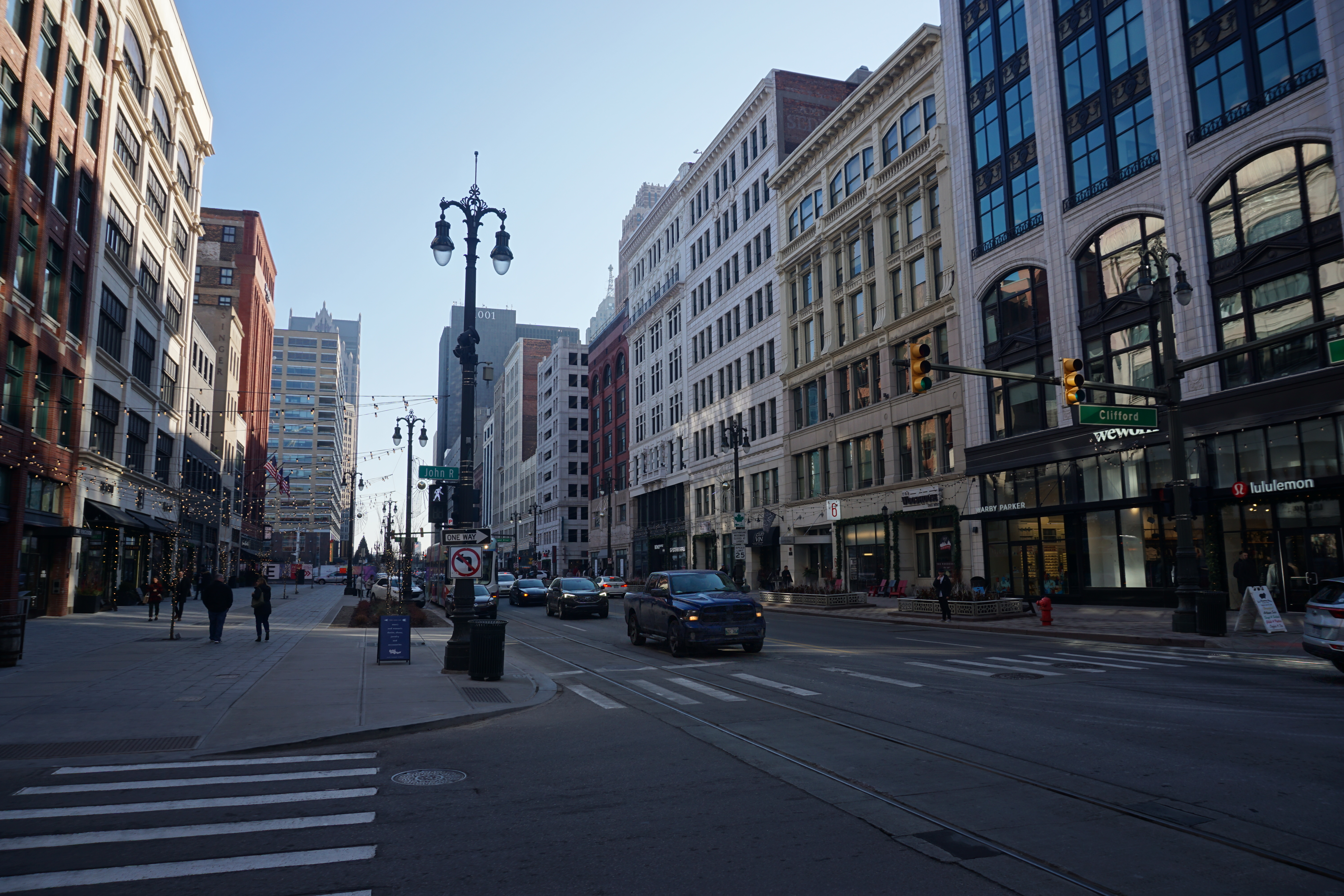
Merchant's row on lower Woodward Avenue

Metro Detroit has many chain retailers and super regional shopping malls, in both upscale and outlet style venues, which, in addition to the "land" malls of Southland Center in Taylor, Eastland Center in Harper Woods, and Westland Center in Westland (Southfield's Northland Center closed in 2015), are located throughout other suburban municipalities such as Troy, Novi, Auburn Hills, Sterling Heights, and Dearborn. In the 2000s, some older malls closed, while some inner-ring suburban malls have been remodeled. Others have a new role with "big box" establishments. During the same decade, upscale lifestyle centers appeared in Detroit suburbs, most notably The Mall at Partridge Creek in Clinton Township. Several suburban municipalities, including Birmingham, Royal Oak, Rochester, and Grosse Pointe, contain their own street-side shopping districts.

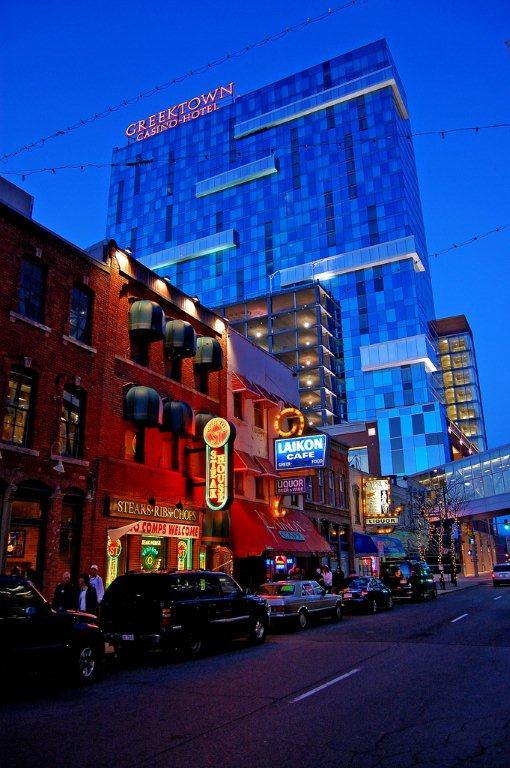
Merchant's row along Monroe Street, Greektown Historic District

Many local merchants and restaurants are located within the Detroit city-limits including Lower Woodward Avenue Historic District, Greektown Historic District, the Renaissance Center, and those in the Eastern Market Historic District; however, the city of Detroit has few big chain retailers. A 2007 Selzer and Co. poll found that nearly two-thirds of suburban residents said they occasionally dine and attend cultural or professional sporting events in downtown Detroit. The Fairlane Town Center, a super-regional shopping mall in Dearborn, is about 15 minutes from downtown Detroit.

A 2007 Social Compact report showed that city of Detroit residents spend about $1.7 billion annually in the suburbs for retail goods and services. As of 2009, "big box" super-centers had yet to open stores within the city limits of Detroit. In August 2009, the Meijer chain of super-centers announced it would open its first store within the city limits at the $90 million Gateway Marketplace. In April 2009, developers announced they had leased 60 percent of the retail space for a planned $90 million open-air mall, the Gateway Marketplace, to be located within the city-limits of Detroit. Gateway Marketplace opened in June 2013. Meijer then opened another store in the Old Redford section of the northwest side in 2015.

As of 2009, the city's major bookstore is Wayne State University Bookstore, leaving an opening for a major book store chain. New car dealerships have migrated to the suburbs. The decline of chain fast-food outlets within Detroit has closely paralleled that of the city itself, including a notable decline of locations of Yum! Brands-owned restaurants within the city limits to the point that Taco Bell is down to two locations on the city's west side, as well as an additional store in Wayne State University, as of 2019.

=== Supermarkets and grocery stores ===
As of 2009, German-based supermarket chain Aldi, which opened Detroit locations in 2001 and 2005, and the Michigan-based Spartan Stores were the grocery chains operating within the city of Detroit. In 2011, Whole Foods Market announced a new Midtown location in the city of Detroit. This location opened in June 2013 to much fanfare. Many independent grocery stores serve neighborhoods in Detroit; however, a 2009 University of Michigan report estimated that neighborhoods within the city limits of Detroit have sufficient income to sustain from $210 million to $377 million in additional grocery retail spending which has leaked to nearby suburbs and that the city could support up to 1,000,000 square feet (92,900 m^{2}) of additional retail grocery space. The report noted that retail grocery traffic tends to stimulate growth of other types of retail and that large retail chains have been slow to realize the growth potential for the city.

As of 2011, according to Martin Manna, the Chaldean American Chamber of Commerce's executive director, 75 of the 84 supermarkets in the Detroit city limits are owned by Assyrian Americans. Metro Foodland in the city is an African American owned business; it is the final remaining black-owned supermarket in Detroit, a majority black city. The owner, James Hooks, said that there always have been few black-owned grocery stores in Detroit. Former employees of Hooks had established two other black-owned stores, and both stores closed. Southwest Detroit has many independent grocery stores. In particular Southwest Detroit has several Hispanic supermarkets, or supermercados, that stock meat, specialty produce, and tortillas.

== Media ==
As the traditional automotive center, the region is a major source for related journalism and business news. Gale publishing and Crain Communications are headquartered in the metro area. The Detroit television market is the thirteenth-largest in the United States; however, these ratings do not include Canadian cable viewers who watch Detroit television stations; cities served by Detroit channels in Ontario include London, Ottawa, and Thunder Bay; many Western Canadians also watch Detroit channels, such as Saskatoon residents These channels include WJBK 2 (Fox), WDIV-TV 4 (NBC), WXYZ-TV 7 (ABC), WMYD 20 (MyNetworkTV), WPXD-TV 31 (Ion Television), WKBD-TV 50 (The CW), WTVS 56 (PBS) and WWJ-TV 62 (CBS). Detroit has the twelfth-largest radio market in the United States, though this ranking does not take into account Canadian audiences.

=== Movie theaters ===
As of 2015 there was one movie theater within the Detroit city limits showing first-run films: Bel Air 10 in northeast Detroit. There are some independent theater options: the Detroit Institute of Arts Detroit Film Theatre, the Cinema Detroit in Midtown, and the Redford Theatre in northwest Detroit. The Renaissance Center previously had the first-run theater Ren Cen 4 but it closed in the summer of 2015.

In 2015, there were 49 movie theaters in the Metro Detroit area outside the city of Detroit totaling 522 screens, many of them also showing first-run films and offering stadium seating options, which range from the five-screen Ford Drive-In in Dearborn to decades-old single-screen theaters in communities such as Farmington and Plymouth to the AMC Theatres Forum 30 megaplex in Sterling Heights. Of these, ten are megaplexes with 20 or more screens. These are found in Sterling Heights, Auburn Hills, Clinton, Dearborn, Southfield, Southgate, Brighton and Ypsilanti. Since then, Cinemark Theaters opened a 12-screen location at Southland Center in Taylor in April 2016, Cinemark also offers the Rave Motion Pictures Ann Arbor 20 in Ypsilanti.

IMAX options in Metro Detroit include dedicated theaters at The Henry Ford and the Michigan Science Center as well as in individual auditoriums at several AMC outlets and the aforementioned Rave 20 in Ypsilanti. AMC, Cinemark and Regal Entertainment Group, operators of the United Artists Commerce Stadium 14 just outside Walled Lake, face competition from Michigan-based chains Emagine Entertainment, MJR Digital Cinemas and Phoenix Theaters.

== Historic highlights ==
President Franklin Roosevelt referred to America as the "Arsenal of Democracy". Detroit and its automotive industries played a pivotal role in the Allied victory during World War II. With Europe, Asia, and the Pacific islands under siege by the Axis powers, Henry Ford's genius would be turned to mass production for the war effort. Specifically, the B-24 Liberator bomber, still the most produced allied heavy bomber in history, quickly shifted the balance of power. The aviation industry could produce, if everything went all right, one Consolidated Aircraft B-24 Bomber a day at an aircraft plant. Ford would show the world how to produce one B-24 an hour, and at peak production Ford produced 650 per month at Willow Run by 1944. Ford's Willow Run factory broke ground in the April 1941. At the time, it was the largest assembly plant in the world, with over 3,500,000 square feet (330,000 m^{2}). Edsel Ford, Henry Ford's son, under stress, died in the spring of 1943 of stomach cancer, prompting Henry Ford to resume day-to-day control of the Ford Motor Company. Willow Run completed its first B-24 in October 1942, with production increasing substantially by August 1943. Pilots and crew slept on the 1,300 cots waiting to fly the B-24s as they rolled off the assembly line at Ford's Willow Run facility.

== Largest employers ==
Metro Detroit's largest employers in 2026
| Company/organization | Metro location | Full-time local employees | Classification |
|---|---|---|---|
| Ford Motor Company | 1 American Road, Dearborn | 47,750 | Automotive |
| Henry Ford Health System | 1 Ford Place, Detroit | 45,640 | Health care |
| University of Michigan | Main Campus, Ann Arbor | 40,112 | Education and research |
| General Motors | 300 Renaissance Center, Detroit | 34,454 | Automotive |
| Stellantis North America | 1000 Chrysler Drive, Auburn Hills | 32,613 | Automotive |
| U.S. Government | 477 Michigan Ave., Detroit | 21,000 | Federal government |
| Corewell Health | | 20,538 | Health care |
| Trinity Health | 27870 Cabot Dr., Novi | 18,218 | Health care |
| Amazon.com | | 14,500 | Retail |
| City of Detroit | 2 Woodward Ave., Detroit | 10,309 | City government |
| State of Michigan | Cadillac Place, Detroit | 10,275 | State government |
| UWM Holdings | Pontiac | 9,100 | Financial services |
| Rocket Companies | One Campus Martius, Detroit | 9,071 | Financial services |
| Detroit Public Schools | 3011 W. Grand Blvd., Detroit | 6,982 | Education |
| Detroit Medical Center | 3800 John R., Detroit | 6,813 | Health care |
| Walmart | | 6,650 | Retail |
| DTE Energy | 2000 Second Ave., Detroit | 6,632 | Energy |
| Blue Cross Blue Shield of Michigan | 600 E. Lafayette Blvd., Detroit | 6,559 | Health care |
| Target Corporation | | 5,300 | Retail |
| Fifty Third Bank | | 4,700 | Financial services |
| McLaren Health | | 4,348 | Health care |
| Wayne State University | 658 W. Kirby, Detroit | 4,322 | Education and research |

== References and further reading ==
- Bak, Richard (2001). Detroit Across Three Centuries. Thomson Gale. ISBN 1-58536-001-5.
- Bak, Richard (2003). Henry and Edsel: The Creation of the Ford Empire. Wiley ISBN 0-471-23487-7
- Ballard, Charles L. (2006). Michigan's Economic Future: Challenges and Opportunities. Michigan State University Press. ISBN 0-87013-796-4.
- Ballard, Charles L.; Paul N. Courant & Douglas C. Drake (2003). Michigan at the Millennium. Michigan State University Press. ISBN 0870136682.
- Cantor, George (2005). Detroit: An Insiders Guide to Michigan. University of Michigan Press. ISBN 0-472-03092-2.
- Davis, Michael W. R. (2007). Detroit's Wartime Industry: Arsenal of Democracy (Images of America). Arcadia Publishing. ISBN 978-0-7385-5164-7.
- Fisher, Dale (2003). Building Michigan: A Tribute to Michigan's Construction Industry. Grass Lake, MI: Eyry of the Eagle Publishing. ISBN 1-891143-24-7.
- Fisher, Dale (2005). Southeast Michigan: Horizons of Growth. Grass Lake, MI: Eyry of the Eagle Publishing. ISBN 1-891143-25-5.
- Fisher, Dale (1994). Detroit: Visions of the Eagle. Grass Lake, MI: Eyry of the Eagle Publishing. ISBN 0-9615623-3-1.
- Gavrilovich, Peter; Bill McGraw (2000). The Detroit Almanac. Detroit Free Press. ISBN 0-937247-34-0.
- Hyde, Charles K. (2003). Riding the Roller Coaster: History of the Chrysler Corporation. Wayne State University Press. ISBN 0-8143-3091-6.
- Iacocca, Lee (2007). Where Have All the Leaders Gone. Scribner. ISBN 978-1-4165-3247-7.
- Poremba, David Lee (2003). Detroit: A Motor City History. Arcadia Publishing. ISBN 0-7385-2435-2.
- Poremba, David Lee (2001). Detroit in Its World Setting (timeline). Wayne State University. ISBN 0-8143-2870-9.
- Smith, Michael; Tom Featherstone (2001). Labor in Detroit (Images of America). Arcadia Publishing. ISBN 0-7385-1896-4.
- Vlasic, Bill; Bradley A. Stertz (2000). Taken for a Ride: How Daimler-Benz Drove off with Chrysler. William Morrow & Company. ISBN 0-688-17305-5.
- Woodford, Arthur M. (2001). This is Detroit 1701–2001. Wayne State University Press. ISBN 0-8143-2914-4.
