= Ford Credit =

Ford's financial services subsidiary

Ford Motor Credit Company LLC
- Type: Subsidiary
- Industry: Diversified financial
- Founded: 1959
- Headquarters: Dearborn, Michigan, U.S.
- Products: Automobile financing
- Revenue: ▲US$ 8.996 billion (2014)
- Operating income: ▲US$ 1.854 billion (2014)
- Net income: ▲US$ 1.705 billion (2014)
- Total assets: ▲US$ 122.1 billion (2014)
- Total equity: ▲US$ 11.37 billion (2014)
- Number of employees: 6,500 (2014)
- Parent: Ford Motor Company
- Website: ford.com/finance

Ford Motor Credit Company LLC, d/b/a Ford Credit, is the financial services arm of Ford Motor Company, and is headquartered in Dearborn, Michigan.

The predominant share of Ford Credit's business consists of financing Ford and Lincoln vehicles and supporting Ford and Lincoln dealers. Specifically, its business activities are concentrated in the area of automobile financing for consumers and dealership inventory and leasing. Ford Credit competes mainly on the basis of service and financing rate programs, including those sponsored by Ford. A key foundation of its service is providing broad and consistent purchasing policies for retail installment sale and lease contracts, and consistent support for dealer financing requirements across economic cycles. These policies have helped Ford Credit build strong relationships with Ford's dealer network that enhance competitiveness. Ford Credit also provides commercial financing and lines of credit to dealerships selling Ford Motor Company products. The firm also issues commercial paper and other debt instruments on Ford's behalf.

Ford Credit also owns Lincoln Automotive Financial Services, the arm that finances Lincoln vehicles.

Ford earned $2.63 billion EBIT with its Ford Credit segment in 2018, up from $2.31 billion in 2017. 2018 was the segment's highest full-year EBT in eight years. However, this upward trend may not last much longer as car sales continue to decline. Ford Credit's ROE, which fell from 22% in 2017 to 14% in 2018 forecasts the segment's coming decline.

== History ==
Ford began its journey into auto financing by launching a Weekly Purchase Plan in 1923. The program was designed to allow people to pay a certain amount to the bank weekly up until they had saved for the cost of a car. In 1926, Ford constructed a new factory in Germany, but most of the local population could not afford a car. This prompted Henry Ford to found Credit AG für Ford-Fahrzeuge, German for 'Ford Credit Company AG', in Berlin in order to help locals finance the purchase of a new car, in turn increasing sales. Henry and Edsel Ford became members of the board. In 1932, the newly-founded bank and the factory moved to Cologne. In 1962 the bank was renamed again to Ford Credit AG.

From 1975 to 1979, the company briefly was the owner of the Houston Astros major league baseball team, as well as of its ballpark, the Astrodome, and various other properties around Houston, Texas. This occurred after Astros owner Roy Hofheinz defaulted on a loan provided in 1972 by the Company in partnership with GE Capital. The default resulted from a downturn in the oil industry, and the creditors took over these various assets as a result. Senior loan officer Bill Odom, who would later rise to be the Chairman of Ford Motor Credit Company, acted as principal for the temporary ownership group, until the team was sold in 1979 to a group headed by John McMullen.

Since the automotive industry crisis of 2008–10, Ford Credit has been the only financial arm of Detroit's "Big Three" still owned by its parent automaker after the spinoff of GMAC (now Ally Financial) by General Motors and the purchase of Chrysler Financial (now TD Auto Finance) by Toronto-Dominion Bank.
