= Rofin-Sinar =

ROFIN
- Industry: Industrial Lasers
- Founded: 1975
- Headquarters: Hamburg, Germany
- Area served: Worldwide
- Website: rofin.com

The US based company ROFIN-SINAR Technologies Inc. develops, manufactures and sells laser sources and laser-based solutions for industrial material processing. On 7 November 2016, the company was acquired by Coherent Inc.

From 1996 to November 2016, ROFIN-SINAR Technologies’ shares have been traded on the NASDAQ Stock Exchange. In addition, in July 2001, RSTI was listed on the German "Prime Standard" segment of the Frankfurt Stock Exchange under the ISIN US7750431022.

The company's wide range of laser sources, including CO_{2} lasers, fiber lasers, solid-state, diode and various q-switch lasers are now available at Coherent.

== History ==
The company was founded 1975 in Hamburg, Germany as "SINAR Laser Systeme Verkaufsgesellschaft mbH". Sinar is the Sanskrit for "beam of light", but this name was already used by a Swiss manufacturer of cameras. By taking over the British enterprise Rofin, the company changed its name to ROFIN-SINAR Laser GmbH.

In 2015, Rofin came under significant pressure by an investor, SilverArrow Capital, to exchange the companies independent directors based on questions on compliance and below average management performance. SilverArrow, a London-based activist investment firm and one of the largest shareholders of the company, claimed in various public letters that the company was lacking an adequate growth strategy and had missed market opportunities for years. Before the shareholders could have a final vote on the claim in the upcoming Annual General Meeting the company announced it was being acquired by a competitor company, Coherent Inc.
