= TD Auto Finance =

Automotive financial services provider

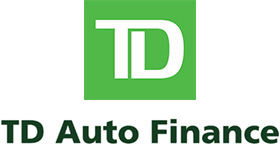
- Type: Subsidiary
- Industry: Auto loans, Financial services
- Predecessor: Chrysler Credit Corporation
- Founded: 1964
- Headquarters: Southfield, Michigan, United States
- Products: Auto financing, dealer services
- Owner: Toronto-Dominion Bank
- Website: www.tdautofinance.com

TD Auto Finance is the automotive financial services arm of Toronto-Dominion Bank, providing dealer and retail consumer auto loan products in the United States. The company is headquartered in Southfield, Michigan.

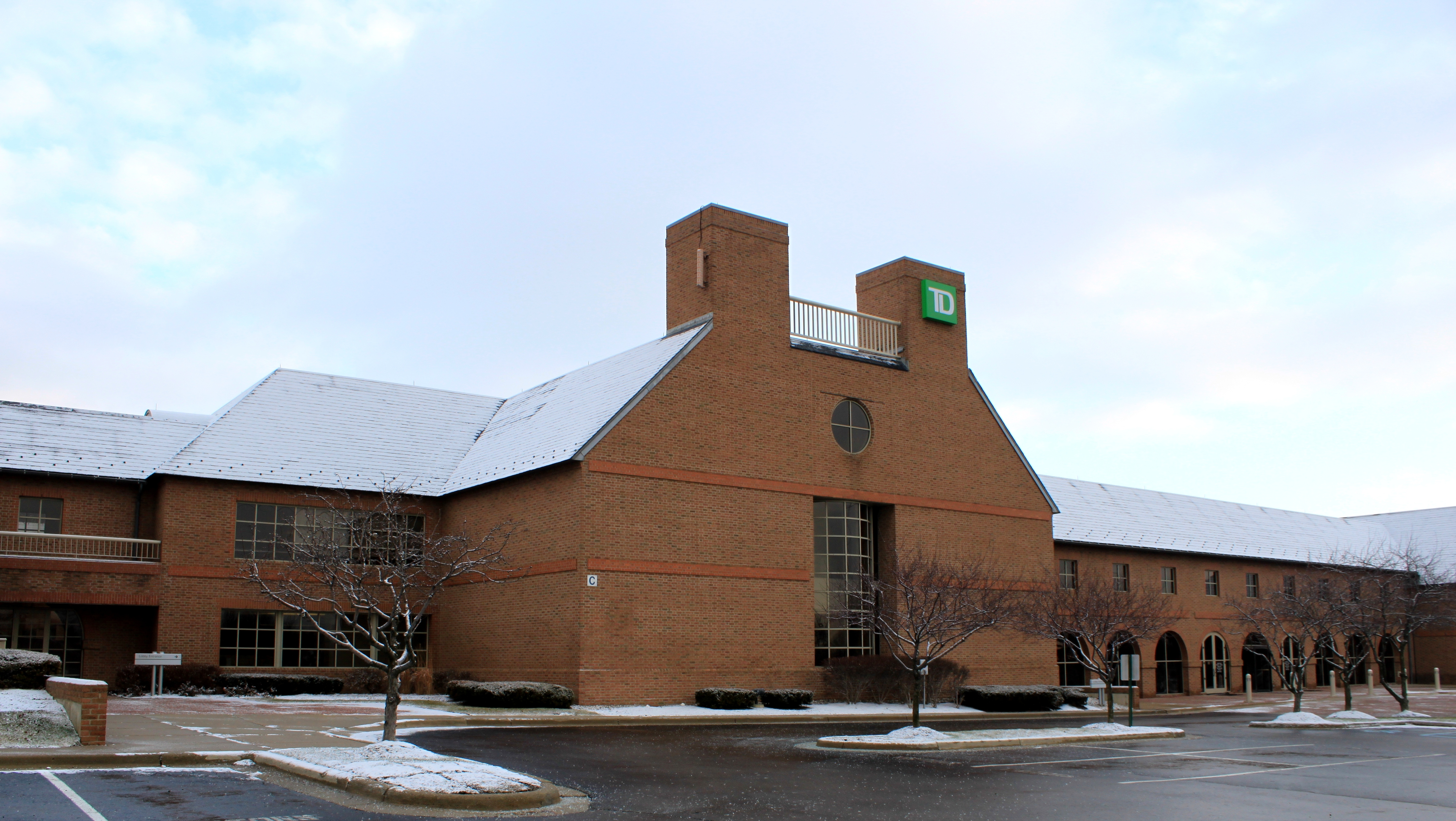
TD Auto Finance corporate offices, Farmington Hills

== History ==
=== As Chrysler Financial ===
Founded as Chrysler Credit Corporation in 1964, the company provided financial products and services to support sales of Chrysler, Jeep, and Dodge vehicles. By 2007, it had approximately 3,600 employees worldwide and managed contracts valued at about US$75 billion.

The company operated in the United States, Canada, Mexico, Puerto Rico, and Venezuela under regional subsidiaries such as Chrysler Financial Canada and Chrysler Financial de Venezuela.

=== Financial crisis and TARP bailout ===
In January 2009, Chrysler Financial received $1.5 billion from the Troubled Asset Relief Program (TARP). The company stated that the funds were used to finance 85,000 auto loans for Chrysler vehicles. It repaid the TARP loan in July 2009 through an asset-backed securitization arranged under the Term Asset-Backed Securities Loan Facility program.

=== Acquisition by Toronto-Dominion Bank ===
In December 2010, Toronto-Dominion Bank announced it would acquire Chrysler Financial for $6.3 billion from private equity firm Cerberus Capital Management. The deal closed in 2011, and the business was renamed TD Auto Finance in June of that year.

=== As TD Auto Finance ===
Following the acquisition, TD Auto Finance became a key part of TD Bank Group’s U.S. operations. The company continues to provide dealer finance plans, consumer auto loans, and related financial services.

== See also ==
- Economy of metropolitan Detroit
