= Northland Center =

Shopping mall in Southfield, Michigan

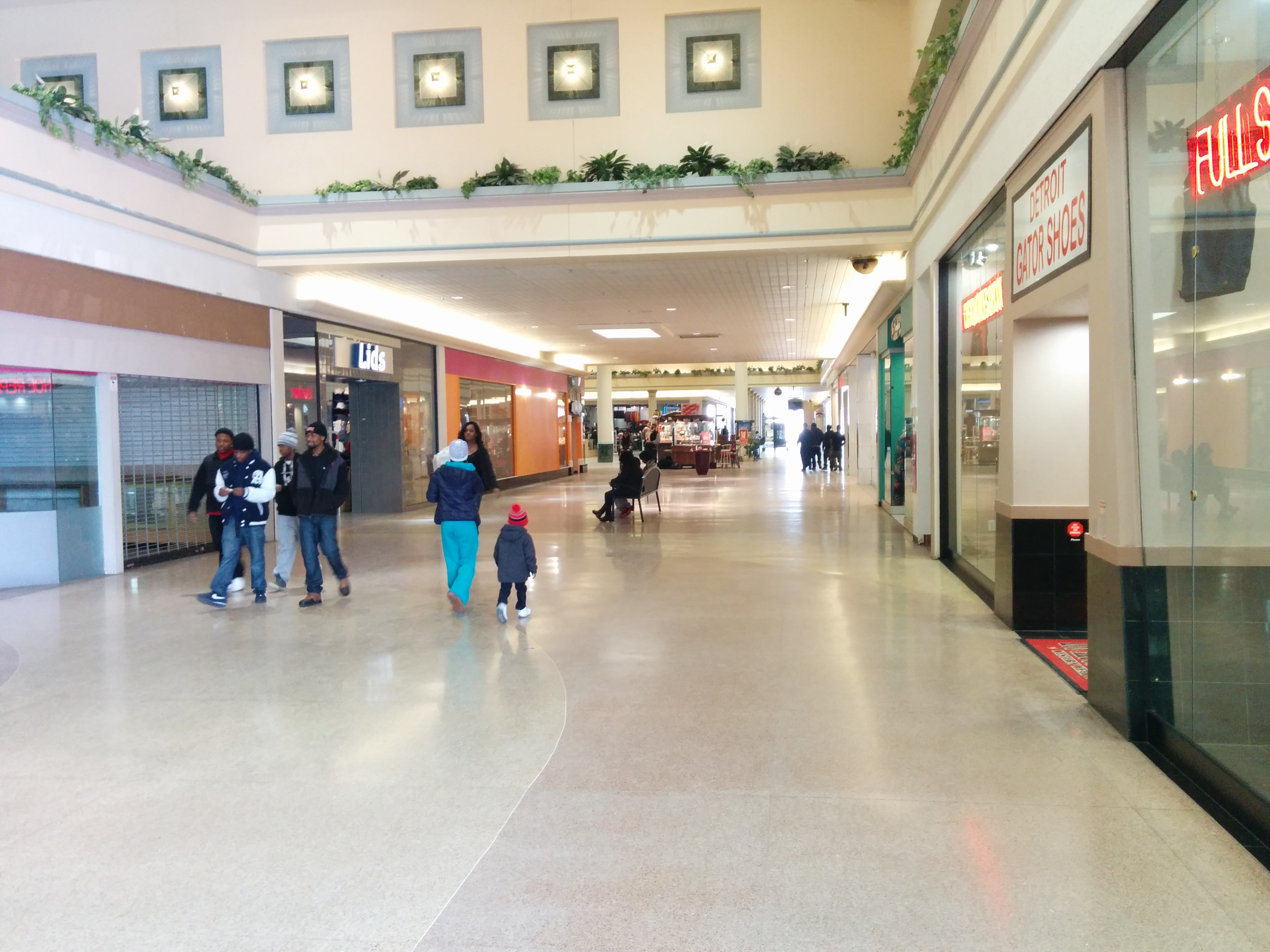
- Northland Center in March 2015
- Location: Southfield, Michigan, U.S.
- Coordinates: 42°27′4.2″N 83°12′16.8″W
- Address: 21500 Northwestern Highway
- Opened: March 22, 1954
- Closed: April 15, 2015
- Demolished: 2021
- Developer: J.L. Hudson Corporation
- Manager: Spinoso Real Estate Group (custody of mall during receivership)
- Owner: Contour Companies
- Architect: Victor Gruen
- Num. of stores: 100
- Num. of anchor tenants: 6 (0 open, 6 vacant)
- Floor area: 1,449,719 sq ft (134,683.3 m^{2})
- Floors: 1 (2 in former JCPenney and former Ward's, 5 in former Macy's)
- Parking: 8,671

Northland Center was an enclosed shopping mall on an approximately 159-acre (64 ha) site located near the intersection of M-10 (the John C. Lodge Freeway) and Greenfield Road in Southfield, Michigan, an inner-ring suburb of Detroit, Michigan, United States. Construction began in 1952 and the mall opened on March 22, 1954. Northland was a milestone for regional shopping centers in the United States. Designed by Victor Gruen, the mall initially included a four-level Hudson's with a ring of stores surrounding it. As originally built, it was an open-air pedestrian mall with arrayed structures. The mall was enclosed in 1975 and expanded several times in its history. Additions included five other department store anchors: J. C. Penney in 1975, MainStreet in 1985 (sold to Kohl's three years later), and TJ Maxx, Target, and Montgomery Ward in the 1990s. Managed by Spinoso Real Estate Group, Northland Center featured approximately 100 stores. Macy's, the last anchor, closed on March 22, 2015, exactly 61 years to the date of the mall's opening. The mall was partially demolished in September 2021, and is currently being redeveloped as Northland City Center.

== History ==
=== Early years ===
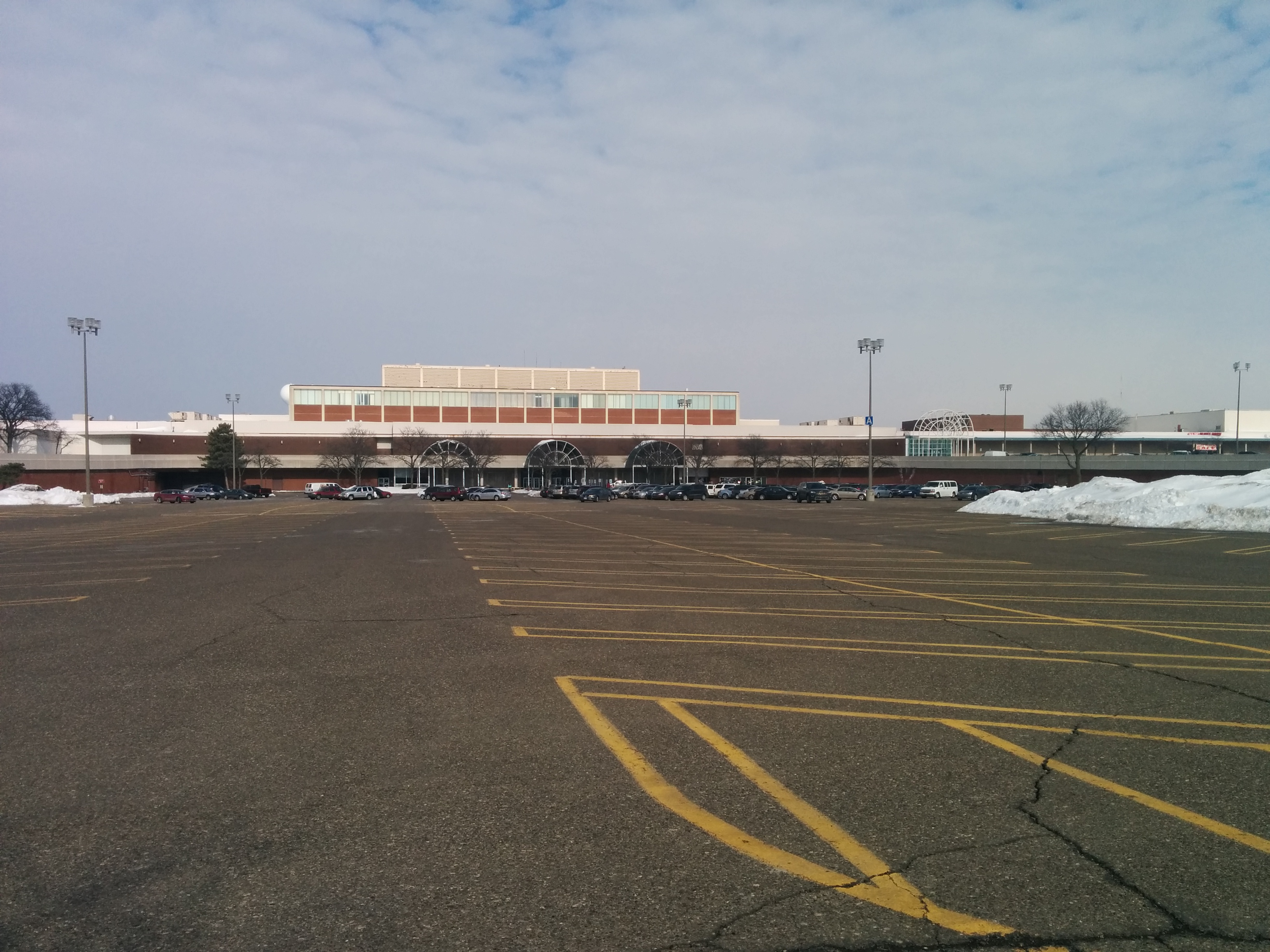
The mall in March 2015.

The J. L. Hudson Company, a Detroit-based department store chain, built Northland Center. Hudson's—at its Downtown Detroit location on Woodward Avenue—grew to become the second largest department store (next to Macy's of New York City) in the United States. In 1948, architect Victor Gruen convinced Hudson's, then reluctant to build branch stores, to take advantage of suburban growth by constructing a ring of four shopping centers surrounding the city of Detroit. Of the four – Eastland Center, Southland Center, and Westland Center were the others – Northland was the first to be built. These malls encircle Detroit's inner-ring of suburbs. At the time, Northland Center was the world's largest shopping center.

Northland Center became the first major postwar development in suburban Detroit and was the first of many forays into the suburbs by Hudson's. Some $30,000,000 was invested in constructing the facility. The first-year gross for the Northland Hudson's was $88 million.

The shopping center opened to much fanfare. Articles about the center appeared in national media outlets such as The Wall Street Journal, Time, Look, Life, Ladies' Home Journal and Newsweek. Reviewers had heralded the Northland as the future of shopping in post-war America. Besides Hudson's, Northland opened with a number of other local retailers including: Hughes & Hatcher, Max Green's, Kosins, The Wild Pair, Barna-Bee Children's Shops, Cunningham Drug, Baker's Shoes, Chandler's Shoes, Big Boy restaurant, Himelhoch's, Winkelman's, Albert's, S.S. Kresge Corporation, Robinson Furniture, Raimi's Curtains, Better Made Potato Chips, Kroger, Barricini Candies, and Sanders Confectionery. Northland featured auditoriums, The Northland Playhouse, The Northland Theater, a bank, post office, infirmary, sculptures by Marshall Fredericks, fountains, an office for lost children, lavish landscaping, and free gasoline for customers who had run out.

Gruen would later grow disenchanted with the malls he helped start with Northland. The architect, who also designed suburban Detroit's three other "directional" malls (Eastland Center, Westland Center, and Southland Center), Chicago's Randhurst, and South Jersey's Cherry Hill Mall, pronounced himself disillusioned with the ugliness and fast-buck approach of many projects. "I refuse to pay alimony for those bastard developments", he told Time magazine.

==== Northland Mall Tunnels ====
The shopping center also featured various underground service tunnels used for various purposes — mainly truck deliveries, storage, workshop space, and, at one point, a nuclear bomb shelter. The network is several miles long and has 484 rooms. When the building is demolished, the tunnels will likely be razed as well. There were also additional tunnels, although much narrower, that ran between the mall and an old power station, police substation and Firestone building.

=== Expansion ===
Northland Center was enclosed as a mall in 1975, the same year that J. C. Penney was added. Federated Department Stores' short-lived MainStreet chain opened in 1985 and was later acquired by and rechristened Kohl's in March 1989. T.J. Maxx and a food court were added in 1991, while Montgomery Ward opened in November 1994. Target opened in April 1996. A Jeepers! location opened in 1999, but later closed in 2012.

=== Loss of anchors and closure ===
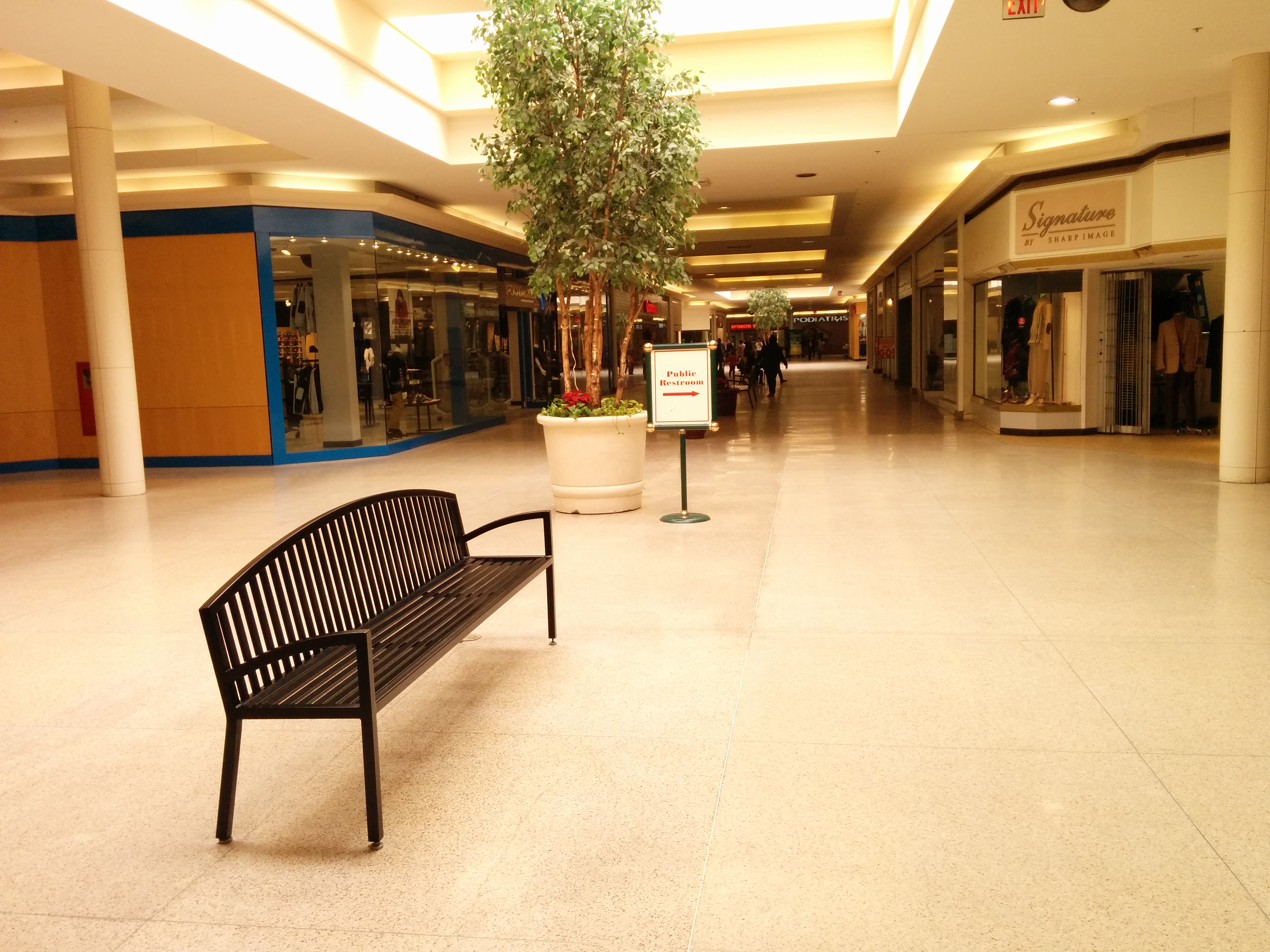
A mall hallway in 2015.

Construction of other malls in the metro area presented remodeling challenges and redevelopment opportunities for the metro area's inner-ring suburban malls including Northland. Throughout the 1980s and 1990s, Northland had a turnover of major tenants. Kohl's closed its operations in 1995 at the mall, along with a sister store at Eastland Center. Target built its store on the building's west end and opened in 1996. Montgomery Ward shuttered due to the chain's financial troubles in 1998; JCPenney and T.J. Maxx closed in 2000 and 2004, respectively. National Wholesale Liquidators opened in 2005 in Wards' former building, and closed three years later. In 2007, Target completed a renovation of its interior and exterior, as well as an expansion to accommodate a pharmacy, Starbucks, and Pizza Hut, but in November 2014, Target announced the closing of its store. The store closed in February 2015 as part of closing 11 stores nationwide. Macy's also announced that it was closing operations at Northland Center as well, with the store closing on March 22, 2015, 61 years to the day the store opened as Hudson's in 1954.

With just a handful of inline stores left, Northland Center officially closed on April 15, 2015.

=== Financial trouble and resulting closure ===
Northland Center was sold on December 18, 2008, to New York City-based Ashkenazy Acquisition Corporation, with Jones Lang LaSalle (which also owns Eastland Center in Harper Woods). Ashkenazy Acquisition defaulted on a $31 million payment in the summer of 2014, and Spinoso Real Estate Group was named receiver.

In February 2015, following the closure of the anchor stores, a local judge announced that the mall would be closing as of March 2015. Around this time, the mall's official website closed.

On October 7, 2015, the city of Southfield purchased the property for $2.5 million with plans to demolish most of the property. The only remnants of the original property that would be spared are the maintenance garage, the network of tunnels underneath the mall, the water tower and the building that formerly housed Hudson's/Marshall Field's/Macy's.

=== Redevelopment opportunities and Northland City Center ===
On October 26, 2017, two-and-a-half years after the mall's shuttering, demolition began on Northland Center, with the former Target store being the first section to be levelled, followed by the former Firestone tire center. The city of Southfield submitted a proposal to Amazon for its search to establish a second headquarters, pitching the former 125-acre Northland Center site; ultimately, the former Michigan State Fairgrounds site in Detroit was chosen. In July 2021, the city of Southfield sold Northland Center to Contour Companies for $11 million.

Notes left from former Northland Center employees.

In September 2021, demolition started to pave the way for a new $403 million redevelopment project that includes large-scale housing and some retail. The 115-acre 1954 original J.L. Hudson (at the time of closure was a Macy's) building would be saved. The first phase of the redevelopment was slated to feature "1,546 new for-rent housing units, the majority of them in 14 planned five- and six-story buildings." The "remaining 254 residences would be loft-style apartments built into Northland's original shell surrounding the former Hudson's." The original building, Hudson's, was then to become a "530,406-square-foot food and goods emporium called Hudson City Market, featuring food and entertainment options, home furnishing stores, local "mom and pop" businesses as well as office space."

== Demographic and consumer changes ==
A common complaint and belief was that Northland's decline and demise was in part to the change in consumer base and changing demographics in the Detroit metropolitan area. During Northland's early years, it enjoyed a large consumer base, with little competition from rival malls. Competition from newer malls like Somerset Collection, Fairlane Town Center and Twelve Oaks Mall contributed to the migration from Northland. Northland failed to compete and change with the changing needs and expectations of consumers and was slowly replaced by more upscale shopping alternatives. In its later years, some reported violent crimes and rampant shoplifting further contributed to its decline.

== See also ==
- List of shopping malls in Michigan
