= Southland Center =

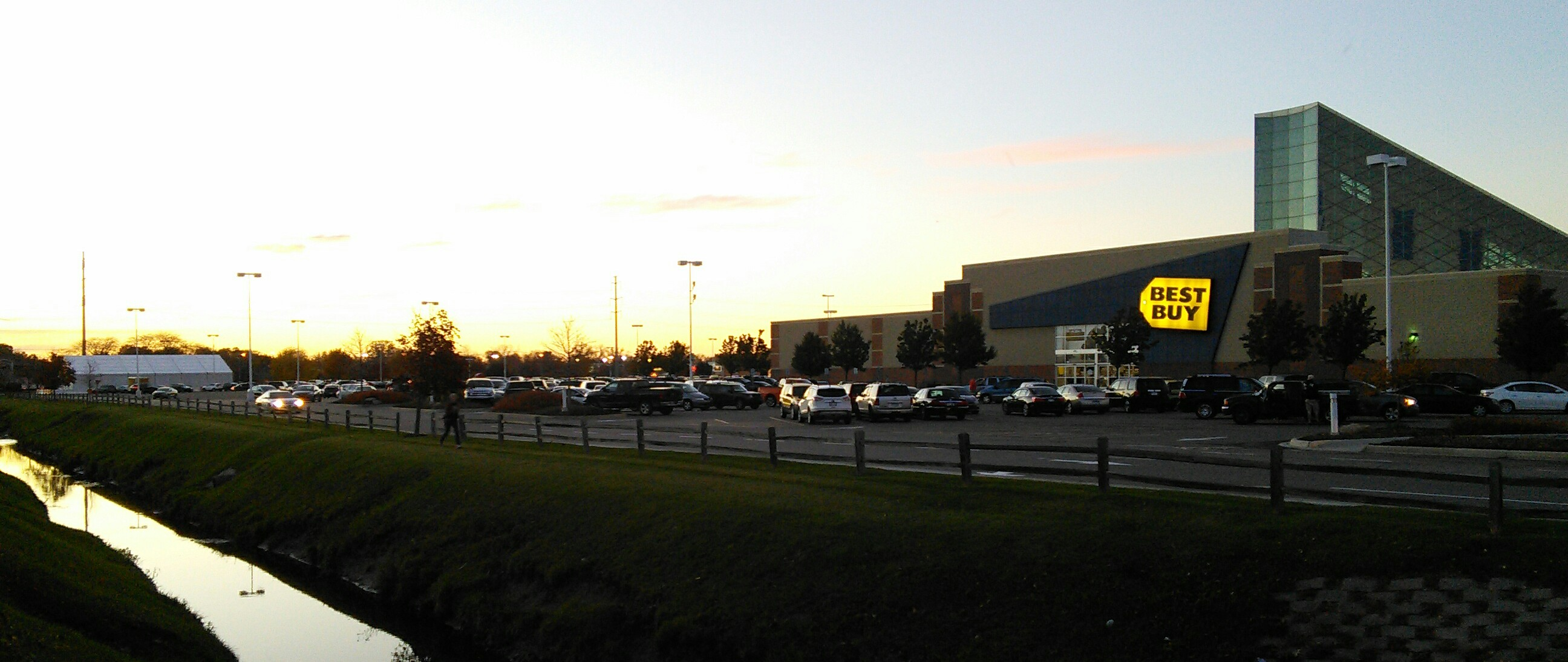
- Southland Center from the eastern Eureka Road entrance, November 2014
- Location: Taylor, Michigan
- Coordinates: 42.200038°N 83.254201°W
- Opened: July 20, 1970; 56 years ago
- Developer: Dayton-Hudson Corporation (original); The Rouse Company (Southland Shopping Center, Inc.) (1990s expansion)
- Manager: JLL Properties
- Owner: Greenwood Global
- Architect: Victor Gruen and Louis G. Redstone
- Num. of stores: 80
- Num. of anchor tenants: 6
- Floor area: 920,000 sq ft (85,000 m^{2})
- Floors: 1 (2 in JCPenney, 3 in Macy's)
- Public transit: SMART 125, 160, 275
- Website: shopsouthlandcenter.com

Southland Center is an enclosed regional shopping mall in Taylor, Michigan, United States. It is anchored by Macy's, JCPenney, Best Buy, and Cinemark Theatres. It is the newest of the Detroit area's original four "land" malls (Northland, Southland, Eastland, Westland). Southland Center opened on July 20, 1970. It is owned by Illinois-based Greenwood Global and managed by Jones Lang LaSalle.

== History ==
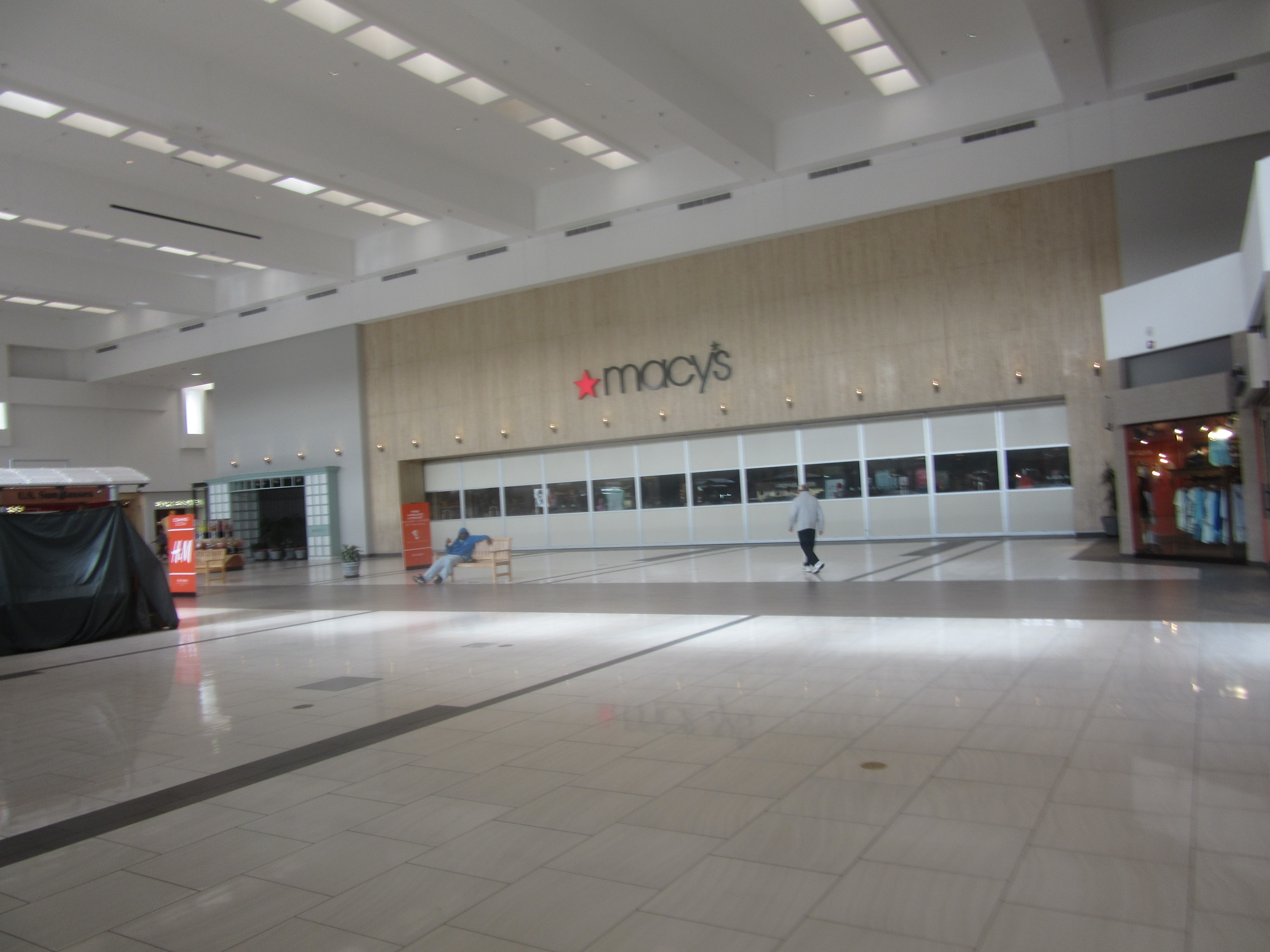
An interior entrance to the Macy's store in May 2015. This was taken before the store opened for the day.

Southland Center, planned by Detroit-based Hudson's as early as 1962, was designed by Victor Gruen Associates and Louis G. Redstone Associates, and the newly formed Dayton-Hudson Corporation (a merger of Hudson's and Dayton's of Minneapolis) developed the mall. After beginning construction in August 1968, Southland Mall opened on July 20, 1970, initially anchored by a three-level, 272,000-square-foot (25,300 m^{2}) Hudson's at the center of the mall and junior-anchored by a Woolworth's dime store south of the center court and a Kroger supermarket on the eastern side, as well as stores including shoe store L.G. Haig, Lane Bryant, and local clothing chains Winkelman's and Hughes Hatcher Sufferin. A two-screen movie theater, operated by local chain Suburban Detroit Theatres and located off the west court, opened at 6:45 p.m. on October 8, 1970, nearly three months after the rest of the mall.

On June 25, 1973, the Southeastern Michigan Transportation Authority introduced public bus transit access to Southland Center through expansions of its Great Lakes Transit route from River Rouge, Ecorse and Wyandotte and new Metropolitan Transit routes from Melvindale, Allen Park and Lincoln Park. Kroger moved to a larger facility across Eureka Road in mid-December 1975, with the former store gutted and divided into several smaller stores, attached to a new wing featuring new stores including General Nutrition Centers and B. Dalton and ending in a new two-level; 215,000-square-foot (20,000 m^{2}) JCPenney store that opened on October 6, 1976.

The theater expanded from two to four screens and reopened on December 16, 1983, and Suburban Detroit Theatres was sold to AMC Theatres in 1986. In 1988, a small addition was built onto the western side, including a 75,000-square-foot (7,000 m^{2}) Mervyn's store that opened on August 12 of that year, and in October, The Rouse Company acquired the mall from Dayton-Hudson, then forming the subsidiary Southland Shopping Center, Inc., a division of Rouse Southland, Inc.

First announced in 1991, a food court called Picnic In The Garden broke ground on February 13, 1992 and opened on November 19, 1992, featuring a large triangular-shaped skylight, along with an expansion to Champs Sports' store and a new Lerner New York store. Woolworth's closed in mid-December 1992 and was replaced by Tilt Arcade a short time later before eventually being split into smaller storefronts by the early 2000s. AMC's four-screen theater closed on January 17, 1999 and was replaced with a 22,500-square-foot (2,090 m^{2}) Borders Books & Music on August 25, 2000. Hudson's became Marshall Field's in 2001 and transitioned to Macy's in 2006. Also in 2006, Mervyns exited Michigan and the food court, was razed and rebuilt for Best Buy.

In 2004, The Rouse Company was sold to General Growth Properties, and in 2011, the Borders store shuttered along with the entire chain. Rouse Properties was spun off from General Growth Properties in January 2012. The company then added several new tenants; including rue21, Torrid and Taco Bell, to Southland Center, in addition, several existing tenants also renovated their stores. Forever 21 moved from a smaller pre-existing storefront to the previous Borders space opening in spring 2013. Then, later in 2013, several smaller store spaces near JCPenney were demolished and replaced by a new 11,300-square-foot (1,050 m^{2}) Shoe Carnival store (which relocated from a strip development across Eureka Road).

In July 2014, Rouse Properties announced that the previous Mervyn's space would be replaced by a 12-screen, all-digital, Cinemark multiplex theater accompanied by several outdoor sit-down restaurants. In addition, in the late summer of 2014, a complete renovation of the mall began. This project added new flooring and lighting, removed the fountain and replaced it with seating and electronic-device chargers and added several more tenants including Pink and Zumiez. This project was completed in the summer of 2015. Ulta opened a location in the mall along the corridor between Macy's and Best Buy in August 2014. H&M opened in October 2015.

As of September 2018, a section on the third floor of Macy's became a Macy's Backstage. The mall was sold by Brookfield Properties to Greenwood Global on January 25, 2025, with Jones Lang LaSalle taking over management. Two months after the sale, Forever 21 went out of business, resulting in the closure of the Southland Center store.

== See also ==
- Northland Center
- Eastland Center (Detroit)
- Westland Center
- Fairlane Town Center
