= Victor Gruen =

Austrian-American architect (1903–1980)

- Born: July 18, 1903; Vienna, Austria-Hungary
- Died: February 14, 1980 (aged 76); Vienna, Austria
- Education: Vienna Academy of Fine Arts
- Occupation: Architect

Victor David Gruen, born Viktor David Grünbaum (July 18, 1903 – February 14, 1980), was an Austrian-American architect best known as a pioneer in the design of shopping malls in the United States. He is also noted for his urban revitalization proposals, described in his writings and applied in master plans such as for Fort Worth, Texas (1955), Kalamazoo, Michigan (1958) and Fresno, California (1965). An advocate of prioritizing pedestrians over cars in urban cores, he was also the designer of the first climate controlled shopping center in the United States, Southdale Center, and the first outdoor pedestrian mall in the United States, the Kalamazoo Mall.

== Early life ==
Viktor David Grünbaum (Yiddish: וויקטאָר דוד גרונבוים) was born on July 18, 1903, in a middle-class Jewish family in Vienna, Austria. He studied architecture at the Vienna Academy of Fine Arts, a/k/a the Vienna Technological Institute and Academy of Fine Arts in Austria. He also worked under Peter Behrens, a leading German architect. A committed socialist, from 1926 until 1934 he ran the "political cabaret at the Naschmarkt"-theatre. At that time he came to know Felix Slavik, the future mayor of Vienna, and they became friends.

== Career ==
As an architect he worked for Peter Behrens, and in 1933 opened his own architectural firm in Vienna. His firm specialized in remodeling of shops and apartments.

When Germany annexed Austria in 1938, he emigrated to the United States. Short and stout, he landed "with an architect's degree, eight dollars, and no English." Arriving in New York he changed his name to Gruen from Grünbaum and started to work as a draftsman. After the success of his design for the Lederer leather-goods boutique on Fifth Avenue, he received further commissions for the design of shops, including Ciro’s on Fifth Avenue, Steckler’s on Broadway, Paris Decorators on the Bronx Concourse, and eleven branches of the clothing chain Grayson’s.

External videos
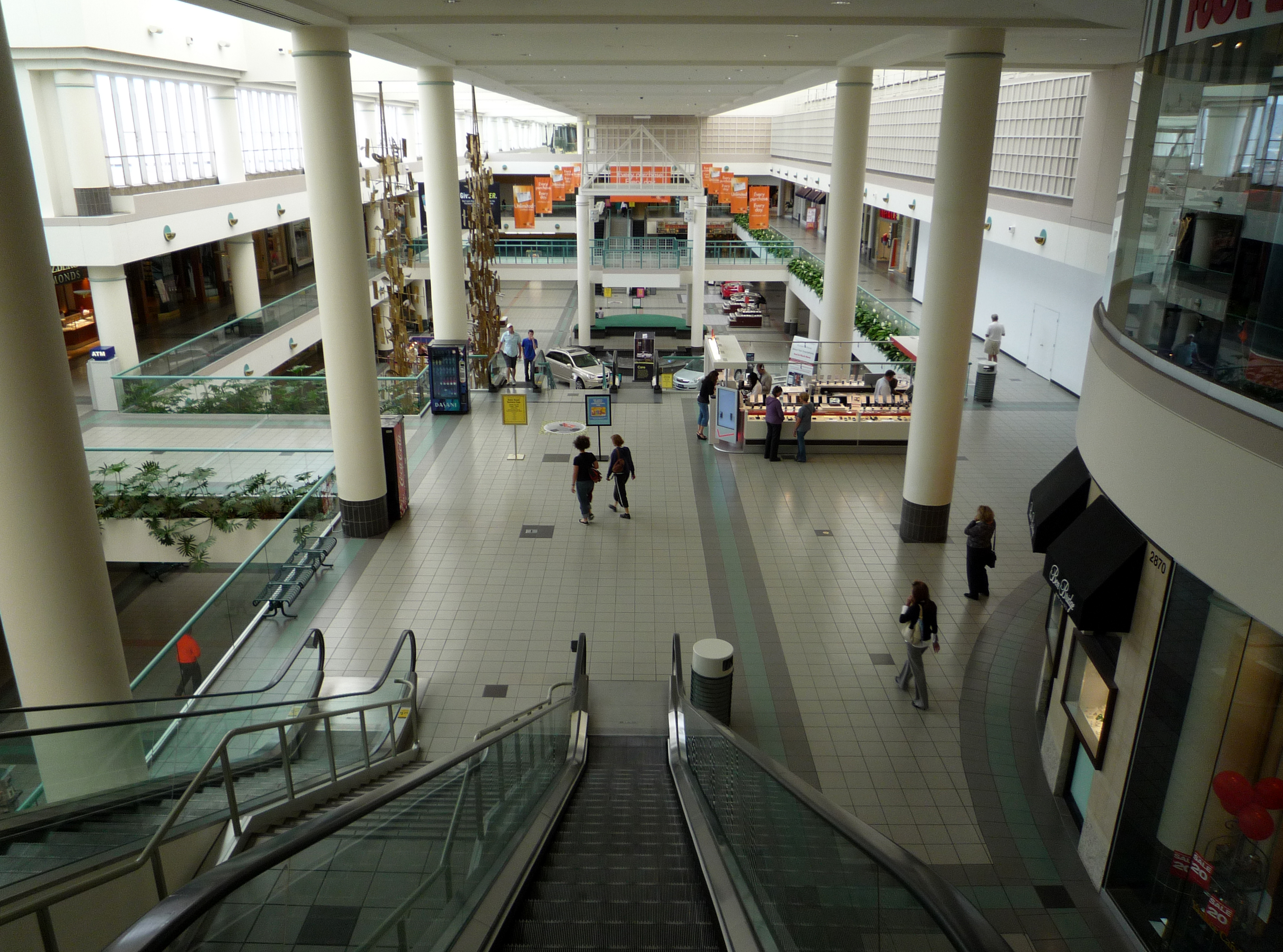
- Buildings that Changed America #8 Southdale Center, WTTW,

In 1941 Gruen moved to Los Angeles. He was naturalized as a US citizen in 1943. In 1951, he founded the architectural firm "Victor Gruen Associates", which was soon to become one of the major planning offices of that time. After the war, he designed the first suburban open-air shopping facility called Northland Mall near Detroit in 1954. After the success of the first project, he designed his best-known work for the owners of Dayton Department stores, the 800,000-square-foot (74,000 m^{2}) Southdale Mall in Edina, Minnesota, the first enclosed shopping mall in the country. Opening in 1956, Southdale was meant as the kernel of a full-fledged community. The mall was commercially successful, but the original design was never fully realized, as the intended apartment buildings, schools, medical facilities, park and lake were not built. Because he invented the modern mall, Canadian journalist Malcolm Gladwell, writing in The New Yorker, suggested that "Victor Gruen may well have been the most influential architect of the twentieth century."

Until the mid-1970s, his office designed over fifty shopping malls in the United States. Gruen was the principal architect for a luxury housing development built on the 48-acre (190,000 m^{2}) site of Boston, Massachusetts' former West End neighborhood. The first of several Gruen towers and plazas was completed in 1962. This development, known as Charles River Park is regarded by many as a dramatically ruthless re-imagining of a former immigrant tenement neighborhood (Gans, O'Conner, The Hub). In 1956, Gruen drafted a comprehensive revitalization plan for the central business district of downtown Fort Worth, Texas, but most components of the plan were never realized. Dr. ETH Ing. Walid Jabri, the architect and structural engineer, designed the 55,000 square-meter business complex Centre Gefinor, which was built in the late 1960s on Rue Clémenceau in Beirut, Lebanon for which Victor Gruen designed the complete commercial area on the ground floor and the mezzanine after the completion of the skeleton. Gruen also designed the Greengate Mall in Greensburg, Pennsylvania, which opened in 1965, as well as the Lakehurst Mall in 1971 for Waukegan, Illinois.

In 1968, he returned to Vienna, where he engaged in the gradual transformation of the inner city into a pedestrian zone, of which only some parts have been implemented, including Kärntner Straße and Graben.

In a speech in London in 1978, Gruen disavowed shopping mall developments as having "bastardized" his ideas: "I refuse to pay alimony for those bastard developments. They destroyed our cities." Gruen died on February 14, 1980. He was married four times and had two children.

== Influence ==
Gruen's book The Heart of our Cities: The Urban Crisis, Diagnosis and Cure was a major influence on Walt Disney's city planning ambitions and his ideas for the original EPCOT.

== Gruen v. Gruen ==
In 1963, on his 21st birthday, his son New York attorney Michael S. Gruen (then a Harvard undergraduate) was given a painting "Schloss Kammer am Attersee II" by Gustav Klimt. While ownership of the painting was given to his son in 1963, the elder Gruen maintained a life estate on the chattel and continued to hang it in his living room and even paid for insurance and repairs. Upon Gruen's death in 1980, his widow, Kemija, refused to surrender the painting to Michael, resulting in a landmark case in the New York Supreme Court and Court of Appeals. The Court of Appeals ruled the basis of inter vivos gifts, including the plaintiff having the burden of proof to a clear and convincing standard that the chattel was a gift and the required elements of a gift. Kemija Gruen claimed that if the painting was to be given after death, even if such arrangement was made years earlier, then the will, not a letter, would be instructive as to disposition. Michael Gruen was eventually awarded $2.5 million.

== Works ==
=== Shopping malls ===
- Northland Center, Southfield, Michigan, 1954
- Woodmar Plaza, Hammond, Indiana, 1954
- Westfield Valley Fair, San Jose, California, 1956
- Southdale Center, Edina, Minnesota, 1956
- Riverside Plaza, Riverside, California, 1957
- Bayfair Center, San Leandro, California, 1957
- Eastland Center, Harper Woods, Michigan, 1957
- Glendale Town Center, Indianapolis, Indiana, 1958
- Maryvale Shopping City, Phoenix, Arizona, 1959
- Kalamazoo Mall, Kalamazoo, Michigan, 1959
- South Bay Center, Redondo Beach, California, 1959
- South Shore Plaza, Braintree, Massachusetts, 1961
- Winrock Center, Albuquerque, New Mexico, 1961
- Cherry Hill Mall, Cherry Hill, New Jersey, 1961
- Brookdale Center, Brooklyn Center, Minnesota, 1962
- Midtown Plaza, Rochester, New York, 1962
- Northway Mall, Pittsburgh, Pennsylvania, 1962
- Randhurst Mall, Mount Prospect, Illinois, 1962
- Lincoln Square Mall, Urbana, Illinois, 1964
- South County Center, St Louis Missouri, 1963
- Westfield Topanga, Canoga Park, California, 1964
- Fulton Mall, Fresno, California, 1964
- Greengate Mall, Greensburg, Pennsylvania, 1965
- South Hills Village, Pittsburgh, Pennsylvania, 1965
- Westland Center, Westland, Michigan, 1965
- Plymouth Meeting Mall, Plymouth Meeting, Pennsylvania, 1966
- South Coast Plaza, Costa Mesa, California, 1967
- Midland Mall, Warwick, Rhode Island, 1967
- Park Lane Centre, Reno, Nevada, 1967
- Monroeville Mall, Monroeville, Pennsylvania, 1969

==== By associates ====
- Yorktown Center, Lombard, Illinois, 1968
- Rosedale Center, Roseville, Minnesota, 1969
- Southland Center, Taylor, Michigan, 1970
- Lakehurst Mall, Waukegan, Illinois, 1971
- Central City Mall, San Bernardino, California, 1972
- Commons Mall, Columbus, Indiana, 1973
- Ridgedale Center, Minnetonka, Minnesota, 1974
- Westfield Culver City, Culver City, California, 1975
- ZCMI Center Mall, Salt Lake City, Utah, 1975
- Twelve Oaks Mall, Novi, Michigan, 1977
- Port Plaza Mall, Green Bay, Wisconsin, 1977

=== Westchester and Gateway Center ===
- Millron's Westchester (later The Broadway Westchester), 1949, Westchester, Los Angeles, 1949
- Gateway Center (Newark), in Newark, New Jersey, 1970s

== Selected writings ==
- Victor Gruen, Larry Smith (1960) Shopping Towns USA: The Planning of Shopping Centers New York: Reinhold
- Victor Gruen (1965) The Heart of our Cities: The Urban Crisis. Diagnosis and Cure London: Thames and Hudson
- Victor Gruen (1973) Centers for the Urban Environment: Survival of the Cities. New York: Van Nostrand Reinhold

== In media ==
- Victor Gruen is the namesake of an Australian TV series named Gruen on the ABC which analyses advertising.
- Victor Gruen was mentioned in the podcast The Joe Rogan Experience by hip-hop artist Kanye West.
- Victor Gruen was mentioned in the podcast 99% Invisible episode 621 "Secret Mall Apartment" that was released March 25, 2025.

== See also ==
- Elsie Caroline Krummeck (Gruen's second wife and fellow designer)
- Fox Plaza (San Francisco)
- Gateway Center (Newark)
- Gruen transfer
- South Coast Plaza
- Wilshire Beverly Center
- Yorktown Center
