= List of pedestrian zones =

List of urban areas designed for human movement by walking

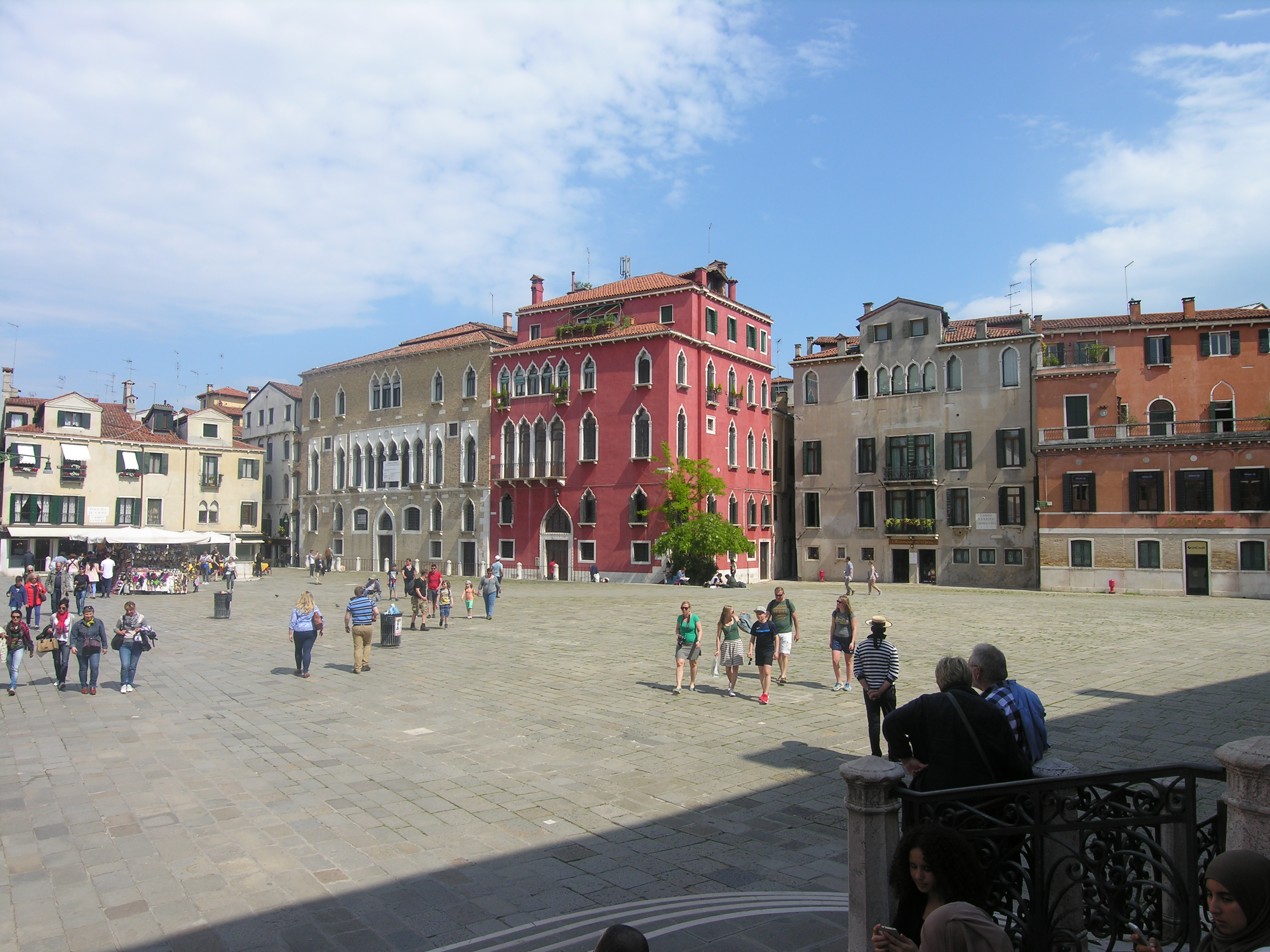
Venice has a pedestrian zone covering c. 726.8 ha out of c. 798 ha (c. 91%) of its historic city centre.

This is a list of pedestrian zones: urban streets where vehicle traffic has been restricted or eliminated for pedestrian use only. These are usually pedestrianised urban centres of a city, town or district with a residential population that have been retrofitted.

Country	Location	Details
Armenia	Yerevan	Northern Avenue, located in the Kentron district of central Yerevan, is a large pedestrian avenue. The avenue was inaugurated in 2007 and is mainly home to residential buildings, offices, luxury shops and restaurants.
Australia	Melbourne	Several areas within the Melbourne CBD, including the Bourke Street Mall, Swanston Street, Block Arcade, Royal Arcade, Degraves Street, Queen Victoria Village, City Square and Federation Square
Australia	Perth	Hay Street in the Perth CBD became the first pedestrianised street of any Australian major capital in 1972
Australia	Sydney	Within the Sydney CBD, George Street was pedestrianised between Bridge Street and Hay Street in stages between 2021 and 2023
Belgium	Brussels	Europe's largest pedestrian zone (French: Le Piétonnier), established in phases starting in 2015 and set to cover 50 hectares (120 acres). The area covers much of the historic centre within the Small Ring (the ring road built on the site of the 14th century walls), including the Grand-Place, the Place de Brouckère/De Brouckèreplein, the Boulevard Anspach/Anspachlaan, and the Place de la Bourse/Beursplein.
France	Montpellier	With a coherent historic center, the city banished cars from the main plaza in 1986. Now it has the largest pedestrian area in France, with a total of 34km of streets, or a 160 ha pedestrian area in 2026, making it one of the biggest in Europe.
Germany	Freiburg im Breisgau	Large car-free centre (610 x 720 m). Medieval university town. Minimal car traffic is permitted on some streets. Trams provide access. Progressively pedestrianised since 1971. The neighbourhood of Vauban is considered the prototype for the Vauban model of transport planning. Some streets are "parking-space-free" (German: stellplatzfrei, rather than "car-free".
Germany	Munich	The Kaufingerstraße and Neuhauser Straße through the historic city center from Marienplatz to Stachus were pedestrianized on June 30, 1972 in time for the 1972 Summer Olympics. In 2019, the Sendlinger Straße was pedestrianized from Marienplatz to Sendlinger Tor.
Italy	Venice	The historic centre (Italian: centro storico) of Venice is divided in six sestieri ("districts") with a combined area of 7.9796 km^{2} (797.9631 ha; 7,979,631 m^{2}). Of its 129 islands, Tronchetto, Santa Chiara (which contains the Port of Venice) and the Piazzale Roma bus station square in the Santa Croce sestiere are the only islands where automobiles and busses are permitted within the historic centre; these three jointly cover 711,339 m^{2} (71.1339 ha; 0.711339 km^{2}). The rest of the Venetian Inner Islands are a pedestrian zone covering 7.268261 km^{2} (726.8261 ha; 7,268,261 m^{2}; c. 91% of the historic centre), where transport takes place on foot or by water (gondola).
Italy	Vernazza	The historic centre is pedestrian-only. Visitors must park outside the town and walk or take a bus into town.
Kazakhstan	Almaty	The Arbat, one of Kazakhstan's most popular and first pedestrian zones in Almaty, was established in Jibek Joly Street in the late 1980s. The area is lined with many shops and kiosks, as well as local artists selling their work.
Morocco	Fez	Fes el Bali, the larger of the two medieval medinas, consists of narrow streets that are inaccessible by automobile. A few access streets for emergency vehicles are being built.
Morocco	Marrakesh	The historic souks (marketplaces) in the city centre are a car-free zone. The streets are only narrow enough for pedestrians, cyclists or motorcyclists. The surrounding medina was designated a UNESCO World Heritage Site in 1985.
Netherlands	Arnhem	The pedestrian zone (Dutch: voetgangersgebied) covers the area within the boundaries of the following streets and squares: Nieuwe Plein, Willemsplein, Gele Rijdersplein, Looierstraat, Velperbinnensingel, Koningsplein, St. Catharinaplaats, Beekstraat, Walburgstraat, Turfstraat, Kleine Oord, and Nieuwe Oeverstraat.
Netherlands	Utrecht	The pedestrian zone gradually grew over the years. As of 1 August 2022, it covers the following streets and squares: Lijnmarkt, Choorstraat, Oudegracht Westzijde until Lange Viestraat, Boterstraat, Steenweg, Lange and Korte Elisabethstraat, Vredenburg, Donkerstraat, Mariastraat, Achter and Voor Clarenburg, Zakkendragerssteeg, Drieharingstraat, Hamsteeg, Bakkerstraat, Lauwersteeg, Hekelsteeg, Massegast, Vinkenburgstraat, Neude, Schoutenstraat, Oudegracht Oostzijde from Hamburgerbrug, Lichte en Donkere Gaard, Vismarkt, Stadhuisbrug, Ganzenmarkt, Wed, Oudegracht Oostzijde until Potterstraat, Drakenburgstraat, Servetstraat, Zadelstraat, Buurkerkhof, Hollandse Toren, Vlaamse Toren, Vredenburgkade, Rijnkade.
Philippines	Manila	The entirety of General Luna Street in the historic walled city of Intramuros was made pedestrianized in 2024 as part of a 9.35 km (5.81 mi) bicycle lane and walkway project of the Department of Transportation and Intramuros Administration.
Philippines	Valenzuela	A portion of Fatima Avenue, named after the National Shrine of Our Lady of Fatima and the Our Lady of Fatima University, was made pedestrianized in 2022. The pedestrianized area is also home to the annual Valenzuela Food Fiesta organized by the local government.
Taiwan	Taipei	Ximending, a shopping district with a pedestrianized area. It is the first and largest pedestrian zone in Taiwan.

== See also ==
- Carfree city
- Car-free movement
- List of car-free islands
- Low Traffic Neighbourhood
- Pedestrian malls in the United States
- Pedestrian zone
