= Gruen transfer =

Psychological phenomenon used for increasing revenue

In shopping mall design, the Gruen transfer (also known as the Gruen effect) is the moment when consumers enter a shopping mall or store and, surrounded by an intentionally confusing layout, lose track of their original intentions, making them more susceptible to making impulse buys. It is named after Austrian architect Victor Gruen, who disapproved of such manipulative techniques.

== Description ==
The Gruen transfer is a psychological phenomenon in which an idealised hyperreality is realized by deliberate reconstruction, providing a sense of safety and calm through exceptional familiarity.

In a speech in London in 1978, Victor Gruen disavowed shopping mall developments as having "bastardised" his ideas: "I refuse to pay alimony for those bastard developments." The psychologists involved in these studies found that the size and appearance of such a shopping center have a special pull effect on customers. The moment a customer enters a mall and is overwhelmed by the size, intentional clutter, and glitz of the mall, they forget their original goals and become susceptible to sales manipulation. They become an impulse buyer. Supermarkets, for example in the food industry, also use the experience of the Gruen effect to slow things down, to direct attention when placing products, or to confuse the business through frequent remodeling.

== References in other media ==
A television program on Australia's ABC TV network, called The Gruen Transfer, is named after the effect. The program discusses the methods, science and psychology behind advertising.

== History ==
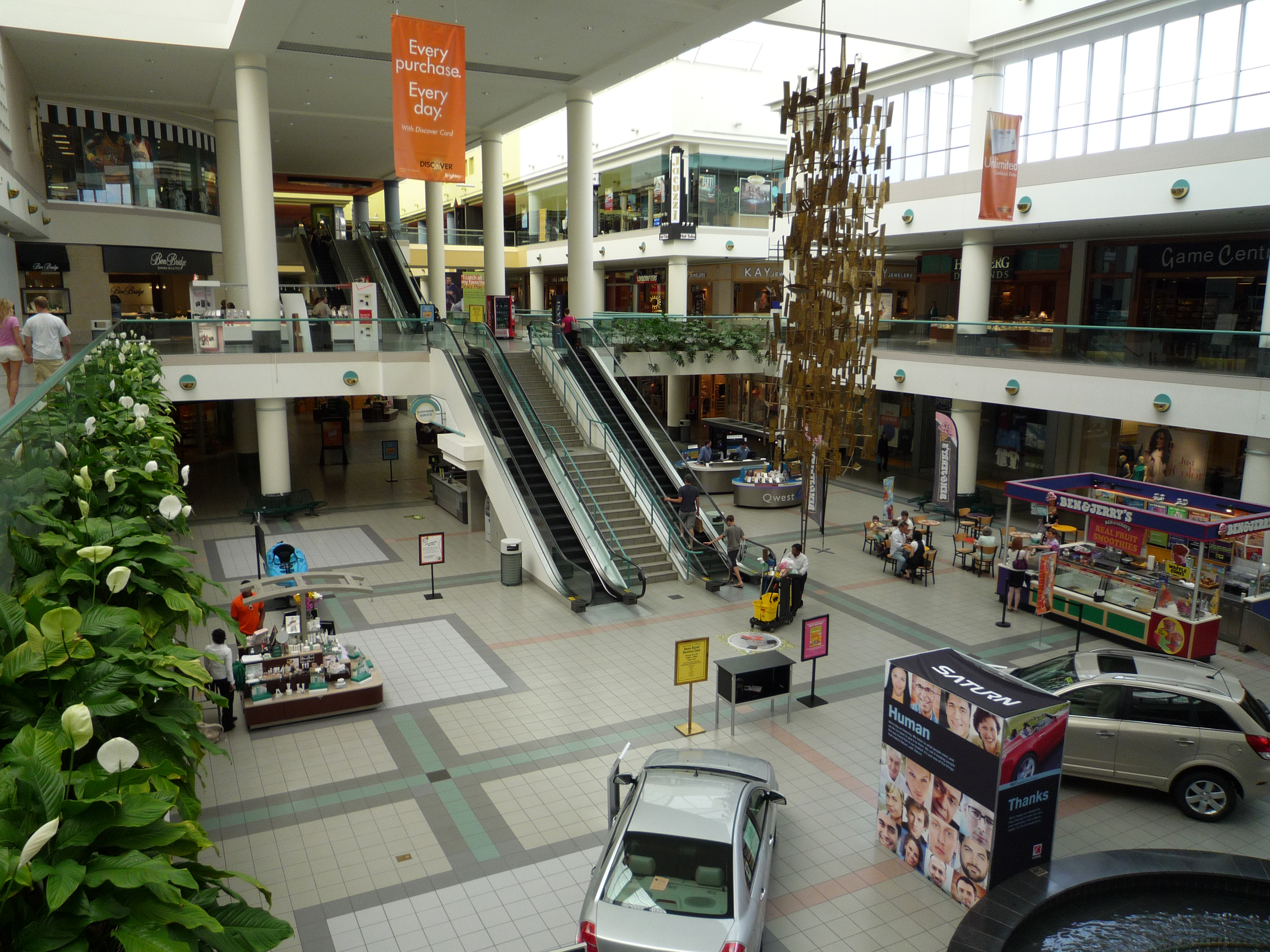
Southdale Center

In 1952, Dayton Company commissioned Victor Gruen to build the first indoor, climate controlled shopping mall, Southdale Center, in Edina, Minnesota. Southdale Center held its grand opening in 1956.

Shopping malls became very popular from the 1960s on. In many cases, they were the only air-conditioned places in a town. Numerous shopping malls opened using similar design features, and were very popular until the 1990s.
