= Elsie Caroline Krummeck =

American artist and industrial designer

- Born: December 5, 1913; New York, New York
- Died: May 29, 1999 (aged 85); Los Angeles, California
- Other name: Elsie Krummeck Crawford
- Known for: Painter
- Spouse(s): Victor Gruen, Neil Crawford

Elsie Caroline Krummeck (1913–1999) was an American artist and industrial designer.

Krummeck was born on December 5, 1913, in New York City. She attended the Parsons School of Design. She began her career by designing exhibitions for the 1939 New York World's Fair. In 1940 she married the architect Victor Gruen with whom she had two children. The couple created the firm Gruen & Krummeck. In New York the firm worked on creating specialty shops including Barton's Bonbonniere on Broadway.

The firm relocated to Los Angeles, California. There they worked on a number of commercial projects including the designing buildings for Grayson Clothing, R. H. Macy & Co., Joseph Magnin, and Milliron's. Krummeck and Gruen divorced in 1951 and their firm dissolved around the same time.

Krummeck career focused on planters, outdoor sculpture and street furniture in the L.A. Modernist style. She had an association with the Architectural Fiberglass company that produced some of her designs.

In 1958 she married the architect Herbert Neil Crawford. They divorced in 1972.

Krummeck died On May 29, 1999, in Los Angeles.

Krummeck's work was exhibited in the 1951 show Good Design at the Museum of Modern Art. Her work was also included in the 1994 show Goddess in the Details--Product Design by Women at the Pratt Institute and the 1998 exhibition L.A. Modern & Beyond at the Pacific Design Center.

Several of her pieces are in the Los Angeles County Museum of Art and the Museum of the Art Institute of Chicago.
