= Kalamazoo Mall =

Shopping center in Michigan, U.S.

Coordinates: 42.29222°N 85.58388°W

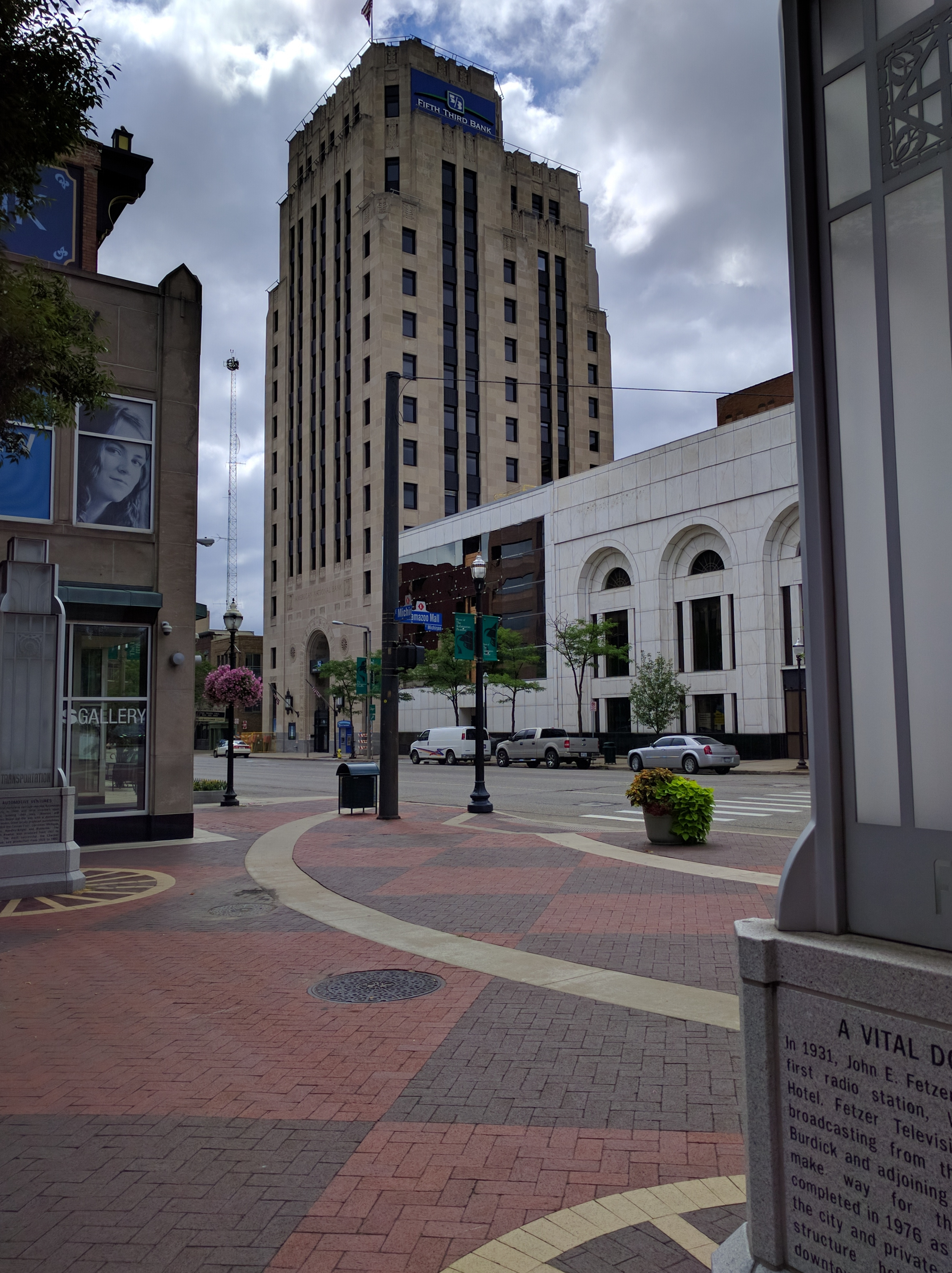
South end of Kalamazoo Mall at Michigan Avenue

The Kalamazoo Mall, the first outdoor pedestrian shopping mall in the United States, is a section of Burdick Street in downtown Kalamazoo, Michigan.

Built for $60,000 and opened in 1959, the pedestrian mall became the first of several hundred built in the United States. The bold effort to make a downtown street car-free as a spur to urban vitality and a defense against suburbanization drew national attention to Kalamazoo, which was dubbed "Mall City".

Initially, two blocks of Burdick Street were closed; a third block was added the following year and a fourth in 1975. In 1998, the southern two blocks were reopened to auto traffic, albeit a single southbound lane only.

The two blocks of Burdick from Eleanor Street to W. Michigan Avenue are designated North Kalamazoo Mall; the two blocks south of W. Michigan to W. Lovell Street, South Kalamazoo Mall.

== Early years ==
The mall was designed by Victor Gruen, who three years earlier had designed the country's first enclosed shopping mall.

A native of Austria, Gruen had been hired for Fort Worth, Texas, in 1957 to design a comprehensive plan for its city center. That plan included a pedestrian zone modeled on those of European cities. Kalamazoo officials, who were similarly seeking to reverse declines brought on by suburbanization, sought a similar plan. They hired Gruen to design a less-ambitious plan for their own downtown area.

Presented in March 1958 and dubbed Kalamazoo 1980, the plan included a ring road to encircle the downtown area and peripheral parking lots where people would leave their cars and walk through the pedestrian zone. The design resembled the Ringstrasse of his native Vienna. But Kalamazoo ultimately built only the pedestrian zone.

Construction was begun in 1958 and completed in 1959. The $60,000 cost was split between the city government and the business owners along the mall.

The mall was opened on August 19, 1959, with a ceremony that included the Jimmy Dorsey Orchestra and drew some 50,000 people.

In 1960, a third block was added to the Mall: Burdick from South Street to Lovell Street.

The Mall's initial success led several other cities to hire Gruen's firm for similar plans. The designer, however, was dissatisfied with what he regarded as a minimalist and cheap approach to revitalizing public space, and increasingly turned to enclosed malls and more elaborate transit and road designs.

== 1970s ==
In 1970 and 1971, the Mall was renovated. A plaque at the intersection of W. Michigan and Burdick reads: "The Kalamazoo Mall | First Permanent Pedestrian Mall in North America | Dedicated August 9, 1959 | Renovated 1970-1971".

In 1975, a fourth block of Burdick became car-free: between Water and Eleanor Streets.

== 1990s ==
The bloom eventually faded. Critics said the mall had too little parking nearby, exposed shoppers to bad weather, attracted crime, and held too few shops.

In the mid-1990s, Project Downtown offered a 10-point plan to revitalize Kalamazoo's downtown area, including, most contentiously, a proposal to reopen to auto traffic the two blocks of the Mall south of W. Michigan. Voters narrowly approved the plan in May 1997.

Construction began in April 1998. The street was officially reopened on October 9, 1998; ceremonies included fireworks, a visit from Michigan Governor John Engler, a big band concert like the one in 1959. A raffle was held to pick a citizen to drive the first car down the mall in four decades.

The mall has since been restyled to resemble the Arcadia Commons development at the mall's north end, where the Kalamazoo Valley Museum is located.

== See also ==
- Pedestrian malls in the United States
