= Eastland Center (Michigan) =

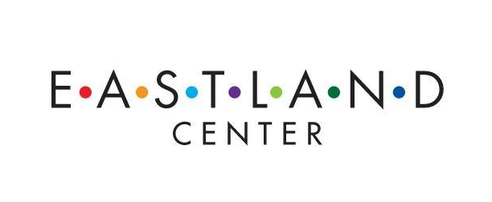

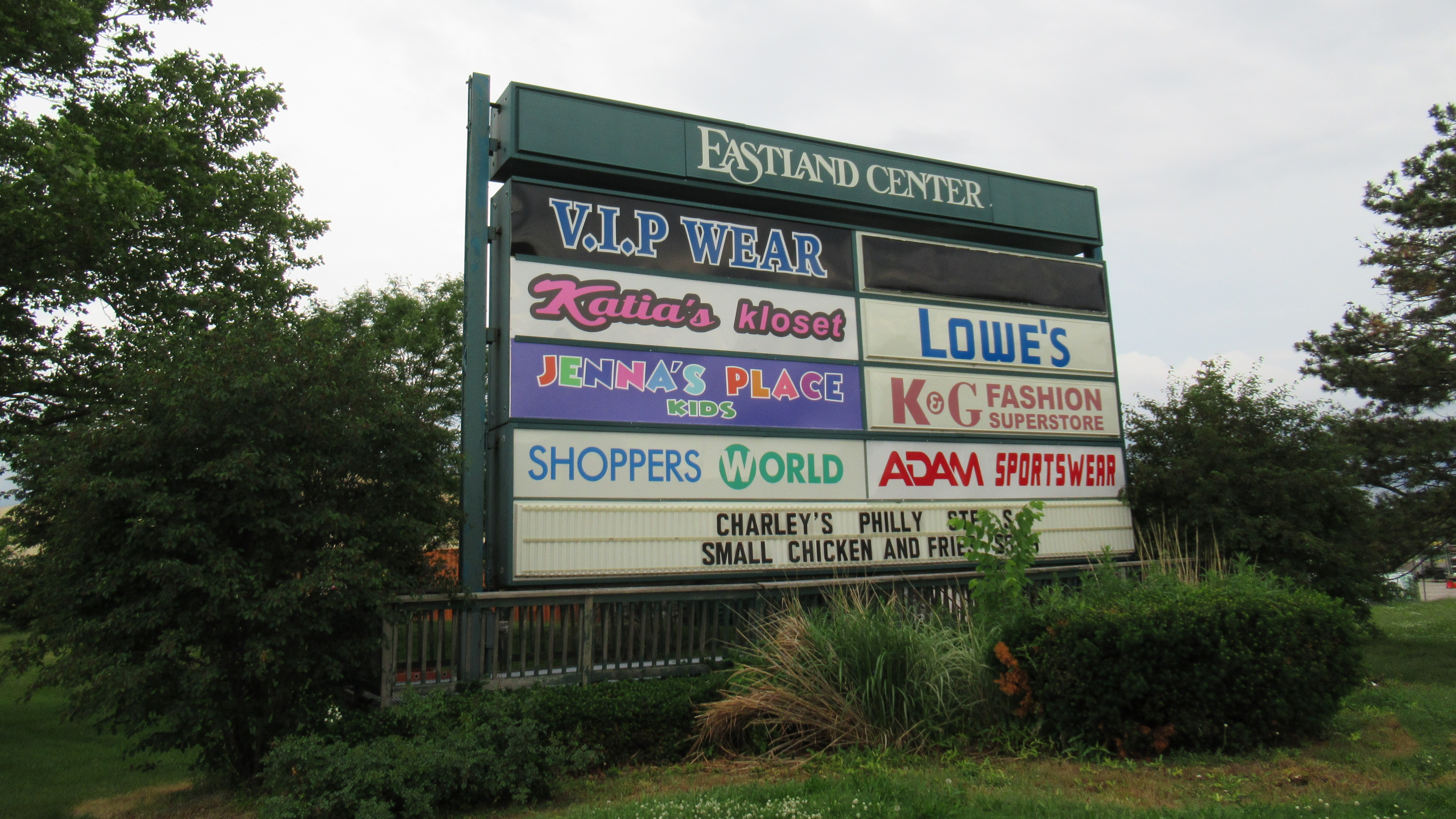
- Signage along Beaconsfield and Vernier Road
- Location: Harper Woods, Michigan, United States
- Coordinates: 42.4481°N 82.9354°W
- Opened: 1957
- Closed: November 2021
- Developer: J.L. Hudson Corporation
- Owner: NorthPoint Development
- Architect: Victor Gruen
- Num. of stores: 2
- Num. of anchor tenants: 6 (2 open, 4 vacant)
- Floor area: 1,415,557 sq ft (131,509.5 m^{2}).
- Floors: 1 with partial lower level (2 in former Sears, 4 in former Macy's)
- Parking: 7613 spaces
- Public transit: DDOT 17; SMART 610 (Sundays), 730
- Website: None

Eastland Center was an enclosed shopping mall located in the city of Harper Woods, an inner-ring suburb of Detroit, Michigan, United States. Opened in 1957, the mall expanded several times before finally closing in 2021. K&G Fashion Superstore and Shoppers World were its final anchor stores, with four other vacant anchors left by Sears, Target, Burlington, and Macy's.

== History ==
The shopping center would have been Michigan's first shopping center constructed on 8 Mile and Kelly Road, but the idea was scrapped. The mall was developed in 1957 by Hudson's, a Detroit-based department store chain (and corporate predecessor of Target Corp) that also developed Northland Center, another Detroit area mall.

In 1975, Eastland Center was enclosed, with JCPenney opening as an additional anchor store. A food court and movie theater were added to the eastern wing in 1985. MainStreet, a department store chain based in Chicago, Illinois, opened at the mall in the 1980s. The MainStreet chain was bought out and renamed by Kohl's in 1989. Kohl's closed at Eastland Center in 1995, and was replaced with Target a year later. In 1993, Eastland underwent a major renovation and expansion. As part of this renovation, Montgomery Ward was added as a new anchor. It closed in 1998, followed by JCPenney closing two years later.

=== 2000s ===
After the loss of Montgomery Ward in 1998, the mall's occupancy rate was 78%. Eastland Center was acquired by the Shopco Advisory Group in 1999, with plans for renovation; under Shopco's tenure, new stores were added. In 2001, the Hudson's was rebranded to Marshall Field's. In September 2003, Sears opened in the former JCPenney space. The same year, the mall's twin theater was demolished, with a Lowe's home improvement store (detached from the mall itself) being built on the site of the former twin theater in the northeastern corner of the property. A new, much smaller food court was created from retail space in the Sears wing. Marshall Field's, in turn, was acquired and renamed Macy's in 2006.

Steve & Barry's, a discount clothing retailer, opened on the first floor of the former Montgomery Ward store in 2004. At the time, the Eastland Center store was the second-largest Steve & Barry's in the chain. Shopco continued to manage the mall until selling it to Ashkenazy Acquisition Corporation in 2005. Jones Lang LaSalle assumed management of the mall in 2005. With the management change came some new stores, including the addition of K&G Fashion Superstore in 2006. In 2007, Target completed a renovation of its interior and exterior, as well as an expansion to accommodate a pharmacy, Starbucks, and Pizza Hut. Eastland Center announced in 2008 that Burlington Coat Factory would be added to the east end of the mall, which opened in September 2009.

=== 2010s to present ===
In 2010, the mall saw Shoppers World take over the former Steve & Barry's space. Sears closed in 2013. Just like Northland, Spinoso bought Eastland in July 2015. Macy's closed its store at the mall on March 19, 2017, after nearly sixty years of business under various nameplates. The following year, Target also closed its Eastland store on February 3, 2018. Two months later, Burlington shuttered its store at the mall in April 2018. In October 2018, the mall was sold to Kohan Retail Investment Group. Then, in June 2021, Kohan sold the mall to NorthPoint Development, who planned to demolish the mall and convert the property to warehouses and industrial buildings. The mall was slated to stay open through the holiday season, but the interior closed in November. K&G and Shopper's World remained open for the holiday season, but were closed by the time demolition began in April 2022.

=== "The Lion and Mouse" ===
One of the mall's centerpieces upon opening was a nine-foot sculpture of a lion and a mouse, titled "The Lion and Mouse" sculpted by Marshall Fredericks. In 1957, the mouse was stolen from the sculpture, only to be replaced by another mouse; in total, the sculpture has gone through no fewer than six mice. In 2007, the sculpture's original mouse was returned to the mall by the person who stole it.

== Violence ==
The mall was the location of much gang violence. On September 24, 2010, 30-year-old Cedell Leverett was shot four times as he sat outside the mall in a Mercedes. Police say someone inside a burgundy Chrysler 300 pulled the trigger. In November 2010, two people were critically wounded when two gunmen opened fire. In August 2014, two people were seriously injured by assault rifle fire in the mall parking lot. The day after Christmas 2015, a shooting occurred outside the Burlington Coat Factory at the mall, causing the mall to be locked down and later closed early. The victim of that shooting was pronounced dead at a nearby hospital, three suspects were arrested.

The area immediately west of Eastland Center, between Schoenherr and Kelly roads, has been reported by the Detroit Police Department as among the most dangerous areas in Detroit, with 2,770 reported gunshots over a 14-month period between October 2014 and December 2015, leaving residents of both Harper Woods and Detroit as well as former visitors to Eastland Center wary of gang violence.
