= Twelve Oaks Mall =

Shopping mall in Novi, Michigan, U.S.

Coordinates: 42°29′31″N 83°28′13″W

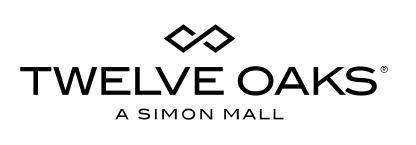

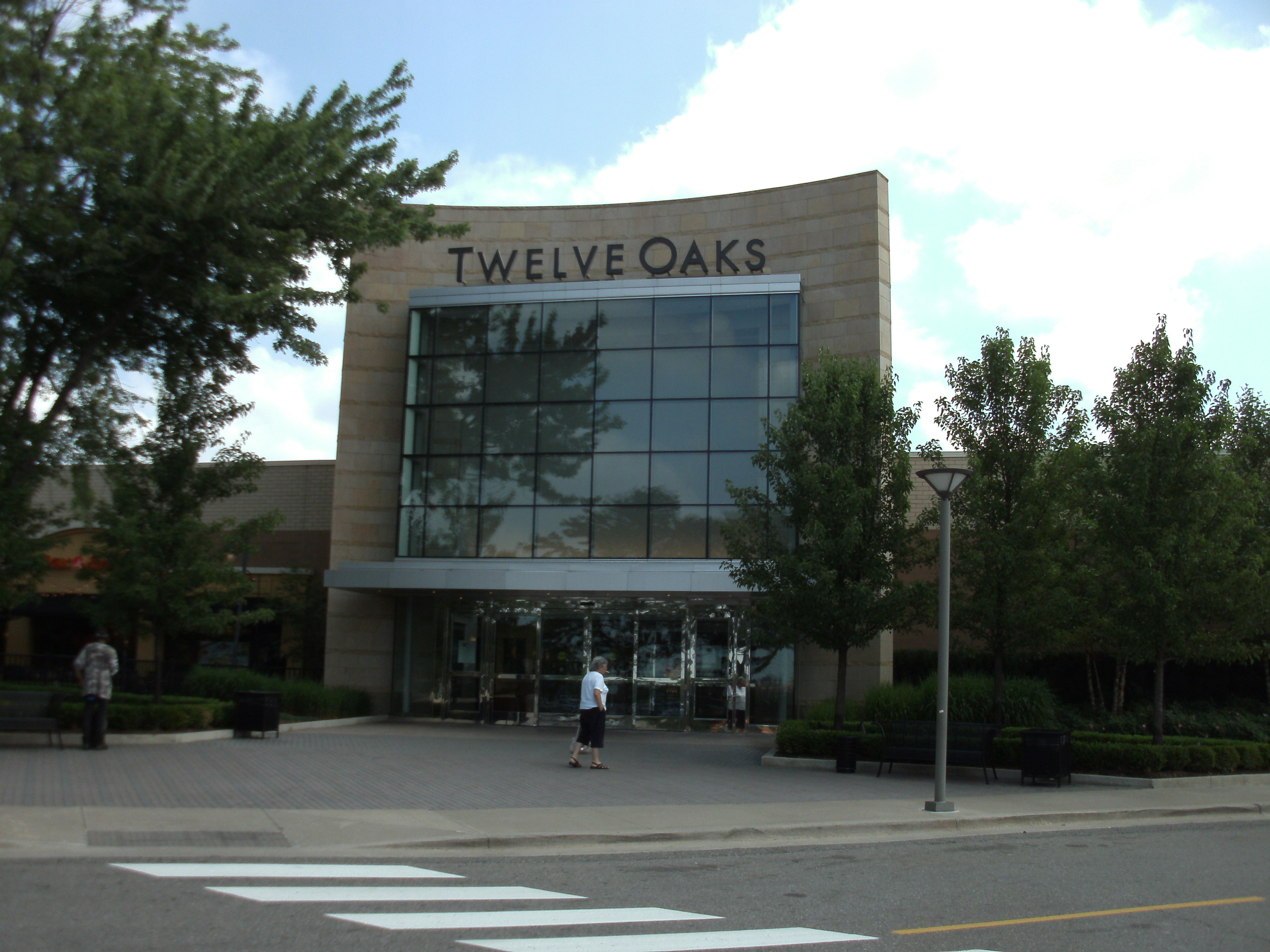
- Main entrance (July 2011)
- Location: Novi, Michigan, U.S.
- Opened: August 2, 1977; 49 years ago
- Developer: Taubman Centers, Homart Development Co., and the Dayton-Hudson Corporation
- Manager: Simon Property Group
- Owner: Simon Property Group
- Architect: Victor Gruen and Richard Prince
- Num. of stores: 185+
- Num. of anchor tenants: 3
- Floor area: 1,500,000 sq ft (140,000 m^{2})
- Floors: 2 (3 in Macy's)
- Parking: 7,051
- Public transit: SMART 740, 805
- Website: www.simon.com/mall/twelve-oaks

Twelve Oaks Mall is an enclosed super-regional shopping mall in Novi, Michigan, United States. Opened in 1977, it is anchored by Macy's, JCPenney, and Nordstrom, with a vacant anchor space last occupied by Lord & Taylor. The former Sears anchor was redeveloped into Dick's House of Sport, Primark, and Round1. It is owned and managed by the Simon Property Group, which acquired the previous owner, manager and original co-developer, Taubman Realty Group (formerly Taubman Centers) in November 2025, and is one of the largest malls in Michigan in terms of gross leasable area and total stores.

== History ==
=== Planning and opening ===
Planning for the mall began in 1967 when the J.L. Hudson Corporation purchased land at the intersection of 12 Mile and Novi roads. Prior to its development as a mall, the site was proposed to be used as a landfill. Opposition by residents and the then-Village of Novi prevented the establishment of the landfill.

Another mall proposal in Farmington Township (now Farmington Hills) was proposed by The Taubman Company and Homart Development. Sears was signed on to anchor the proposed shopping center, and Hudson's was rumored to anchor the mall as well. The mall was to be located at Thirteen Mile Road, between Haggerty and Halsted, and set to open in 1974. Opposition to the proposed mall in Farmington Township pushed the developers west to the current location in Novi.

Twelve Oaks Mall was then developed as a joint venture between A. Alfred Taubman, Homart Development, and the Dayton-Hudson Corporation, Excavation of the site began in the spring of 1975, and construction began later that fall. The mall opened on August 2, 1977, anchored by Hudson's, with Sears opening on October 1, 1977, Lord & Taylor on March 6, 1978, and finally JCPenney on May 3, 1978.

The mall was designed by Gruen Associates, founded by the pioneer of the American shopping mall Victor Gruen, and Richard Prince. The head builder was Richard Marrone. The mall is one of three super-regional Taubman malls built in Metro Detroit during the late 1970s, the other two being Lakeside Mall in Sterling Heights and Fairlane Town Center in Dearborn.

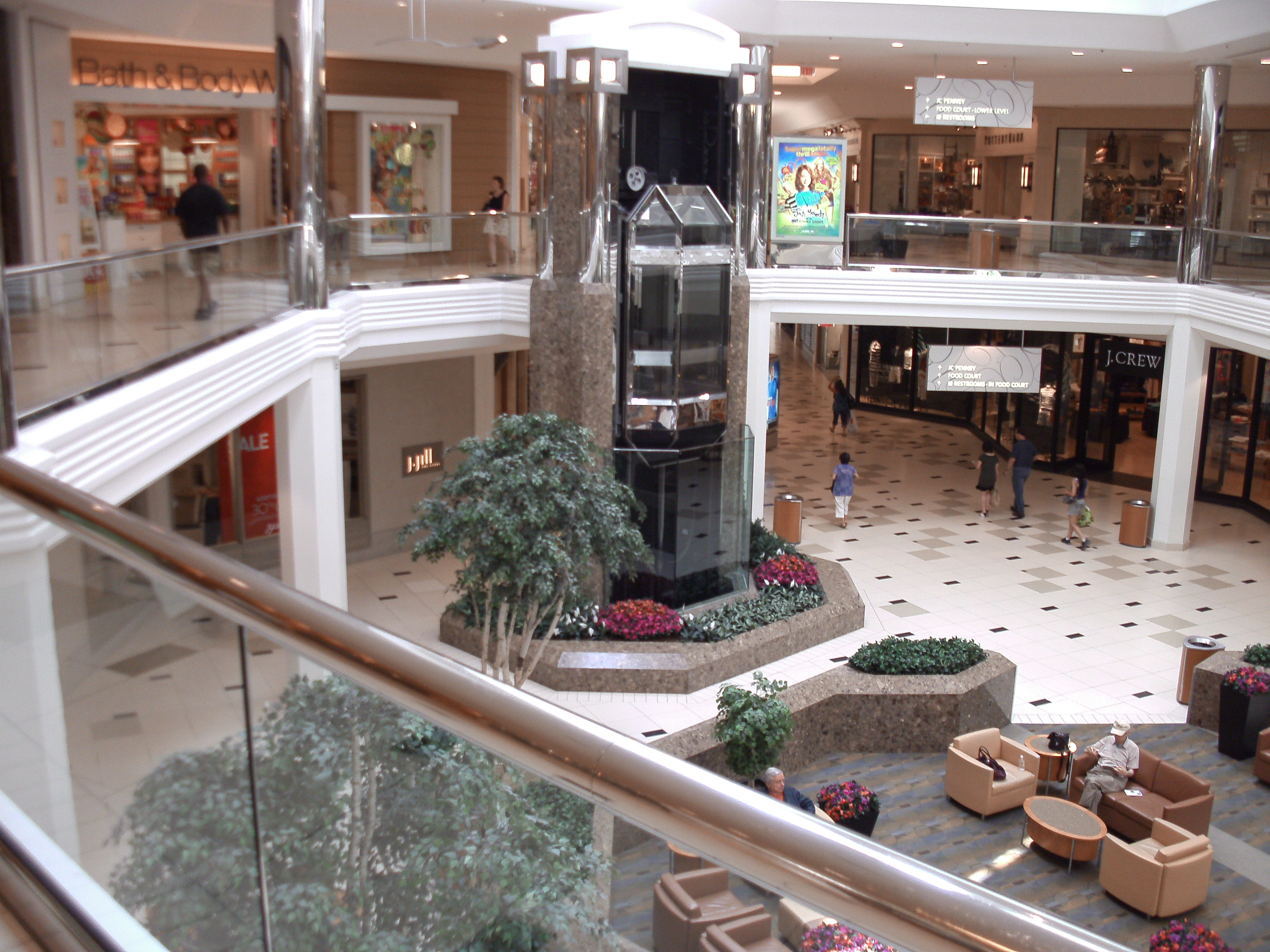
The center court in Twelve Oaks Mall

=== 21st century ===
In 2001, Hudson's converted to Marshall Field's. In 2002, The Taubman Corporation demolished the defunct United Artists Theatres and made way for a new "Lifestyle Cafe" food court, and allowed kiosks in the mall for the first time. This marked a change in Taubman policy, as it was originally believed that a food court would invite teenage loitering and that kiosks diminished the upscale atmosphere of the mall.

In 2005, The Taubman Corporation announced a $63 million expansion project, which includes a 97,000 sq ft (9,000 m^{2}) of common space, and a new 165,000 sq ft (15,300 m^{2}) Nordstrom store. The expansion made Twelve Oaks Mall one of Taubman's largest mall properties. Construction began in February 2006, with Clark Construction Company taking on the project. Also in 2006, Marshall Field's converted to Macy's, and expanded to 300,000 sq ft.

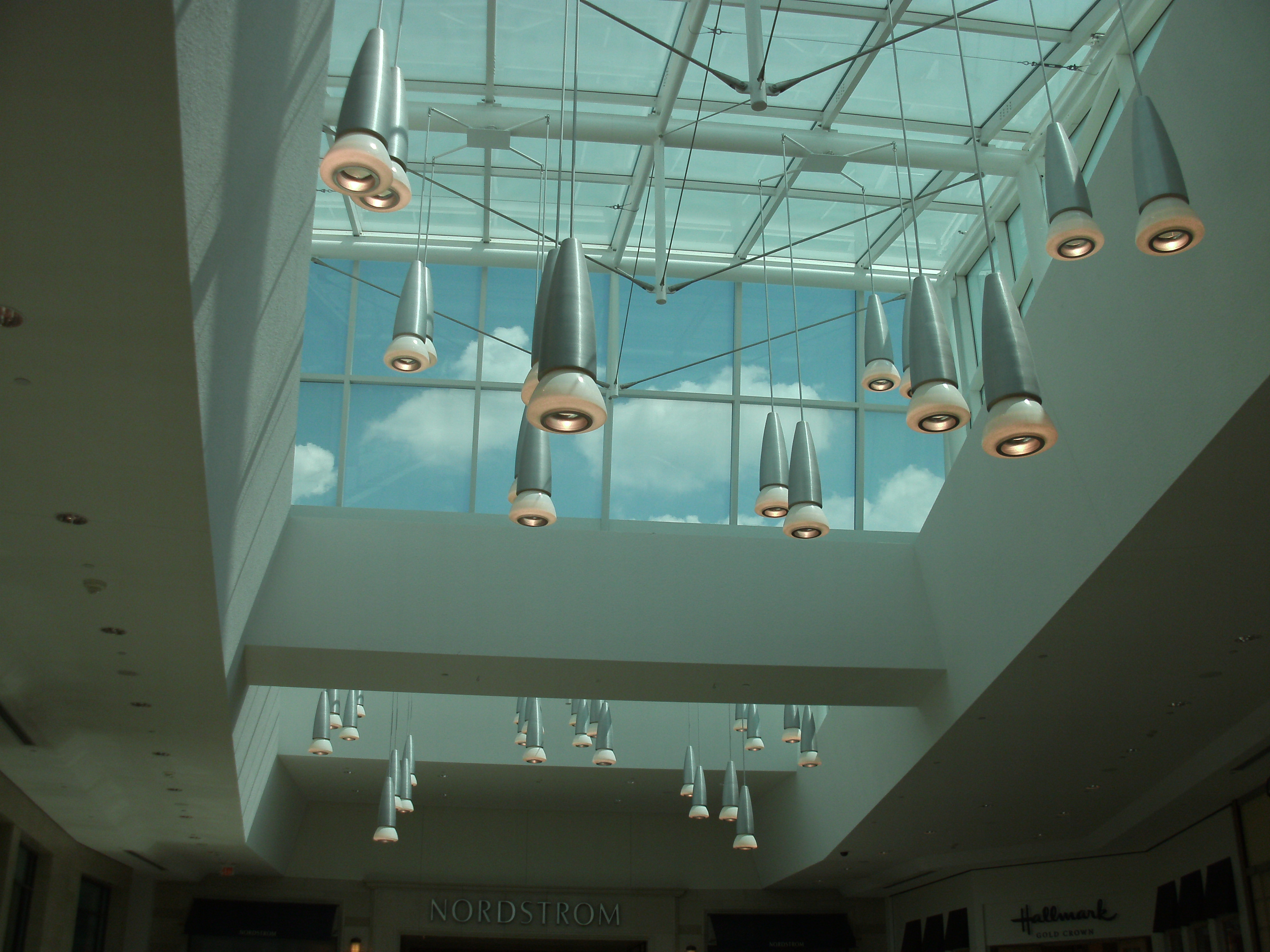
Twelve Oaks underwent renovations in 2007 that included additional internal lighting around the mall's existing skylights.

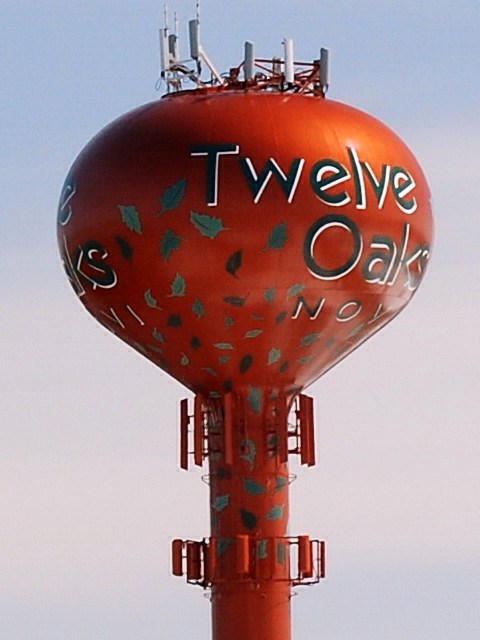
The Twelve Oaks water tower, visible from Interstate 96

In September 2007, the new Nordstrom opened with over 40 small specialty shops. The new anchor store was built on the southeast side of the mall, adjacent to the existing Lord & Taylor store.

In January 2013, The Cheesecake Factory announced that it would open at the mall later that year, and it did so on August 13, 2013.

In 2018, H&M moved to a two-floor space in the Sears wing from its original location in the JCPenney wing. It is the first two-level H&M store in Michigan.

In March 2019, it was announced that the Sears anchor store would close.

Lord & Taylor closed in 2020, as one of the last stores to close during the chain's liquidation.

In 2020, Crate & Barrel opened. A renovated temporary store opened on February 6, while the larger permanent store in the Macy's wing was being constructed.

In 2024, Dick's Sporting Goods signed a lease to open in part of the former Sears. The mall is also slated to open other major stores such as Primark and Round 1 Arcade.

== See also ==
- Architecture of metropolitan Detroit
- Metro Detroit
- Tourism in metropolitan Detroit
