= Pedestrian malls in the United States =

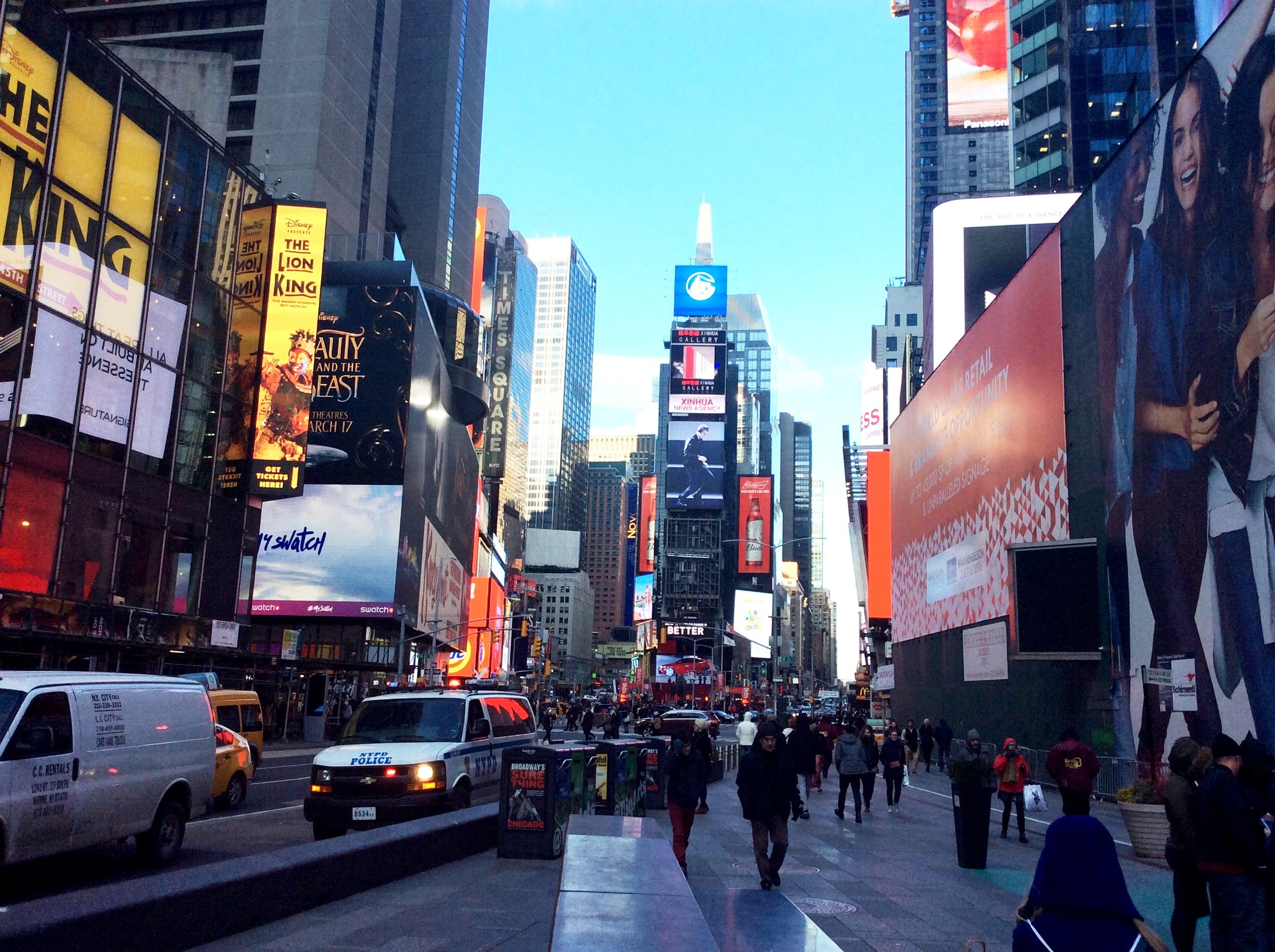
Times Square Pedestrian Mall in New York City

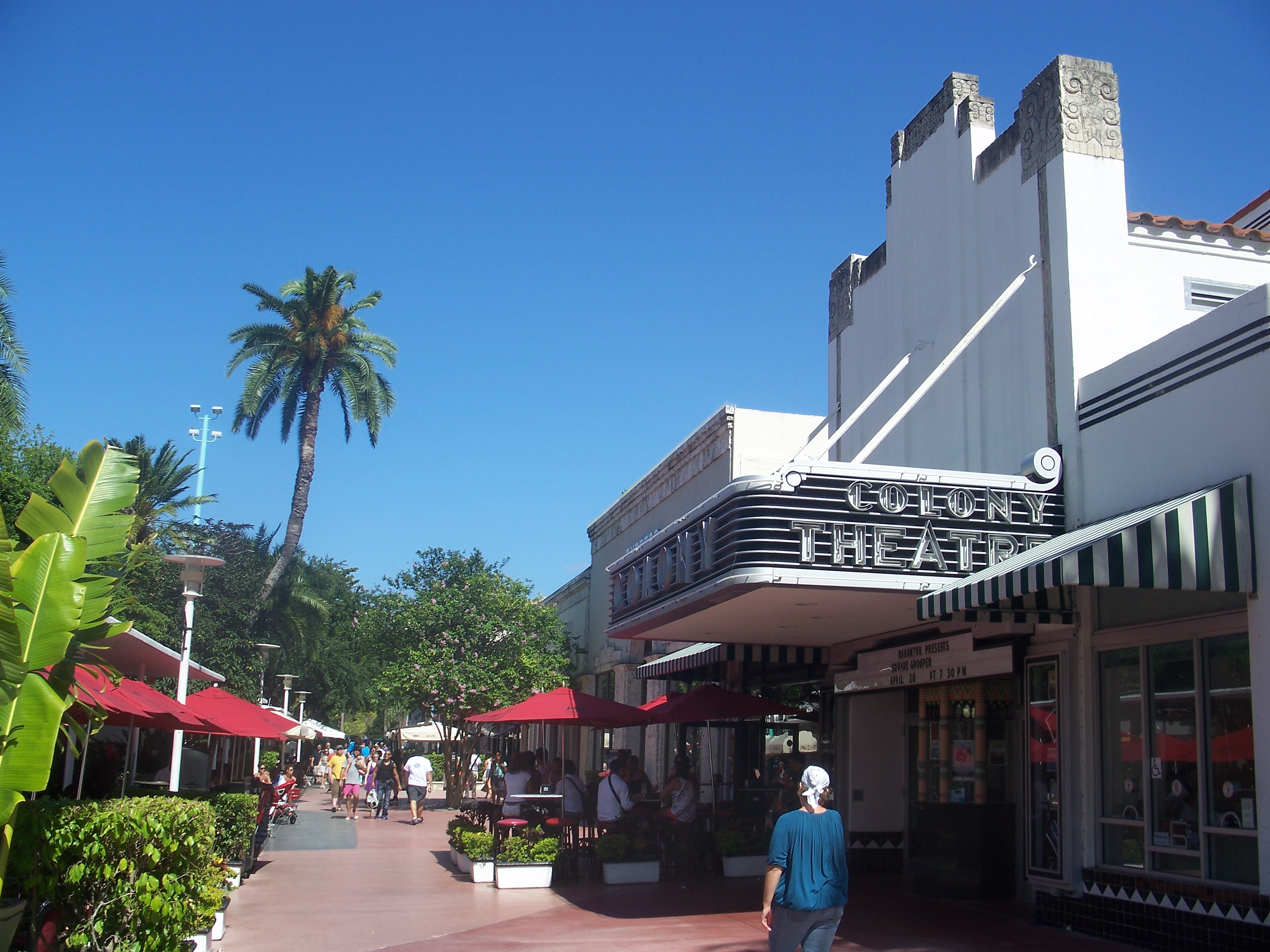
Lincoln Road in Miami Beach

Pedestrian malls, also known as pedestrian streets, are the most common form of pedestrian zone in large cities in the United States. They are typically streets lined with storefronts and closed off to most automobile traffic. Emergency vehicles may have access at all times and delivery vehicles may be restricted to either limited delivery hours or entrances on side streets.

"Pedestrian mall" as a term is most often used in the United States and Australia. "Pedestrian street" and "pedestrian zone" are the more common terms worldwide.

== History ==
Today, pedestrian malls are relatively rare in the U.S., except for areas with many tourists and other visitors. They were more closely tied to the success of retail than in Europe, and by the 1980s, most did not succeed competing with ever more elaborate enclosed malls. Almost all of this generation of pedestrian malls built from 1959 through to the 1970s, have disappeared, or were shrunk down in the 1990s at the request of the retailers. Half of Kalamazoo's pedestrian mall, America's first, has been converted into a regular street with auto traffic, though with wide sidewalks.

=== First generation (1959–1970s) ===
In 1959, Kalamazoo, Michigan, was the first American city to implement a "pedestrian mall" in its downtown core,

This became a method that some cities applied for their downtowns to compete with the growing suburban shopping malls of the time. In the 1960s and 70s over 200 towns in the United States adopted this approach.

In 2009, there were at least 75 pedestrian malls in the U.S. Besides the Kalamazoo Mall, some notable examples are the Church Street Marketplace in Burlington, Vermont; the Downtown Mall in Charlottesville, Virginia; the Third Street Promenade in Santa Monica, California; the Buffalo Place Main Street Pedestrian Mall in Buffalo, New York; Ithaca Commons in Ithaca, New York; the Pearl Street Mall in Boulder, Colorado; St. Charles, Missouri; Salem, Massachusetts; Ped Mall in Iowa City, Iowa; Lincoln Road in Miami Beach, Florida; the Fulton Mall in Fresno, California; the K Street Mall in Sacramento, California; the 16th Street Mall in Denver, Colorado; State Street in Madison, Wisconsin; Nicollet Mall in Minneapolis, Minnesota; The Grove in Los Angeles, California; Fort Street Mall in Honolulu, Hawaii; City Center in Oakland, California; Walnut Street in Des Moines, Iowa, Downtown Crossing and Faneuil Hall/Quincy Market in Boston; Washington Street Mall in Cape May, New Jersey; and The Downtown Cumberland Mall in Cumberland, Maryland. Typically these downtown pedestrian malls were three or four linear blocks simply blocked off to private street traffic, with fountains, benches, planters that doubled as seating areas, bollards, playgrounds, interfaces to public transit and other amenities installed to attract shoppers.

Many were later re-converted to accommodate automobile traffic within twenty years.

=== Surviving first generation pedestrian malls ===
Most of these areas are still popular attractions today. The Pearl Street Mall in Boulder continues to thrive with its college crowd atmosphere and the Third Street Promenade in Santa Monica thrives on tourist traffic. The Downtown Mall in Charlottesville, Virginia, now a vital business, entertainment, and retail area, spent roughly twenty years as a somewhat depressed stretch until an ice skating rink and multiplex opened on it in the mid-1990s. Broadway St. in Eugene, Oregon, is finally being developed with a hotel, movie theater, and retail after decades of limited economic activity following its experiment with a pedestrian mall.

The Federal Plaza in Downtown Youngstown, Ohio is a similar case. Since the unsuccessful Federal Plaza has been ripped up and redesigned in 2004, the city of Youngstown has seen the development of a new entertainment district erupt. A new arena, two new courthouses, federal buildings, bistros and other new night-spots have placed themselves in Youngstown's core.

Burlington, Vermont's Church Street Marketplace has been expanded from the original three blocks to four, encompassing the entirety of the city's commercial "main street," and remains a thriving cultural center with shops, restaurants, vendor carts, sidewalk performers and special events which does not appear to be affected by the development of big box store farms in neighboring Williston.

Poughkeepsie, New York, on the other hand, has reverted its Main Mall to vehicular traffic, having failed at maintaining a place pedestrians wanted to be. It was, at least in part, Poughkeepsie's initial success which convinced Burlington to proceed with its Marketplace project.

=== New generation ===
In 1989, Santa Monica, California on the Westside of Los Angeles, renovated and relaunched its 1960s-era pedestrian mall as the Third Street Promenade, and renovated both the adjacent Santa Monica Pier and adjacent enclosed mall, Santa Monica Place, all together helping to draw both domestic and international visitors and locals from across Greater Los Angeles locals.

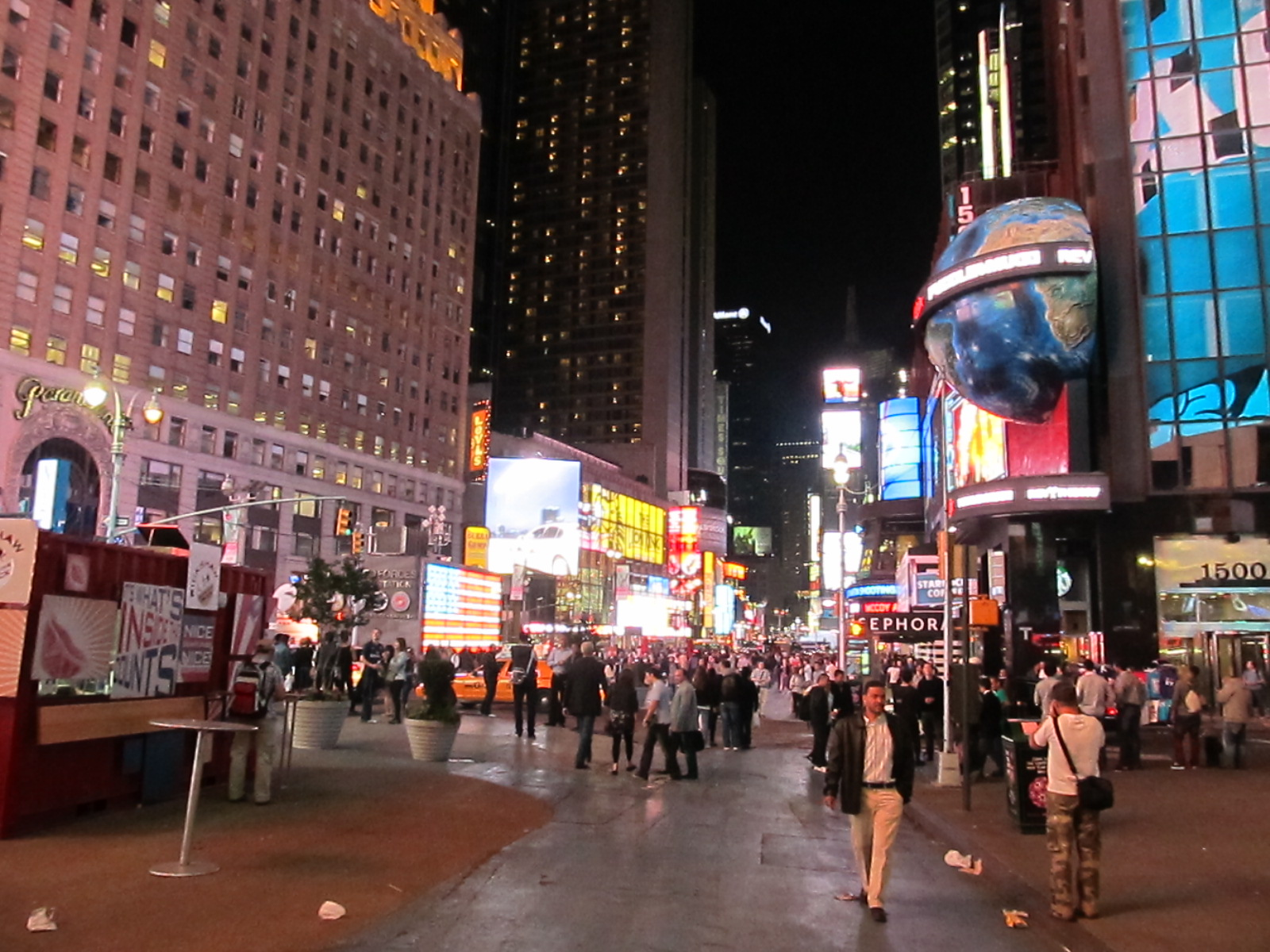
Pedestrianized area in Times Square, New York City

In the mid-2010s, former New York Mayor Michael Bloomberg worked during his final term in office to create pedestrian malls in major tourist centers that had also been areas of severe automobile congestion such as Times Square and Herald Square.

=== Unconventional examples ===
==== Las Vegas ====
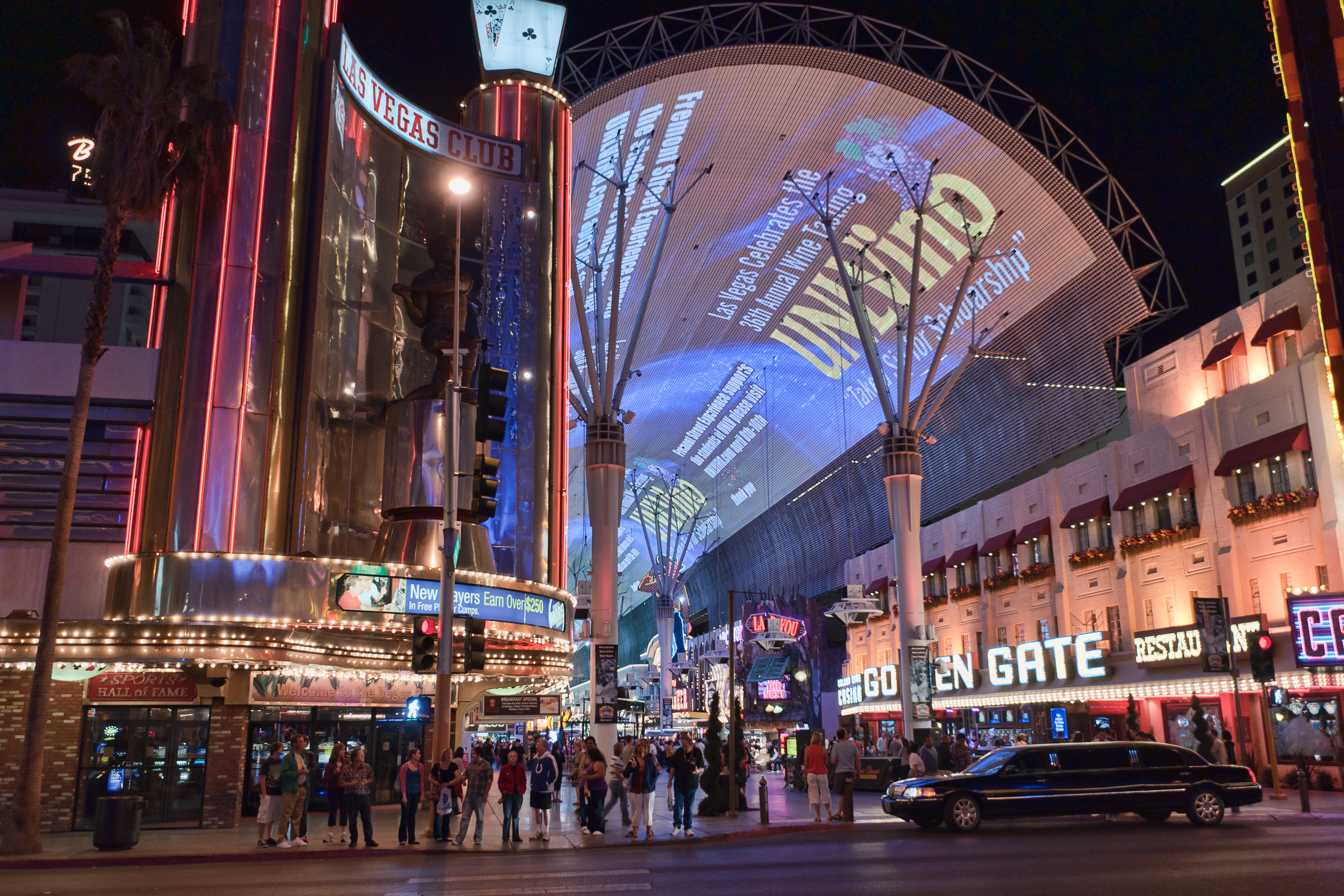
Fremont Street Experience in Las Vegas with the neon lights on

In 1994–1995, Las Vegas pedestrianized and covered its main downtown street, lined with smaller casinos, and created the Fremont Street Experience.

==== San Antonio ====
The San Antonio River Walk is a special-case pedestrian street, one level down from the automobile street. The River Walk winds and loops under bridges as two parallel sidewalks lined with restaurants and shops, connecting the major tourist draws from Alamo Plaza to Rivercenter, to HemisFair Plaza, to the Transit Tower. Most downtown buildings have street entrances and separate river entrances one level below. This separates the automotive service grid (delivery and ambulance/police vehicles) from pedestrian traffic below, provides bridges, walkways, and staircases, and attempts to balance retail, commercial, office, green space and cultural uses.

=== During the COVID-19 pandemic in the United States ===
During the COVID-19 pandemic in the United States some cities pedestrianized additional streets in order to encourage social distancing and in many cases to provide extra rooms for restaurants to serve food on patios extended into the newly available spaces. In New York, this was applied to up to 100 miles of streets across the city.

== List of pedestrian malls ==
| Mall name | State | City |
|---|---|---|
| Buchannan Street | California | San Francisco |
| Campanile Mall | California | San Diego |
| Golden Mall (1967–1989) | California | Burbank |
| Santee Alley | California | Los Angeles |
| Oakland City Center | California | Oakland |
| Pomona Mall (1962–present, reduced in length 1977) | California | Pomona |
| Redding Mall (1970–2021) | California | Redding |
| Main Street (1966–present) | California | Riverside |
| K Street | California | Sacramento |
| Third Street Promenade (1965–present) | California | Santa Monica |
| West Main Street | California | Stockton |
| Olde Town | Colorado | Arvada |
| Hyman Ave/Mill St/Cooper Ave | Colorado | Aspen |
| Pearl Street Mall | Colorado | Boulder |
| 16th Street Mall | Colorado | Denver |
| Old Town Square | Colorado | Ft. Collins |
| Palmer Alley | District of Columbia | Washington |
| Lincoln Road (1960–present) | Florida | Miami Beach |
| St. George Street | Florida | St. Augustine |
| Upper Alabama Street in Underground Atlanta complex | Georgia | Atlanta |
| Savannah City Market | Georgia | Savannah |
| Fort Street Mall | Hawaii | Honolulu |
| Walnut Street | Iowa | Des Moines |
| The Ped Mall | Iowa | Iowa City |
| Commercial Street | Kansas | Atchison |
| Exchange Place | Louisiana | New Orleans |
| Fulton Street | Louisiana | New Orleans |
| Old Town Mall | Maryland | Baltimore |
| Downtown Cumberland Mall | Maryland | Cumberland |
| Faneuil Hall Marketplace | Massachusetts | Boston |
| Front Street | Massachusetts | New Bedford |
| Inn Street Mall | Massachusetts | Newburyport |
| Essex Mall | Massachusetts | Salem |
| Maine Way Mall/Monument Sq | Maine | Portland |
| Kalamazoo Mall | Michigan | Kalamazoo |
| Nicollet Mall (1967–present) | Minnesota | Minneapolis |
| North 14th Street Mall (1977–2008) | Missouri | St. Louis |
| Last Chance Gulch | Montana | Helena |
| Downtown Mall | New Hampshire | Lebanon |
| Washington Street Mall | New Jersey | Cape May |
| Newark Avenue Pedestrian Mall | New Jersey | Jersey City |
| Fremont Street Experience | Nevada | Las Vegas |
| Washington Street | New York | Binghamton |
| Buffalo Place | New York | Buffalo |
| Ithaca Commons | New York | Ithaca |
| 165th Street | New York | Jamaica, Queens |
| Times Square | New York | New York |
| Jay Street Pedestrian Walkway | New York | Schenectady |
| Fountain Square Plaza Mall | Ohio | Cincinnati |
| Cuyahoga Falls Riverfront Square District | Ohio | Cuyahoga Falls |
| Long Wharf Mall | Rhode Island | Newport |
| Main Street Mall | Tennessee | Memphis |
| Akard Street Mall | Texas | Dallas |
| Browder Street Plaza | Texas | Dallas |
| Stone Place | Texas | Dallas |
| Avenida Houston | Texas | Houston |
| GreenStreet | Texas | Houston |
| Main Street Square | Texas | Houston |
| Downtown Mall | Virginia | Charlottesville |
| Duke of Glouchester Street | Virginia | Williamsburg |
| Old Town Winchester | Virginia | Winchester |
| Church Street Marketplace | Vermont | Burlington |
| Occidental Avenue, Pioneer Square | Washington | Seattle |
| Southport Mall (1975–1992) | Wisconsin | Kenosha |
| State Street | Wisconsin | Madison |

== Urban renewal ==
In the last decades of the 20th century many urbanists such as Jan Gehl and Peter Calthorpe have listed and explained what they see as the virtues of pedestrian streets. Urban renewal activists have often pushed for the creation of auto-free zones in parts or in all of the sectors of a metropolitan area.

== Legal status ==
In some locations, the definition of a pedestrian mall is codified. Examples include Las Vegas and Riverside, California.

== Environmental impacts ==
Pedestrian malls are streets that have limited or prohibited motor vehicle access, with the intent to create a walking zone. This may be done to create a safer environment in areas that have high pedestrian traffic, to reduce the noise and pollution levels, or to increase exercise levels by encouraging walking.

== See also ==
- List of pedestrian zones
- Pedestrian zone
