= Westland Shopping Center =

Shopping mall in Westland, Michigan, United States

Westland Center
- Westland Center's Logo
- Location: 35000 Warren Road Westland, Michigan 48185 United States
- Coordinates: 42.3408°N 83.3898°W
- Opened: July 28, 1965
- Developer: J.L. Hudson Corporation
- Manager: Namdar Realty Group
- Owner: Namdar Realty Group
- Architect: Victor Gruen; Louis G. Redstone
- Num. of stores: 60+
- Num. of anchor tenants: 4 (2 open, 2 vacant)
- Floor area: 1,056,696 ft²
- Floors: 1 with small mezzanine and terrace (2 in JCPenney and Kohl’s (basement is private), 2 in former Sears, and 4 in former Macy’s)
- Parking: 4,560
- Public transit: SMART 210, 250
- Website: www.westlandcenter.com

Westland Shopping Center is an enclosed regional shopping mall in Westland, Michigan. The mall is anchored by JCPenney and Kohl's, and has more than 60 inline stores. It opened on July 28, 1965, and is currently owned by Namdar Realty Group.

== History ==
Westland Center was developed by J.L. Hudson Corporation. It was designed by Victor Gruen Associates and Louis G. Redstone Associates.

Westland Center played a role in local history. During the early 1960s, the city of Livonia planned to annex the part of Nankin Township where the mall was to be built. The shopping center eventually opened on July 28, 1965, joining Northland and Eastland malls in other Metro Detroit cities. In reaction to Livonia's annexation attempts, the people of Nankin Township voted to incorporate the remainder of the township as a city on May 16, 1966, known as the City of Westland, naming it after the mall.

Initial mall tenants included a four-story Hudson's department store, a Kroger grocery store, and a S.S. Kresge five-and-dime store located in the west court. JCPenney joined the mall as a second anchor in 1976. In 1987, MainStreet joined the mall, becoming Kohl's one year later. Sears was first proposed as a new anchor in 1991 and opened in 1997, becoming the first Sears to open in Metro Detroit in over 20 years. In 2001, Hudson's was converted to Marshall Field's, which in turn became Macy's in 2006. In 2014, Westland received a major renovation. Bath & Body Works and Victoria's Secret were remodeled, while ULTA Beauty, Charming Charlie, and Shoe Carnival opened.

Macy's announced in January 2017 that its Westland Center store would close, as part of a plan to close 68 stores nationwide. The store closed on March 19, 2017. Later in June 2021, Sears announced that it would close its store at Westland Center, then the last remaining Sears store in Michigan. The store closed permanently on August 15, 2021, leaving JCPenney and Kohl's as the only remaining anchors.

== Gallery ==
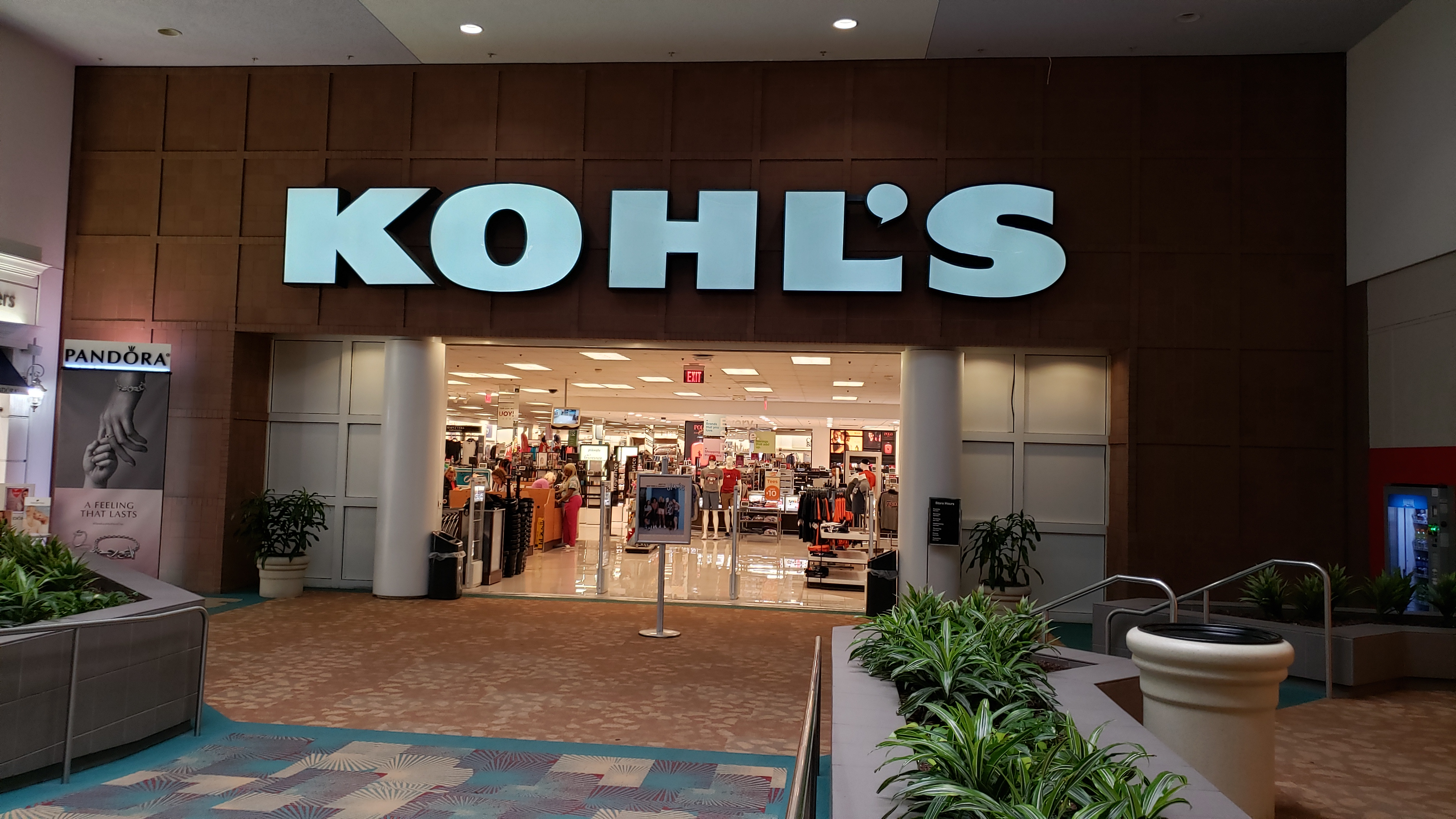
Kohl's (former MainStreet) entrance

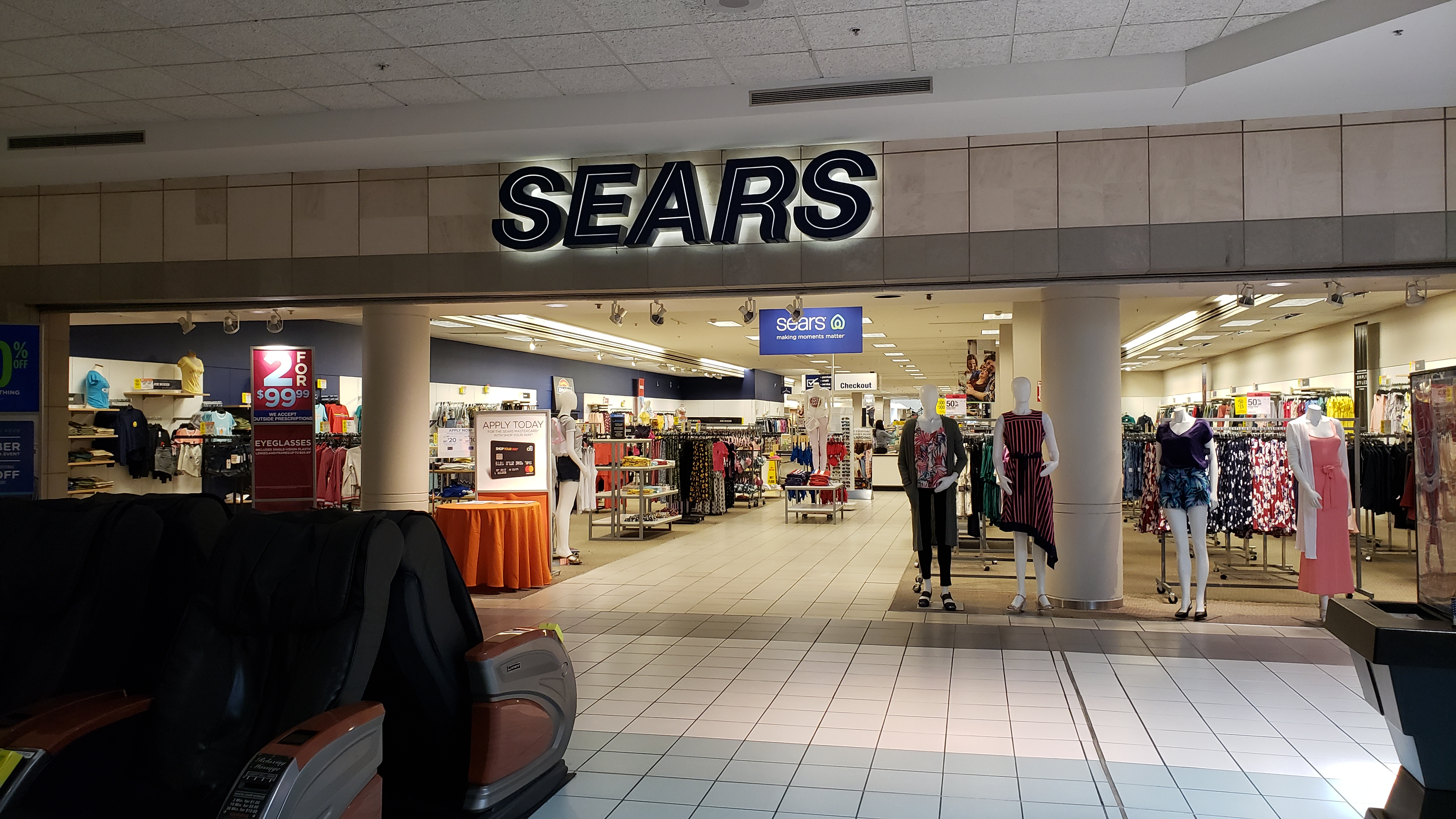
Sears entrance (now closed)

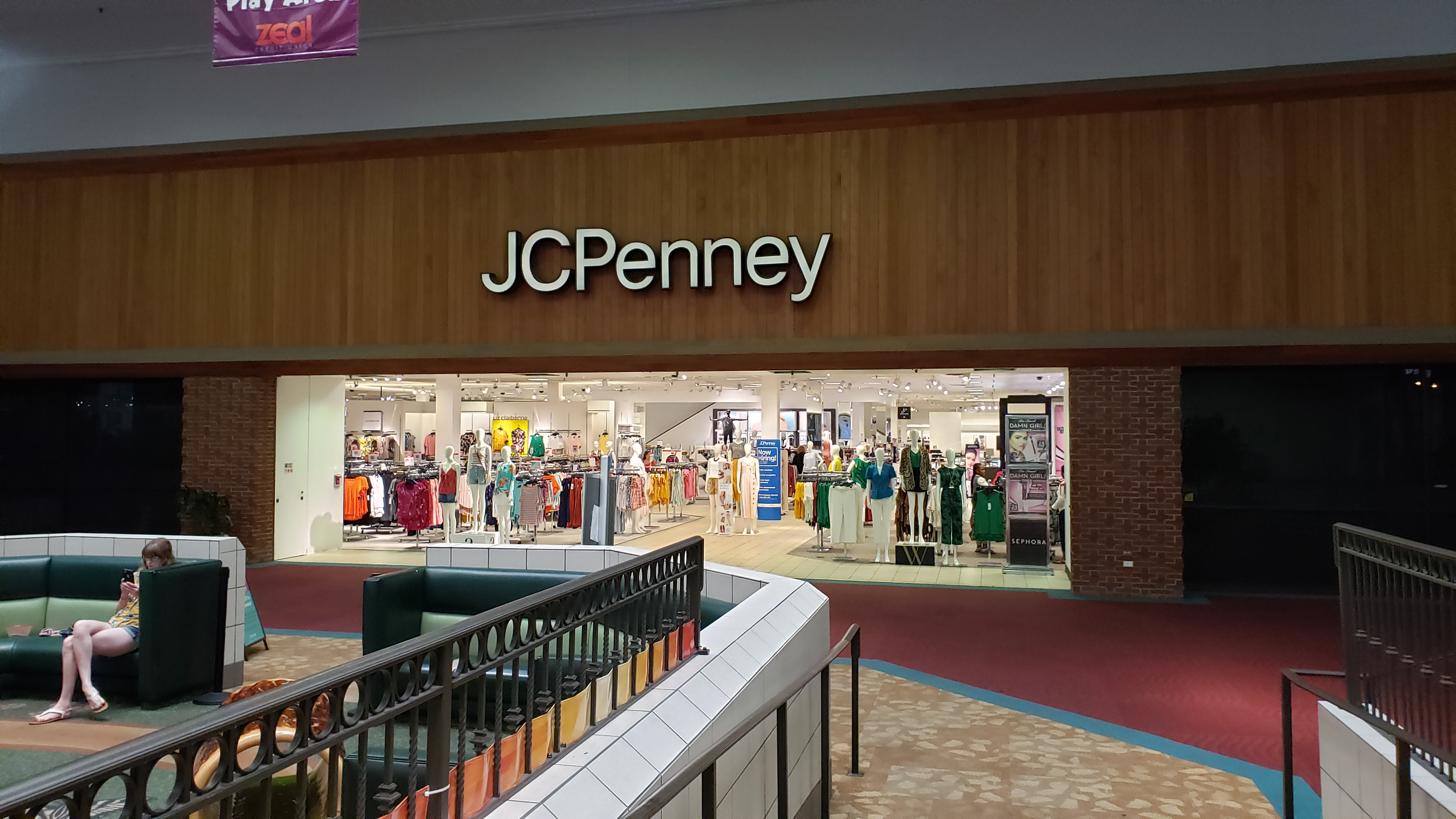
JCPenney entrance

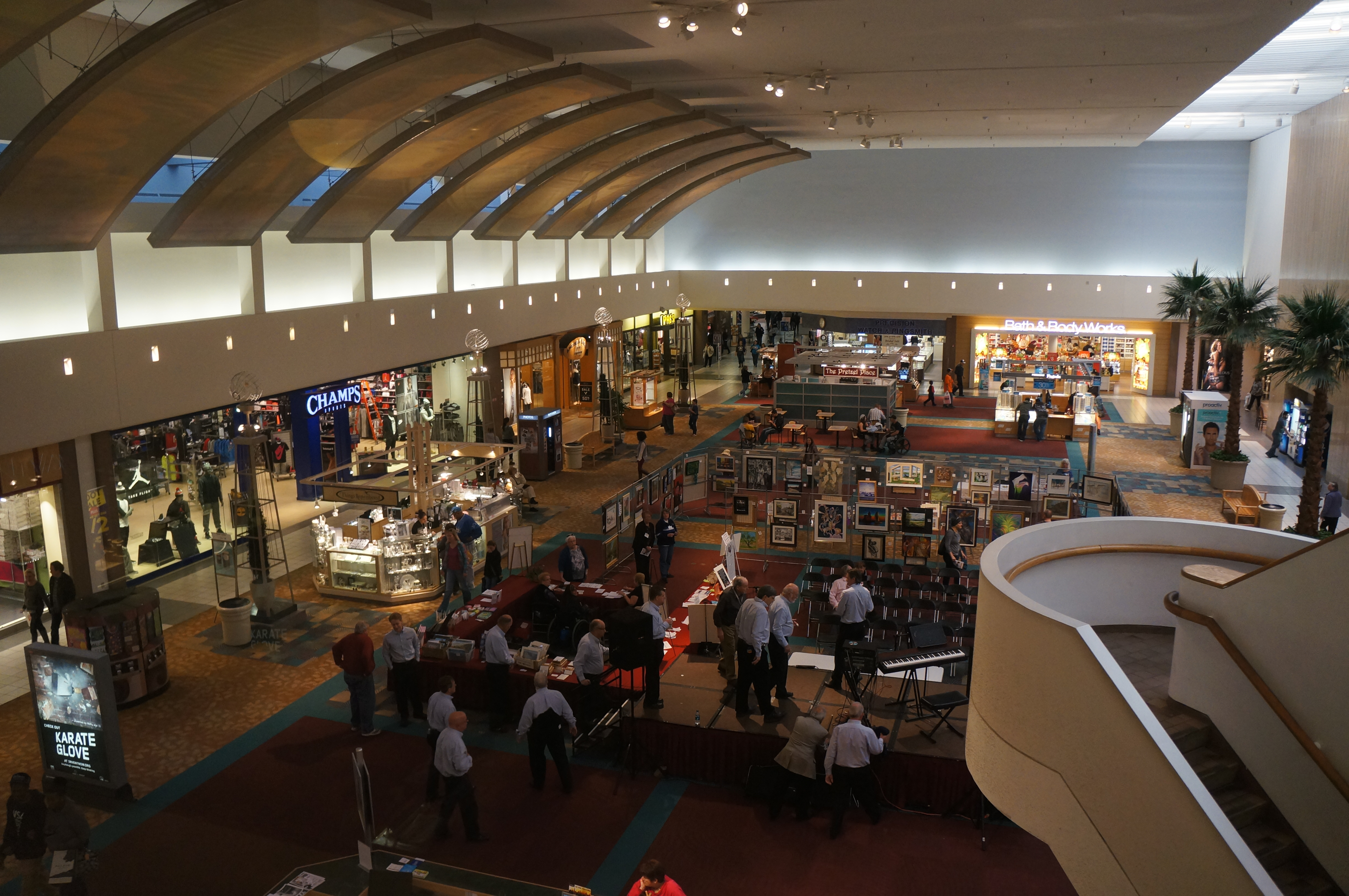
East lobby

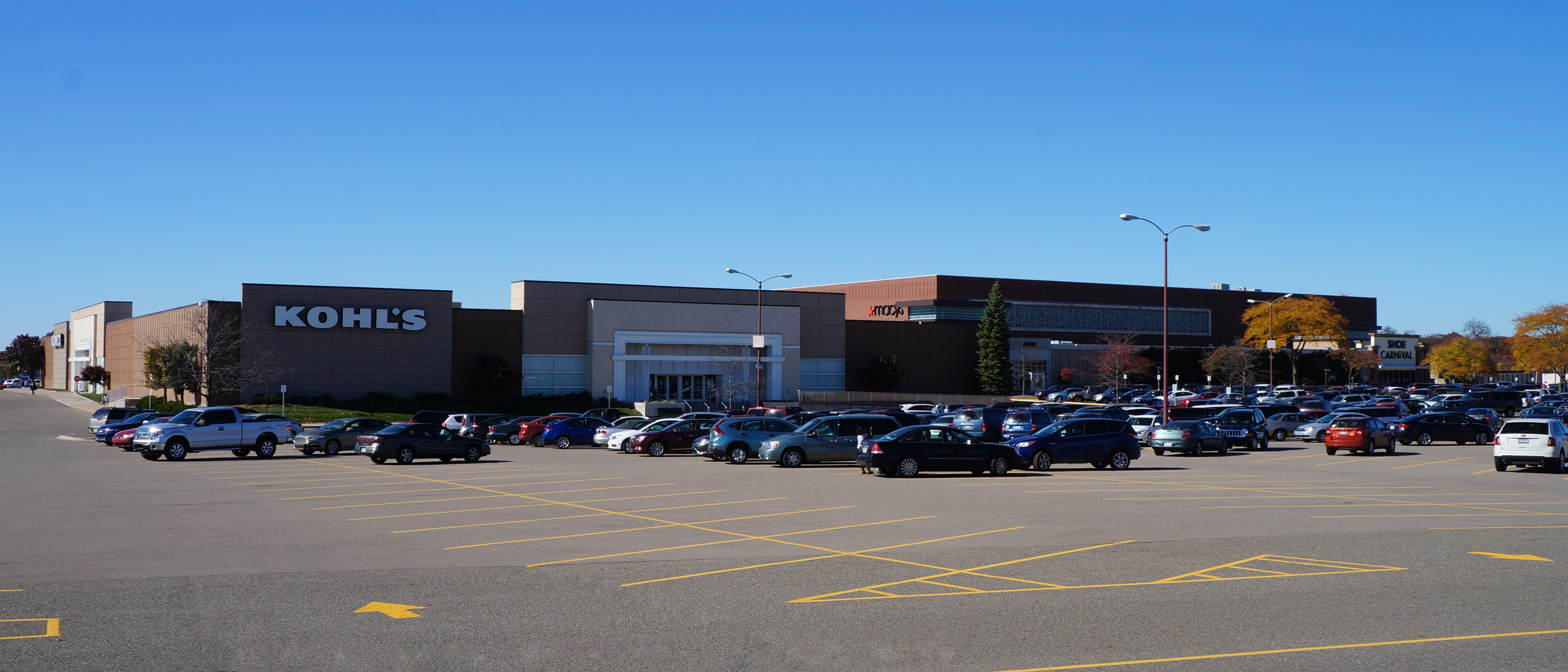
Eastern exterior
