= Bailian Xijiao Shopping Mall =

Shopping mall in Shanghai, China

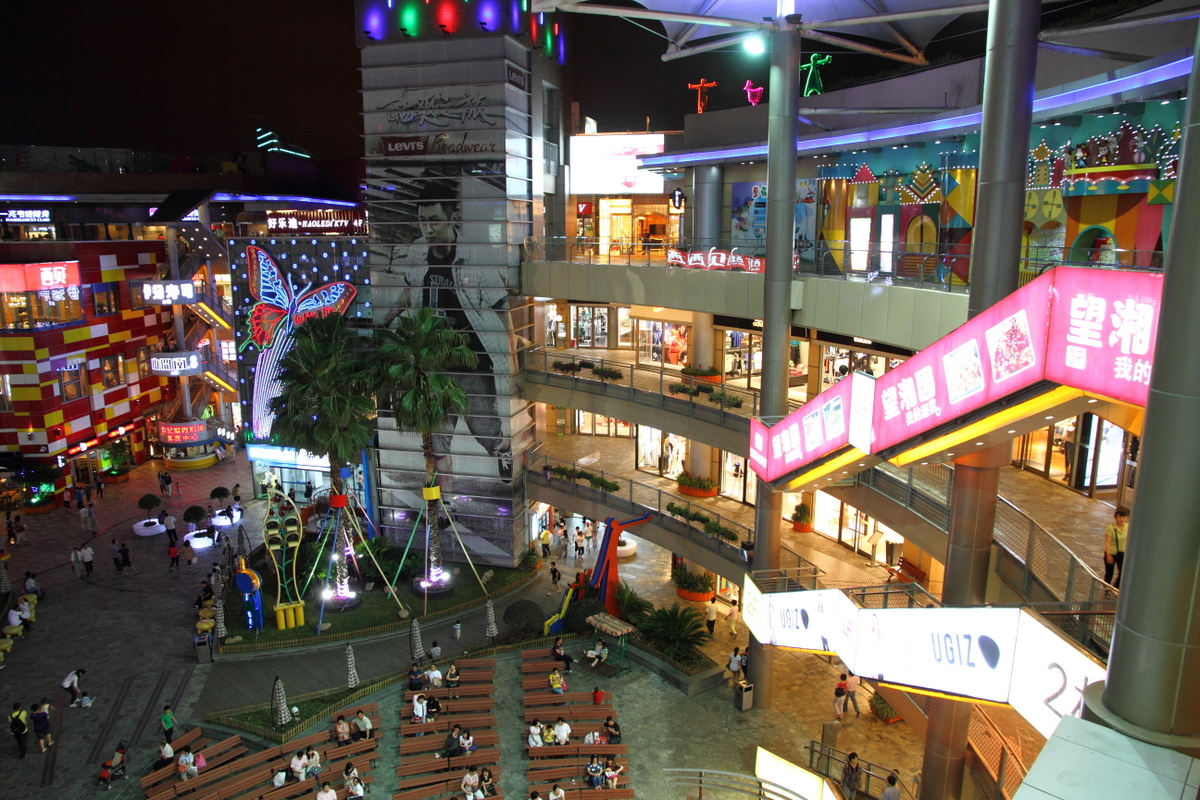
- Bailian Xijiao Shopping Mall in Shanghai, at 109,000 square metres (1,170,000 sq ft) a super-regional shopping center or mall
- Coordinates: 31.2092251°N 121.3703637°E
- Address: No. 88 Xianxia Road, Changning District
- Owner: Bailian Group

Bailian Xijiao Shopping Mall (Chinese: 百联西郊购物中心) is a large outdoor shopping center classified as a super-regional shopping mall, in Shanghai, China and a key reference point in the modern commercial development of the Changning area and the western suburbs (Xijiao) in general. It is located at No. 88 Xianxia Road, Changning District. It is owned and built by Bailian Group. Anchors include supermarkets, department stores, professional stores, themed restaurants, specialty stores, entertainment and fitness and gyms including the Friendship Department Store, Century Lianhua, HOLA Teli House, Decathlon, and Yongle Home Appliances. The leasable area is 109,000 square metres (1,170,000 sq ft), placing it in the super-regional mall/shopping center category. It opened in 2004 as the first open-air mall in China.

The center underwent extensive renovation starting in July 2022, and reopened in December 2023. Most of the original stores like Century Lianhua, HOLA Teli House, Decathlon, and Yongle Home have since left the complex.

The renovations were a reaction to increasing consumer demands and competition. They included covering the center to protect shoppers from wind and rain, and providing better pedestrian circulation.

The mall's new core concept centers around three physical curves, all expressing themes of health, vitality and sustainability. The first curve is a layered "floating belt" with plants connecting the buildings to the adjacent streets and waterfront; The second curve centers around experiential merchants, creating an organic "life circle"; the third curve consists of social meeting places which leverage digital intelligence, and aim to strengthen a "sense of belonging". Within the curve concept, six major lifestyle sections were established: pet-friendly, elegant, gourmet, social gathering, quality, and healthy.
