= Shopping center =

Commercial trading complex

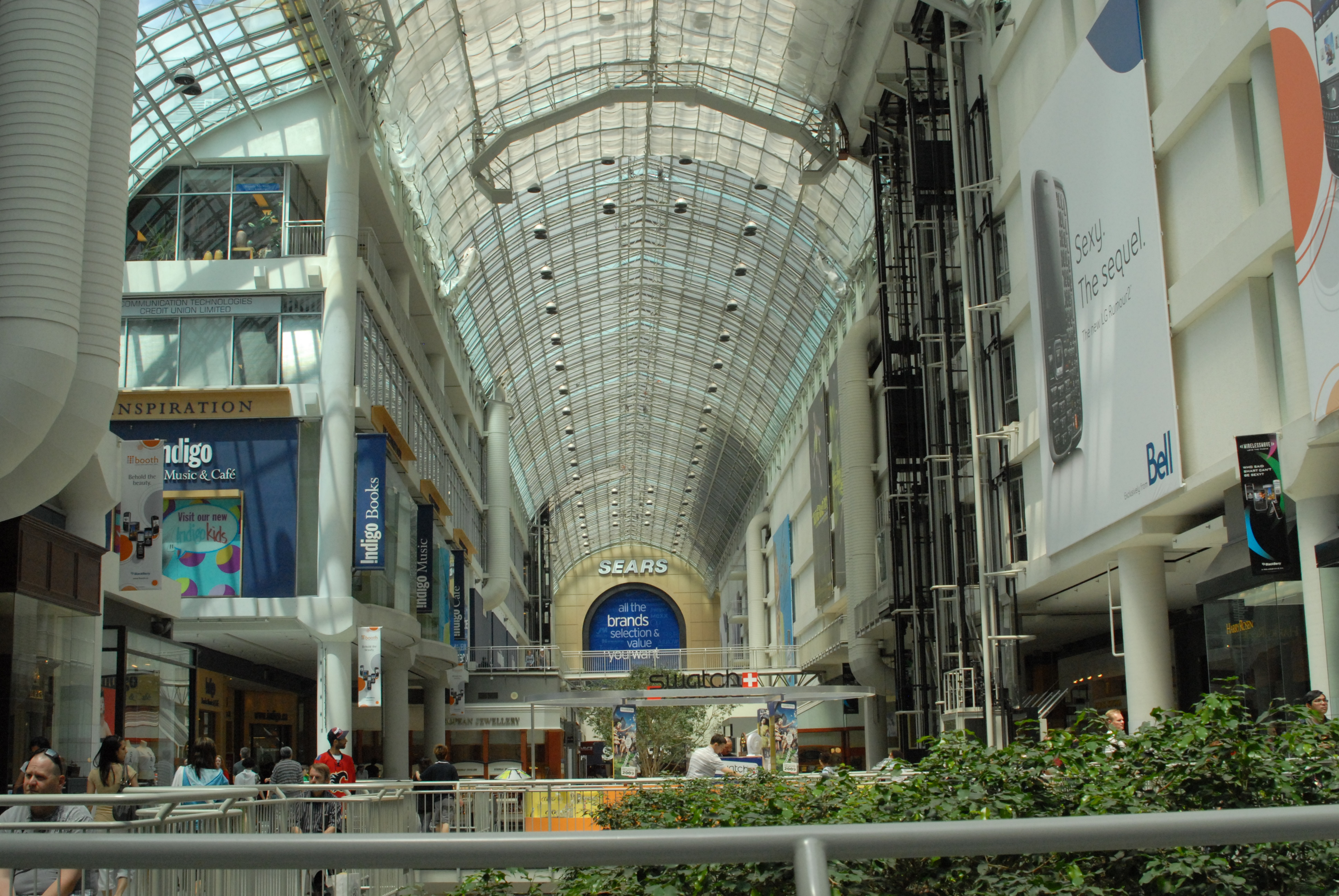
The interior of the Toronto Eaton Centre in Toronto, Ontario, Canada, a 201,320-square-meter (2,167,000 sq ft) super-regional shopping mall

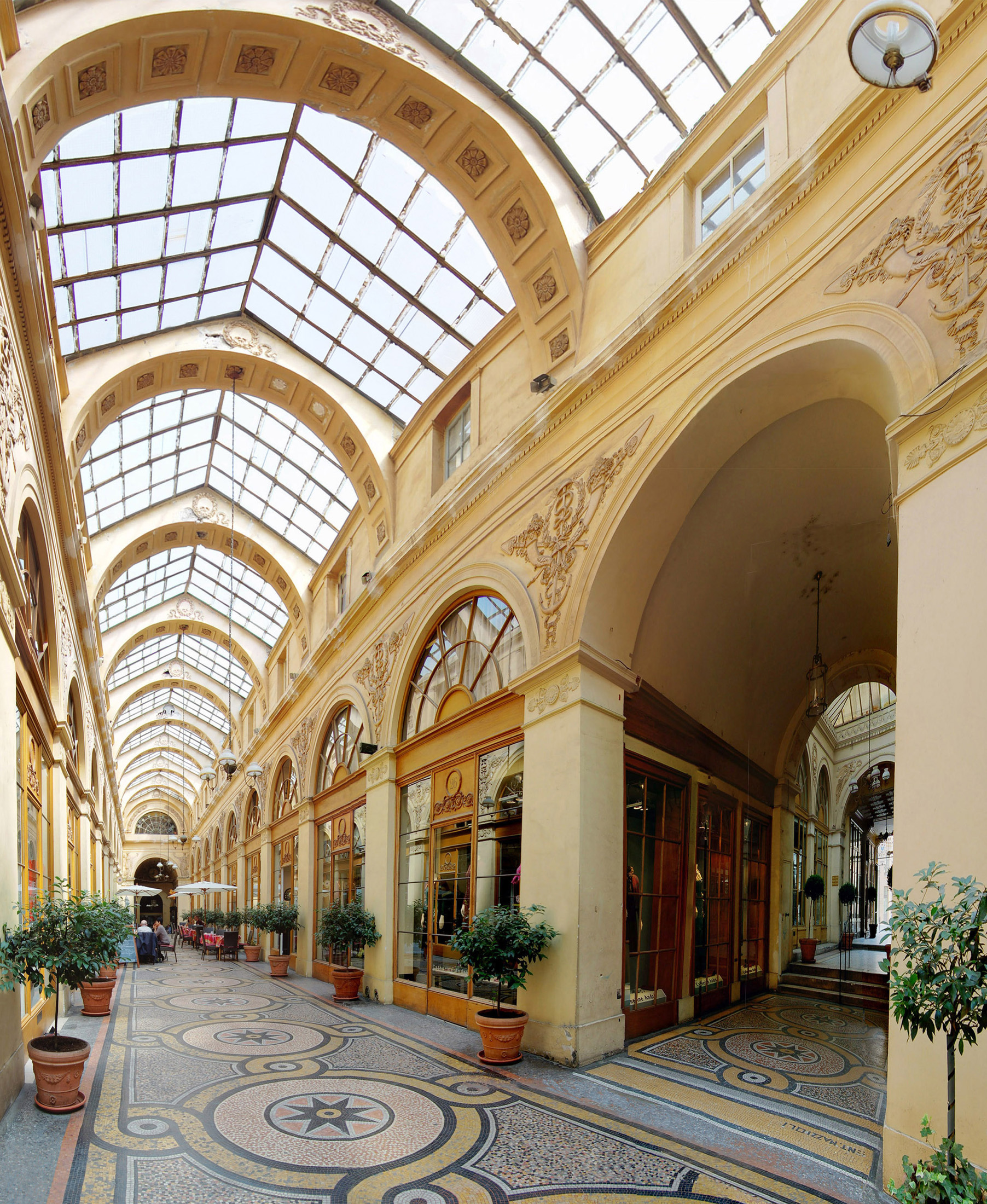
Interior of the Galerie Vivienne in Paris, by Francois Jean Delannoy, 1823-1826

A shopping center (shopping centre in Commonwealth English), shopping complex, shopping arcade, shopping plaza, or galleria is a group of shops built together, sometimes under one roof.

The first known collections of retailers under one roof are public markets, dating back to ancient times, and Middle Eastern covered markets, bazaars and souqs. In Paris, about 150 covered passages were built between the late 18th century and 1850, and a wealth of shopping arcades were built across Europe in the 19th century. In the United States, the widespread use of the automobile in the 1920s led to the first shopping centers consisting of a few dozen shops that included parking for cars. Starting in 1946, larger, open air centers anchored by department stores were built (sometimes as a collection of adjacent retail properties with different owners), and then enclosed shopping malls starting with Victor Gruen's Southdale Center near Minneapolis in 1956.

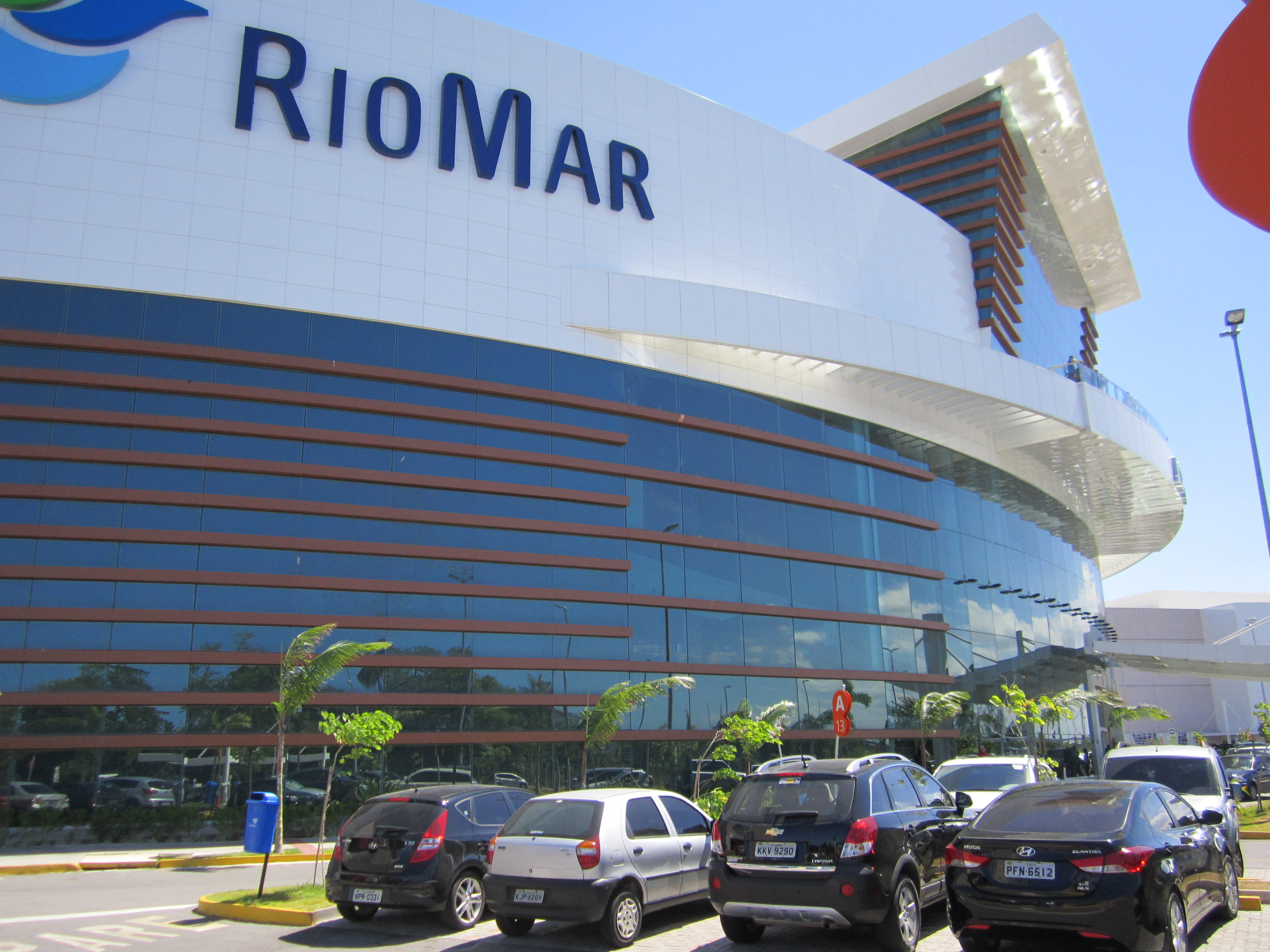
The exterior of RioMar Shopping in Recife, Pernambuco, Brazil

A shopping mall is a type of shopping center, a North American term originally meaning a pedestrian promenade with shops along it, but in the late 1960s began to be used as a generic term for large shopping centers anchored by department stores, especially enclosed centers. Many malls in the United States are currently in severe decline ("dead malls") or have closed. Successful exceptions have added entertainment and experiential features, added big-box stores as anchor tenants, or are specialized formats: power centers, lifestyle centers, factory outlet centers, and festival marketplaces. Smaller types of shopping centers in North America include neighborhood shopping centers, and even smaller, strip malls. Pedestrian malls (shopping streets) in the United States have been less common and less successful than in Europe. In Canada, underground passages in Montreal and Toronto link large adjacent downtown retail spaces.

In Europe shopping malls/centers continue to grow and thrive. In the region distinction is made between shopping centers (shops under one roof), shopping precincts (pedestrianized zones of a town or city where many retail stores are located), the High Street (street – pedestrianized or not – with a high concentration of retail shops), and retail parks (usually out of the city center, 5000 sq.m. or larger and anchored by big-box stores or supermarkets, rather than department stores).

== Types ==
Most English-speakers follow a mix of the United Kingdom's and United States's naming conventions.

In the UK, a "center for shopping" is commonly the center for a settlement. More recent shopping dedicated areas outside the main center are known as "shopping centers" (with understanding of the synonym shopping mall), "shopping villages", or "retail parks".

According to author Richard Longstreth, before the 1920s–1930s, the term "shopping center" in the U.S. was loosely applied to any group of adjacent retail businesses. A city's downtown might be called a "shopping center". By the 1940s, the term "shopping center" implied — if not always a single owner — at least, a place sharing comprehensive design planning, including layout, signs, exterior lighting, and parking; and shared business planning that covered the target market, types of stores and store mix.

The International Council of Shopping Centers classifies Asia-Pacific, European, U.S., and Canadian shopping centers into the following types:

Abbreviations: SC=shopping center/centre, GLA = Gross Leasable Area, NLA = Net Leasable Area, AP=Asia-Pacific, EU=Europe, Can=Canada, US=United States of America
^{*}does not apply to Europe

Type	(United States) US GLA ft^{2}	(United States) US GLA m^{2}	(European Union) EU GLA m^{2}	(European Union) EU GLA ft^{2}	(Canada) Can GLA ft^{2}	(Canada) Can GLA m^{2}	(ASEAN) AP NLA ft^{2}	(ASEAN) AP NLA m^{2}	# anchors^{*}	Typical anchors
Large general-purpose centers (US/AP) / traditional shopping centres (EU/Can)
Mega-mall (AP)	n/a						1,500,000+	140,000+	3+	Department stores, supermarkets, hypermarkets, multicinemas, major entertainment/leisure
Super-regional mall/center EU: Very large SC	800,000+	74,000+	80,000+	860,000+	800,000+	74,000+	800,000–1,499,999	74,000–139,999	3+	Regular/discount department stores, in Europe and Asia also supermarkets, hypermarkets, cinemas, major entertainment/leisure
Regional mall/center EU: Large SC	400,000–800,000	37,000–74,000	40,000–79,999	430,000–859,999	300,000–799,999	28,000–73,999	500,000–800,000	46,000–74,000	2+	Regular/discount department stores, in Europe and Asia also supermarkets, hypermarkets, cinemas, major entertainment/leisure
Small & medium general-purpose centers (US/AP) / traditional shopping centres (EU/Can)
Sub-regional SC (AP); Europe: Medium SC	n/a	n/a	20,000–39,999	220,000–429,999	n/a	n/a	200,000–500,000	19,000–46,000	0–3	Supermarket, hypermarket, small/discount department stores
Small comparison-based SC (EU)	n/a	n/a	5,000–19,999	54,000–219,999	n/a	n/a	n/a	n/a	n/a	Apparel, home furnishing, electronics, gifts, etc.
Small convenience-based SC (EU)	n/a	n/a	5,000–19,999	54,000–219,999	n/a	n/a	n/a	n/a	n/a	Supermarket, hypermarket, pharmacy, convenience store, household goods, etc.
Community shopping center	125,000–400,000	11,600–37,000	n/a		100,000–400,000	9,300–37,000	n/a	n/a	2+	Discount store, supermarket, drugstore, category killer. a.k.a. large neighborhood shopping center in US, Can
Neighborhood shopping center	30,000–125,000	2,800–11,600	n/a		40,000–99,000	3,700–9,200	20,000–200,000	1,900–19,000	1+ (US/Can); 0–2 (AP)	Supermarket, in Asia also hypermarket
Convenience center US/Can also "Strip mall"	<30,000	<2,800	n/a		10,000–39,000	930–3,600	n/a	n/a	0–1	Convenience store anchor or anchorless
Type	(United States) US GLA ft^{2}	(United States) US GLA m^{2}	(European Union) EU GLA m^{2}	(European Union) EU GLA ft^{2}	(Canada) Can GLA ft^{2}	(Canada) Can GLA m^{2}	(ASEAN) AP NLA ft^{2}	(ASEAN) AP NLA m^{2}	# anchors^{*}	Typical anchors
Specialized shopping centers
Power center EU: a.k.a. "Retail park"	250,000–600,000	23,000–56,000	S:5,000–9,999; M:10,000–19,999; L:20,000+	S:54,000–109,999; M:110,000–219,999; L:220,000+	100,000–1,000,000	9,300–93,000	>50,000	>4,600	3+ (US/Can) n/a (AP)	Category killers, warehouse clubs, large discount stores. In Asia 90% of NLA must be these.
Lifestyle center (US)	150,000–500,000	14,000–46,000	n/a	n/a	150,000–500,000	14,000–46,000	n/a	n/a	0–2	Large-format upscale specialty stores
Outlet mall/center	50,000–400,000	4,600–37,000	5,000+	54,000+	50,000–400,000	4,600–37,000	"no max. size"	"no max. size"	n/a	Manufacturers' and retail outlet stores
Theme/Festival (US) (Festival marketplace)	80,000–250,000	7,400–23,000	n/a	n/a	n/a	n/a	n/a	n/a	n/a	Restaurants, specialty stores catering to visitors, entertainment
Leisure/entertainment centre (AP); Leisure-based SC (EU)	n/a	n/a	5,000+	54,000+	n/a	n/a	<500,000	<46,000	N/A	Entertainment and/or F&B (food and beverage) (in Asia, 50%+ of tenants are these), plus specialty stores catering to visitors, fast fashion, electronics, sports. Europe: usually anchored by a multiplex cinema and also may include bowling, fitness. Excludes centers at transport hubs.
Specialty SC (AP)	n/a	n/a	n/a	n/a	n/a	n/a	<500,000	<46,000	0	Specialty shops with general product mix (apparel, F&B, electronics, etc.)
Single category SC (AP); Non-leisure-based themed SC (EU)	n/a	n/a	5,000+	54,000+	n/a	n/a	n/a	n/a	n/a	Dedicated to single product type other than F&B, groceries or fashion, e.g. information technology, homewares/furniture. In Asia, 80% of NLA should be dedicated to the theme.
Major transportation hub SC (AP)	n/a	n/a	n/a	n/a	n/a	n/a	>50,000	>4,600	n/a	Retail at public transportation hubs including airside airport retail
Limited-purpose property
Airport retail	75,000–300,000	7,000–28,000	n/a	n/a	n/a	n/a	n/a	n/a	0	Speciality retail and restaurants
Shopping centre hybrids (Canada only)
Hybrid SC (Can)	n/a	n/a	n/a	n/a	250,000+	23,000+	n/a	n/a	varies	Has characteristics of two or more shopping center types e.g. convenience + regional

=== General-purpose ===
==== Multiregional ====
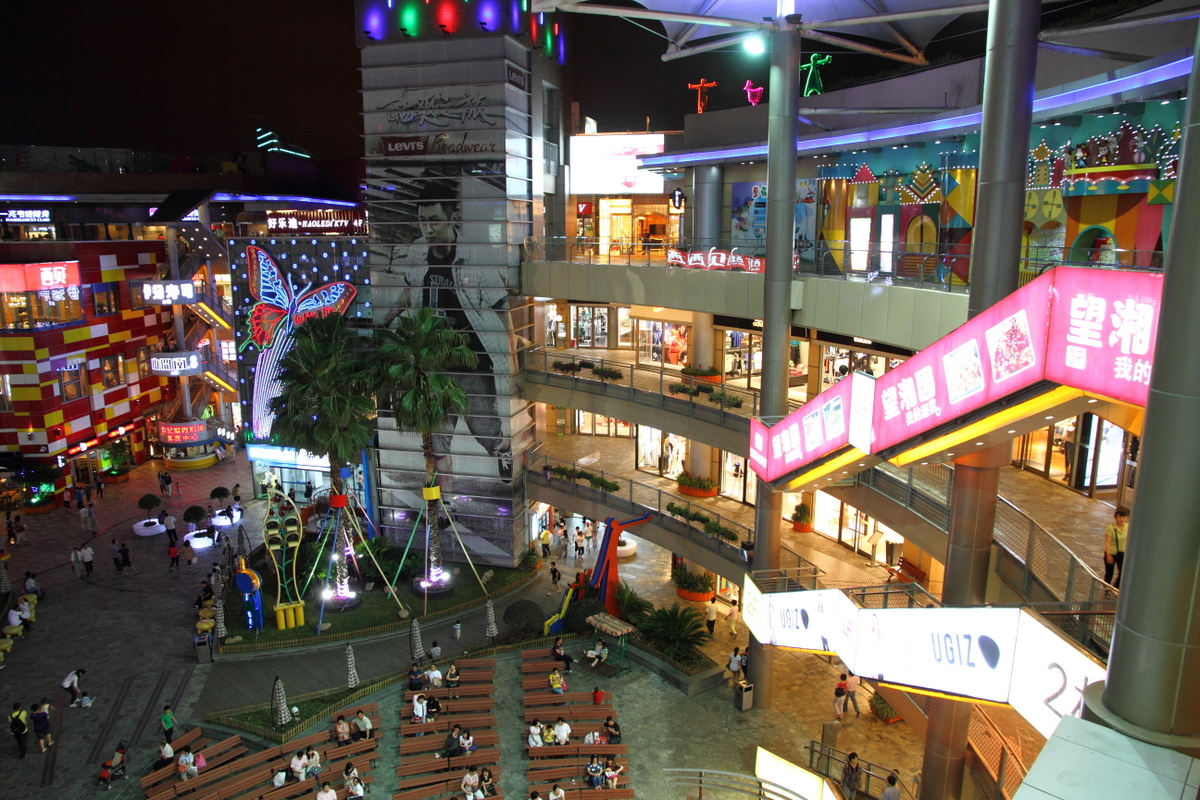
Bailian Xijiao Shopping Mall in Shanghai, at 109,000 square metres (1,170,000 sq ft) a super-regional shopping mall

A superregional-scale center is commonly called a city centre. According to the International Council of Shopping Centers it is over 800,000 sq ft (74,000 m^{2}) of gross leasable area. These have three or more anchors, mass and varied merchant trade and serves as the dominant venue for the region (25 miles or 40 km) in which it is located.

Note that ICSC defines indoor centers above 800,000 square feet (74,000 m^{2}) net leasable area in Asia-Pacific as mega-malls.

==== Regional ====
A regional-scale shopping centre (commonly known as a town centre) is typically larger with 400,000 sq ft (37,000 m^{2}) to 800,000 sq ft (74,000 m^{2}) gross leasable area with at least two anchor stores and offers a wider selection of stores. Given their wider service area, these tend to have higher-end stores (department stores) that need a larger area in order for their services to be profitable. Regional centres have tourist attractions, education and hospitality areas.

Indoor centres are commonly called Shopping Malls in the U.S. or Shopping Centres in Commonwealth English.

==== Community ====
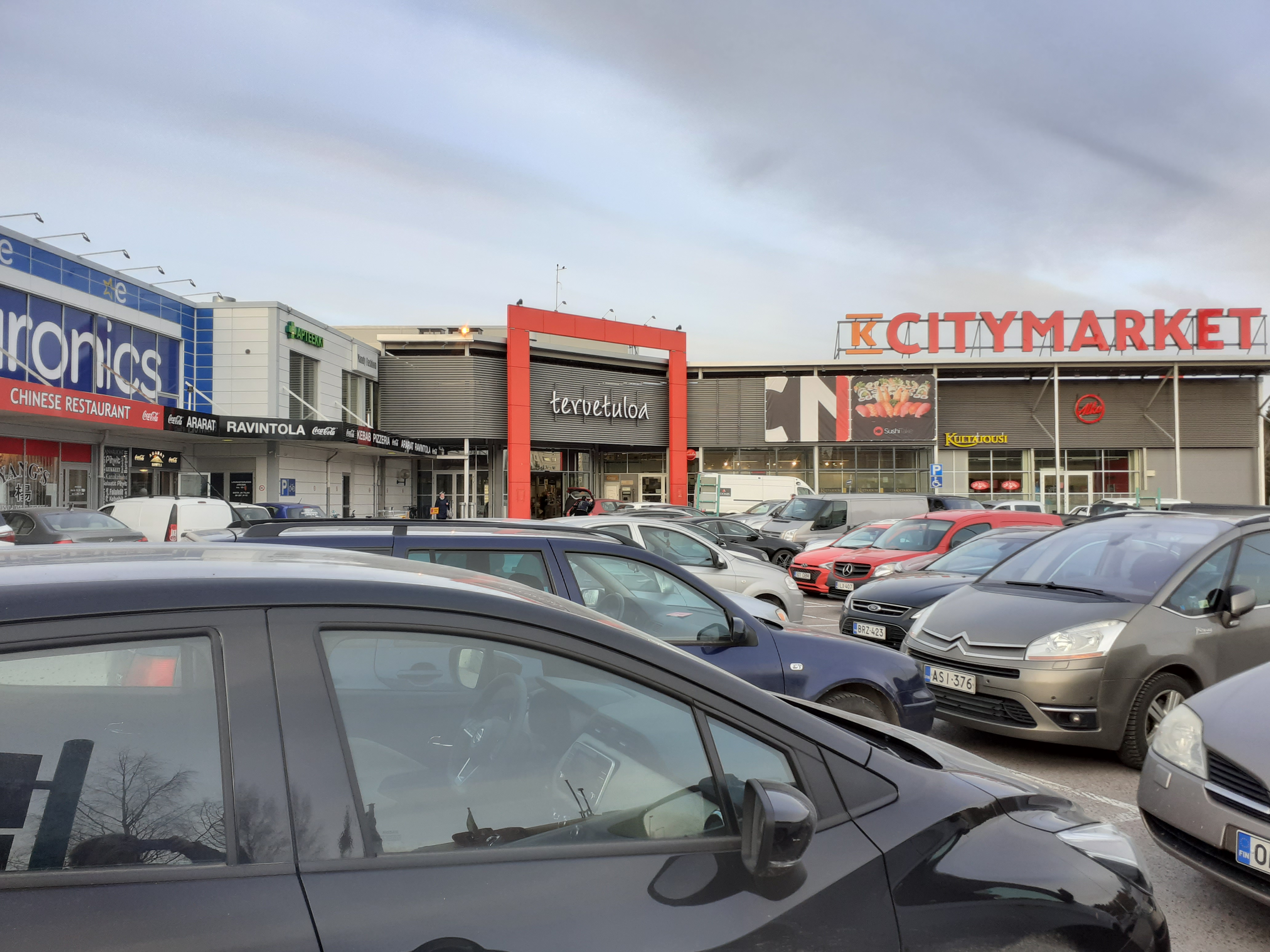
A community shopping centre in Klaukkala, Uusimaa, Finland

Community-scale shopping centres are commonly called Main Streets, High Streets or town squares in wider centres or in English-speaking Europe as retail parks for certain centres. These offer a wider range of goods and has two anchor supermarkets or discount department stores. They may also follow a parallel configuration, or may be L- or U-shaped. Community centers usually feature a retail area of 100,000 to 350,000 square feet (9,300 to 32,500 m^{2}) and serve a primary area of 3 to 6 miles (5 to 10 km).

==== Local ====
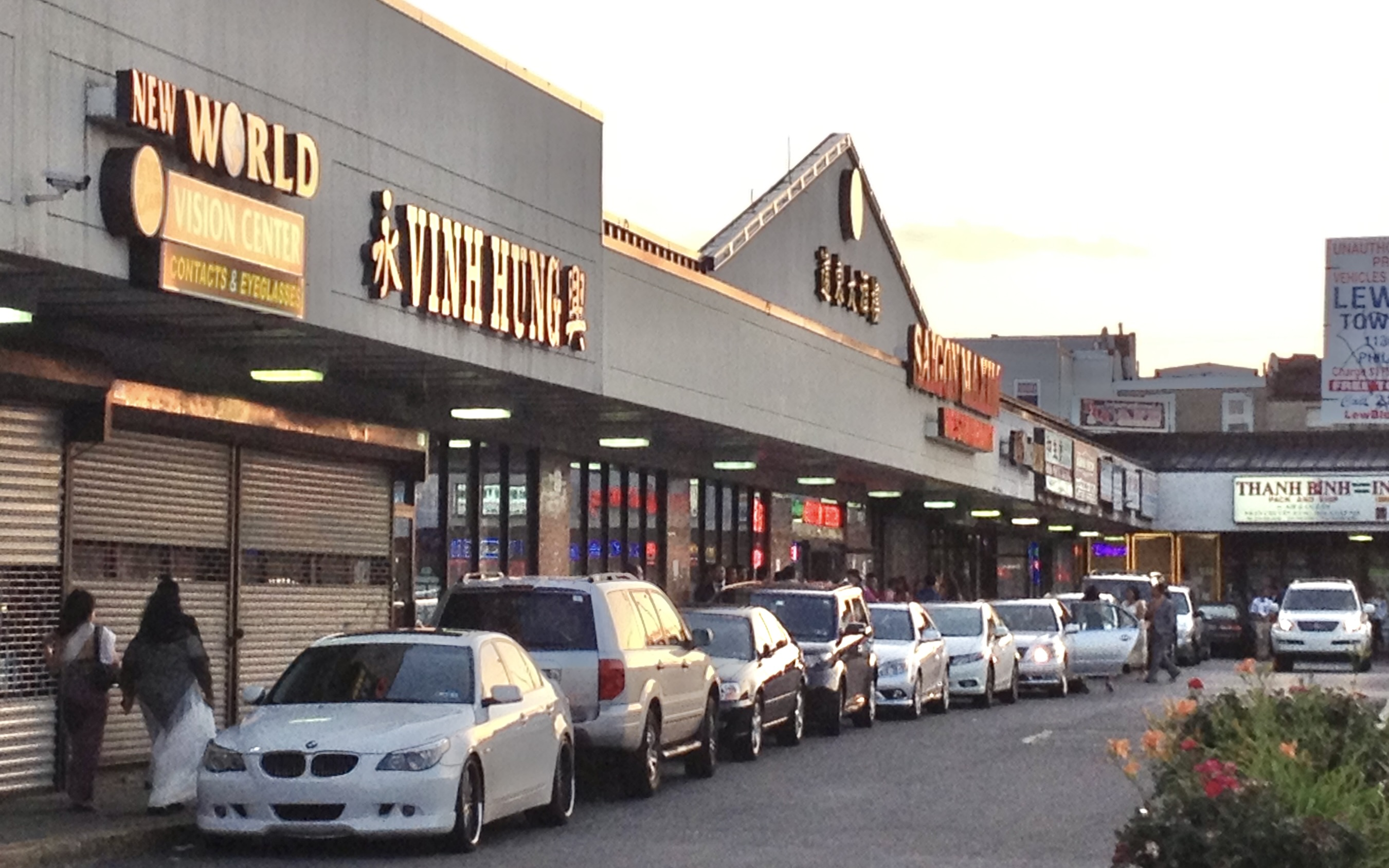
A neighborhood shopping center catering to Vietnamese Americans in Little Saigon, Philadelphia

Local-scale shopping centres usually have a retail area of 30,000 to 150,000 square feet (2,800 to 13,900 m^{2}), and serve a primary area in a 3-mile (5 km) radius. They typically have a supermarket as an anchor or a large convenience shop and commonly serve large villages or as secondary centres to towns.

Car-dependent centres in the U.K. and Europe, if larger than 5,000 square metres (54,000 sq ft) can be termed a small retail park, while in the U.S. and some other countries it is known as a neighborhood shopping center.

==== Convenience ====
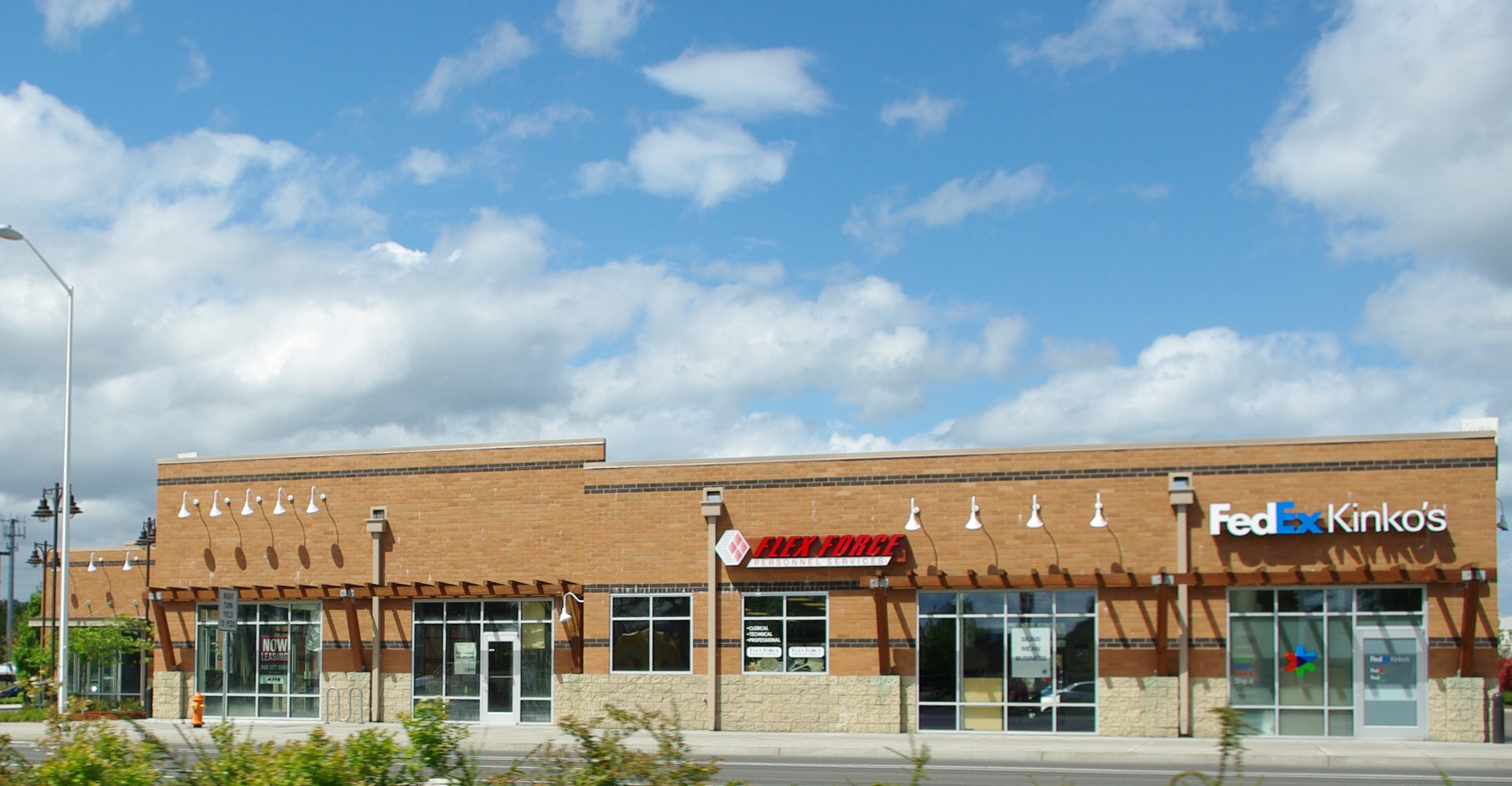
A strip mall in Cornelius, Oregon

Convenience-scale centers, independent of other centers are known as strip malls or as shopping parades. These centers are less than 30,000 square feet (2,800 m^{2}) of gross leasable space and commonly serve villages or as parts of larger centers commonly called small squares, plazas or indoor markets. They are also called strip centers or convenience centers. Strip Malls, despite the name, are not considered "malls" in North America.

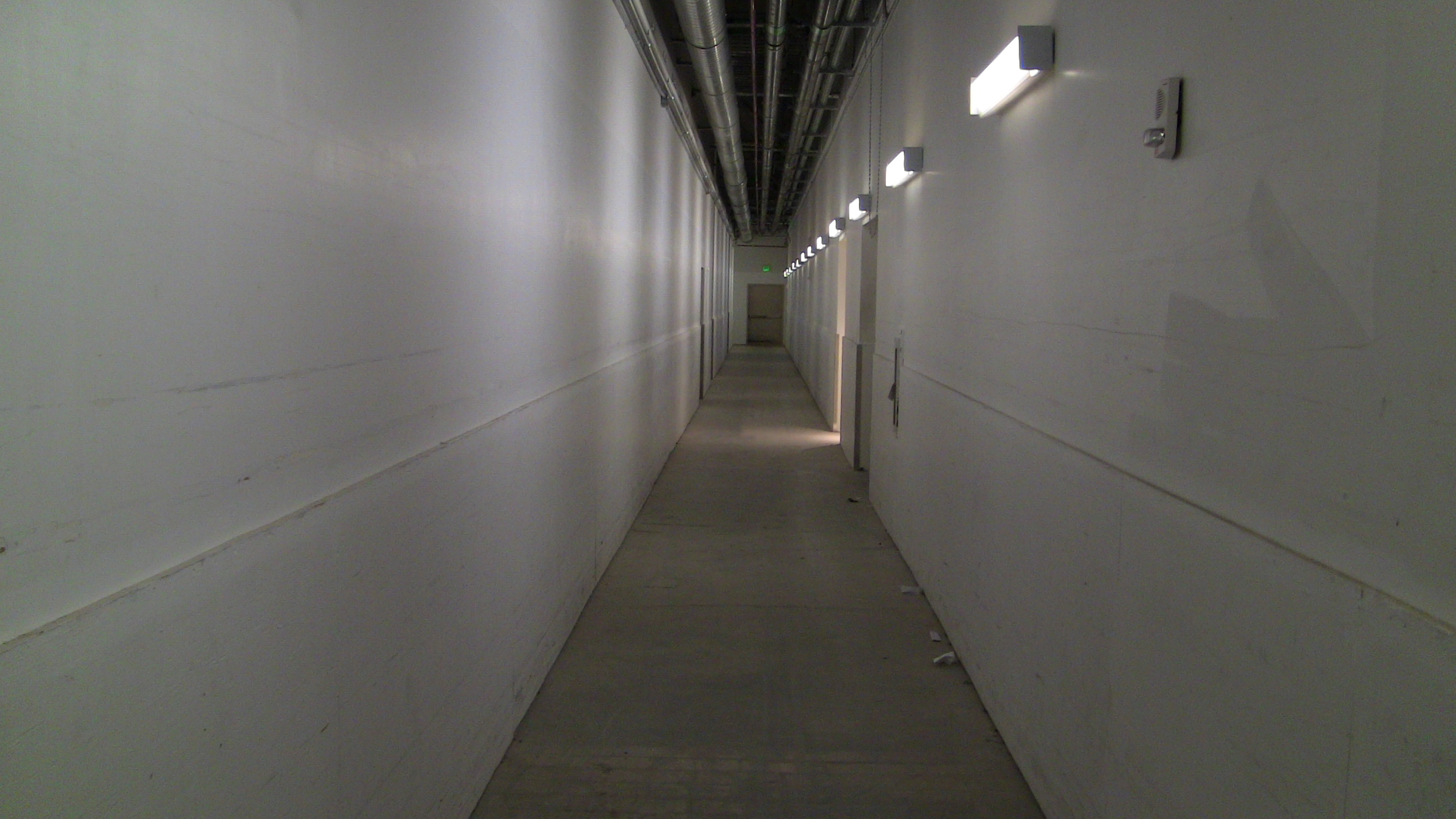
Shopping centers use hallways like this one to keep employees and freight out of the public's view.

=== Sector-focused ===
==== Power centers and retail parks ====
Power centers, in North America, are open-air single-level shopping centers that almost exclusively feature several big-box retailers as their anchors (although newer urban power centers have adopted enclosed and/or vertical formats while retaining the strong big-box emphasis). They usually have a retail area of 250,000 to 600,000 square feet (23,000 to 56,000 m^{2}) and a primary trade area of 5 to 10 miles (8 to 16 km).

A retail park, in the United Kingdom and Europe, is a type of shopping centre found on the fringes of most large towns and cities in the United Kingdom, and some (but not all) other European countries. In Europe, any shopping center with mostly "retail warehouse units" (UK terminology; in the US the term is "big-box stores"/superstores), 5,000 square metres (54,000 sq ft) or larger is a retail park, according to the leading real estate company Cushman & Wakefield. This would be considered in North America either a power center or a neighborhood shopping center, depending on the size.

==== Lifestyle center ====
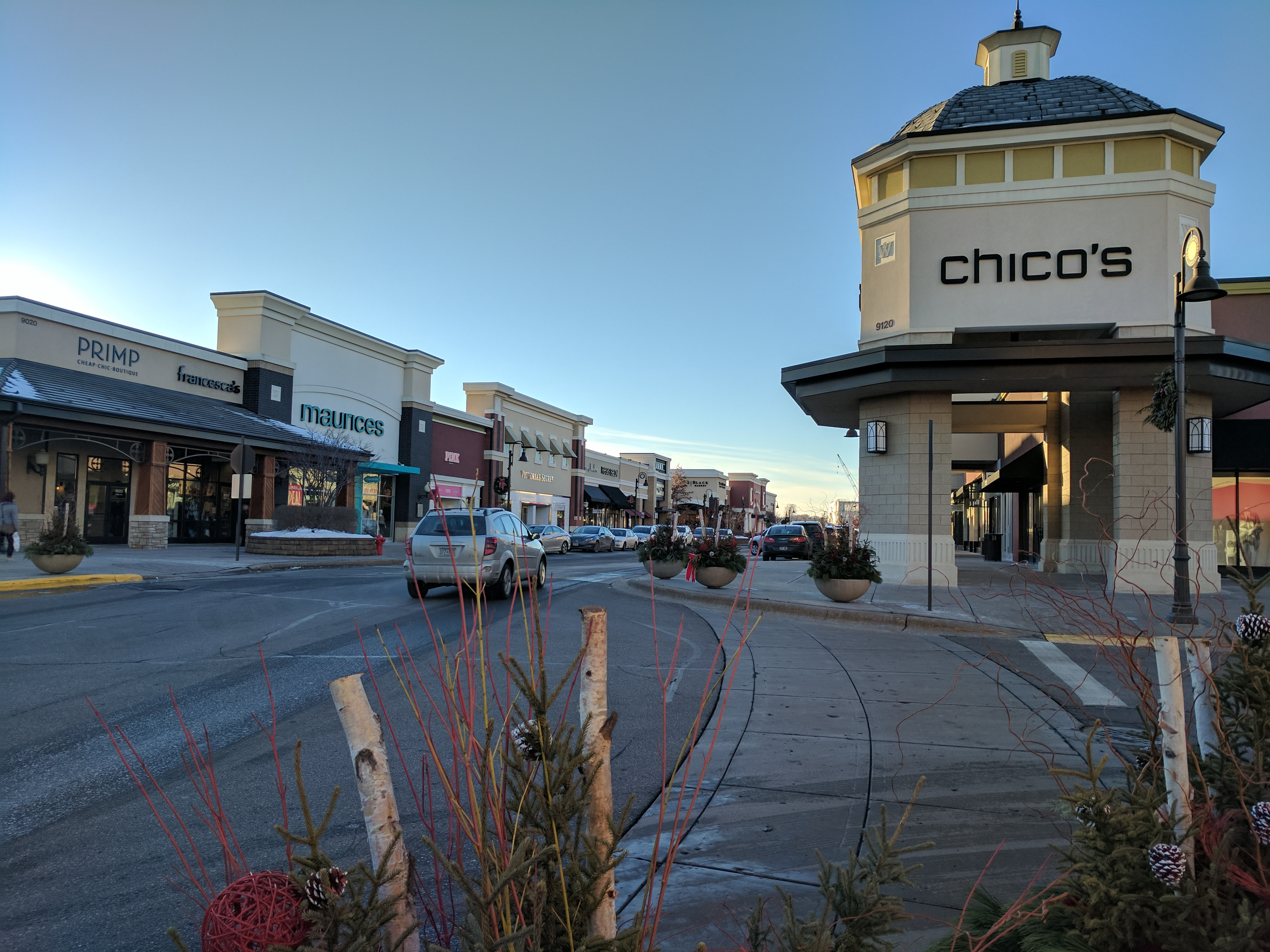
Lifestyle center located in Woodbury, Minnesota

A lifestyle center (American English), or lifestyle centre (Commonwealth English), is a shopping center or mixed-used commercial development that combines the traditional retail functions of a shopping mall with leisure amenities oriented towards upscale consumers.

==== Theme/festival center ====
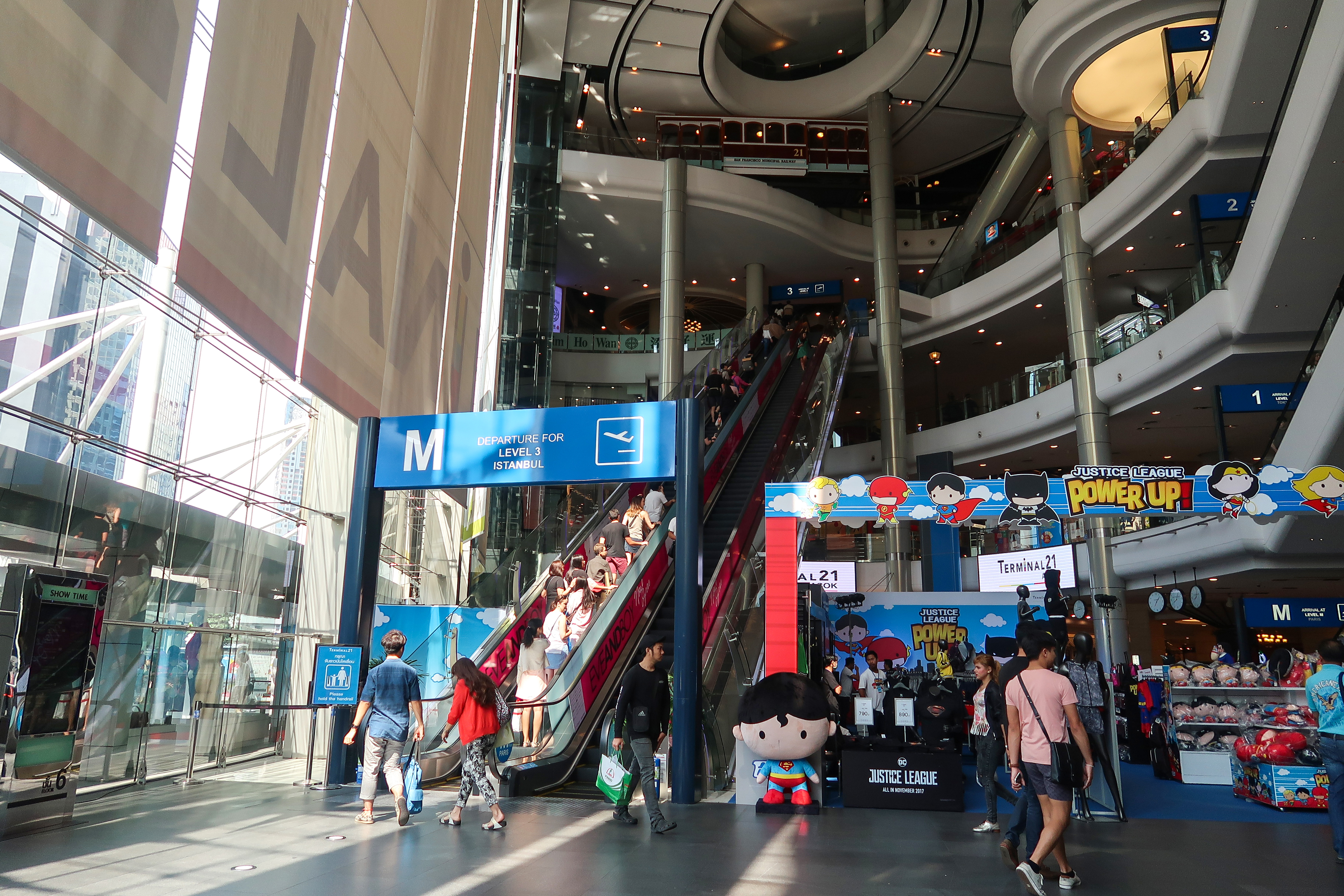
Terminal 21, a 40,000-square-metre (430,000 sq ft) shopping centre in Bangkok. Each floor has a theme of a different major world city.

Theme or festival centers have distinct unifying themes that are followed by their individual shops as well as their architecture. They are usually located in urban areas and cater to tourists. They typically feature a retail area of 80,000 to 250,000 square feet (7,400 to 23,200 m^{2}).

==== Outlet centre ====
An outlet centre (or outlet mall in North America) is a type of shopping centre in which manufacturers sell their products directly to the public through their own stores. Other stores in outlet centres are operated by retailers selling returned goods and discontinued products, often at heavily reduced prices. Outlet stores were found as early as 1936, but the first multi-store outlet centre, Vanity Fair, located in Reading, Pennsylvania, did not open until 1974. Belz Enterprises opened the first enclosed factory outlet center in 1979, in Lakeland, Tennessee, a suburb of Memphis.

==== Shopping precinct / Pedestrian mall ====
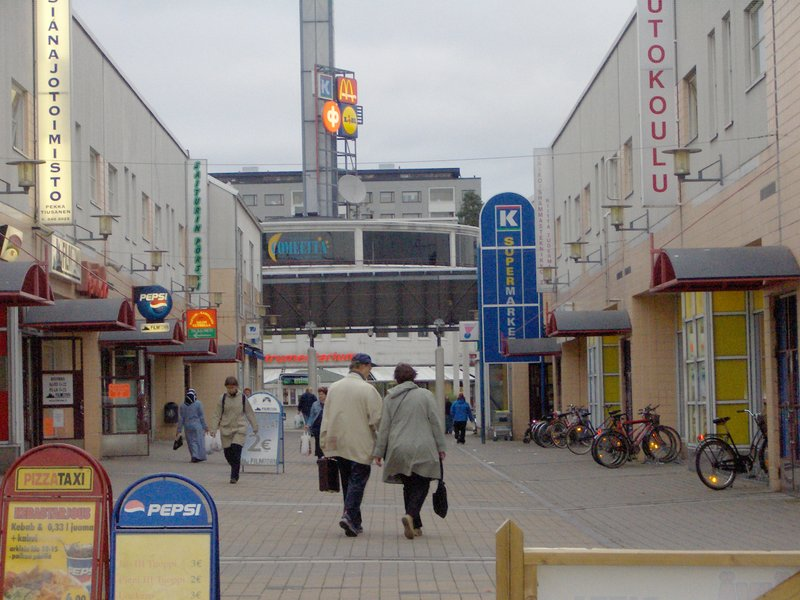
A pedestrian area in Kontula, Helsinki, Finland

A shopping precinct (U.K. term) or pedestrian mall (U.S. term) is an area of city centre streets which have been pedestrianized, where there is a concentration of "high street shops" such as department stores, clothing and home furnishings stores, and so forth. They may be part of a larger city-centre pedestrian zone, as is Strøget in Copenhagen, Denmark. In the U.S. chiefly in the 1960s, some cities converted a main shopping street (usually several blocks of one street only) to pedestrian zones known at the time as shopping malls (i.e. the original meaning of "mall": a "promenade"), but now referred to as pedestrian malls.

==== Shopping arcade ====
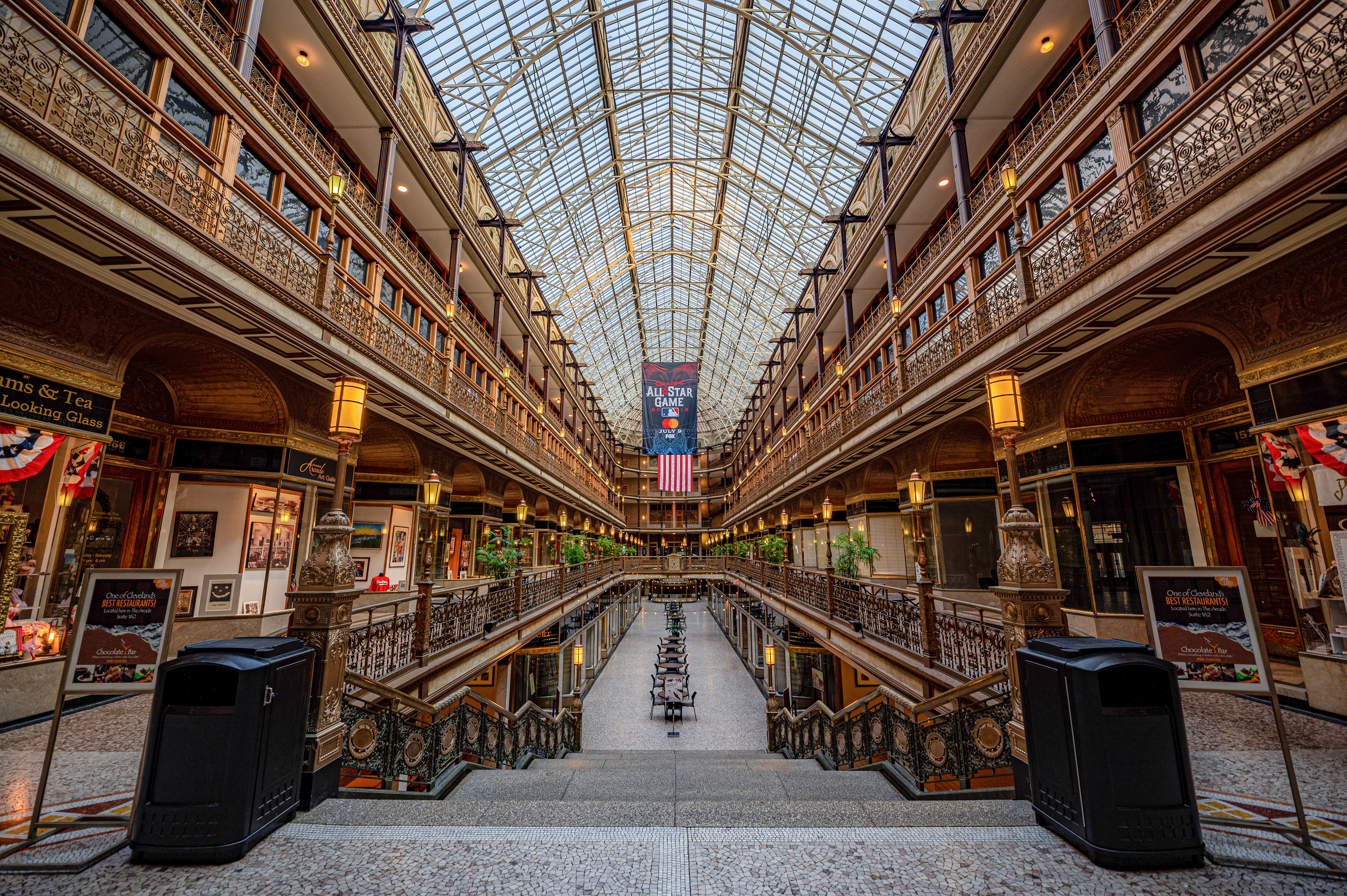
Cleveland Arcade in Cleveland, Ohio

A shopping arcade is a type of shopping precinct that developed earlier and in which the connecting walkways are not owned by a single proprietor and may be in the open air or covered by a ground-floor loggia. Many early shopping arcades such as the Burlington Arcade in London, the Galleria Vittorio Emanuele II in Milan, and numerous arcades in Paris are famous and still functioning as shopping centres, while many others have been demolished.

In Russia, centuries-old shopping centres the size of regional malls still operate, consisting of multiple arcades. They developed from previous so-called "trading rows", which were essentially markets where traders could obtain space to sell their goods. Great Gostiny Dvor in Saint Petersburg in its present buildings dates back to the 1760s. With a total area of 800,000 square feet (74,000 m^{2}), GUM in Moscow, opened in its present buildings in the 1890s.

==== In historical buildings ====
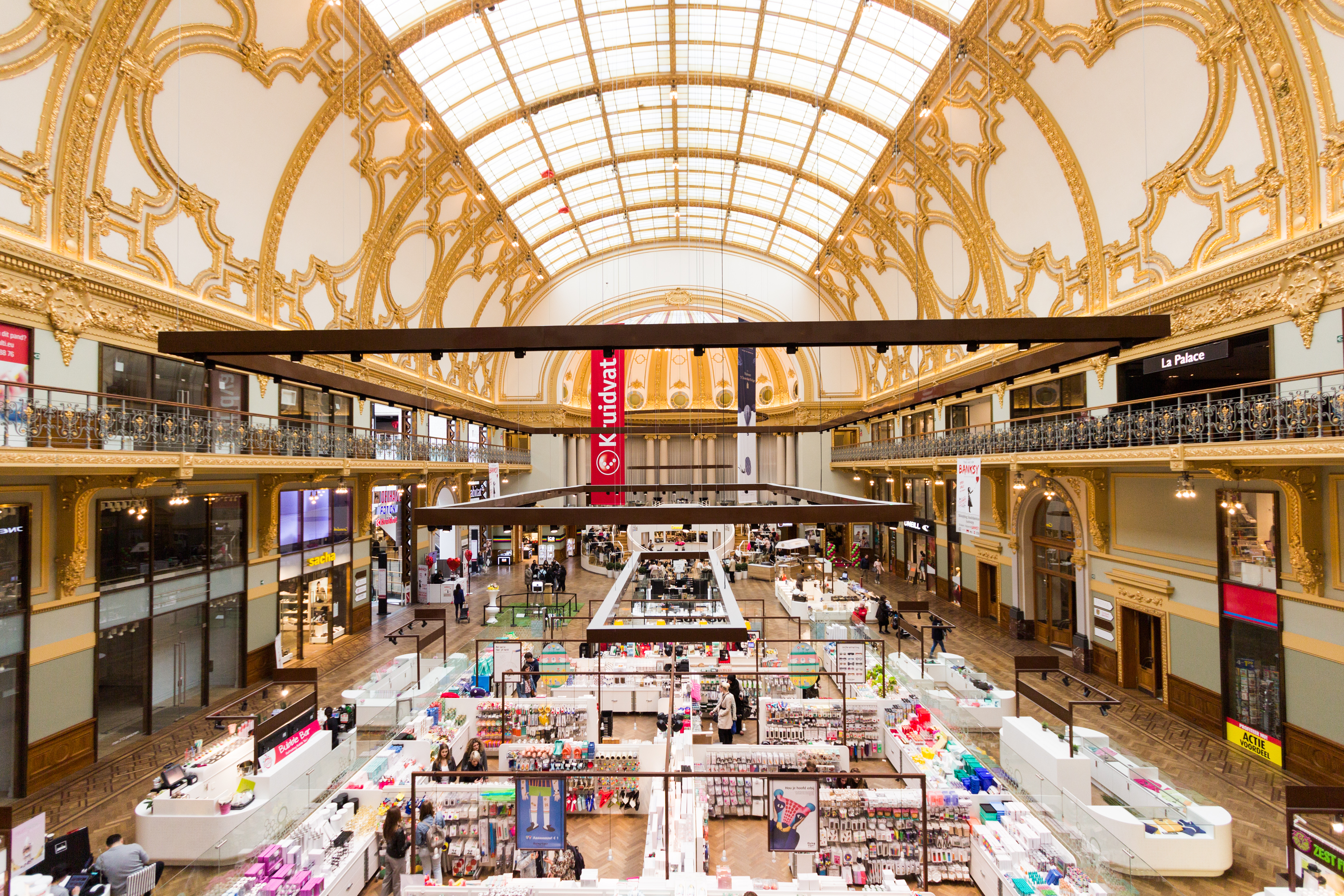
The Stadsfeestzaal^{(nl)}, an exhibition palace-turned-shopping centre in Antwerp, Belgium

Historic and/or monumental buildings are sometimes converted into shopping centers, often forming part of a larger city center shopping district that otherwise consists mostly of on-street stores. Examples are the former main post office of Amsterdam, now Magna Plaza; the Stadsfeestzaal in Antwerp, Belgium, a former exhibition "palace"; the former Sears warehouse, now Ponce City Market in Atlanta; the former Emporium-Capwell department store in San Francisco, now San Francisco Centre; Georgetown Park in Washington, D.C., and the Abasto de Buenos Aires, formerly the city's wholesale produce market.

== History ==
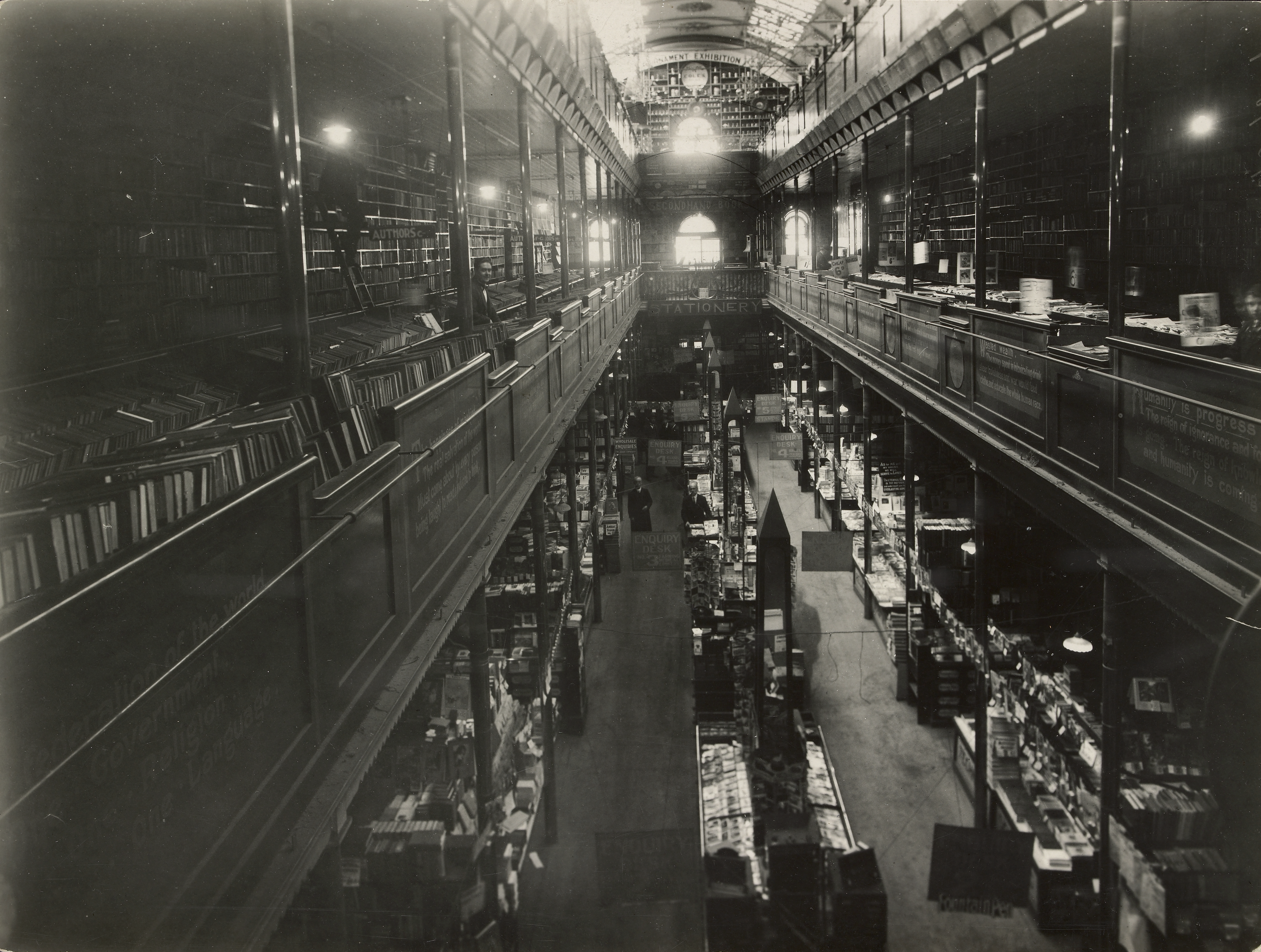
The Cole's Book Arcade, an early Victorian arcade ca.1883 - ca. 1903 in Melbourne

Shopping centers are not a recent innovation. One of the earliest examples of public shopping areas comes from ancient Rome, in forums where shopping markets were located. One of the earliest public shopping centers is Trajan's Market in Rome located in Trajan's Forum. Trajan's Market was probably built around 100–110 AD by Apollodorus of Damascus, and it is thought to be the world's oldest shopping center. The Grand Bazaar of Istanbul was built in the 15th century and is still one of the largest covered shopping centers in the world, with more than 58 streets and 4,000 shops. Numerous other covered shopping arcades, such as the 19th-century Al-Hamidiyah Souq in Damascus, Syria, might also be considered as precursors to the present-day large shopping centers. Isfahan's Grand Bazaar, which is largely covered, dates from the 10th century. The 10-kilometer-long, covered Tehran's Grand Bazaar also has a lengthy history. The oldest continuously occupied shopping mall in the world is likely to be the Chester Rows. Dating back at least to the 13th century, these covered walkways housed shops, with storage and accommodation for traders on various levels. Different rows specialized in different goods, such as 'Bakers Row' or 'Fleshmongers Row'.

Gostiny Dvor in St. Petersburg, which opened in 1785, may be regarded as one of the first purposely-built mall-type shopping complexes, as it consisted of more than 100 shops covering an area of over 53,000 m^{2} (570,000 sq ft).

The Marché des Enfants Rouges in Paris opened in 1628 and still runs today. The Oxford Covered Market in Oxford, England opened in 1774 and still runs today.

The Passage du Caire was opened in Paris in 1798. The Burlington Arcade in London was opened in 1819. The Arcade in Providence, Rhode Island introduced the retail arcade concept to the United States in 1828 and is arguably the oldest "shopping center" in the country. The Galleria Vittorio Emanuele II in Milan, Italy followed in the 1870s and is closer to large modern malls in spaciousness. Other large cities created arcades and shopping centers in the late 19th century and early 20th century, including the Cleveland Arcade, and Moscow's GUM, which opened in 1890. When the Cleveland Arcade opened in 1890, it was among the first indoor shopping arcades in the US, and like its European counterparts, was an architectural triumph. Two sides of the arcade had 1,600 panes of glass set in iron framing and is a prime example of Victorian architecture. Sydney's Queen Victoria Markets Building, opened in 1898, was also an ambitious architectural project.

Shopping Centers built before the 20th century;

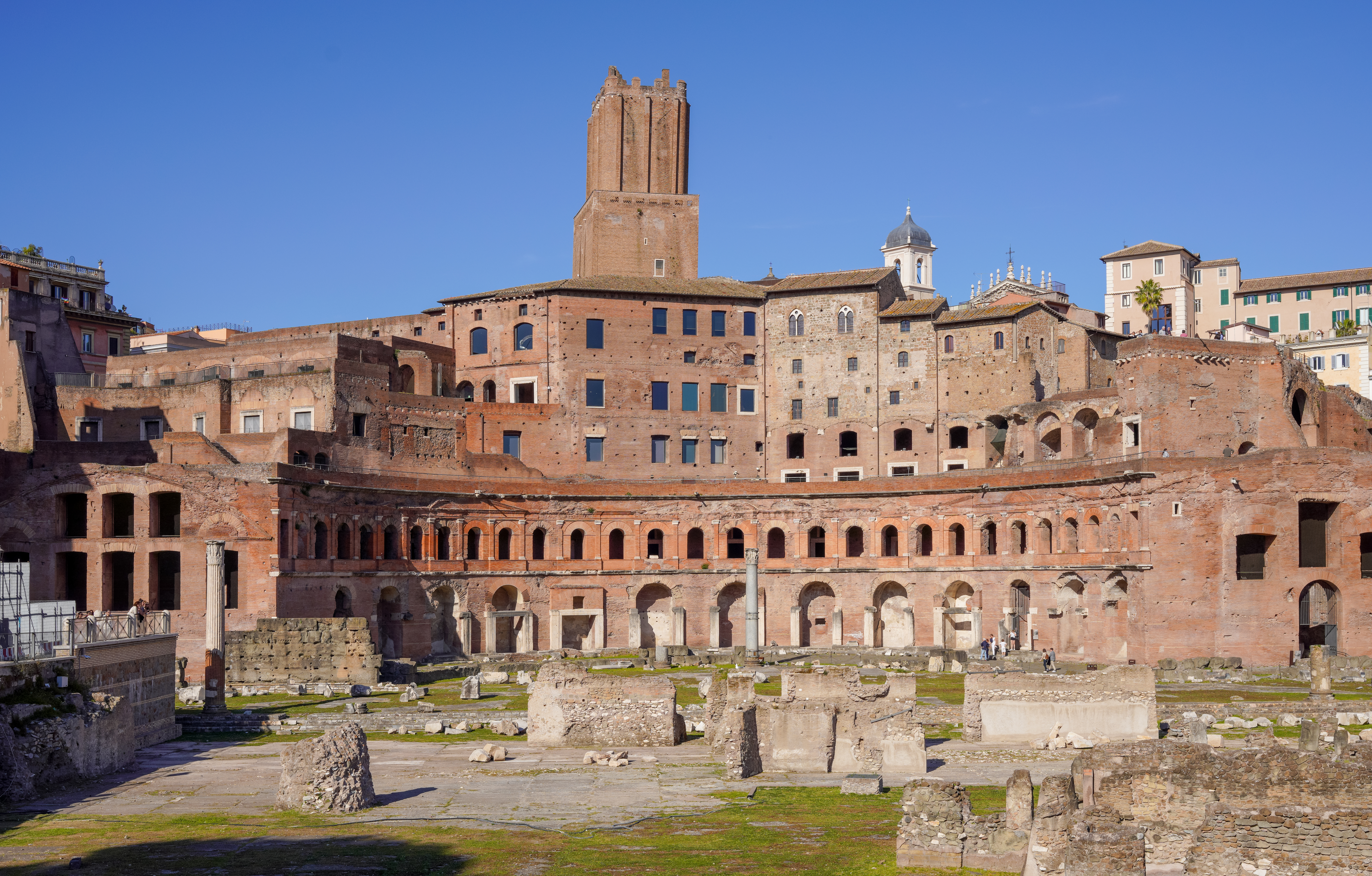
Trajan's Market ruins, located in Rome, Italy. Thought to be the world's oldest shopping centre.

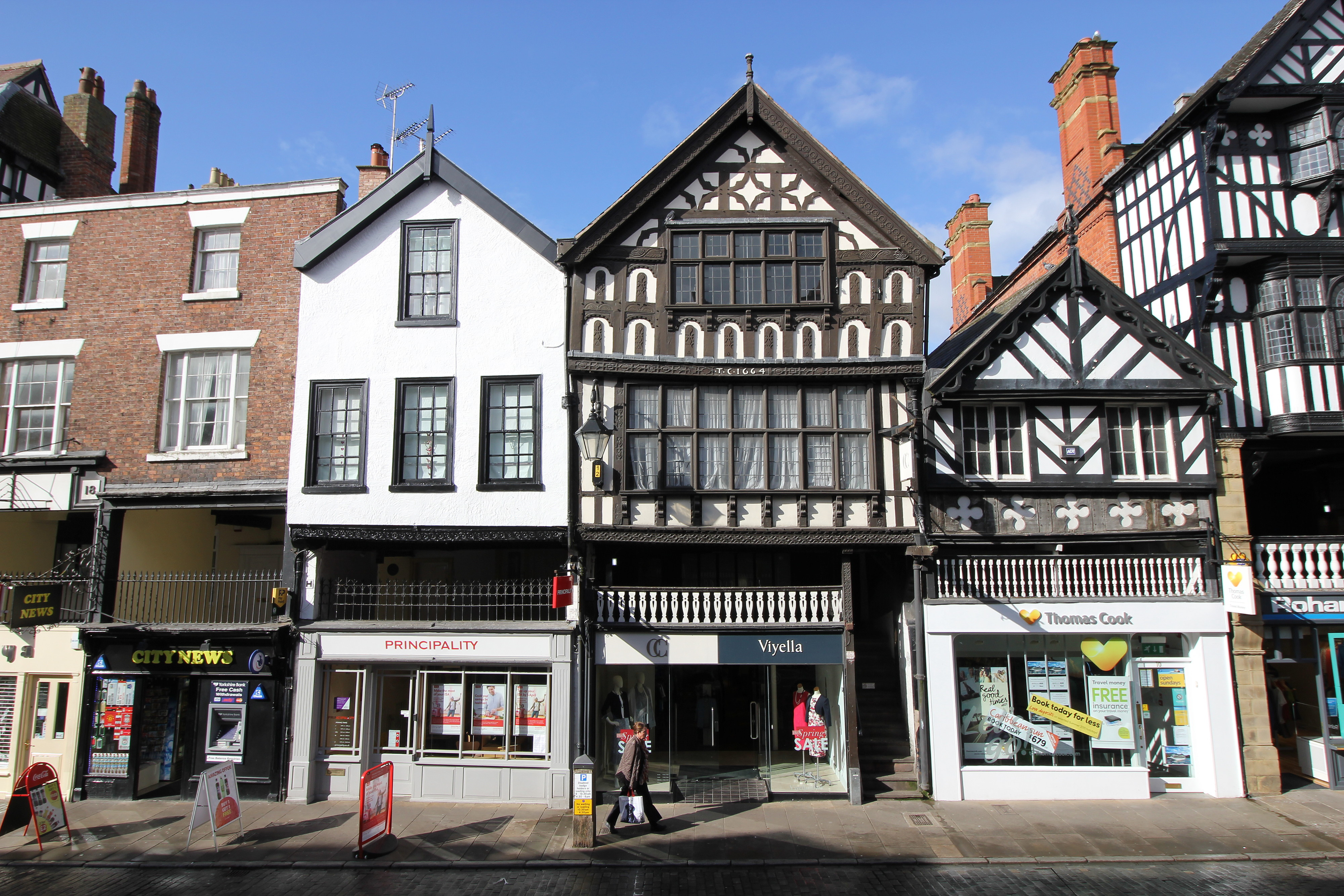
Chester Rows, United Kingdom. Opened circa 1350.

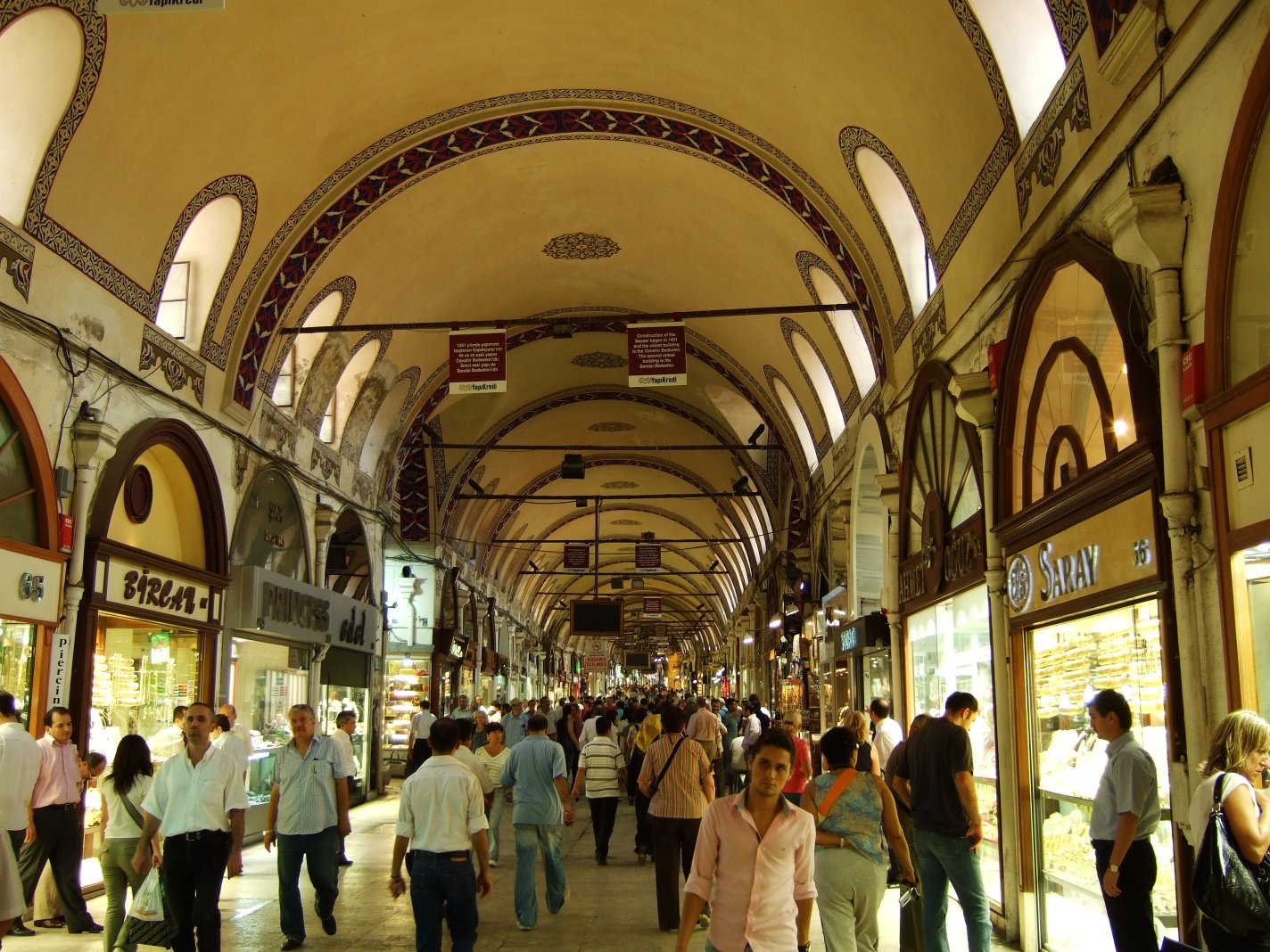
Grand Bazaar of Istanbul, Turkey. Opened in 1455.

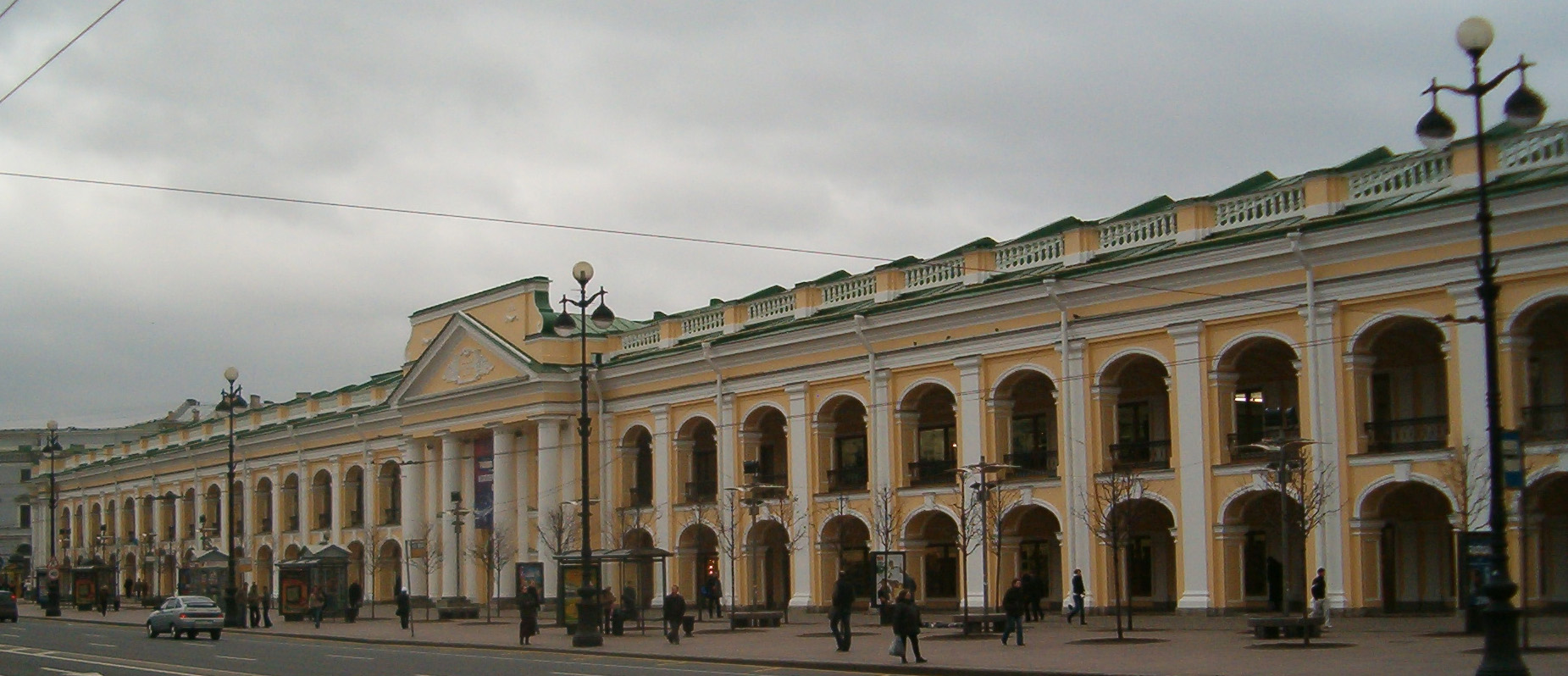
Great Gostiny Dvor, located in St.Petersburg, Russia. Opened in 1785.

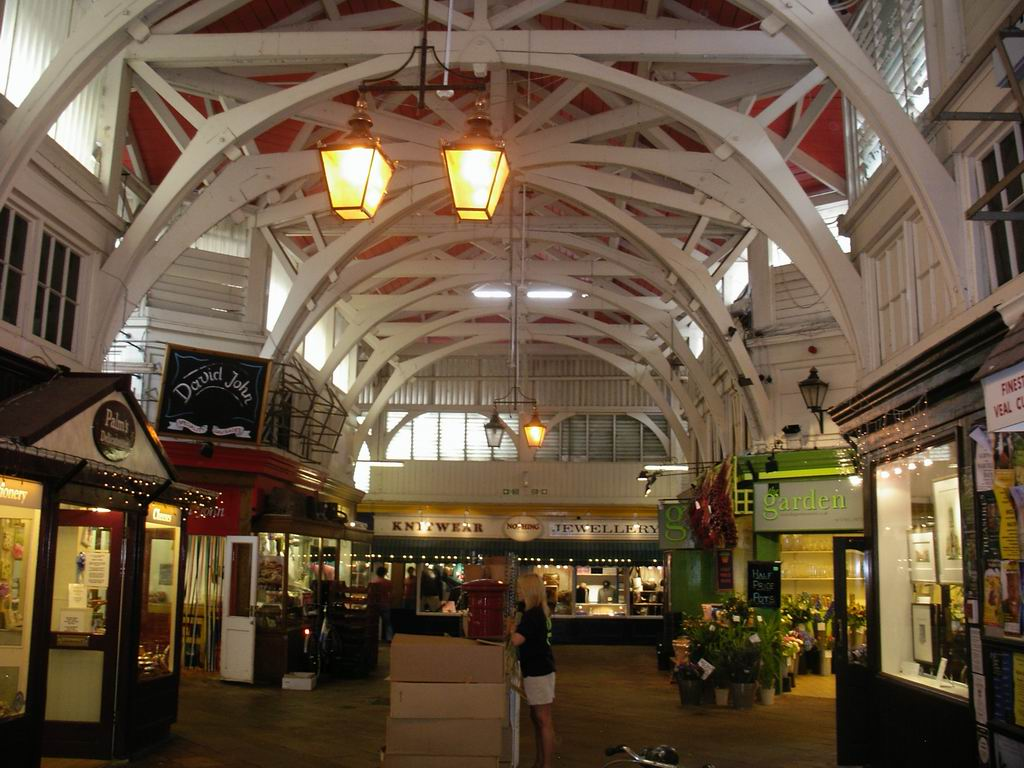
Oxford Covered Market, located in Oxford, England, United Kingdom. Opened in 1774.

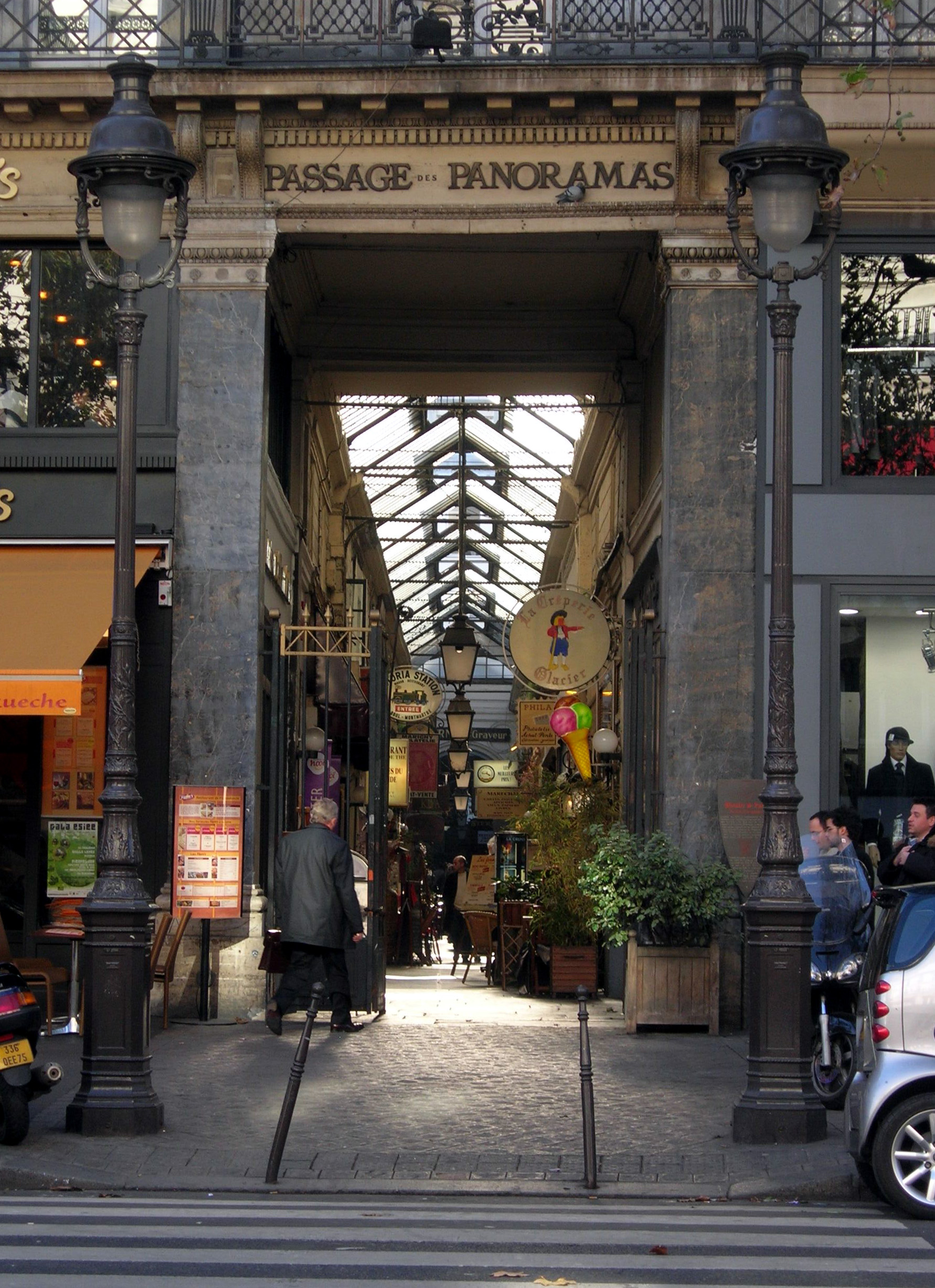
Passage des Panoramas, located in Paris, France. Opened in 1800.

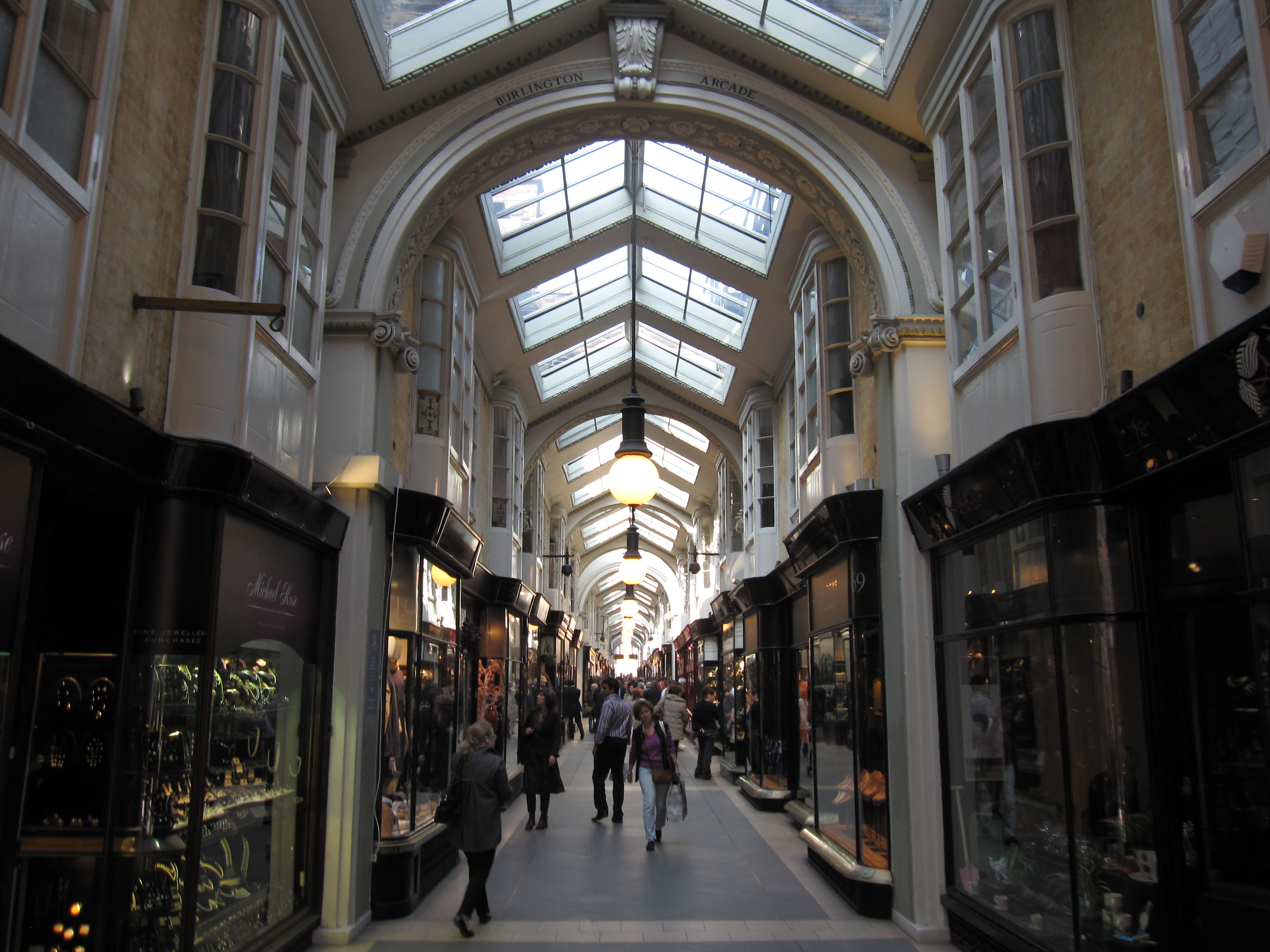
Burlington Arcade, located in London, England, United Kingdom. Opened in 1819.

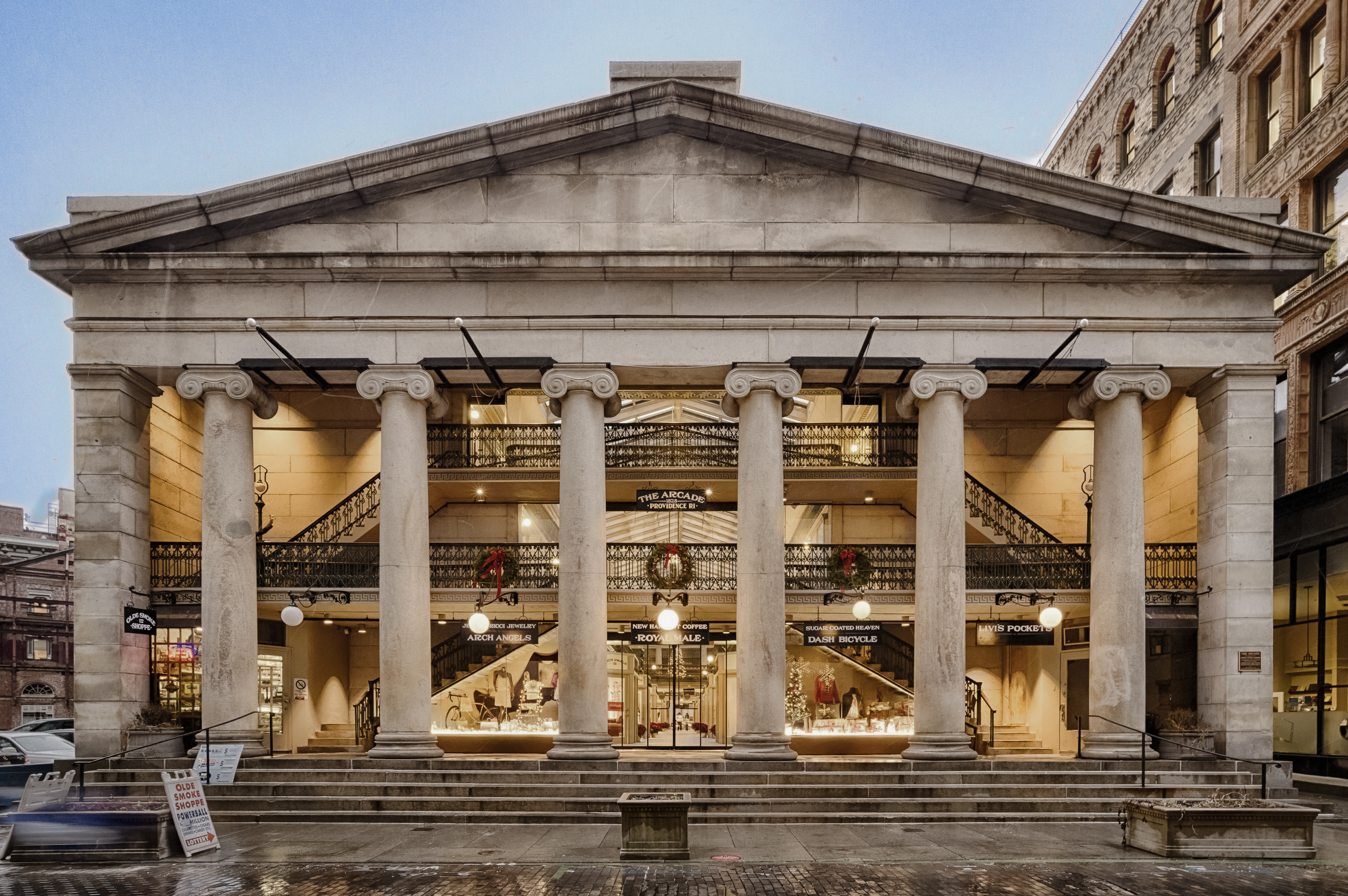
Westminster Arcade located in Providence, Rhode Island, United States. Opened in 1828.

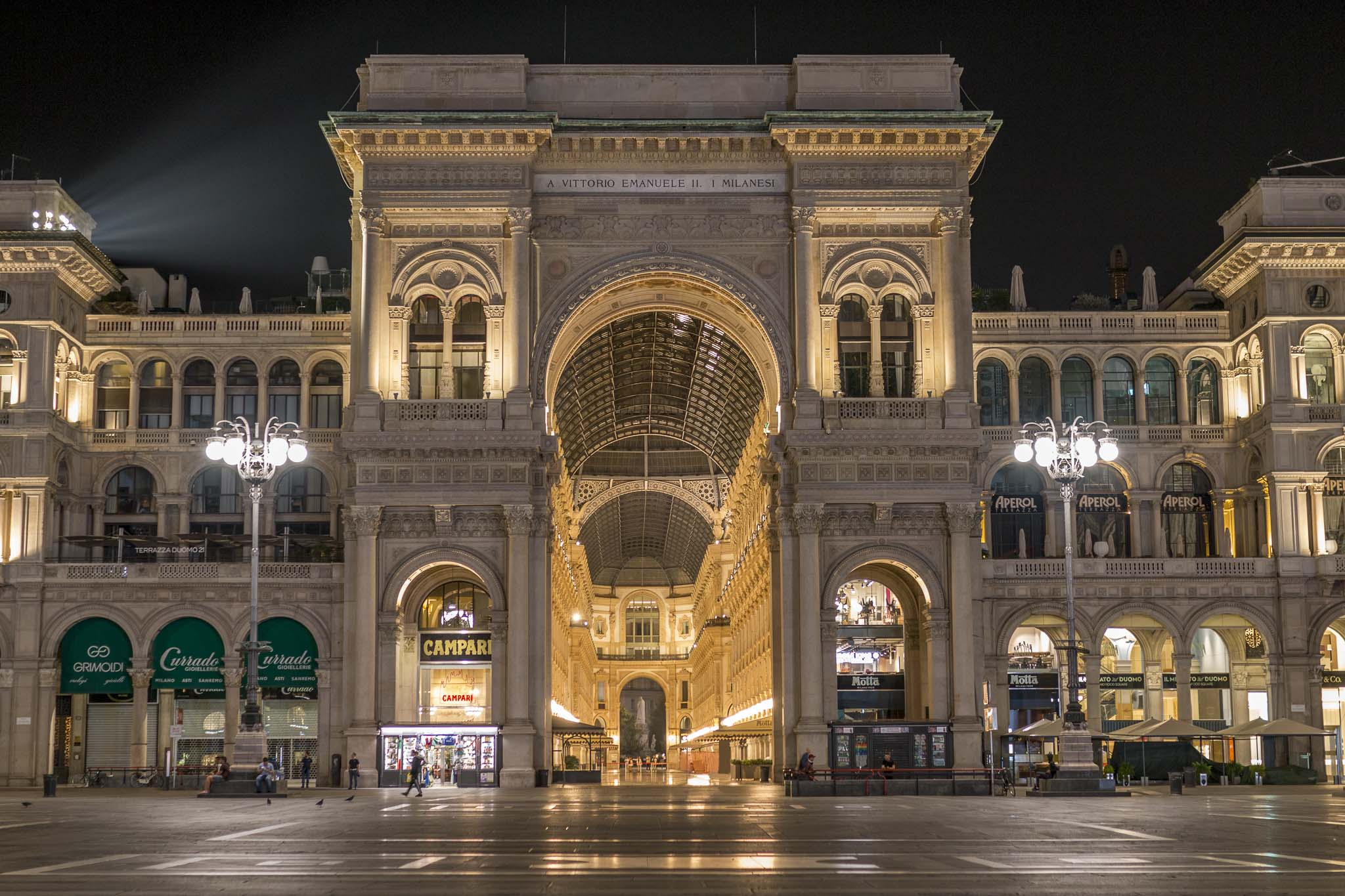
Galleria Vittorio Emanuele II, located in Milan, Italy. Opened in 1870

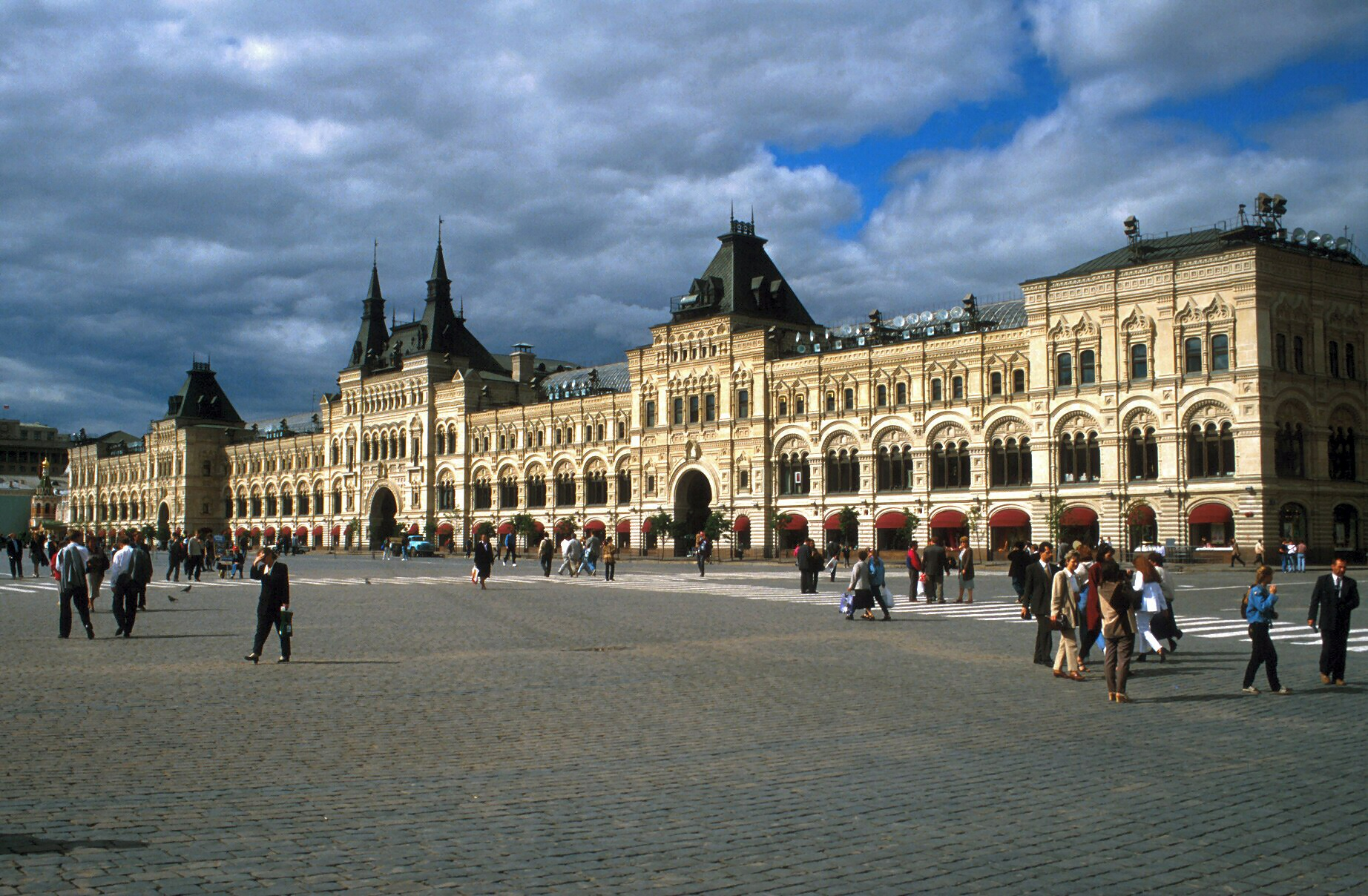
Moscow's GUM. Opened in 1893.

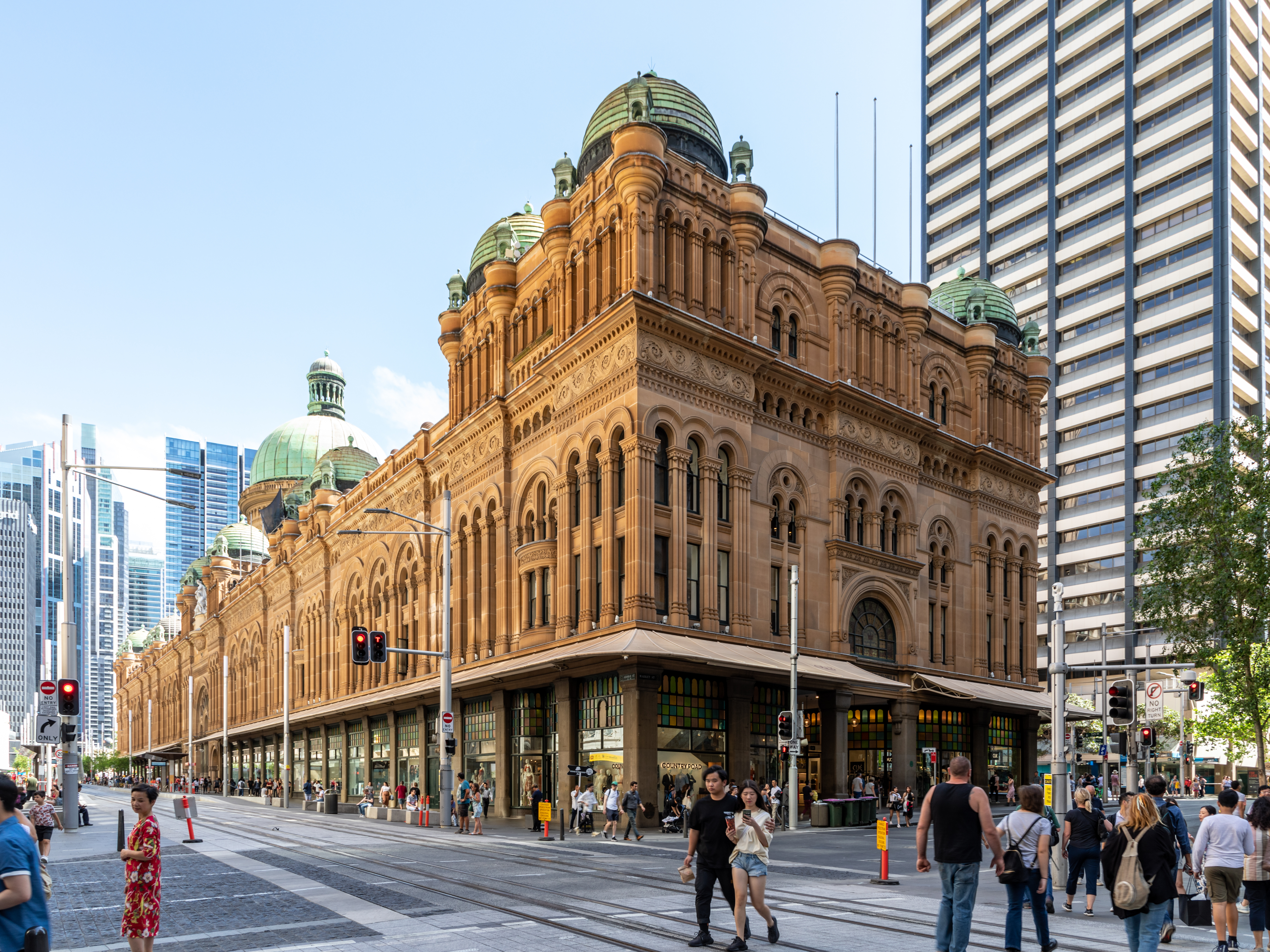
Queen Victoria Building, located in Sydney, New South Wales, Australia. Opened in 1898.

=== Modern shopping center milestones ===
Year	Name	Location	Milestone
1798	Passage du Caire	Paris	First Paris shopping arcade
1828	Westminster Arcade	Providence, RI, US	First shopping arcade in the U.S.
1907	Roland Park Shopping Center	Baltimore, MD, US	First suburban shopping center of any size (six shops)
1913	Nugents	St, Louis, MO, US	First downtown department store to open a suburban branch
1916	Market Square (Lake Forest, Illinois)	Lake Forest, IL, near Chicago, US	First neighborhood shopping center*
1923	Country Club Plaza	Kansas City, MO, US	First regional shopping center*
1928	Bank Block	Grandview Heights, OH, near Columbus, US	First shopping center with more than 1 major chain supermarket
1930**	Suburban Square	Ardmore, PA, near Philadelphia, US	First shopping center with a department store
1947	Broadway-Crenshaw Center	Los Angeles, CA, US	First regional shopping center* with department store(s)
1954	Valley Fair Mall	Appleton, WI near Green Bay, US	First enclosed shopping center/mall other than arcades
1956	Southdale Center	Edina, MN near Minneapolis, US	Second enclosed shopping center/mall other than arcades
1986	West Edmonton Mall	Edmonton, Canada	Largest mall in the world 1986–2004
1992	Mall of America	Bloomington, MN near Minneapolis, US	Largest mall in the U.S. since 1992
2005	South China Mall	Dongguan, China	Largest mall in the world since 2005

Notes: *based on current ICSC shopping center type definitions, **center opened in 1926 without department store, which was added in 1930

=== United States ===
==== Early 20th century centers in the U.S. ====
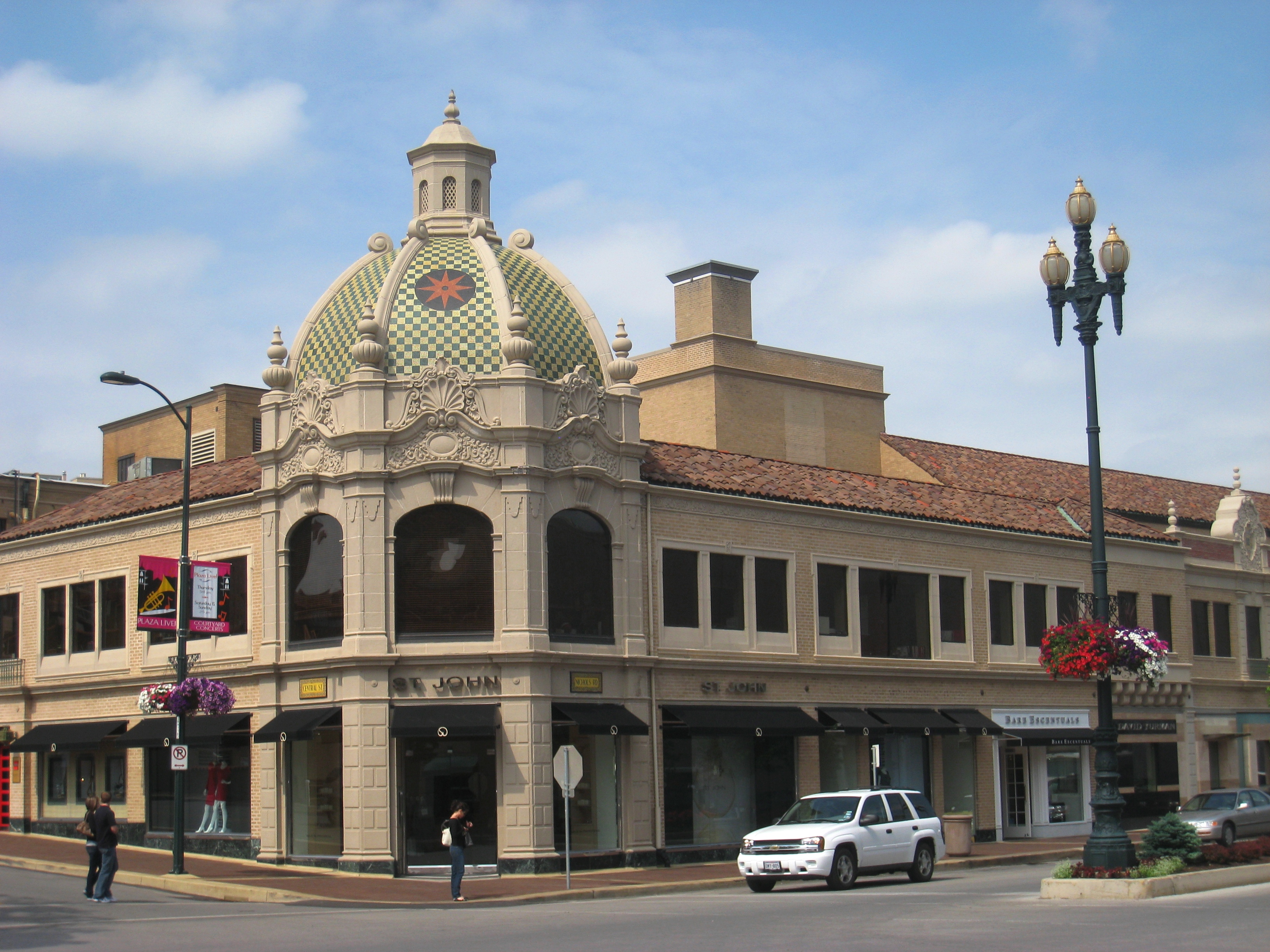
Shops at Country Club Plaza, opened 1923, one of the first planned shopping centers

Early examples of "stores under one roof" include the nine-building shopping arcade Dayton Arcade in Dayton, Ohio (1902–1904), primarily built to rehouse the public food markets in more sanitary conditions, but which added retail clothing and household goods stores. The Lake View Store, opened July 1916, was a collection of stores under one roof aimed at the workers in the company town of Morgan Park, in Duluth, Minnesota.

Before the 1920s–1930s, the term "shopping center" in the U.S. was loosely applied to a collection of retail businesses. A city's downtown might be called a "shopping center". By the 1940s, "shopping center" implied — if not always a single owner — at least, comprehensive planning in the design and business plan, a place built according to an overall program that covered the target market, types of stores and store mix, signs, exterior lighting, and parking.

In the mid-20th century, with the rise of the suburb and automobile culture in the United States, a new style of shopping center was created away from downtown. Early shopping centers designed for the automobile include Market Square, Lake Forest, Illinois (1916), and Country Club Plaza, Kansas City, Missouri, 55 acres (220,000 m^{2}), opened 1923.

The Bank Block in Grandview Heights, Ohio (1928) was an early strip mall or neighborhood center of 30 shops built along Grandview Avenue, with parking in the back for 400 cars. Uniquely for the time, it had multiple national grocery store tenants Kroger, Piggly Wiggly, and the A&P Tea Company. The Park and Shop (1930) in Cleveland Park, Washington, D.C. was an early strip mall or neighborhood center with parking in the front. It was anchored by Piggly Wiggly and built in an L shape.

Other notable, large early centers with strips of independent stores, adjacent parking lots, but no department store anchors, include Highland Park Village (1931) in Dallas; and River Oaks Shopping Center (1937) in Houston.

==== Downtown pedestrian malls and use of term "mall" ====
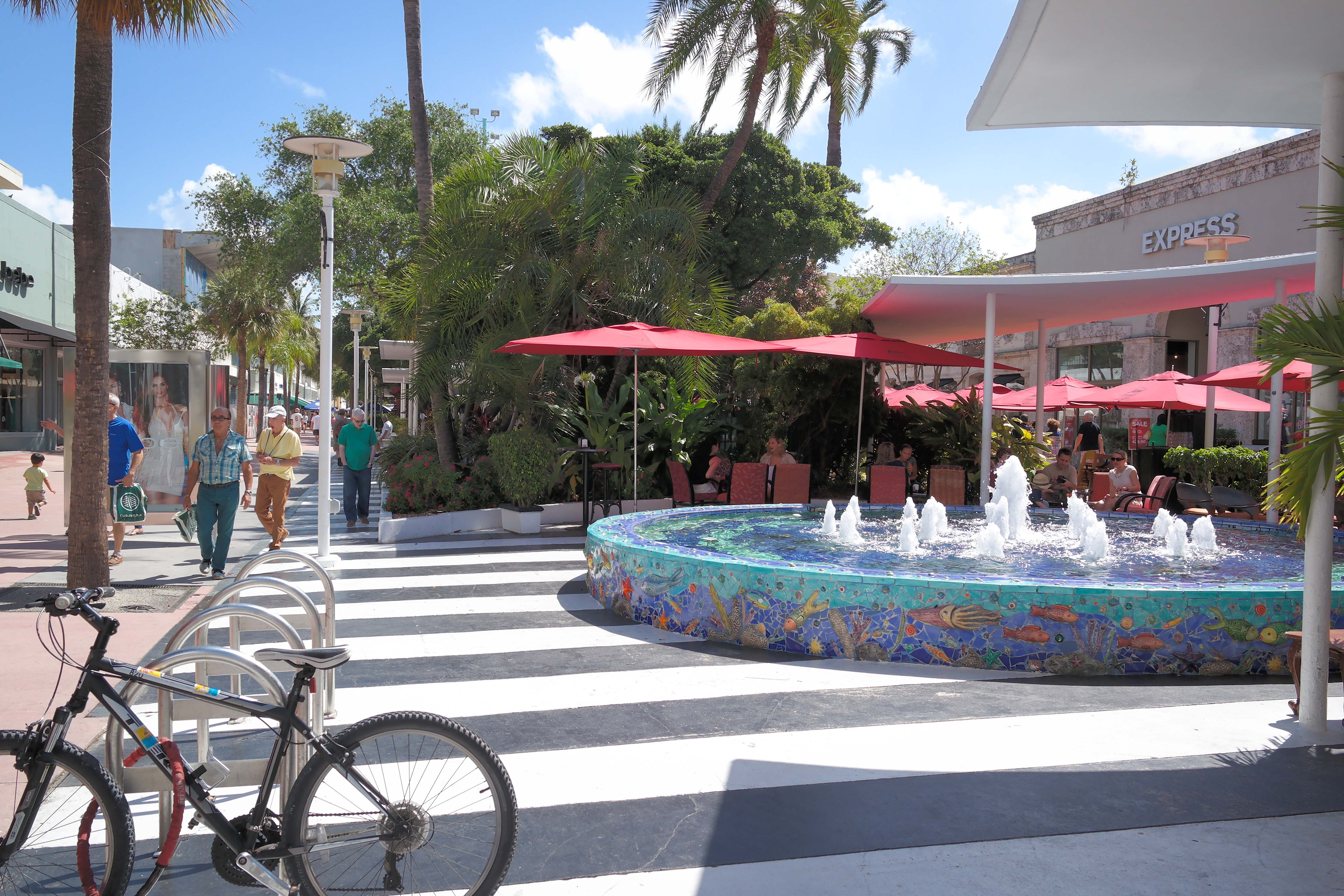
Lincoln Road Mall in Miami Beach, opened 1965, lined with shops, outdoor restaurant seating, fountains and sculptures

In the late 1950s and into the 1960s, the term "shopping mall" was first used, but in the original sense of the word "mall", that is, a pedestrian promenade (in U.K. usage a "shopping precinct"). Early downtown pedestrianized malls included the Kalamazoo Mall (the first, in 1959), "Shoppers' See-Way" in Toledo, Lincoln Road Mall in Miami Beach, Santa Monica Mall (1965), and malls in Fort Worth and in Canada's capital, Ottawa. The downtown Urbana, Illinois mall, converted from a city street, was enclosed, designed by Victor Gruen.

===== Mall as synonym for some types of shopping centers =====
Although Bergen Mall (opened 1957) led other suburban shopping centers in using "mall" in their names, these types of properties were still referred to as "shopping centers" until the late 1960s, when the term "shopping mall" started to be used generically for large suburban shopping centers.

The term "mall" for regional enclosed shopping centers is not used in the U.K.

The term "mall" is used for those types of centers in some markets beyond North America such as India and the United Arab Emirates. In other developing countries such as Namibia and Zambia, "Mall" is found in the names of many small centers that qualify as neighborhood shopping centers or strip malls according to the ICSC.

==== Open-air centers in the U.S. ====
The suburban shopping center concept evolved further with larger open-air shopping centers anchored by major department stores. The first was a center in Ardmore, Pennsylvania later named Suburban Square, when the Philadelphia department store Strawbridge & Clothier opened a four-story, 50,000 sq ft (4,600 m^{2}) branch there on May 12, 1930. A much larger example would be the 550,000-square-foot (51,000 m^{2}) Broadway-Crenshaw Center in Los Angeles built in 1947, anchored by a five-story Broadway and a May Company California.

Two of the largest shopping centers at the time were both in the San Fernando Valley, a suburban area of Los Angeles. They each consisted of one core open-air center and surrounding retail properties with various other owners, which would later hasten their decline as there wasn't a single owner, but rather a merchants' association, which was unable to react quickly to competition in later decades. Valley Plaza opened August 12, 1951. In the mid-1950s, it claimed to be the largest shopping center on the West Coast of the United States and the third-largest in the country. The first part of the Panorama City Shopping Center opened as on October 10, 1955, and would grow until the mid-1960s, it claimed to be the first shopping center with four major department store anchors, even though the "center" was in fact a marketing association for multiple adjacent properties.

Northland Center near Detroit, built 1954, was the first of four centers that Victor Gruen built for Hudson's (Eastland Center, Southland Center, and Westland Center were the others) At launch, Northland Center was the world's largest shopping center.

==== Enclosed "malls" in the U.S. ====
The enclosed shopping mall did not appear until the mid-1950s. One of the earliest examples was the Valley Fair Shopping Center in Appleton, Wisconsin, which opened in March 1955. Valley Fair featured a number of modern features including central heating and cooling, a large outdoor parking area, semi-detached anchor stores, and restaurants. Later that year the world's first fully enclosed shopping mall was opened in Luleå, in northern Sweden (architect: Ralph Erskine) and was named Shopping; the region now claims the highest shopping center density in Europe.

The idea of a regionally-sized, fully enclosed shopping complex was pioneered in 1956 by the Austrian-born architect and American immigrant Victor Gruen. This new generation of regional-size shopping centers began with the Gruen-designed Southdale Center, which opened in the Twin Cities suburb of Edina, Minnesota, United States in October 1956. For pioneering the soon-to-be enormously popular mall concept in this form, Gruen has been called the "most influential architect of the twentieth century" by Canadian writer Malcolm Gladwell.

The first retail complex to be promoted as a "mall" was Paramus, New Jersey's Bergen Mall. The center, which opened with an open-air format in 1957, was enclosed in 1973. Aside from Southdale Center, significant early enclosed shopping malls were Harundale Mall (1958) in Glen Burnie, Maryland, Big Town Mall (1959) in Mesquite, Texas, Chris-Town Mall (1961) in Phoenix, Arizona, and Randhurst Center (1962) in Mount Prospect, Illinois.

Other early malls moved retailing away from the dense, commercial downtowns into the largely residential suburbs. This formula (enclosed space with stores attached, away from downtown, and accessible only by automobile) became a popular way to build retail across the world. Gruen himself came to abhor this effect of his new design; he decried the creation of enormous "land wasting seas of parking" and the spread of suburban sprawl.

Over the next five decades, the United States embarked on a wild shopping center construction spree. American commercial real estate developers built far more shopping centers and malls than could be justified by the country's population, retail sales, or any other economic indicator. The number of American shopping centers exploded from 4,500 in 1960 to 70,000 by 1986 to just under 108,000 by 2010. By the time shopping mall operator Unibail-Rodamco-Westfield decided to get out of the United States in 2022, the United States had an average of 24.5 square feet of retail space per capita (in contrast to 4.5 square feet per capita in Europe).

==== Decline of the mall in the U.S. ====
Since the 1990s, the shopping mall has been in decline because of competition from discount stores and other shopping center formats, from e-commerce and most recently from closures and economic effects of the COVID-19 pandemic.

=== History of shopping centres outside the U.S. ===
==== Canada ====
Don Mills Convenience Centre (now Shops at Don Mills) opened in 1955, in Toronto, Ontario. The first fully enclosed shopping mall in Canada was Wellington Square. It was designed for Eaton's by John Graham, Jr. as an enclosed mall with a department store anchor and subterranean parking which opened in downtown London, Ontario, on August 11, 1960. After several renovations, it remains open today as Citi Plaza.

In the 1970s in Canada, the Ontario government created the Ontario Downtown Renewal Programme, which helped finance the building of several downtown malls across Ontario such as Eaton Centre. The program was created to reverse the tide of small business leaving downtowns for larger sites surrounding the city. In the first quarter of 2012 shopping mall private investment hit an all-time low under 0.1 percent.

==== United Kingdom ====
In the UK, Chrisp Street Market was the first pedestrian shopping area built with a road at the shop fronts. The first mall-type shopping precinct in Great Britain was built in Birmingham's city centre. Known as Bull Ring Centre (now Bull Ring, Birmingham), it was officially dedicated in May 1964. A notable example is the Halton Lea Shopping Centre (originally known as Shopping City) in Runcorn, which opened in 1972 and was conceived as the centre point for the new town's development. Another early example is the Brent Cross Shopping Centre, Britain's first out-of-town shopping centre and located on the northern outskirts of London, which was opened in March 1976. In the current era, shopping centres are found commonly all across the country.

==== Australia ====
Chermside Drive-In Shopping Centre started trading to the public in 1957, in Brisbane, Australia.

== See also ==
- Alley
- Arcade
- Bazaar
- Lists of shopping malls
- Mall kiosk
- Market (place)
- Retail format
- Shopping mall
