= Maus Frères =

Swiss holding company

Maus Frères SA (French for "Maus Brothers") is a Swiss holding company founded in 1892 by Ernest and Henri Maus. The company most notably owns the Manor department store and Lacoste.

== History ==
In 1892 Ernest and Henri Maus opened the mercantile and hosiery wholesale business Maus Fréres in Bienne.

The business was moved to Geneva in 1901.

In 1902 Léon Nordmann of the Kaufhaus Normann department store entered into a partnership with Ernest and Henri.

In 1938, Maus Fréres acquired the Bergner's department store company based in Peoria, Illinois. P. A. Bergner & Co. also acquired Boston Store in 1985 and Carson Pirie Scott in 1989

Its oldest business remains the Manor department store chain, which gets its name from founders' names "Maus" and "Nordmann".

Up until 1991, Maus also owned Printemps in France (acquired 1972) and the Bergner's, Boston Store, and Carson Pirie Scott department store chains in the Midwestern United States. After losing control of Bergner's in 1991, P. A. Bergner & Co. filed for Chapter 11 bankruptcy that same year, and emerged from bankruptcy in 1993 under the name Carson Pirie Scott & Co. It was then acquired by Proffitt's (which soon became Saks, Inc.) in 1998, and sold to The Bon-Ton in 2006, which filed for bankruptcy and liquidated in 2018

Maus Frères announced the sale of the DIY brand Jumbo to the Coop group in April 2021.

== Holdings ==
List of Maus Frères holding
Name	Year acquired	Year divested	Year founded	Notes
Manor (Note: as Leon Nordmann till)	1902	n/a	1902	Department store
Manor Food	1952	n/a	1952	Supermarket
Maus Frères Shopping Centers	1974	n/a	1974	Shopping malls
Manora Restaurant	1982	n/a	1982	Restaurants
Aigle	2003	n/a	1853	Outdoor clothing and footwear
Gant	2008	n/a	1949	Clothing
Lacoste	2012	n/a	1933	Designer sportswear
Tecnifibre	2017	n/a	1979	Sporting equipment

List of divested Maus Frères holding
Name	Year acquired	Year divested	Year founded	Notes
Haushalt	1914		1914	
Magazine zur Rheinbrucke	1932		1932	Department store
Bergner's	1938	1992	1889	Department store
Nouvelles Galeries	1953		1897	Department store
Printemps	1972	1991	1865	Department store, acquired as part of Groupe Printemps
Prisunic	1972	1991	1931	Variety store, acquired as part of Groupe Printemps
Brummel	1972			acquired as part of Groupe Printemps
Armand Thierry	1972	1991	1841	acquired as part of Groupe Printemps
La Redoute	1972	1991	1837	acquired as part of Groupe Printemps
Viniprix	1972			acquired as part of Groupe Printemps
Euromarché	1972	1991	1968	acquired as part of Groupe Printemps
JUMBO	1974	2021		
Do-It-Yourself	1974	2021		
Boston Store	1985	1992	1897	Owned by Bergner's
City Disc	1985	2001	1985	Record store
Carson Pirie Scott	1989	1992	1854	Department store
Electroplus	1994	2001	1994	Consumer electronics store
Jeans & Co.	1994	2001	1994	Streetwear boutique
Athleticum	1995	2018/2022	1995	Sporting goods megastore, Majority shareholding sold to Decathlon 2018. Final stake sold in 2022.
ParaSHOP	1995	2014		Drugstore
Devanlay	1998			
FLY (Switzerland)	1998	2012		Lifestyle furnishings store
Carrefour (Switzerland)	2000	2007		
Accarda	2007	2018		
EBOUTIC	2011	2016/2022		51% sold in 2016, final holdings sold in 2022.
The Kooples	2019	2025	2008	
