= R. Brad Martin =

American politician

Interim President of the University of Memphis
- In office July 1, 2013 – May 16, 2014
- Preceded by: Shirley Raines
- Succeeded by: M. David Rudd

Member of the Tennessee House of Representatives
- In office January 13, 1973 – January 11, 1983
- Preceded by: Constituency established
- Succeeded by: W. A. "Dub" Nance
- Constituency: 93rd district (1973–1975); 94th district (1975–1983)

Personal details
- Born: Robert Bradley Martin; November 5, 1951 (age 74) Memphis, Tennessee, U.S.
- Party: Republican
- Education: University of Memphis (BS); Vanderbilt University (MBA)
- Occupation: Businessman
- Known for: Chairman and CEO of Saks, Inc. (1989–2007); Chairman of the Board of FedEx Corporation

Robert Bradley Martin (born November 5, 1951) is an American businessman and former politician. He is the chairman of the board of directors of FedEx, chairman of investment firm RBM Venture Company, and the former chief executive officer of Saks, the department store company he built from the regional retailer Proffitt's.

From 1973 to 1983, Martin served five terms in the Tennessee House of Representatives. At the time he was elected, he was still a college student. He later served as interim president of the University of Memphis from 2013 to 2014.

== Early life and education ==
Robert Brad Martin was born on November 5, 1951, and raised in Tennessee. He earned a BS from the University of Memphis in 1976, where he served as president of the student body, and an MBA from the Owen Graduate School of Management at Vanderbilt University in 1980. He later received an honorary Doctor of Letters degree from the University of Memphis. In college, he became a member of Kappa Alpha Order.

== Political career ==
In the 1970s, while a student, Martin became the youngest person elected to the Tennessee House of Representatives. He served five terms in the state legislature before leaving politics for a career in business.

== Business career ==
=== Proffitt's and Saks ===
After making early investments in real estate, Martin became the principal investor in RBM Acquisition Company, which acquired Proffitt's, a department store chain based in East Tennessee, in 1984. He became chief executive officer of Proffitt's in 1989.

Under Martin's leadership, Proffitt's pursued a strategy of acquisitions including McRae's, Younkers, Parisian, Herberger's, and Carson Pirie Scott, and grew into one of the largest department store businesses in the United States, with annual revenues of approximately $4 billion. In 1998, Proffitt's acquired Saks Holdings, the parent of luxury retailer Saks Fifth Avenue, for $2.1 billion and renamed the combined company Saks Incorporated.

The Saks Fifth Avenue division faced declining sales in the years following the acquisition. During Martin's tenure as CEO and chairman, the company's stock value increased more than twelvefold. He stepped down as CEO in 2006 and retired as chairman in May 2007.

=== Other ventures ===
In 1987, Martin co-founded Corporate Child Care, Inc., a provider of employer-sponsored child care that grew into the largest corporate-affiliated child care company in the United States. After retiring from Saks, he founded RBM Venture Company, a private investment firm.

Martin joined the board of directors of FedEx Corporation in 2011 and served as vice chairman before being elected chairman of the board in June 2025, following the death of company founder Frederick W. Smith. He assumed the role of executive chairman in September 2025.

Martin served as non-executive chairman of the board of Chesapeake Energy from 2015 to 2021, during which time the company restructured its management and reduced its debt before entering and emerging from Chapter 11 bankruptcy proceedings amid the 2020 collapse in oil prices. In 2021, he founded Riverview Acquisition Corp., a special-purpose acquisition company that merged with Westrock Coffee in August 2022; Martin remains a member of Westrock Coffee's board of directors.

== University of Memphis ==
Martin served as interim president of the University of Memphis, his alma mater, from July 2013 to May 2014.

== Writing ==
Martin is a co-author of Five Stones: Conquering Your Giants, published by Abingdon Press.
