= Mergers and acquisitions in the United States retail sector =

Mergers and acquisitions in the United States retail sector refer to the consolidation of retail companies through corporate takeovers, mergers, and strategic purchases, reflecting broader economic, technological, and cultural changes in American consumer markets. Since the early 20th century, the retail industry has experienced waves of consolidation shaped by shifts in consumer behavior, transportation, and technology.

Early developments were driven by the rise of chain stores and department store conglomerates that capitalized on economies of scale and standardized formats. Following World War II, suburban expansion and the rise of shopping malls transformed retail geography and fueled the growth of regional and national department store chains. By the late 20th century, mergers and acquisitions had become a key strategy for retailers seeking efficiency, scale, and stronger brands. The digital revolution of the 1990s and 2000s further reshaped the sector, as traditional retailers consolidated to compete with online rivals and e-commerce firms acquired companies to build logistics and technology capacity.

In the 21st century, the pace of consolidation has continued, influenced by globalization, private equity activity, and the integration of digital and physical sales channels. Major transactions ranging from department store mergers to acquisitions involving e-commerce platforms, grocery chains, and specialty retailers have redefined the structure of American retail.

== Historical development ==
=== Early retail consolidation (1900s-1950s) ===
In the early 20th century, the American retail industry experienced significant consolidation with the rise of chain stores and department store conglomerates. This period saw the adoption of standardized store formats and the use of economies of scale, which helped establish the basis of modern retail.

The growth of chain stores accelerated during the 1910s and 1920s. Companies such as the Great Atlantic & Pacific Tea Company (A&P) revolutionized grocery retail by implementing uniform store designs and vertically integrated supply chains. Between 1914 and 1919, A&P expanded from 650 to 4,224 locations, doubling that number by 1923.

By the early 1930s, chain stores dominated the grocery market. From 1919 to 1932, the top five grocery chains increased their market share from 4.2% to 28.8%. Improved transportation and centralized distribution enabled these chains to operate extensive networks, benefiting from bulk purchasing and lower costs. While the individual stores often resembled independent retailers, the main efficiencies were achieved through centralized management and logistics.

=== Post-war expansion and malls (1950s-1980s) ===
Following World War II, American retail underwent major changes, shaped by suburban growth, shopping malls, and bigger retail chains.

The first enclosed shopping mall in the United States opened in 1956 in Edina, Minnesota. It was designed by Victor Gruen, an Austrian-born architect who immigrated to the U.S. in 1938. Gruen envisioned malls as community centers that would include not only stores but also services like schools, medical offices, and housing. His design became widely adopted, and by 1985, about 2,500 shopping malls had been built across the country.

Department stores played a key role in mall development, often serving as anchor tenants. Mall developers offered incentives to attract these stores, creating a mutually beneficial relationship that supported the growth of both malls and department store chains during the postwar era.

During the postwar period, regional department stores grew across the United States. In New York City, major stores included Macy's, Bloomingdale's, Lord & Taylor, Gimbels, and Abraham & Straus. Boston had Jordan Marsh and Filene's, while Chicago was home to Marshall Field's and Carson Pirie Scott. In Atlanta, Rich's and Davison's were prominent. Each store developed a distinct identity, with some known for specific departments such as toys, books, or fashion, and many featuring in-store tearooms or restaurants.

These stores typically began in downtown areas and expanded into suburban locations after World War II. Shopping at department stores was often considered a special occasion, and many families dressed formally for visits. The stores offered a wide range of products, including clothing, footwear, furniture, appliances, kitchenware, sporting goods, and home textiles.

=== Digital era (1990s-present) ===
In the 1990s, retail shifted through mergers and the growth of digital technology. Many regional department stores in the United States faced pressure from national chains and specialty retailers. This competition led to a series of mergers and acquisitions, as companies consolidated to reduce costs, centralize operations, and strengthen national brands.

Some smaller retailers, such as Proffitt's in the southern United States, played a major role in consolidation. From 1988 to 1998, Proffitt's expanded by 340 stores and added 31.6 million square feet of retail space. By 1999, its revenue exceeded $6.4 billion, following its acquisition of Saks Holdings in 1998.

The trend continued into the early 2000s. In 2005, May Department Stores and Federated Department Stores, which had reported 2004 sales of $14.4 billion and $15.6 billion respectively, merged to form a company that accounted for about 35% of U.S. department store sales. This marked a major change in an industry that had been restructuring for decades.

=== E-commerce revolution ===
In the early 2000s, e-commerce began to change the retail sector. Its impact was initially limited in areas such as groceries, where many consumers preferred in-person shopping, but it quickly reshaped other categories. Over the following two decades, e-commerce contributed to a shift from traditional stores to omnichannel retail, driven by new competition, technological advances, and changing consumer behavior.

The digital transformation of retail accelerated in the 2010s and 2020s. Retailers adopted technologies such as artificial intelligence for personalization, automated inventory systems, and data analytics. Digital tools were increasingly applied across both customer-facing and back-end operations.
