= County Seat (store) =

American clothing retail

- Industry: Retail
- Founded: 1973
- Defunct: 1999
- Fate: Bankruptcy
- Headquarters: Dallas, Texas, United States
- Number of locations: 740+
- Area served: U.S.
- Key people: Jack J. Crocker; Carson Pirie Scott
- Products: Blue jeans; clothing

County Seat was an American clothing retailer founded in 1973. With more than 740 stores at its peak, the chain closed in 1999 following Chapter 11 bankruptcy.

== History ==
Jack J. Crocker, then the CEO of SuperValu supermarkets, founded the chain in 1973 in Dallas. Appropriate for the pun in its name, County Seat specialized in blue jeans and other casual wear. In 1977, the chain grew to 183 stores, and also began to sell sports clothing.

In 1983, it was sold to the Carson Pirie Scott department store chain of Chicago, who bought County Seat for $71 million (~$187 million in 2024). In 1985, Carson Pirie Scott acquired the 19-store Pants Corral company from Giant Food of Landover, Maryland, and converted them to County Seat. Carson Pirie Scott redesigned the chain's stores with matte black fixtures and re-focused the merchandise line to target high schoolers. The chain had 415 stores in 1989, at which point Bergner's in Peoria, Illinois acquired Carson Pirie Scott and sold County Seat to a new management team. In 1992, they had over 500 stores by selling a mix of Levis and store brand jeans and matching casual wear.

Wet Seal of Los Angeles offered to buy 508 stores of the County Seat chain in 1996, but was rejected. County Seat filed for Chapter 11 bankruptcy protection in late 1996 and began to close stores. County Seat filed for bankruptcy again in 1999.
