= Golden East Crossing =

Coordinates: 35.97491°N 77.80640°W

- Location: Rocky Mount, North Carolina, United States
- Address: 1100 North Wesleyan Boulevard
- Opened: August 6, 1986; 40 years ago
- Developer: Cadillac Fairview
- Manager: JLL
- Owner: OKOA Capital LLC
- Num. of stores: 50+
- Num. of anchor tenants: 7
- Floor area: 574,172 sq ft (53,342.3 m^{2})
- Floors: 1
- Website: goldeneastcrossing.com

Golden East Crossing is a shopping mall in Rocky Mount, North Carolina, United States. Opened in 1986, the mall features Belk, Books-A-Million, Dunham's Sports, J. C. Penney, and Ross Dress for Less. It is managed by Hendon Properties.

== History ==
The original anchor stores of Golden East Crossing were J. C. Penney, Roses, and Belk. Sears would also open its store in fall 1987. The mall was developed by Cadillac Fairview.

Brody's, the successor to Roses, was sold to Proffitt's in 1998. Best Buy was added in November 2004. The same year, a movie theater operated by Cinema Grill closed.

The mall was owned by General Growth Properties for nine years, then sold to Cadillac Fairview, and again to current owners Hendon Properties in 2005.

Proffitt's was closed in 2005. Part of the store became Bed Bath & Beyond that year, while the rest became Ross Dress for Less a year later. Petco was added in 2008. Best Buy and Sears both closed in 2012. A year later, Dunham's Sports was confirmed to be opening in the vacated Sears. Petco closed on January 24, 2015. Bed Bath & Beyond closed at the mall in 2016, while the same year, Conn's opened in the spaces previously occupied by Petco and Best Buy. Fallas opened in the former Bed Bath & Beyond on July 26, 2018, however it closed not long after.

Post Covid (2020), Shoe Show, Victoria's Secret, GNC, Rue21 (bankruptcy), Shoe Department, Footlocker, FootActionUSA, Journeys, YURP, Aeropostale have closed leaving major gaps while all department stores are in place.

A 'Bags and Bins" store moved into the former Bed, Bath, & Beyond store/ Former Fallas and still operates today.

In December 2023, Kohan Retail purchased the mall while in foreclosure as they do with most distressed malls.

July 2024, Conn's Home Plus announced their 40,000 sq ft location would be closing as they chain filed for bankruptcy. The store closed at the end of September.

October 2024, Bath & Body Works announced plans to vacate the mall as they are building a new store at the Cobb's Corner Wal-Mart anchored Shopping Center.

As of October 2024, The only national chain stores that remain reopen are The Children's Place, Jimmy Jazz, Lids, Hibbett Sports, American Eagle Outfitters, Kids Footlocker, Finish Line.

October 2025, OKOA Capital foreclosed on the senior loan to Kohan Retail and took possession of the mall. They are currently undergoing an extensive revitalization of the mall to bring new customers and stores into the mall.

January 2025, American Eagle Outfitters closed. Now leaving the following national chains inside of the mall: The Children's Place, Jimmy Jazz, Lid, Hibbett Sports, Kids Footlocker, and Finish Line. A local furniture store (Raleigh Outlet) has moved into the former Conn's Homeplus store. More stores and brands continue to open in the mall, driving new shopping choices for customers.
