= The Shoppes at Grand Prairie =

Shopping center in Peoria, Illinois

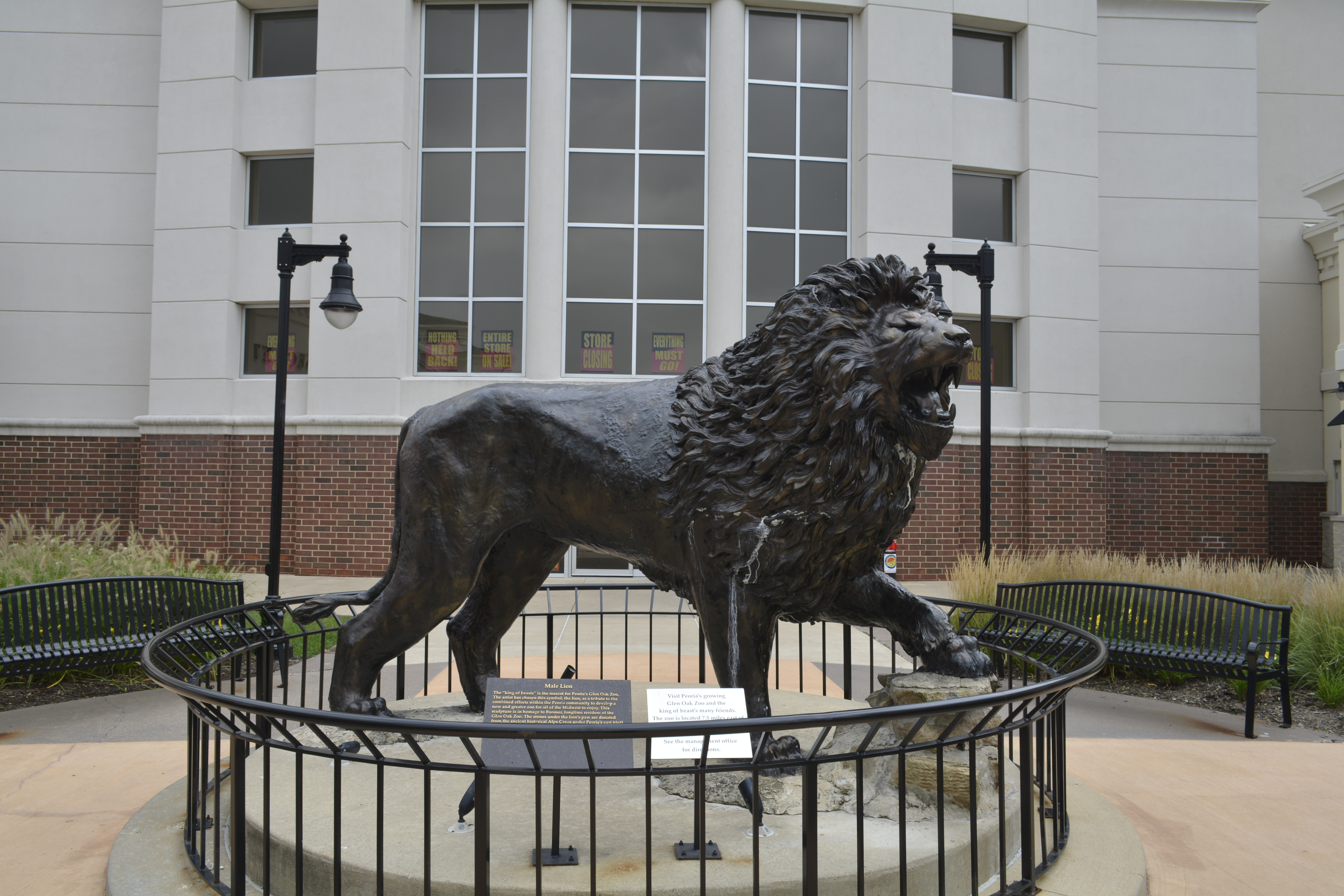
- Lion statue at the mall
- Location: Peoria, Illinois, U.S.
- Coordinates: 40°46′48″N 89°40′24″W
- Address: 5201 West War Memorial Drive
- Opened: April 2003; 23 years ago
- Num. of stores: 75
- Num. of anchor tenants: 5 (2 open, 3 closed)
- Floors: 1 (2 in Bergner's)
- Public transit: Greater Peoria Mass Transit District
- Website: www.shoppesatgrandprairie.com

The Shoppes at Grand Prairie is an outdoor lifestyle center in Peoria, Illinois, United States, which opened in April 2003. It features Dick's Sporting Goods, Marshalls and many more stores. Original stores include At Home, Bergner's, Galyan's, Borders, and Linens N Things.

== History ==
Famous Dave's opened in 1996 and closed in 2022. Seven years later in 2003, The Shoppes at Grand Prairie held its grand opening with Bergner's and Galyan's. Also in 2003, AMC Theatres opened along with the mall. In October of that same year, all Galyan's stores became Dick's Sporting Goods. In 2005, Buffalo Wild Wings opened to customers. In 2006, a strip plaza with a Gordmans and a Hy-Vee opened to the left of the mall. In 2009, all Linens N Things Store closed as part of bankruptcy, followed by Borders in 2011. City of Peoria HRT taxable retail sales fell during the recession, with sales recovering subsequently, reaching about $15 billion in 2013. H&M opened at The Shoppes at Grand Prairie on December 18, 2015 and closed in January 2021. In late August 2018, Bergner's closed along with all Bon-Ton locations due to bankruptcy. At Home moved into the vacated Bergner's space in 2022, and closed on August 24, 2025 as part of a plan to close 26 stores nationwide.

== See also ==
- Northwoods Mall (Illinois)
