= Northwoods Mall =

Northwoods Mall may refer to:

- Northwoods Mall (Peoria, Illinois)
- Northwoods Mall (North Charleston, South Carolina)
