= Mounds Mall =

Shopping mall in Anderson, Indiana, US (1965–2018)

Coordinates: 40°05′47″N 85°39′20″W

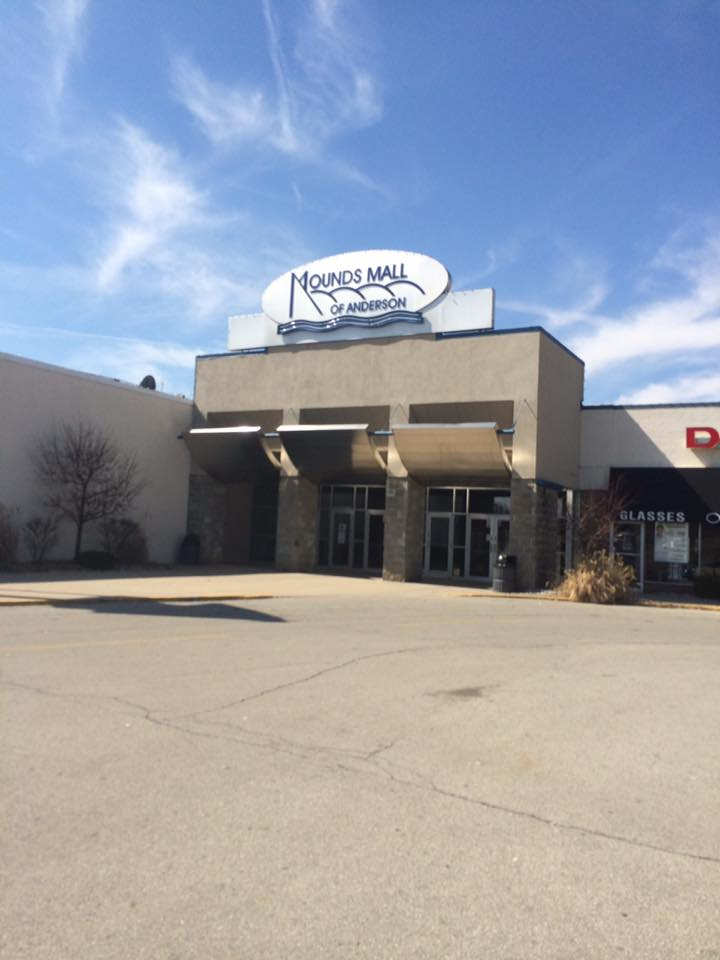
- The mall's south entrance in 2018
- Location: Anderson, Indiana, United States
- Opened: 1964 (Montgomery Ward and Wasson's) 1965 (Entire Mall Complex)
- Closed: April 1, 2018
- Developer: Melvin Simon & Associates
- Num. of stores: approx. 30
- Num. of anchor tenants: 4
- Floor area: 300,000 sq ft (28,000 m^{2})
- Floors: 1
- Public transit: CATS

Mounds Mall was an enclosed shopping mall in Anderson, Indiana, United States. Opened in stages between 1964 and 1965, it was one of the first enclosed malls developed by Melvin Simon & Associates, now known as Simon Property Group. The mall's original anchor stores were H. P. Wasson and Company, Montgomery Ward, and JCPenney; over time, the Wasson store became Meis, Elder-Beerman, and Carson's, while Montgomery Ward became Sears and JCPenney was torn down and rebuilt as a movie theater. After a period of decline, Mounds Mall closed to the public in April 2018. The movie theater closed a year later, leaving no businesses in the building.

== History ==
Mounds Mall was developed by Melvin Simon & Associates (now Simon Property Group), opening in 1965 as the second mall in Indiana (Evansville's fully enclosed Washington Square began business in October 1963).

The mall officially opened in April 1965, although anchor stores Montgomery Ward and H. P. Wasson and Company had opened the previous November. Original tenants included Zales, Kroger, Woolworth, and Jo-Ann Fabrics.

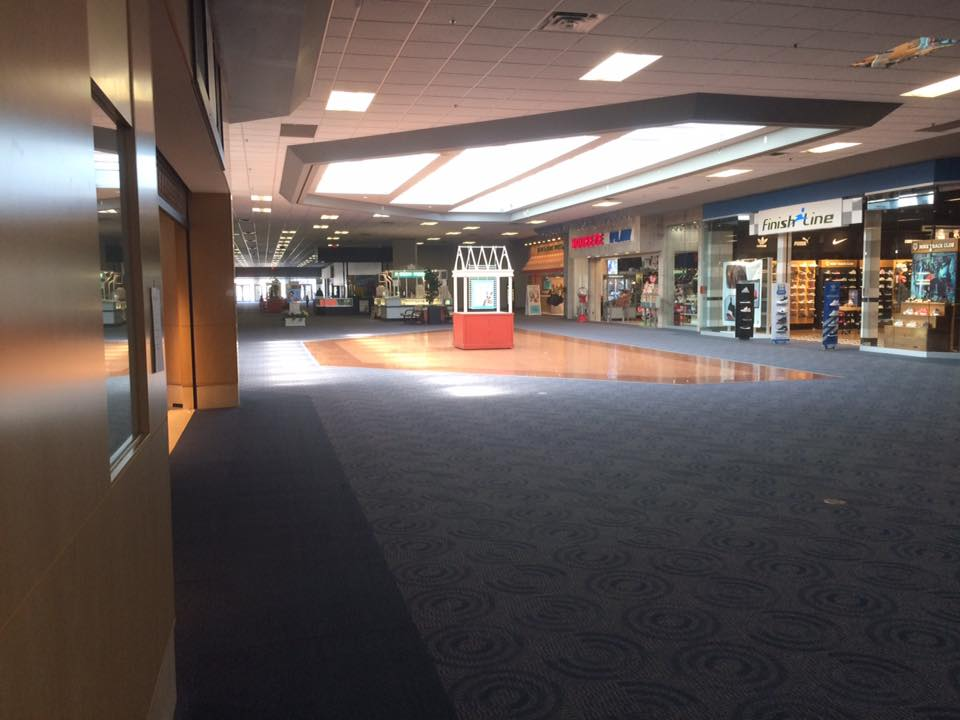
Interior of Mounds Mall in March 2018

Montgomery Ward closed and became Sears in 1983. Also in the 1980s, the Wasson's store closed. Meis opened a store around a year later. Meis was rebranded into Elder-Beerman in 1989, and finally Carson's in 2011. In 2012, the Sears closed as a result of low sales of the 2011 holiday season. On January 31, 2018, The Bon-Ton announced that Carson's would be closing as part of a plan to close 42 stores nationwide. The store closed on April 29, 2018. Shortly later, it was announced that the whole mall would close along with the Carson's. The mall closed on April 1, 2018. The attached movie theater closed before 2019. By 2021, the whole property had been boarded up.

== See also ==
- List of shopping malls in the United States
