= Northland Mall (Sterling, Illinois) =

Shopping mall in Sterling, Illinois

- Location: Sterling, Illinois, United States
- Coordinates: 41.806374°N 89.664297°W
- Address: 2900 E Lincolnway
- Opened: February 27, 1973; 53 years ago
- Developer: Jack Jacobs & Company
- Manager: Brookwood Capital Partners LLC
- Num. of stores: 14
- Num. of anchor tenants: 4
- Floor area: 302,680 sq ft (28,120 m^{2})
- Floors: 1

Northland Mall is a 302,680-square-foot (28,120 m^{2}) shopping mall in Sterling, Illinois. First opened in 1973, it features 14 stores, Dunham's Sports, Planet Fitness and two former anchor stores which were JCPenney and Bergner's.

== History ==
On February 27, 1973, Northland Mall officially opened to the public. It was built by Chananie Development. Original tenants included JCPenney, Charles V. Weise department store (later sold to Bergner's), Woolworth, and Walgreens.

Dunham's Sports would open on October 24, 2014 as a new anchor store. Just eight months later, a tornado caused wall and roof damage to the store. Shoppers and employees were inside the building at the time of the storm, but no injuries were reported. The store would eventually reopen a year later on August 7, 2016.

In late 2016, Planet Fitness opened at the mall. It replaced the Pet Supplies Plus which closed in June 2014.

On March 17, 2017, JCPenney announced the Northland Mall location's closure, along with 137 others. Bergner's went bankrupt the following year.

== Redevelopment ==
In early 2022, Brookwood Capital Partners acquired the shopping mall from the previous owners and began the process of redevelopment. The company has a history of retail and mall redevelopment in the Midwest with several large regional malls under their belt and have previously brought similar malls to full occupancy, and are expecting to do the same here.

== New Hobby Lobby ==
As a part of ongoing redevelopment, Hobby Lobby announced their upcoming opening in Northland Mall.

The company is taking the former Bergners space which will bring the center closer to 100% occupancy. Capital improvements such as new asphalt and updated roof have further enhanced the centers prominence. Brookwood Capital Partners acquired the shopping mall from the previous owners and began the process of redevelopment.
