= Club Libby Lu =

American children's retailer

- Logo used from 2000 to 2009
- Industry: Retail
- Founded: August 2000
- Founder: Mary Drolet
- Defunct: Early 2009
- Fate: Liquidation
- Headquarters: United States
- Products: Clothing, makeup, stuffed animals, perfume
- Parent: Saks, Inc.

Club Libby Lu was an experiential/experience-based retailer for young girls ages 4 to 12. Founded by Mary Drolet, a former executive at Claire's and Montgomery Ward, in August 2000, the store chain employed 98 stores in 28 states in the United States before closing in 2009. The stores were named after founder Mary Drolet's childhood imaginary friend.

A makeover cost between $25–$60, depending on the package of choice, and included a full hair updo, nail polish, and makeup. In addition to playing dress-up for the day, Club Libby Lu VIPs (Very Important Princesses) were guided by their Club Counselors over to various sites including a "potion bar" where a VIP could make their own lotion, perfume, fairy dust, or lip gloss, and a Pooch Parlor, where the guests could own stuffed animals of their choice. At the end of every experience, each VIP was encouraged to join the free club, and was given a friendship bracelet.

== History ==
Club Libby Lu was opened in 2000 by Mary Drolet and her two partners in a suburban Chicago mall based on the three partners' concepts. In 2003, Saks, Inc. purchased Club Libby Lu when it had 11 stores. 50 locations were opened in 2004. With a bit of advertising by 2005, revenues were about $46 million, a 53% increase over 2004. In 2006, the chain had 87 locations.

Two former Club Libby Lu customers, Priscilla Ceballos of Garland, Texas and her then-6-year-old daughter Alexis Menjivar, made national headlines in late December 2007 when Ceballos forced Alexis to write a fake essay about her father named Jonathon Menjivar as part of a contest held by the company where the winner would receive a Grand Prize of four tickets to a Hannah Montana concert in Albany, New York. In the essay, Priscilla explained that her husband Jonathon died in Iraq via a roadside bomb while serving in the army. While Alexis was getting a makeover in preparation for the concert at the Club Libby Lu store in Garland, reporter Byron Harris of ABC affiliate WFAA in Dallas went to the store as part of an investigation for the station and informed Ceballos that there was no man by that name who had ever served in the military or died in Iraq. After the story surfaced and gained national attention, Alexis was disqualified and the tickets were awarded to another winner, who was not identified.

In early November 2008, parent company Saks Incorporated announced that due to the dismal state of the economy they would be closing all 98 locations.
