= Aigle (company) =

French company

- Company type: Private
- Industry: Textile
- Founded: 1853
- Headquarters: Montargis, France
- Key people: • Hiram Hutchinson, founder
- Revenue: 120,000,000 euros (2005)
- Website: www.aigle.com

Aigle is a French footwear and textile company founded in 1853 as the Compagnie du Caoutchouc Souple (Flexible Rubber Company) in Montargis (France) by the American businessman Hiram Hutchinson.

Hutchison had obtained a license in 1850 from fellow American Charles Goodyear's patented vulcanization process. He emigrated to France where he applied the new process to the production of Wellington boots and then raincoats. In the 20th century the company expanded into the production of accessories for the motor industry and, from the 1950s, sports shoes.

In 1967 the company, by now long renamed Aigle, moved manufacturing to Ingrandes, near Châtellerault, on a 30 hectare site where around 10,000 pairs of shoes are produced annually.

Beginning in 2000 the company expanded into Japan and the United States. In 2006 there were 131 stores worldwide, of which 61 were in France, 14 elsewhere in Europe, and 56 in Asia. Gross sales for the 2005 fiscal year were around 120 million euros.

In 2005 majority ownership of the company was purchased by Swiss group Maus Frères.

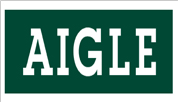
previous logo

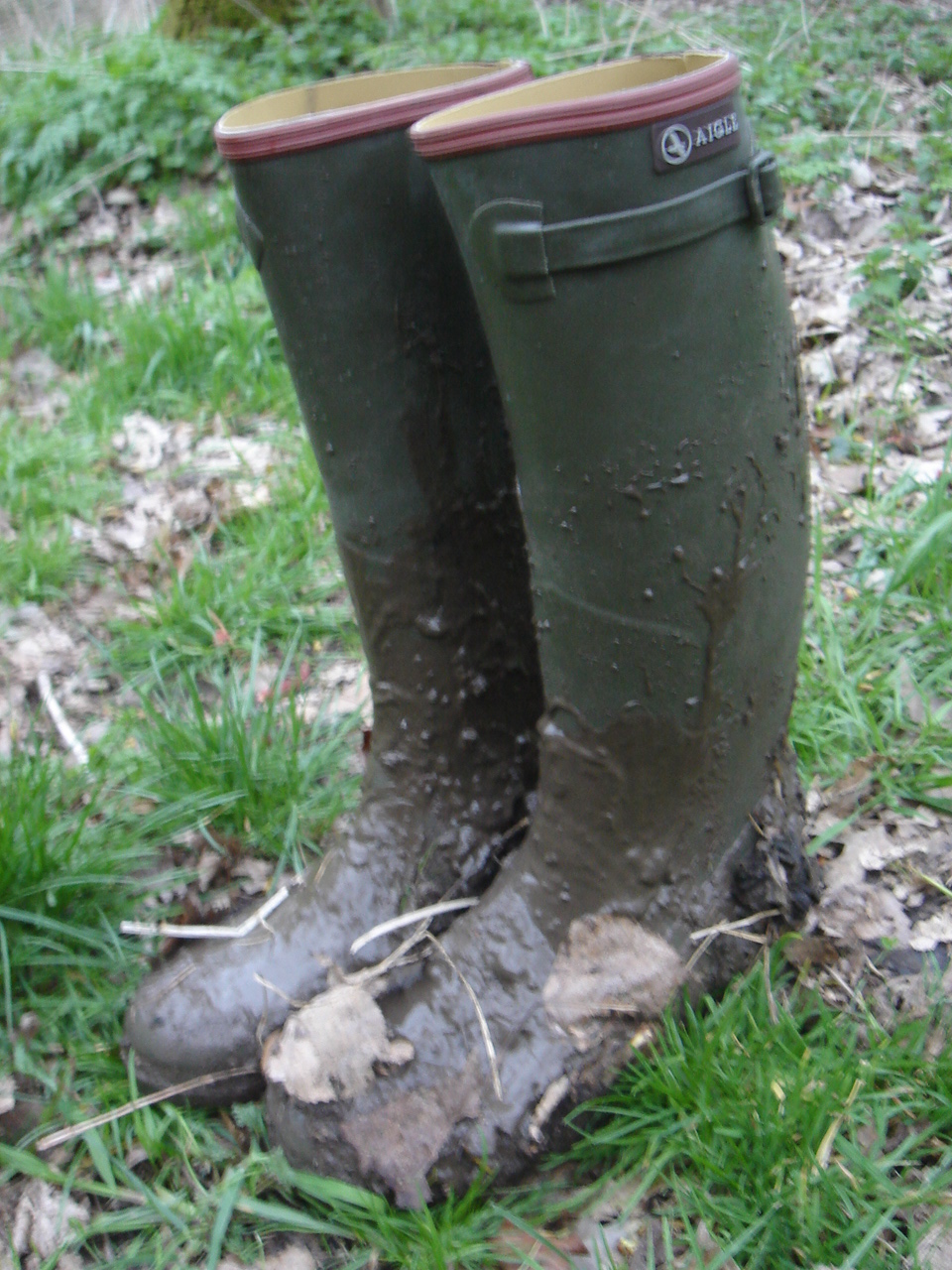
Boots
