= Boston Store (Wisconsin-based department store) =

Department store, founded in Milwaukee, Wisconsin

Boston Store Inc.
- Type: Subsidiary
- Industry: Retail
- Founded: 1897; 129 years ago
- Defunct: August 29, 2018
- Fate: Chapter 7 bankruptcy, liquidation
- Number of locations: 14 (2018)
- Products: Clothing, footwear, bedding, furniture, jewelry, beauty products, housewares
- Parent: Federated Department Stores (1948–1985); Bergner's (1985–1993); Carson's (1993-1998); Saks, Inc. (1998–2006); The Bon-Ton (2006–2018); CSC Generation (2018-2021); BrandX (2021–present)
- Website: https://www.bostonstore.com/

Boston Store was an American department store based in Milwaukee, Wisconsin until its bankruptcy in 2018.

== History ==
=== 1920s and 1930s ===
Throughout the 1920s, and 1930s the Boston Store was run by Philip Irving Stone. His nephew, Irving Stone, worked as a manager and, beginning in 1927, dated Broadway ingenue and later MGM movie star Jeanette MacDonald for a time.

In December 1933, 600 of the store's 1000 employees walked out in a famous white collar union strike.

=== Federated and Maus Freres S.A. ===
Julian Simon's control of Boston Store was sold to Federated Department Stores in 1948 and under Federated, branch stores were opened in several Wisconsin cities including Oshkosh, Sheboygan and Manitowoc. Ownership later passed to the Bergner's chain of Peoria, Illinois in 1985 (itself owned by Switzerland-based Maus Frères S.A., a retail conglomerate controlled by the Maus and Nordmann Families); soon afterward Bergner's relocated its headquarters to Milwaukee.

=== Acquisitions ===
As cross-town rival Gimbels was being dismantled in 1986, Boston Store acquired three Gimbel's branches at Southgate Mall, Milwaukee, East Towne Mall, Madison and Mayfair Mall, Wauwatosa.

In 1989, P.A. Bergner bought Chicago's Carson Pirie Scott for over $450 million. Carson's itself had just bought Minneapolis-based Donaldson's in November 1987. With this, Bergner's was a major Midwestern presence, with stores in five states: Wisconsin, Illinois, Minnesota, Indiana, and Iowa, operating under the Bergner's, Carson Pirie Scott and Boston Store names.

=== Bankruptcy and merger with Proffitt's ===
In 1991, Bergner's filed for Chapter 11 bankruptcy, with Maus Freres S.A. losing control of the company in a bitter fight. In 1993, the organization emerged from bankruptcy court under the name Carson Pirie Scott & Co, trading under the symbol CPS. Eventually, Proffitt's Inc., now Saks Incorporated, bought Carson Pirie Scott in 1998 and its purchase increased the northern presence of the Saks Incorporated company.

=== Sale to the Bon-Ton ===
In July 2005, Saks completed the sale of its Southern Department Store Group consisting of Proffitt's and McRae's to Charlotte, North Carolina-based Belk, Inc. On October 31, 2005, Saks announced that it was selling Boston Store and its other Northern Department Store Group stores (Carson Pirie Scott, Bergner's, Younkers, and Herberger's) to Bon-Ton Stores in a $1.1 billion deal. The transaction was completed on March 6, 2006. Younkers stores in the Milwaukee area were rebranded Boston Stores, simplifying the company's ads to feature one Bon-Ton banner per market.

=== Bon-Ton bankruptcy ===
On April 17, 2018, two liquidators, Great American Group and Tiger Capital Group, won an auction for the company, with a bid estimated at $775.5 million (~$951 million in 2024). Stores were closed within 10 to 12 weeks.

=== Relaunch ===
On September 14, 2018 a message was released on the Bostonstore.com homepage stating “We’re Back!”. An agreement had been signed the previous week by CSC Generation Holdings to use the rights to Bon-Ton and its subsidiaries.

On October 1, 2018, Boston Store officially debuted as an online retailer.
