= Brody's =

American fashion retailer

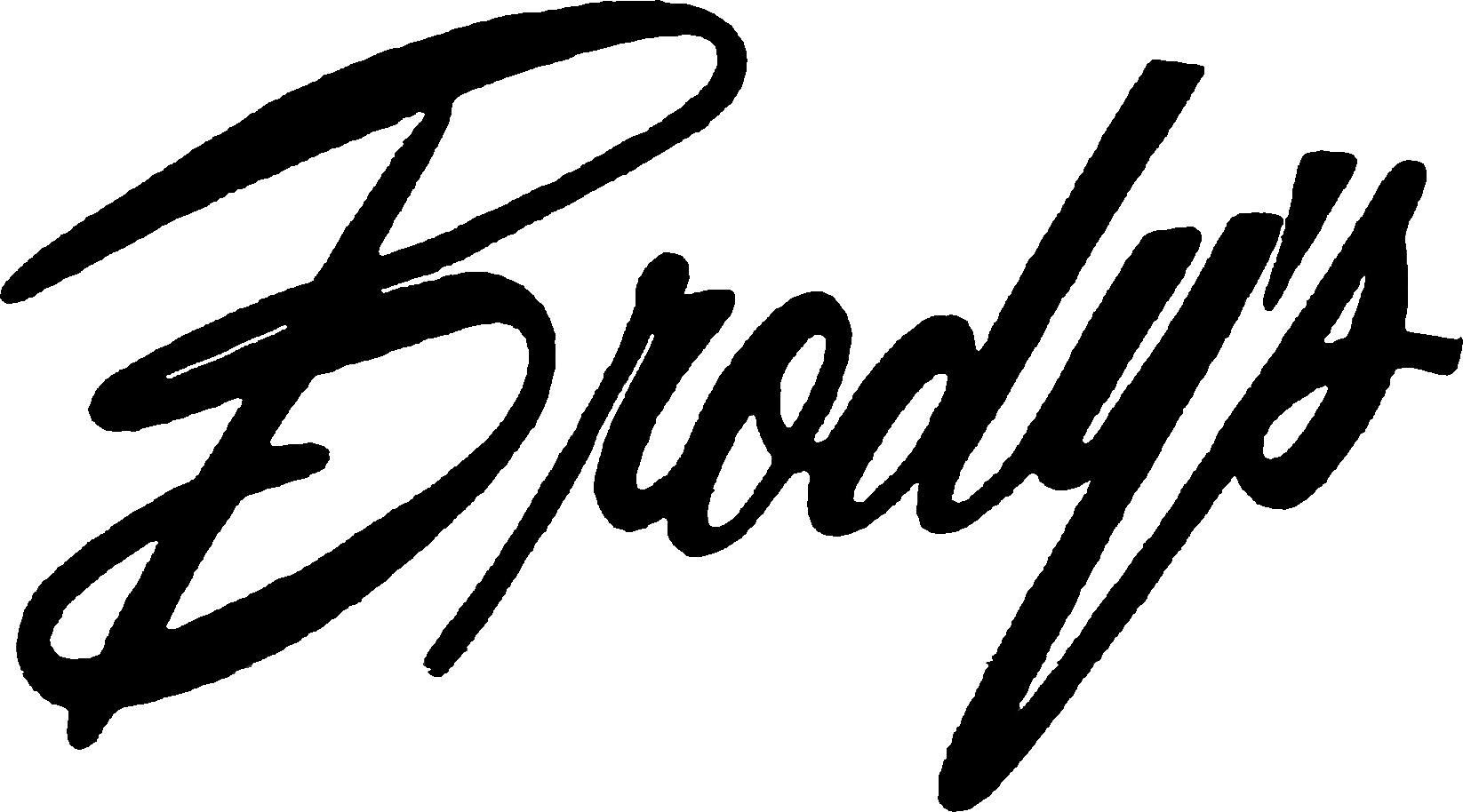
- Industry: Retail
- Founded: Early 1900s
- Defunct: 1998
- Fate: Acquisition by Proffitt's
- Headquarters: Greenville, North Carolina
- Products: Fashion apparel, shoes, accessories, and cosmetics.

Brody Brothers Dry Goods Company, Inc., more commonly referred to as Brody's, was an upscale fashion merchandise chain formerly headquartered in Greenville, North Carolina, with branch stores located in eastern North Carolina. The Brody family remains prominent in eastern North Carolina and the Brody School of Medicine at East Carolina University was named in their honor.

In Kinston, where Brody’s had originated in 1928, the chain operated a store at Vernon Park Mall, which became Proffitt’s after the 1998 acquisition of Brody’s and was later sold to Belk in 2005. The mall was largely vacant except for Belk when it sold in 2021.

== History ==
Brody's was founded by Hyman J. Brody in the early 20th century, with its beginnings as a shoe store in Sumter, South Carolina. In 1928, one of Brody's sons, Leo Brody, relocated to Kinston, North Carolina and founded Brody Brothers Dry Goods. Leo Brody, along with six of his brothers, began to expand the retail business. Upon acquiring Cohen & Sons Clothing in 1973, the family owned chain eventually expanded to six stores in six malls in eastern North Carolina.

At the time of its acquisition by Proffitt's in 1998, Brody's stores were located in The Plaza and Carolina East Mall in Greenville, North Carolina; Golden East Crossing in Rocky Mount, North Carolina; Vernon Park Mall in Kinston, North Carolina; Berkeley Mall in Goldsboro, North Carolina; and Twin Rivers Mall in New Bern, North Carolina. Combined retail space at the time of acquisition stood at 275,000 square feet (25,500 m^{2}). In 2005, Belk acquired the Greenville, Rocky Mount, Kinston, and Goldsboro stores when Saks sold Proffitt's to Belk. Due to Golden East already having a Belk store, that store instead became Bed Bath & Beyond and Ross Dress for Less.
