= Stephen Sadove =

American businessman

Stephen Sadove is an American businessman. He is the former chairman and chief executive officer of Saks Incorporated.

== Biography ==
=== Early life ===
His father worked for the World Bank. He graduated from Hamilton College in 1973, and received an M.B.A. from the Harvard Business School.

=== Career ===
From 1975 to 1991, he worked for General Foods. He was president of Clairol from 1991 to 1995, where he was responsible for Worldwide Clairol's performance in Canada, Europe, the Middle East, Africa and Latin America. He was president of Worldwide Beauty Care from 1995 to 1998, senior vice president of Bristol-Myers Squibb Company and president of Worldwide Beauty Care and Nutritionals from 1998 to September 2000, and senior vice president of Bristol-Myers Squibb and president of Bristol-Myers Squibb Worldwide Beauty Care from 1996 to January 2002. From January 2002 to March 2004, he was vice chairman of Saks. He has been CEO since January 2006 and chairman since May 2007. He serves as chairman of the board of directors and executive committee of the National Retail Federation.

He is on the board of EQ Office. He now sits on the board of directors of Colgate-Palmolive and the restaurant chain Ruby Tuesday. He was chairman of the Harvard Business School Club of Greater New York and sits on the board of trustees of his alma mater, Hamilton College. He has lectured on the MBA program at Columbia Business School.

=== Personal life ===
He has admitted to using playing tennis as a networking tool.
