= Gant (company) =

Swedish clothing brand

- Type: Private
- Industry: Retail
- Founder: Bernard Gantmacher
- Headquarters: Stockholm, Sweden (global)
- Number of locations: 583 (2016)
- Key people: Patrik Söderström (CEO)
- Products: Accessories; Clothing; Footwear; Housewares; Glasses; Watches
- Parent: Maus Frères
- Website: www.gant.com

Gant Inc., stylized as GANT, is a Swedish designer fashion brand with American roots, headquartered in Stockholm. The company was founded in 1949 by Bernard Gantmacher and was originally based in New Haven, Connecticut. Gant operates in 70 markets and its products are available at over 4,000 retailers. The company has three different collections: GANT, GANT Diamond G and GANT Rugger.

== History ==
Bernard Gantmacher arrived in New York City in 1907, a Jewish immigrant of Ukrainian origin from Myropil. Gantmacher was employed at a garment factory sewing shirt collars and met his future wife, Rebecca Rose, a button and buttonhole specialist who worked for the same company. After Gantmacher's return from military service during World War I, the couple married and founded the Par-Ex Shirt Company with business partner Morris Shapiro. The company made shirts for brands including Brooks Brothers, J. Press and Manhattan. In 1927, the company was relocated to New Haven, Connecticut. In April 1949, the Gant label was launched. Following their father's death in 1955, Bernard's sons took over the company's operations.

GANT dress shirts were known for their back-collar button, locker loop and box pleat. In the 1960s, Gant made the Yale co-op shirt exclusively for the store on the Yale University campus. Shirts from Gant and rival Sero were de rigueur for high-school and college-age males who could afford their premium price during the decade. In 1968, the Gant brothers sold the company to Consolidated Foods but remained with the company. In 1971, the company launched its first sportswear line and in 1974 launched its Rugger brand. In 1979, Gant became a subsidiary of apparel manufacturer The Palm Beach Company and ceased operations in New Haven.

In the early 1980s, Gant entered the international market when Pyramid Sportswear of Sweden was given the right to design and market Gant outside the US. Initially, Pyramid only offered the Gant label in Sweden but quickly expanded internationally. In February 1995 the first Gant store opened in Europe in Amsterdam; it is currently the oldest operating Gant store in the world. In 1995, Phillips-Van Heusen acquired the Gant brand in the U.S. from bankrupt sportswear manufacturer, Crystal Brands, Inc. In 1997, Gant opened its first store in the United States. Phillips-Van Heusen sold its Gant operations in 1999 to Pyramid Sportswear of Sweden for $71 million.

In the spring of 2006, Gant became a public company and was listed on the Stockholm Stock Exchange's O-List; it was delisted 20 March 2008 upon being acquired by the Swiss retail group Maus Frères. In November 2010, Gant returned to New Haven, where it opened a retail store.
