= College Square Mall (Tennessee) =

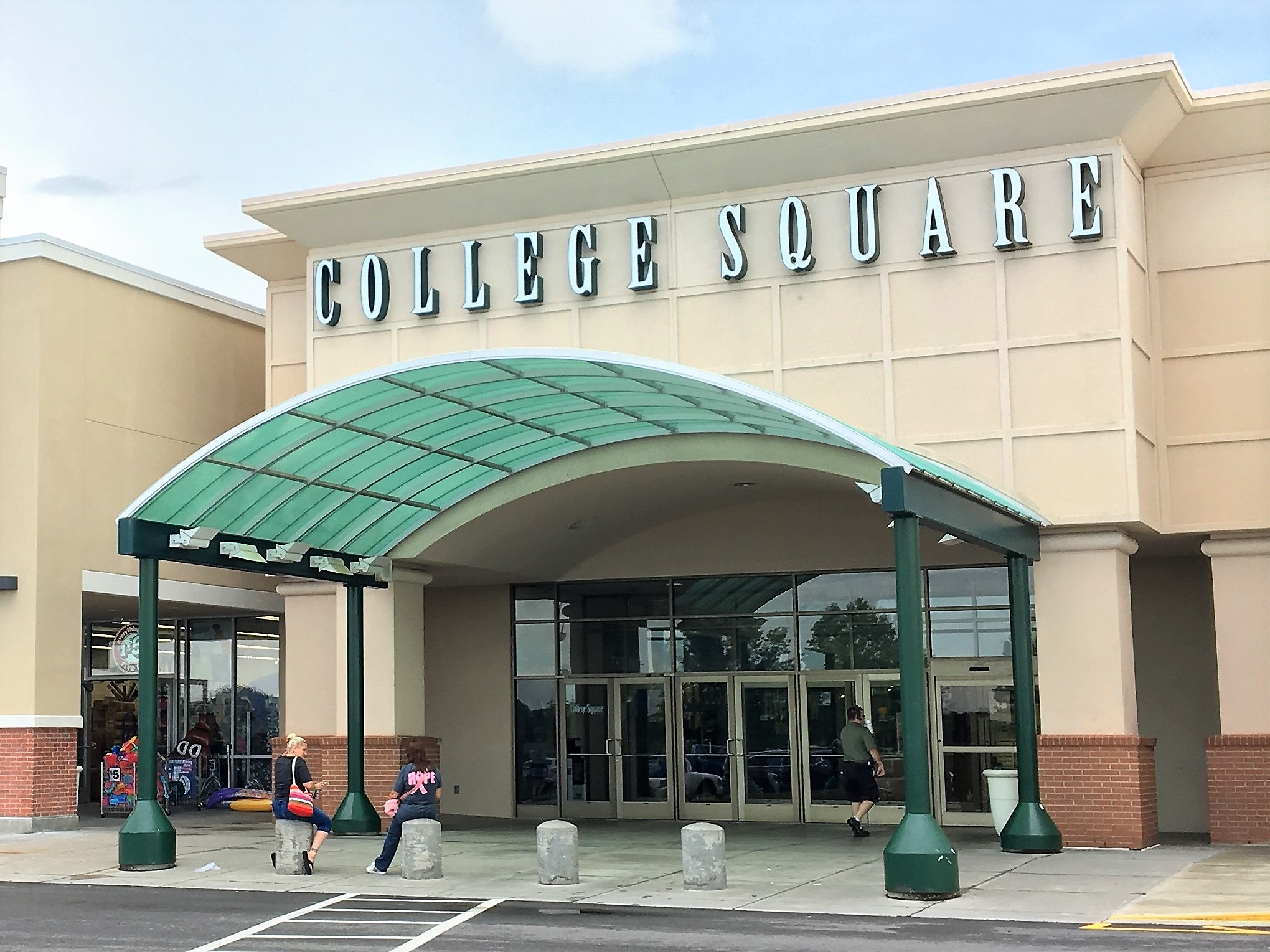
- College Square Mall in 2018
- Location: Morristown, Tennessee, United States
- Coordinates: 36°13′13″N 83°15′39″W
- Address: 2550 E. Morris Blvd
- Opened: 1988 (renovated 1999)
- Developer: CBL & Associates Properties
- Manager: Urban Retail Properties
- Owner: Time Equities, Inc.
- Num. of stores: 50 stores
- Num. of anchor tenants: 5
- Floor area: 459,705 square feet (42,708.0 m^{2}) (GLA)
- Floors: 1
- Website: collegesquaremall.com

College Square is an indoor regional shopping mall located in Morristown, Tennessee. College Square is owned by Time Equities Inc and managed by Urban Retail Properties. It features approximately 50 stores and restaurants including AMC College Square 12.

== History ==
Construction on College Square Mall broke ground on January 5, 1987, with the mall opening in 1988. College Square is the only shopping mall in an eight-county area of East Tennessee. The mall was originally anchored by Maryville-based Proffitt's (a regional department store), Walmart, JCPenney, Sears, and Goody's Family Clothing (a regional discount junior department store).

Walmart has relocated outside the mall, with Belk taking part of its space, including an outside and mall entrance. A regionally based chain of pottery stores, Dixie Pottery, had a location adjacent to Belk. The store, which had no mall entrance, closed in 2007.

The Proffitt's location closed after the chain was bought out by Belk; College Square had been the only mall in the region with locations of both Proffitt's and Belk. In 2007, Kohl's moved into the Proffitt's space after expanding the building into a former parking lot. In 2008, a new twelve-screen Carmike Cinema was built over a large portion of the southern parking lot. The former theater was demolished. In addition, the Goody's Family Clothing store in the mall closed in 2009 with the bankruptcy of the retail chain, and then returned on March 17, 2011, within its former space. Sears closed in 2013. TJ Maxx went into half of the old Sears store along with Longhorn Steakhouse. On January 12, 2016, JCPenney announced it was closing in spring 2016.

Dick's Sporting Goods and ULTA Beauty opened in October 2016 in the former JCPenney location. Planet Fitness opened in the former Dixie Pottery location in March 2017. In May 2017, College Square Mall announced another redevelopment project which will add retailer Five Below to the front of the mall and an Olive Garden restaurant in front of DICK'S Sporting Goods fronting East Morris Boulevard. In 2018, the mall celebrated its 30th anniversary.

In late 2018, Ashley HomeStore moved into where Goody's was previously located. Ashley closed in 2020 and Family Fun Zone opened in its place in late 2020.
