= Block & Kuhl =

Department store chain

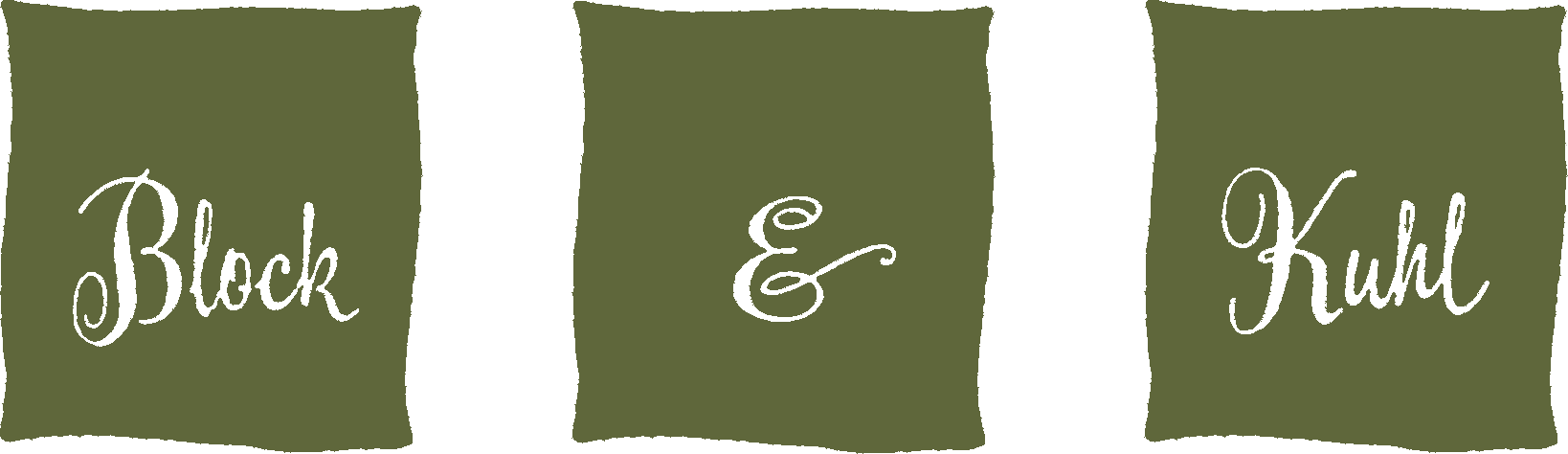
Block & Kuhl Final Logo

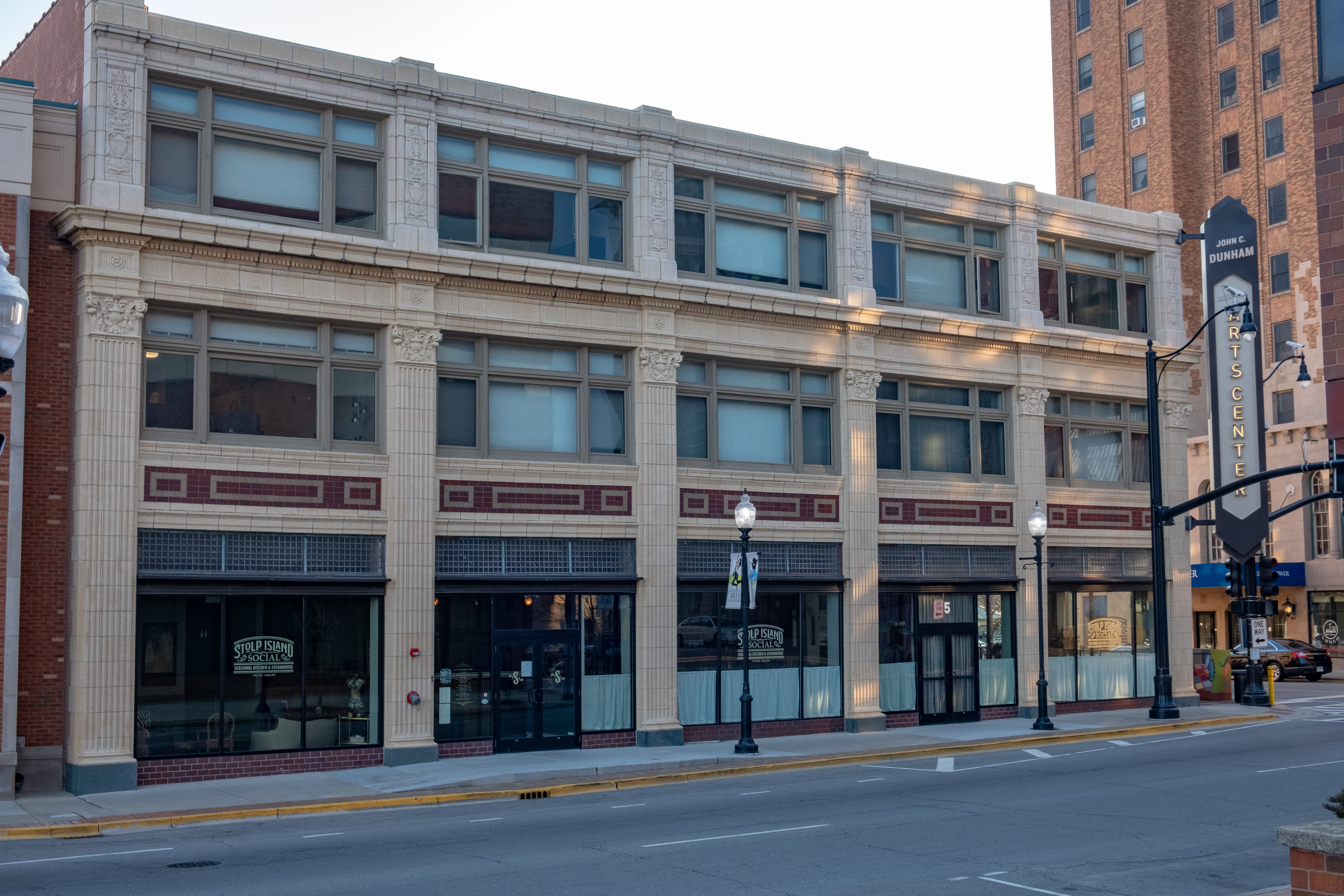
Former Block & Kuhl store in Aurora, Illinois

Block & Kuhl (originally Schipper & Block) was a chain of department stores based in Peoria, Illinois that was bought by Carson Pirie Scott in 1961. Block & Kuhl stores were converted to the Carson Pirie Scott name.

== History ==
Block & Kuhl traced its roots to 1863 or 1864 and the C. Bonk and Co., a dry goods store with John H. Schipper as Bonk's partner. After Bonk's death, Henry C. Block joined the company, thus becoming the Schipper and Block Co., located at 304 Margaret St. in Pekin, Illinois.

In 1874, they moved to 302 Court Street, corner of 3rd. As their business grew, they opened a second shop at Court and Capitol, on Oct. 12, 1879. Years later they opened a store in Peoria which soon after became the largest dry goods emporium in downstate Illinois.

Schipper died in 1893, and Block continued to operate the business until a fire in 1898 that destroyed the Court & Capitol store. A new building was erected in its place. Then around 1900, Block sold a considerable interest to George Ehrlicher, Block's assistant, closed the store at Court & 3rd and consolidated operations into the new Court & Capitol emporium.

In 1905, they opened a store in Peoria, which would later become the company's headquarters and flagship store.

The company's name was changed to Block and Kuhl Co. on Jan. 1, 1914, when Theodore Kuhl became president – but the Schipper & Block Co. sign remained for years. Another fire in February 1922 destroyed the store, which was rebuilt again by December 1922.

In 1929, Block & Kuhl commemorated the 50th anniversary of the Pekin Court & Capitol store by displaying a giant flag across the side of the Peoria store. Listed as the largest U.S. flag in Illinois it saluted President Herbert Hoover's plan to provide relief to the nation's farmers.

George Ehrlicher's sons George Jr. and Arthur took over the business after their father, and they kept the business going until In 1961, Block and Kuhl Co. sold to Carson Pirie Scott and most locations were converted to Carson Pirie Scott stores. In May 1962, when business reverses made it necessary for the Ehrlicher brothers to sell the Pekin store. George Jr. died in Sept. 1962, just four months after the sale.

== Stores ==
In 1959, there were 18 Block and Kuhl stores in downstate Illinois and 2 in Iowa. Locations included:

=== Peoria flagship ===
Peoria, Illinois, headquarters and flagship store

- Built in 1905 for Schipper & Block, the first steel structure in Peoria
- Was first expanded in 1911
- Renamed to Block & Kuhl on Jan. 1, 1914, when Theodore Kuhl became president
- Expanded again in 1916, the latter to accommodate the addition of elevators
- Nicknamed "The Big White Store"
- Closed (as Carson's) in 1975
- Known more recently as the former Chase Bank building
- Sold in 2018 and remodeled to become the headquarters of OSF Healthcare

=== Branch stores ===
- Aurora, Illinois (5 East Galena Boulevard, built 1928, now the Waubonsee Community College Extension Center)
