= Herberger's =

American department store chain

G. R. Herberger Inc.
- Trade name: Herberger's
- Type: Subsidiary
- Industry: Retail
- Founded: 1927; 99 years ago in Osakis, Minnesota
- Founder: G. R. Herberger
- Defunct: August 29, 2018; 8 years ago (original company)
- Fate: Chapter 7 Bankruptcy Liquidation
- Headquarters: St. Cloud, Minnesota, United States
- Number of locations: 44 (2018)
- Products: Clothing, footwear, bedding, furniture, jewelry, beauty products, housewares
- Parent: Proffitt's (1997-1998); Saks, Inc. (1998-2006); The Bon-Ton (2006-2018); CSC Generation (2018-2021); BrandX.com (2021-Present)
- Website: herbergers.com

G. R. Herberger Inc. was a department store chain. It was established in 1927 in the Midwestern United States, and closed in 2018.

== History ==
Herberger's previous logo used until January 2004 before adopting the common hexagonal circle logo of Saks/Northern's sister brands.

Herberger's began in Osakis, Minnesota, when G.R. "Bob" Herberger opened his first store in 1927. Herberger's was incorporated for the purpose of acquiring additional stores and expanding into other communities in 1943. By 1972, it grew to 11 stores in four states, with its headquarters in downtown St. Cloud, Minnesota. G. R. Herberger's, Inc., by then an employee-owned company, merged with Proffitt's Inc. in 1997 in stock deal valued at approximately $160 million (~$290 million in 2024).

As Proffitt's Inc. evolved into Saks Incorporated with the company's acquisition of Saks Fifth Avenue, Herberger's eventually became part of the corporation's Northern Department Store Group, an assortment of store locations initially acquired by Proffitt's Inc. as Carson Pirie Scott & Company. On October 31, 2005, Saks announced that it was selling Herberger's and its other Northern Department Store Group stores (Carson Pirie Scott, Bergner's, Boston Store, and Younkers) to Bon-Ton Stores in a $1.1 billion deal; the transaction was completed on March 6, 2006.

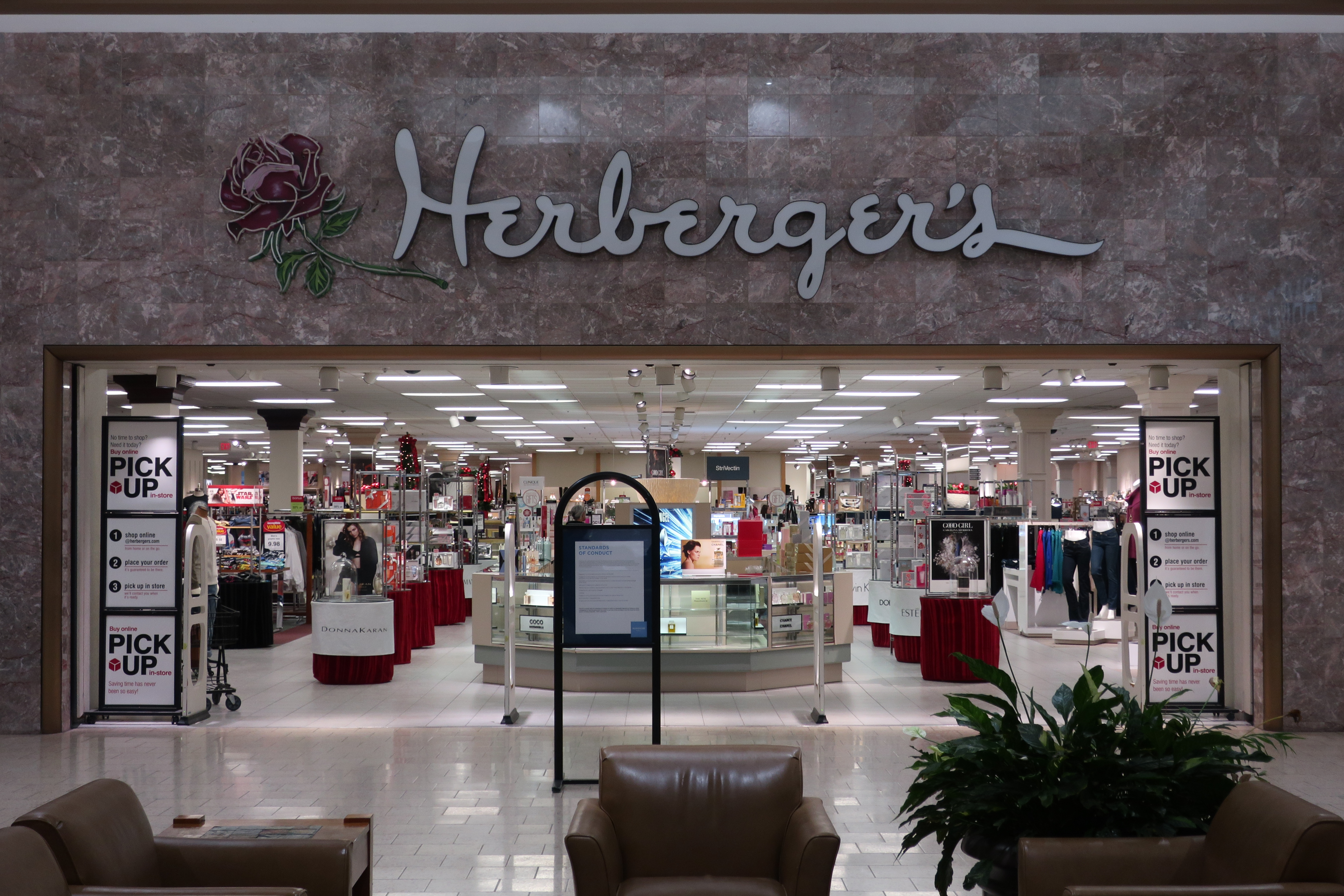
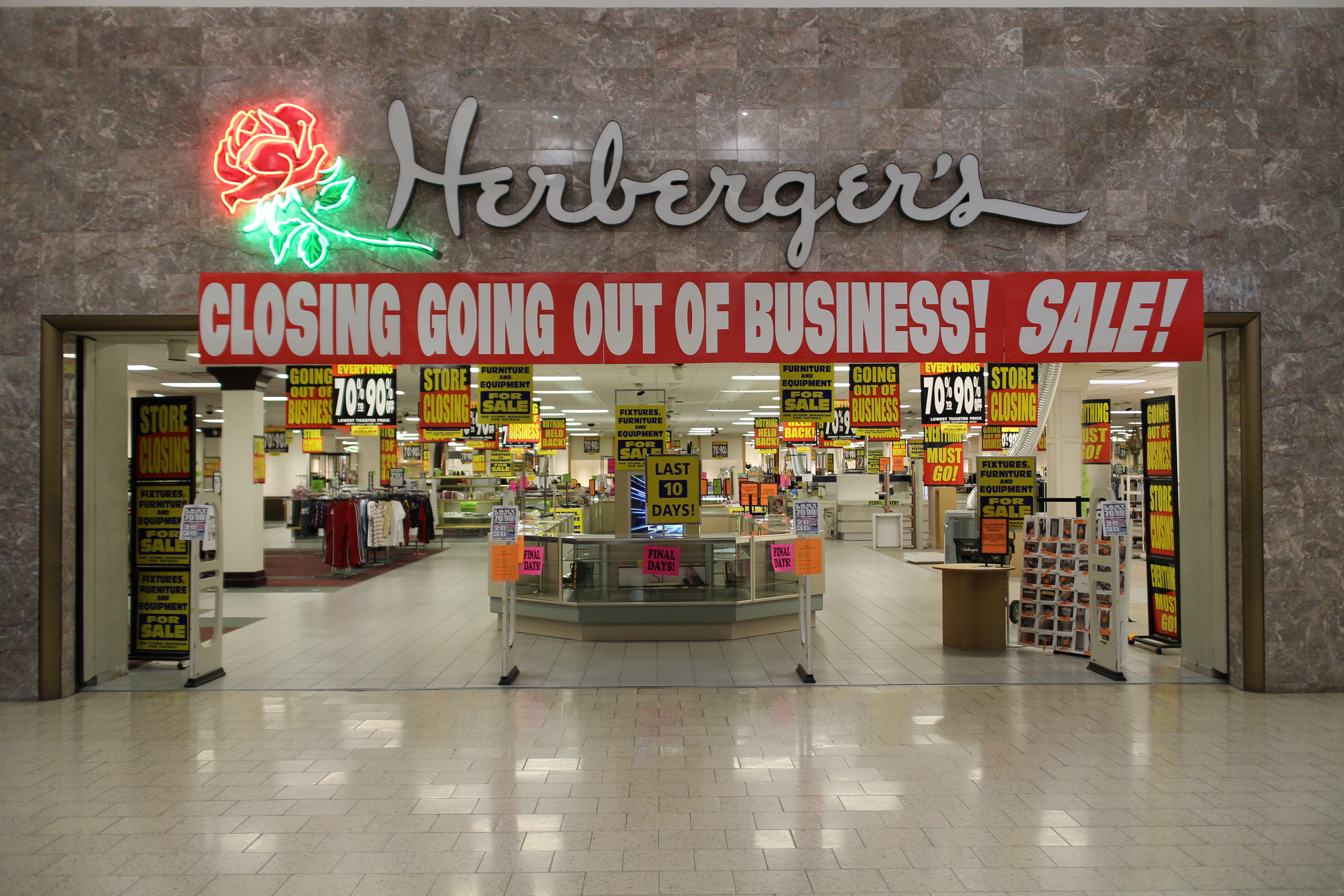
An open Herberger's in Rapid City, South Dakota and its going out of business sale a few months later.

Bon-Ton announced on April 17, 2018, that they would be closing doors and began liquidating all 267 stores after two liquidators, Great American Group and Tiger Capital Group, won an auction for the company. The bid was estimated to be worth $775.5 million. This included all remaining Herberger's locations after 91 years of operation. According to national retail reporter Mitch Nolen, stores were closed within 10 to 12 weeks.

The Fargo Forum reported in 2018 that the Herberger's website had returned online with the text "Herberger's is coming back", coinciding with the last location closing on August 31, 2018. The article did not disclose the financing or ownership of the brand or if the retirement liabilities of former employees remains lost after the transfer of assets.

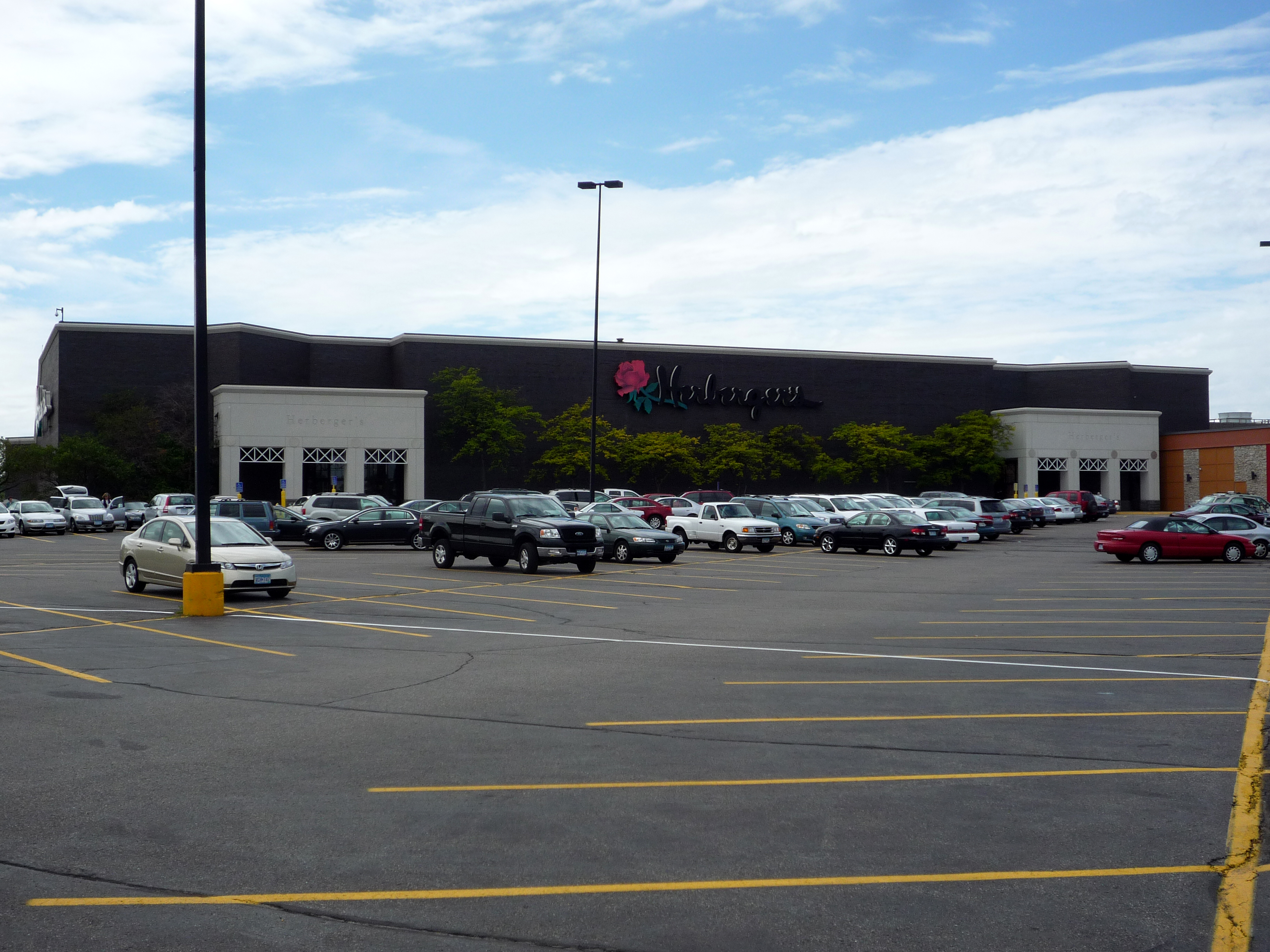
A Herberger's location in Roseville, Minnesota with the old logo.

Herberger's was relaunched when CSC Generations purchased Bon Ton, Inc. and their associated brands and customer lists. On October 1, 2018, it was revealed that multiple Herberger's locations would potentially open or reopen around Minnesota, with the first store likely being in Rochester.

Sometime in 2021, CSC Generations sold Herberger's to BrandX, and indicated that Herberger's would open soon; however, as of 2026 this has yet to materialize.
