= Saks, Inc. =

American holding company

- Formerly: Proffitts, Inc. (1919–1998)
- Type: Public
- Traded as: NYSE:PRFT (1987–1998); NYSE:SKS (1998–2013)
- Industry: Retail
- Genre: Department stores
- Founded: 1998; 28 years ago in Birmingham, Alabama, U.S.
- Defunct: November 4, 2013; 12 years ago
- Fate: Acquired by Hudson's Bay Company
- Successor: Hudson's Bay Company
- Headquarters: New York City, New York, U.S.
- Number of locations: 46 full-line, 69 off-price (2013)
- Area served: United States; Bahrain; Mexico; Saudi Arabia; United Arab Emirates (2013)
- Key people: Stephen Sadove (chairman and CEO); Kevin Wills (CFO)
- Revenue: ▲US$ 3.147 billion (2013)
- Operating income: ▼US$ 138.49 million (2013)
- Net income: ▼US$ 62.88 million (2013)
- Total assets: ▼US$ 2.09 billion (2013)
- Total equity: ▼US$ 1.149 billion (2013)
- Number of employees: 12,900 (2011)
- Subsidiaries: Saks Fifth Avenue; Saks Fifth Avenue Off 5th
- Website: Official website at the Wayback Machine (archived December 8, 2013)

Saks, Inc. was an American holding company founded in 1998 through the merger of Proffitts, Inc. and Saks Fifth Avenue. Before its acquisition by the Canadian-founded Hudson's Bay Company (HBC) in 2013, it owned numerous regional department store chains, including Carson's, McRae's, Parisian, and Proffitt's, as well as the New York City-based Saks Fifth Avenue. Although, the company acquired several mid-range and specialty department store chains in the 1990s, it refocused on upscale retailing and divested them in the mid-2000s.

HBC maintains the Saks Fifth Avenue nameplate through the full-line department stores, Saks Off 5th off-price stores, and SaksWorks coworking space provider.

== Operations during 20th century ==
Saks, Inc. began as a chain of five Proffitt's stores in the Knoxville, Tennessee, metropolitan area. In 1987, Proffitt's Inc. became a publicly traded company on the NASDAQ stock exchange under the symbol PRFT. Following its initial public offering, the company grew by acquiring several department store chains. It purchased 18 Hess's locations in Tennessee, Virginia, Kentucky, and Georgia in 1989. From 1993 to 1998, the company acquired McRae's, Younkers, Parisian, Herberger's, Carson Pirie Scott, Bergner's, and the Wisconsin-based Boston Store chain. It also bought additional locations from Loveman's, Parks-Belk, and Brody's, converting them into its existing store brands.

After acquiring Parisian, Proffitt's relocated its corporate headquarters from Knoxville to Birmingham, Alabama, in October 1997. Although Saks no longer operates a retail store in Mississippi, the company still runs its data services from the former McRae's headquarters in Jackson, Mississippi.

=== 1998 acquisition of Saks Holdings ===
In September 1998, the company acquired Saks Holdings, Inc., and subsequently changed its legal name to Saks, Incorporated. The acquisition included the Saks Fifth Avenue and Off 5th franchises, the Folio mail-order business, and the e-commerce site Saks.com.

Following the acquisition, the Saks Fifth Avenue properties formed the Saks Fifth Avenue Enterprises division, while the Birmingham-based department store division became the Saks Department Store Group. This main-line department store group was organized into three segments: the Southern Department Store Group, which included McRae's and Proffitt's; the Northern Department Store Group, which included Bergner's, Boston Store, Carson Pirie Scott, Herberger's, and Younkers; and the company's Specialty Department Store Group, Parisian.

== Operations during 21st century ==
In 2001, the company recorded annual revenues of $6.6 billion, placing it on the Fortune 500 list as one of the largest department store operators in the United States. The company was also a primary sponsor of the Bruno's Memorial Classic golf tournament, later known as the Regions Charity Classic. In 2007, the company moved its headquarters to Midtown Manhattan.

In 2005, vendors filed complaints against Saks alleging unlawful chargebacks. Following a multi-year investigation, the U.S. Securities and Exchange Commission (SEC) exposed illicit tactics that allowed Saks to withhold money owed to clothing manufacturers. These actions inflated Saks' annual earnings by up to 43% and resulted in the improper collection of approximately $30 million from suppliers over seven years. Saks settled with the SEC in 2007 after terminating at least three executives involved in the fraudulent activities. In March 2005, Saks announced it would restate its financial results from fiscal 1999 through the third quarter of fiscal 2004 to correct accounting errors related to its operating leases.

By 2005, Saks Incorporated shifted its focus toward the luxury retail market associated with its Saks Fifth Avenue stores. This led to the July 2005 sale of its 47 Proffitt's and McRae's stores to Belk for approximately $622 million.

On October 31 of that same year, Saks announced the sale of the 142 stores within its Northern Department Store Group, including Carson Pirie Scott, Bergner's, Younkers, Herberger's, and Boston Store, to Bon-Ton Stores, Inc. for $1.1 billion. The transaction was completed on March 6, 2006.

On August 2, 2006, Saks Incorporated agreed to sell its 38 Parisian stores, two regional distribution centers, and its Birmingham corporate headquarters to Belk. Belk rebranded the locations under its own name in the third quarter of 2007.

On November 5, 2008, Saks announced the closure of the unprofitable Club Libby Lu chain.

=== 2013 acquisition by Hudson's Bay Company ===
On July 29, 2013, the Toronto-based Hudson's Bay Company announced its acquisition of Saks, Inc. for $2.4 billion. Through this transaction, Saks Fifth Avenue and Saks Fifth Avenue Off 5th became affiliated with Hudson's Bay, Home Outfitters, and Lord & Taylor.

== List of department stores ==
Name	Year founded	Year acquired	Year divested	Notes
Bergner's	1889	1996	2006	Sold to Bon-Ton
Boston Store	1897	1998	2006	Sold to Bon-Ton
Carson Pirie Scott	1854	1998	2006	Sold to Bon-Ton
Club Libby Lu	2000	—N/a	2009	Brand dissolved by Saks, Inc.
Herberger's	1927	1997	2006	Sold to Bon-Ton
McRae's	1902	1993	2005	Sold to Belk
Parisian	1877	1995	2006	Sold to Belk
Proffitt's	1919	—N/a	2005	Sold to Belk
Saks Fifth Avenue	1867	1998	—N/a	Acquired by Hudson's Bay Company in 2013
Saks Fifth Avenue Off 5th	1990	1998	—N/a	Acquired by Hudson's Bay Company in 2013
Younkers	1856	1996	2006	Sold to Bon-Ton
