= Northwoods Mall (Illinois) =

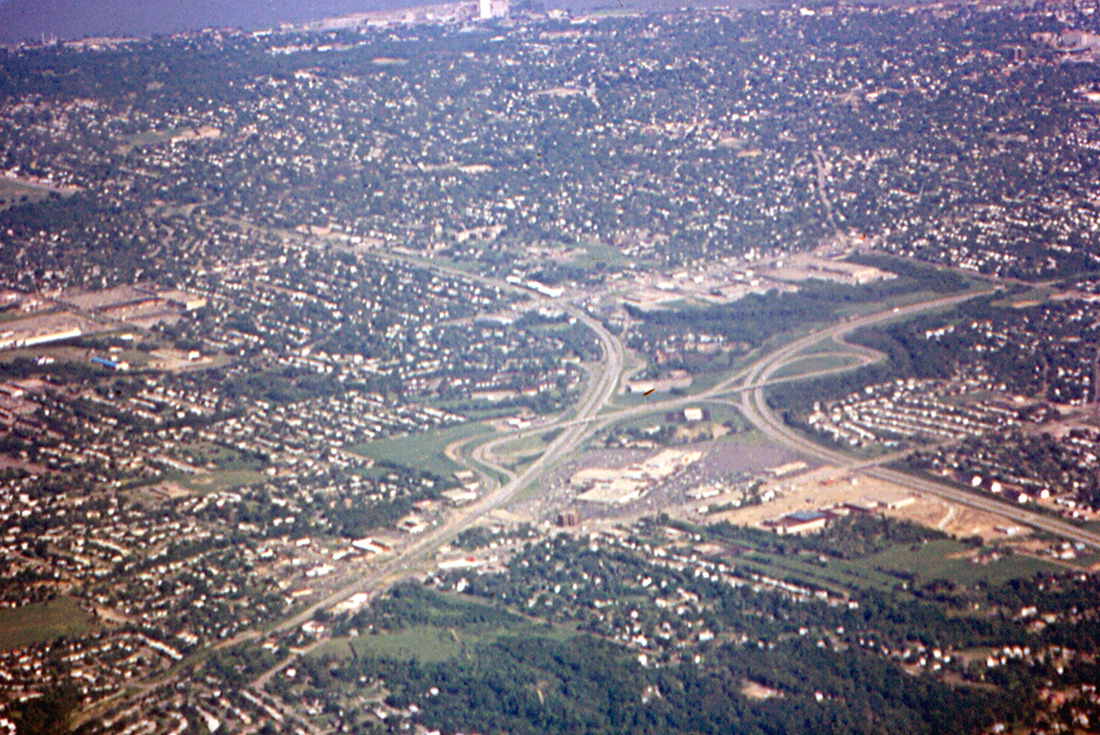
- Northwoods and adjacent I-74/U.S. 150 interchange, 1974
- Location: Peoria, Illinois, United States
- Coordinates: 40°44′27″N 89°37′45″W
- Address: 2200 W. War Memorial Dr. (formerly 4501 N. War Memorial Dr.)
- Opened: 1973
- Developer: Harold Carlson
- Owner: Kohan Retail Investment Group; Summit Properties USA
- Num. of stores: 90
- Num. of anchor tenants: 3
- Floor area: 694,000 sq ft (64,500 m^{2})
- Floors: 2
- Parking: 3,009 spaces
- Public transit: Greater Peoria Mass Transit District
- Website: Official website

Northwoods Mall is a shopping mall in Peoria, Illinois. The mall opened in 1973. It is situated at the corner of Scenic Drive and U.S. Route 150 (West War Memorial Drive). The anchor stores are JCPenney, Tilt Studio, and Discount Tire.

== History ==
Northwoods Mall opened in 1973 and was designed by architects Sidney H. Morris & Associates of Chicago, with Harold Carson Associates as the manager. The original anchor stores upon opening were Montgomery Ward, Carson Pirie Scott (shortened later to Carson's), and JCPenney. Original tenants included Helzberg Diamonds, B. Dalton, Claire's, GNC, a Fannie May candy shop, a bank, Brown's Sporting Goods, and several restaurants.

The mall was sold to Simon Property Group in 1983. Carson's closed that same year and was replaced two years later by Famous-Barr. Also in 1983, a botulism outbreak at the mall's Skewer Inn restaurant affected 28 customers.

Montgomery Ward closed its store in the mall in 1997, and Sears occupied its space a year later. A 2005 renovation added a food court. The Famous-Barr store was re-branded as Macy's in 2006. On January 7, 2016, it was announced that Macy's would close in March 2016 as part of a plan to close 40 stores nationwide. In 2017, Round 1 Entertainment moved into part of the vacant Macy's store on the 1st floor which opened on November 18, 2017. In 2018, it was announced that The RoomPlace would move into the rest of the half vacant Macy's store on the 2nd floor which opened on May 11, 2018.

On November 7, 2019, it was announced that Sears would close in February 2020 as part of a plan to close 96 stores nationwide. After Sears closed, JCPenney and The RoomPlace became the only anchor tenants left. Sears closed on February 16, 2020. In 2020, Spirit Halloween served as a temporary anchor store in the former Sears. On March 22, 2023, it was announced that Round1 would be closing in May 2023. In February 2024, it was announced that The RoomPlace would close as part of a plan to close 8 stores nationwide. After The RoomPlace closed, Tilt Studio announced that they were looking to open a Tilted 10 Arcade inside the former The RoomPlace and Round1 anchor space. Tilt Studio opened their Tilted 10 Arcade in 2024.

In late 2024, a Discount Tire auto store opened in the former Sears building inside what was the former Sears Auto Center.
