= Bergner's =

American department store chain

P.A. Bergner & Co.
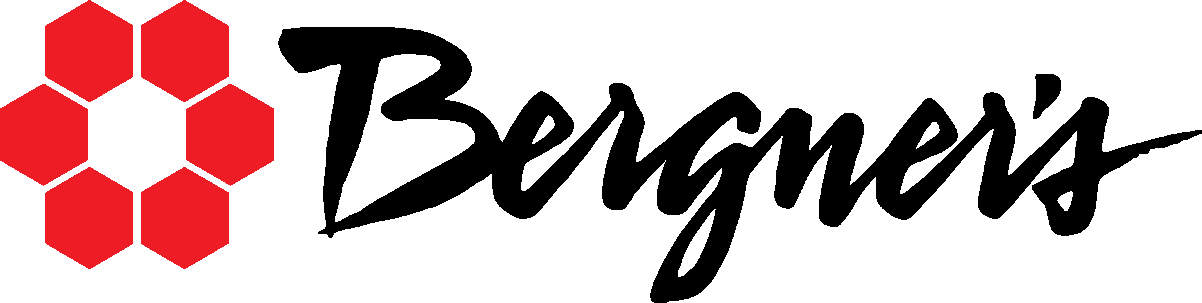
- Trade name: Bergner's
- Type: Subsidiary
- Industry: Retail
- Founded: 1889 (137 years ago) in Peoria, Illinois, US
- Founder: Peter Alan Bergner
- Defunct: 2018 (8 years ago) (original company)
- Fate: Bankruptcy (2018); e-commerce (2021 onwards)
- Headquarters: Peoria, Illinois, US
- Number of locations: 272 (2011)
- Products: Clothing, footwear, bedding, furniture, jewelry, beauty products, housewares
- Parent: Maus Frères (1938–1991); Proffitts Inc. (1998–2005); The Bon-Ton (2005–2018); CSC Generation (2018-2021); BrandX.com (2021-Present)
- Website: bergners.com

P.A. Bergner & Co. (also known as Bergner's) was an upscale department store in the Midwestern United States, that was established in 1889. The chain is now an online retailer operated by BrandX.com, Inc. The flagship store was located in Peoria, Illinois at Sheridan Village.

== History ==
=== Beginnings ===
Bergner's was founded in downtown Peoria in 1889 by Peter Alan Bergner. The famous red stone building housed six floors that included a tea room, a millinery, a cobbler, and its famous Fine China department. The store stood on the corner of Adams at Fulton streets across from the then-rival, Block & Kuhl Company.

=== Expansion ===
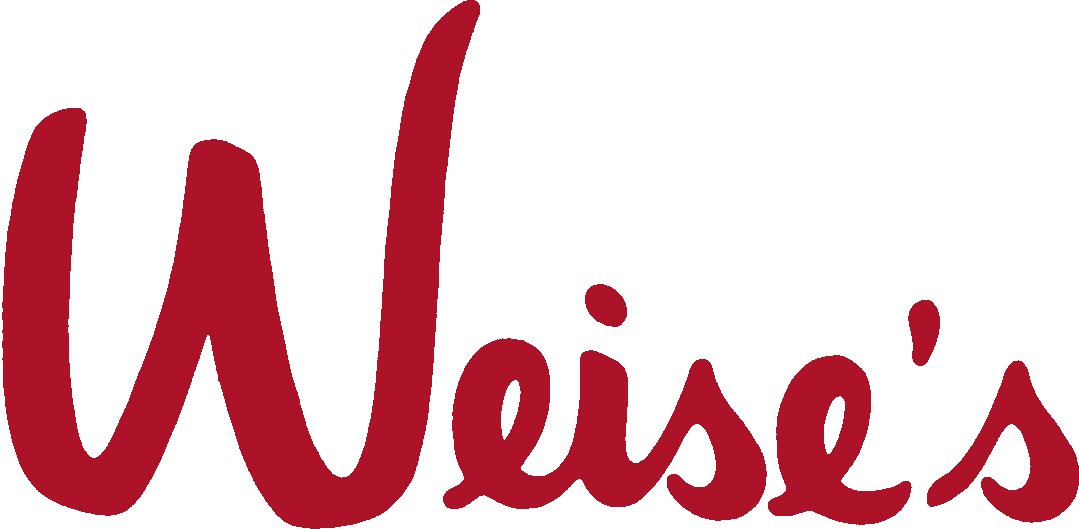
Some stores were branded as Weise's. The Weise's flagship location was in Rockford, IL

In 1957, a second Peoria Bergner's location opened at the then-suburban Sheridan Village Shopping Center. Between 1961 and 1973, the Sheridan Village location sold the most merchandise per square foot of any department store in the United States. This Bergner's was the largest department store in Illinois outside of the Chicago area. During the 1970s, the chain opened several additional locations in Pekin, Bloomington, Decatur, Champaign, Galesburg, Quincy and Peru. During the 1970s, Bergner's opened a budget store (formatted after the original bargain basement downtown store) in the Madison Park Shopping Center in Peoria. Not expanding on this concept, the Madison Park Store was closed in 1993.

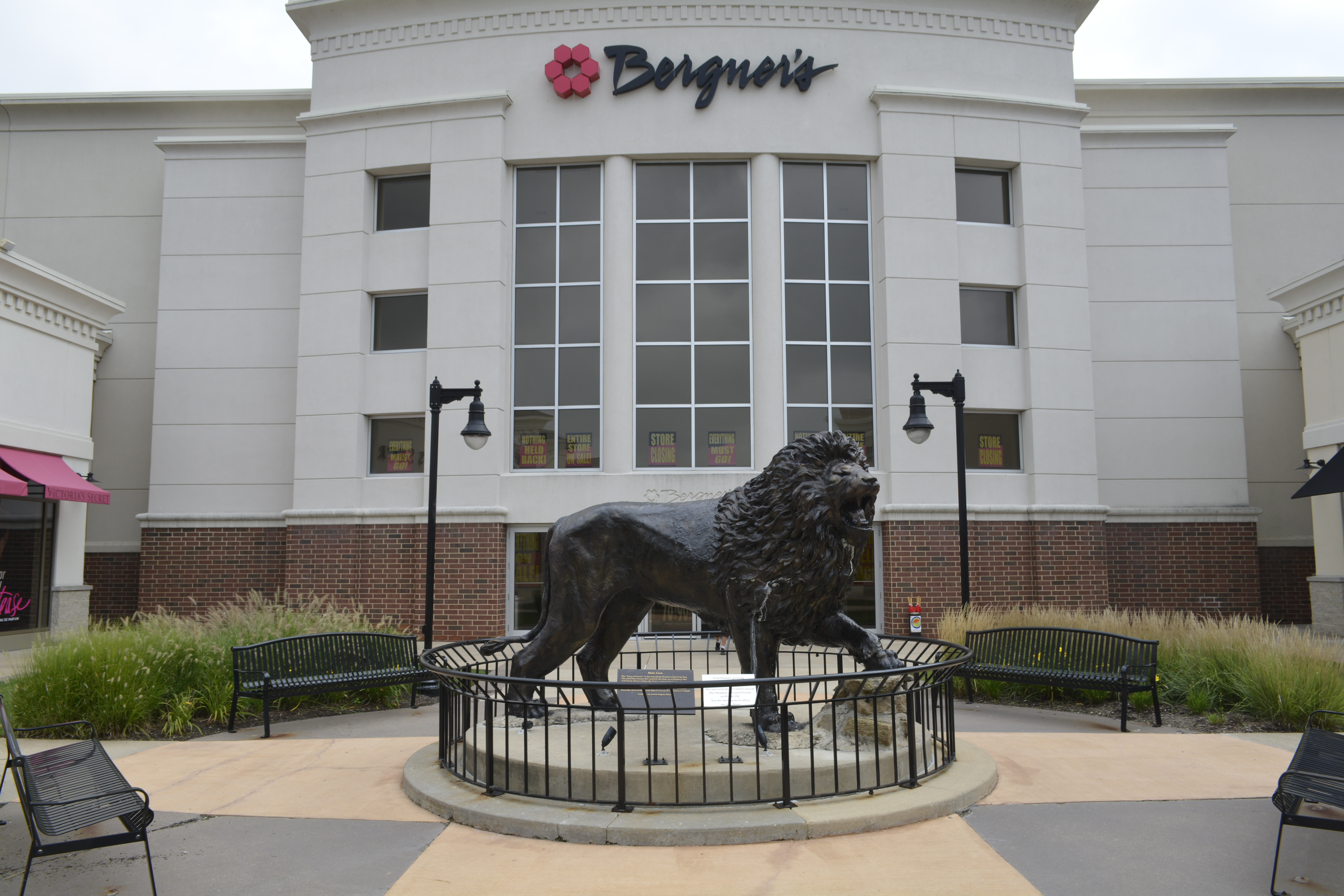
Bergner's at Grand Prairie.

In April 2003, after the four-year process of "The Shoppes at Grand Prairie" lifestyle center development, Bergner's opened a new location serving as their flagship and it was the largest department store south of Chicago and north of St. Louis.

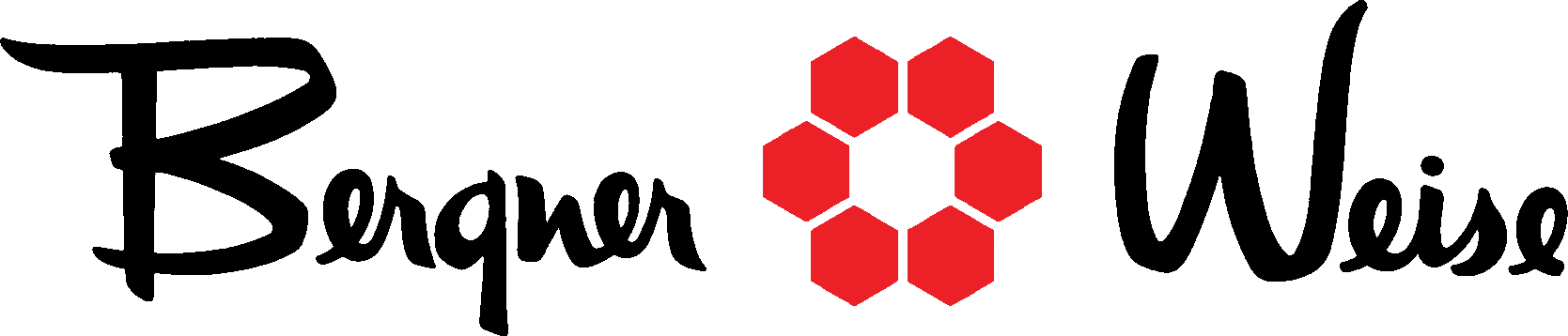
Other stores were branded as Bergner-Weise until being rebranded simply as Bergner's when they phased out the Weise branding.

=== Mergers and acquisitions ===
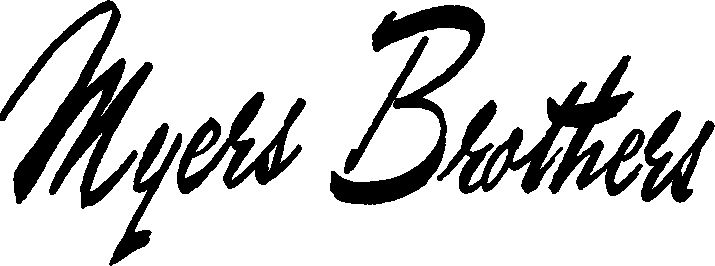
Myers Brothers was a chain Bergner's acquired in 1978.

Bergner's grew robustly in the late 1970s and 1980s. It acquired the eight stores of Myers Brothers Company of Springfield, Illinois, in 1978. In 1985, Bergner's acquired Boston Store and all of its department stores in Wisconsin along with three Gimbel's locations. In 1989, P.A. Bergner bought Chicago's Carson Pirie Scott for over $450 million. Carson's itself had just bought Minneapolis-based Donaldson's in November 1987. With this, Bergner's was a major Midwestern presence, with stores in five states: Wisconsin, Illinois, Minnesota, Indiana, and Iowa, operating under the Bergner's, Carson Pirie Scott, and Boston Store names.

=== Later years ===
P.A. Bergner owned the store until he died in 1926. His son John Velde Bergner was president of the company until his suicide in 1938.

Maus Frères SA, based in Geneva, Switzerland, acquired the company after the younger Bergner's death and gave the store its unique red logo of six hexagons, an emblem Bergner's now shares with five corporate siblings as well as two current Maus subsidiaries.

The downtown Peoria store remained open until 1986 and was demolished in 2000. One Technology Plaza now occupies the site. In memory of the long history of Bergner's to that location, the cornerstone of the red rock building is still on display outside the entrance to the college.

=== Bankruptcy and acquisition by Proffitt's ===
In August 1991, Bergner's filed for bankruptcy. It exited Chapter 11 in 1993 with the new name Carson Pirie Scott & Co. and became a publicly traded company.

Proffitt's Inc., now Saks Incorporated, bought the company in 1998 and named the purchased group of stores the Northern Department Store group internally; its purchase increased the northern presence of the Saks company.

=== Sale to The Bon-Ton ===
In July 2005, Saks completed the sale of its Southern Department Store Group consisting of Proffitt's and McRae's to Charlotte, North Carolina–based Belk, Inc. On October 31, 2005, Saks announced that it was selling Bergner's and its other Northern Department Store Group stores (Carson Pirie Scott, Younkers, Boston Store, and Herberger's) to Bon-Ton Stores in a $1.1 billion deal. The transaction was completed on March 6, 2006. As of 2006, the Bergner's name was used at 14 locations, all in Illinois.

Bon-Ton Stores announced on April 17, 2018, that they would cease operations and began liquidating all 267 stores after two liquidators, Great American Group and Tiger Capital Group, won an auction for the company. The bid was estimated to be worth $775.5 million. This included all remaining Bergner's stores after 128 years of operation. According to national retail reporter Mitch Nolen, stores closed within 10 to 12 weeks.

On September 10, 2018, of Merrillville, Indiana–based CSG Generation acquired all trademark and intellectual property assets of The Bon-Ton (York, Pa.). Subsequently, in early 2021, CSC Generation sold all the acquired assets of Bon-Ton to New York-based BrandX.com, Inc in a private sale.

== See also ==
- Carson Pirie Scott – more information about corporate activity
