= Proffitt's =

American department store chain

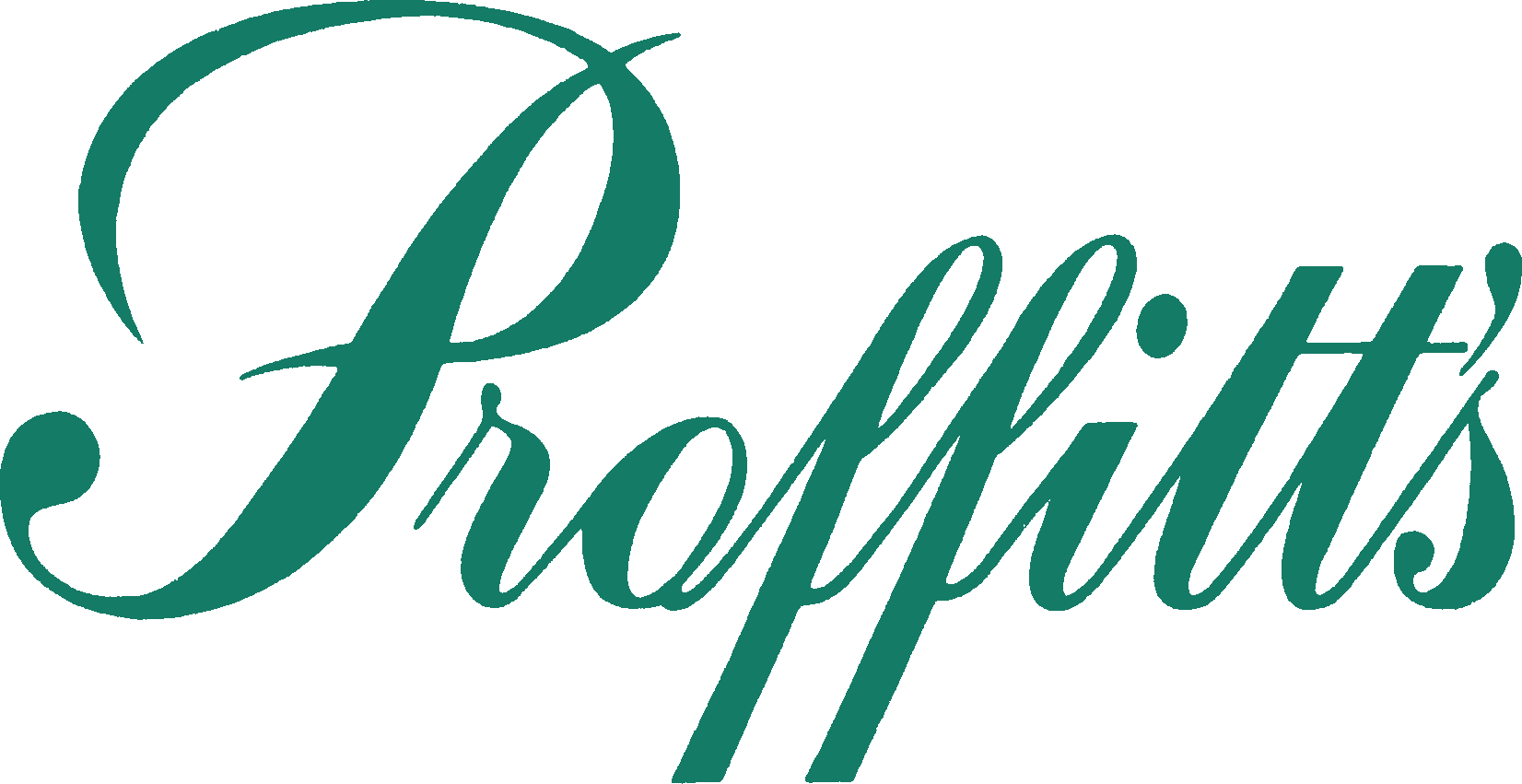
- Type: Subsidiary
- Industry: Retail
- Founded: 1919
- Defunct: March 8, 2006
- Fate: Converted into Belk
- Headquarters: Alcoa, Tennessee
- Products: Clothing, footwear, bedding, furniture, jewelry, beauty products, housewares
- Parent: Saks, Inc. (1998-2005) Belk (2005-2006)
- Subsidiaries: McRae's (1993-1998); Parisian (1995-1998); Younkers (1996-1998); Herberger's (1997-1998)
- Website: Archived official website at the Wayback Machine (archive index)

Proffitt's was a department store chain based in Alcoa, Tennessee. The chain was founded in 1919 by David W. Proffitt and James Ellis. In 2006, the Proffitt's and McRae's stores were converted into Belk after Belk had acquired the two chains in July 2005 from Saks, Inc. At the time of their demise they operated 47 Proffitts & McRae's stores.

== History ==
=== Beginnings ===
Jeweler David W. Proffitt and James Ellis founded the Ellis-Proffitt Co. on Main Street in downtown Maryville, Tennessee, in 1919. The first store had seven departments: ladies ready-to-wear, ladies accessories, millinery, men's shoes, dry goods, and bargain basement. Ellis sold his share of the company to Proffitt in 1921 due to illness. The company expanded by opening its second store in Athens, Tennessee, in 1936. In the 1960s, the Maryville store moved from downtown to Midland Plaza in Alcoa.

In 1982 the store relocated again to Foothills Mall in Maryville, eventually expanding to occupy two stores in the mall, following the departure of Hess's from the market. Both stores remained throughout the Belk acquisition, one for Women and the other for Men, Kids, and Home. A warehouse and distribution center opened in Maryville in 1970. A location in Knoxville opened in 1972 in West Town Mall with an Oak Ridge store following in 1974. A second Knoxville store was added in 1984 at East Towne Mall (now Knoxville Center). In 1984, the company had four stores and annual sales of $40 million (~$102 million in 2024).

For the first 65 years of its existence, the company was a family-owned business, but in 1984 it was acquired by RBM Acquisition Co., led by R. Brad Martin.

=== Going public ===
Proffitt's Inc. went public on July 3, 1987, on the NASDAQ market under the symbol PRFT. Proffitt's purchased the Chattanooga based Loveman's Department Store in 1986, adding four Chattanooga stores and one in Dalton, Georgia, its first location outside of Tennessee.

In 1989, a new 80,000 square feet (7,000 m^{2}) store opened in Biltmore Square Mall in Asheville, North Carolina, bringing the total stores to eleven. The years 1992 and 1993 saw a number of acquisitions, making Proffitt's one of the fastest growing retailers in the US. During that time, the company purchased 18 Hess's locations in Tennessee, Virginia, Kentucky, and Georgia. Some of these locations were formerly Miller's of Tennessee stores. This added new stores in Rome, Georgia; Elizabethtown and Ashland, Kentucky; Bristol, Virginia; and Kingsport and Johnson City, Tennessee. In fall 1992, shortly before the Hess's purchase was completed, a new Proffitt's store opened in The Mall at Johnson City in the company's entry into the Tri-Cities market. The Hess's purchase led to a dual-store format in the mall, similar to the one in the Foothills Mall in Maryville. In Johnson City, once the Hess's store was vacated and renovated, the Men's and Home Stores were moved to that building, leaving Women's and Children's in the newly constructed Proffitt's building. The West Town Mall location in Knoxville was expanded to 122,000 square feet (11,300 m^{2}) in 1995 making it the largest store in the chain.

=== Acquisitions of McRae's and Parks-Belk ===
Proffitt's purchased the Jackson, Mississippi–based McRae's chain in 1993. The McRae's stores, unlike the previous acquisitions, continued to operate separately and under their nameplate. In 1994, Proffitt's purchased Parks-Belk, an independently owned affiliate of Charlotte, North Carolina–based Belk, Inc. This purchase gave Proffitt's a presence for the first time in Greeneville, Tennessee, and gave the company an additional store in each mall in Kingsport and Johnson City. A Parks-Belk location in Morristown, Tennessee was part of the deal, but the store was closed instead of being converted to a Proffitt's. The Johnson City Proffitt's was already operating under the dual-location concept and this gave the company three stores in the same mall. The former Hess's store (now home to Forever 21, formerly Goody's Family Clothing) which housed the Men's and Home Store was vacated and relocated to the former Belk site along with the Children's department. This move created the largest Proffitt's Men's Store in the company and allowed the Women's department its own store. The former Hess store in the Fort Henry Mall in Kingsport was transformed into the largest Proffitt's Home Store, with all other departments remaining in the former Parks-Belk location. Proffitt's would later open stores in Spartanburg, South Carolina, Morgantown and Parkersburg, West Virginia, and they would eventually build a new store at College Square Mall in Morristown, Tennessee.

=== Acquisitions of the Parisian, Younkers, Herberger's, and Carson Pirie Scott chains, and stores from Dillard's ===
Birmingham, Alabama–based Parisian and Younkers of Des Moines, Iowa, were both acquired in 1996 and retained their names and operating units. Herberger's was purchased in 1997 and kept its nameplate. In the same year the company moved from the NASDAQ to the New York Stock Exchange and began trading under the PFT symbol. The company purchased the Carson Pirie Scott chain in 1998 which also consisted of Boston Store and Bergner's and they continued to operate those stores under their respective names. Later in 1998, the company purchased North Carolina–based Brody's and those stores were converted to the Proffitt's name. 1998 also saw Proffitt's acquire a group of 15 stores from Dillard's after its buyout of Mercantile Stores. Five former Castner Knott store in Nashville, Tennessee were renamed Proffitt's, but sold in 2001 to May Department Stores (operated as Hecht's until 2006, now Macy's) after proving marginally profitable under Proffitt's management. The former Brody's stores were sold to Belk in 2004. Also, in 2004, Proffitt's opened a store in Alabama at the Riverchase Galleria in the Birmingham suburb of Hoover in the location vacated by Macy's which now houses a Von Maur store. The Carson Pirie Scott, Bergner's, Boston Store, Herberger's, and Younkers names were eventually sold to Bon-Ton Stores on March 6, 2006.

=== Merger with Saks Fifth Avenue ===
Late 1998 would see the biggest name change when Proffitt's purchased Saks Holdings Inc, the holding company for luxury retailer Saks Fifth Avenue. Upon closing of the acquisition the company name changed to Saks, Inc. and its NYSE ticker symbol changed to SKS.

=== Sale to Belk ===
The McRae's operations would ultimately be consolidated into the Proffitt's division's Alcoa, Tennessee–based offices. They would however, continue to operate under the McRae's name. The year 2005 would signal the end of the Proffitt's and McRae's names with the purchase of those stores by Belk. On March 8, 2006, all McRae's and Proffitt's stores were converted into Belk stores. The conversion ended two of the most well-known retailing names in the southern United States. The only exceptions were two Alabama McRae's stores in Tuscaloosa and Gadsden, which were retained to convert into Parisian locations. On October 2, 2006, the Parisian unit was sold to Belk and these two locations were rebranded as Belk stores almost a year after the purchase.
