= Carson's =

American department store chain (1854–2018)

Carson Pirie Scott & Co.
- Logo used from 1991-2018

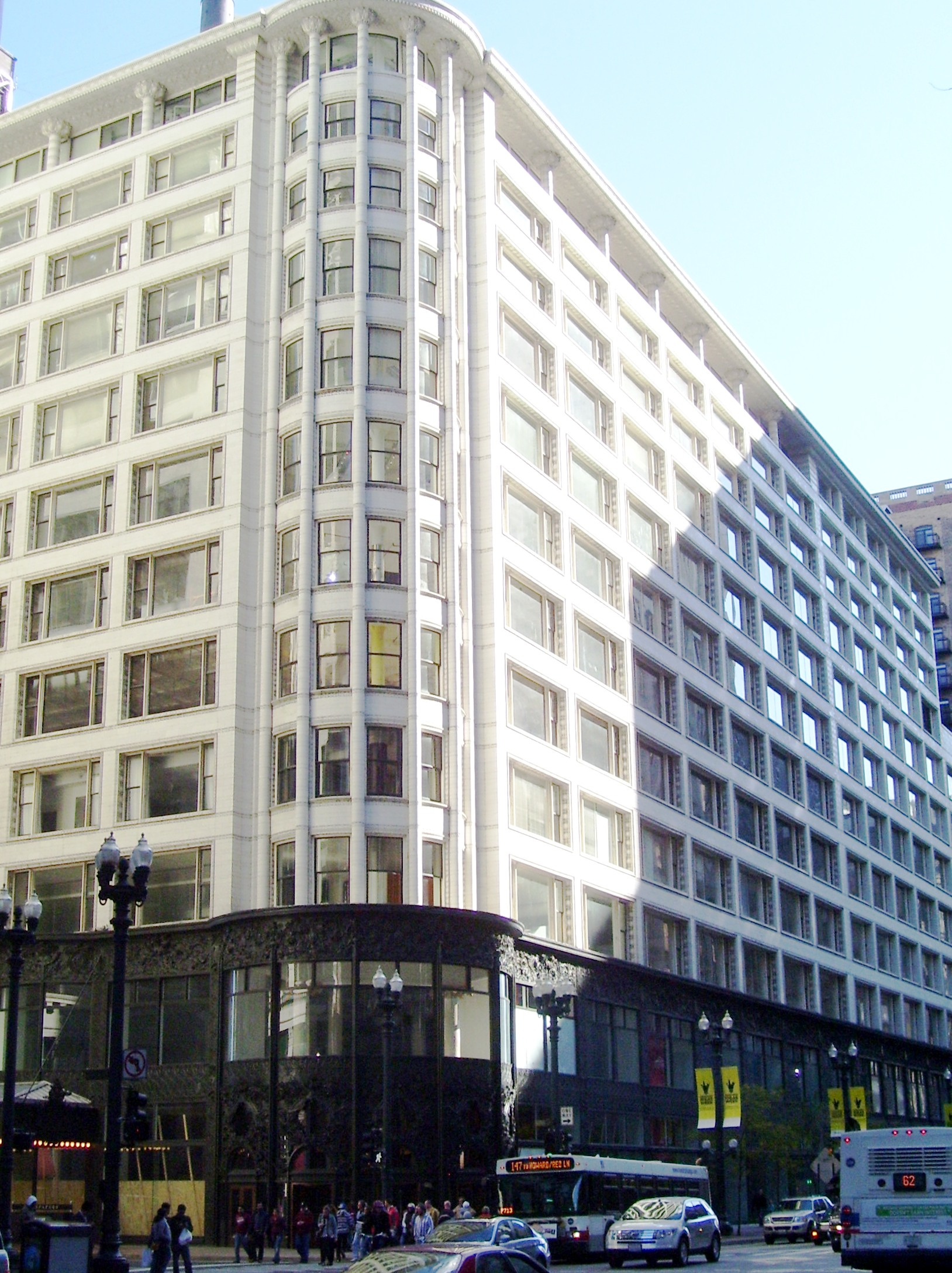
- Exterior of the former Carson Pirie Scott Building flagship store in Chicago, Illinois (2010)
- Trade name: Carson's
- Type: Subsidiary
- Traded as: NYSE: CRP (1994-1998)
- Industry: Retail
- Genre: Department Store
- Founded: 1854 (172 years ago) in Amboy, Illinois
- Founder: Samual Carson and John T. Pirie
- Defunct: August 29, 2018 (8 years ago) (original company)
- Fate: Chapter 7 Bankruptcy Liquidation
- Headquarters: Chicago, Illinois, United States
- Number of locations: 51 (2018)
- Area served: Midwestern United States
- Products: Clothing, footwear, bedding, furniture, jewelry, beauty products, housewares
- Parent: Bergner's (1989–1993); Saks, Inc. (1998–2006); The Bon-Ton (2006–2018); CSC Generation (2018–2021); BrandX (2021–present)
- Subsidiaries: Bergner's (1993-1998); Boston Store (1993-1998)
- Website: carsons.com

Carson Pirie Scott & Co. (also known as Carson's) was an American department store that was founded in 1854, which grew to over 50 locations, primarily in the Midwestern United States. It was sold to the holding company of Bon-Ton in 2006, but still operated under the Carson name. The entire Bon-Ton collection of stores, including Carson's, went into bankruptcy and closed in 2018. Bon-Ton's intellectual property was quickly sold while in bankruptcy, and the new owners reopened shortly afterwards as a BrandX virtual retailer.

== History ==
=== Origins: Carson and Pirie ===
The chain began in 1854 when Samuel Carson and John Thomas Pirie first clerked in the Murray's dry goods store in Peru, Illinois, then opened their own store in LaSalle, followed by one in Amboy. In 1871, the Great Chicago Fire destroyed 60% of the store's stock.

=== Origins: Scott ===
John Edwin Scott operated a dry goods store in Ottawa, Illinois. He later moved up to Chicago and became the first partner of Carson and Pirie in the ownership of a dry goods store which became known as Carson Pirie Scott & Co. Two of Scott's sons, Robert L. and Frederick H., were members of the department store firm.

=== Chicago flagship store ===
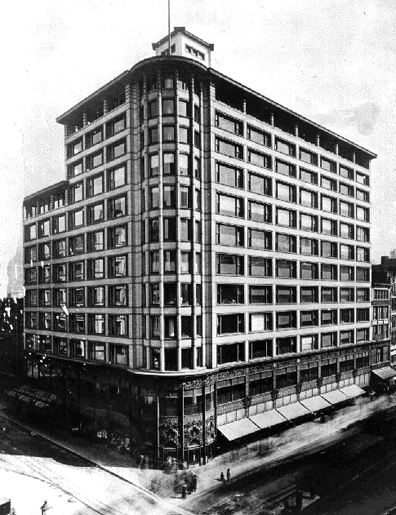
Carsons Pirie Scott & Co building by Louis Sullivan

The flagship store on State Street in the Downtown Chicago Loop is still known as the Carson, Pirie, Scott and Company Building. Louis Sullivan designed it for department store Schlesinger & Mayer, who added to it over the years. When that company went bankrupt in 1904, they sold the building to Carson Pirie Scott in 1904, and it would remain Carson's flagship store until it was announced in August 2006 that after the 2006 Christmas season, the department store in the building would close. After holding clearance sales, Carson's closed in February 2007.

=== 1960s–1980s expansion ===
In 1961, Carson Pirie Scott & Co. greatly expanded in Illinois by purchasing the 20 unit Block & Kuhl chain headquartered in Peoria.

In 1980, to diversify its business, Carson Pirie Scott & Co. borrowed $108 million to buy Dobbs Houses, Inc., an airline caterer and owner of the Toddle House and Steak 'n Egg Kitchen restaurant chains. These were sold in 1988, as was the County Seat clothing chain.

In 1989, Carson Pirie Scott & Co. was acquired by P.A. Bergner & Co. (founded in Peoria), who operated the Bergner's, Charles V. Weise, Myers Brothers and Boston Store chains.

Table of ownership and branding changes
| Year | Description |
|---|---|
| 1961 | Block & Kuhl stores rebranded Carson Pirie Scott |
| 1987 | Carson Pirie Scott buys Donaldson's; Donaldson's rebranded Carson Pirie Scott |
| 1989 | Carson Pirie Scott acquired by P.A. Bergner & Co. who operated the Bergner's, Charles V. Weise, Myers Brothers and Boston Store chains |
| 1998 | Proffitt's Inc., now Saks Incorporated, buys P. A. Bergner & Co. |
| 2005 | Saks sells Carson Pirie Scott as well as Bergner's, Younkers, Boston Store, and Herberger's to Bon-Ton Stores |
| 2018 | Bon-Ton liquidates its department stores |

=== Bergner's bankruptcy ===
In 1991, P.A. Bergner & Co. filed for Chapter 11 bankruptcy; upon emerging from bankruptcy in 1993, it became a NASDAQ publicly traded company, changing its operating name to Carson Pirie Scott & Co. One year later, the company commenced trading on the NYSE under the CRP symbol.

=== Acquisition by Proffitt's/Saks ===
By 1998, Carson Pirie Scott & Co. ownership was held by Proffitt's, Inc., (later renamed Saks Incorporated to reflect the acquisition of Saks Fifth Avenue). The Carson Pirie Scott, Bergner's, and Boston Store chains, along with Younkers and Herberger's nameplates, eventually operated as Saks' Northern Department Store Group (NDSG), based in Milwaukee, Wisconsin. In late 2005, however, the group was put up for sale as Saks Incorporated tried to refocus itself primarily on its core Saks Fifth Avenue stores.

=== Sale to The Bon-Ton and store closings ===
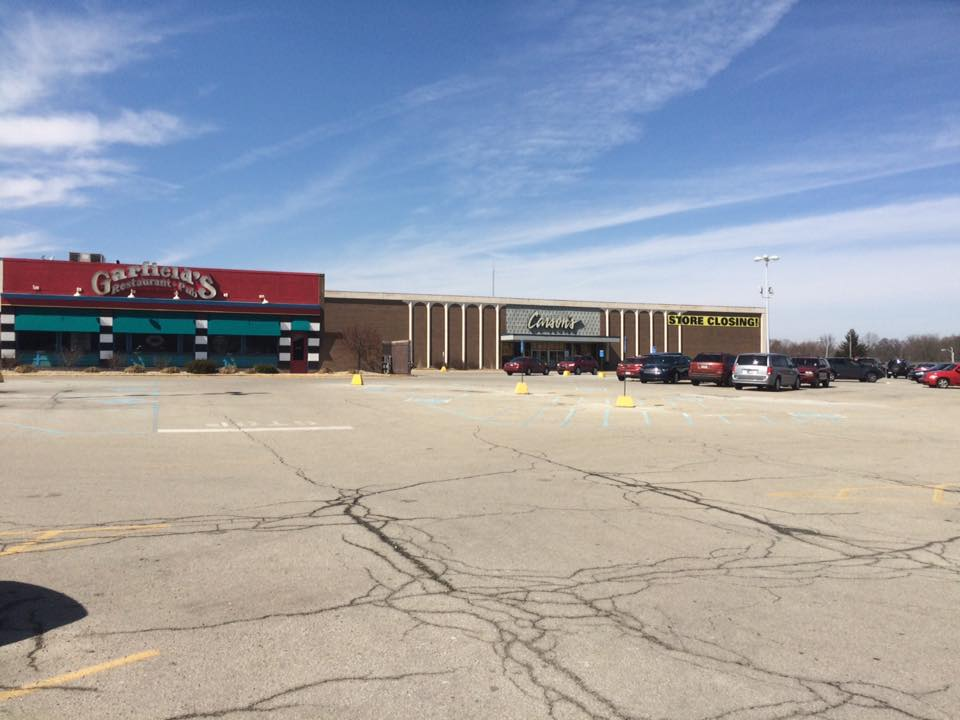
A Carson's store at Mounds Mall in Anderson, Indiana during closing sales in 2018.

Carson's and its associated stores became part of The Bon-Ton Stores Inc. in a $1.1 billion deal completed on March 6, 2006. The group's merchandising and marketing base remained in Milwaukee.

Bon-Ton converted Elder-Beerman stores in Indiana and Michigan to the newly shortened Carson's name in 2011 and 2012. The chain expanded into Metro Detroit in 2013 with the conversion of three Parisian stores.

Bon-Ton announced on April 17, 2018 that they would cease operations and began liquidating all 267 stores after two liquidators, Great American Group and Tiger Capital Group, won an auction for the company. The bid was estimated to be worth $775.5 million. This included all remaining Carson's stores after 164 years of operation. According to national retail reporter Mitch Nolen, stores closed within 10 to 12 weeks.

=== Reopening ===
The intellectual property of Bon-Ton, including Carson's, was quickly sold in bankruptcy to CSC Generation, and online retail was reopened. The new owners, based in Merrillville, Indiana, were also exploring opening new store locations. On October 29, 2018; Under this new ownership and using the same company and stores' names, Bon-Ton started announcing it would reopen the Evergreen Park, Illinois Carson's store on November 24 (Black Friday)–one of Bon-Ton's first brick-and-mortar stores to reopen. Bon-Ton has also announced plans to open brick-and-mortar Carson's stores in Bloomingdale, Lombard and Orland Park. The sole location to return to operation was in Evergreen Park; the company never followed through in Orland Park and Lombard. The Evergreen Park location closed in October 2020 as a result of the COVID-19 pandemic. Carson's currently has no brick and mortar stores and exists only as on online retailer. As of November 2021, Carson's website was preparing for another relaunch by BrandX who has also acquired the Stage Store trademarks; however, as of February 2026, the site remained in limbo, showing only a message of "coming soon."

== Logos ==
Carson Pirie Scott logos
| Carson Pirie Scott logo used between 1946 through 1978. |
| Carson Pirie Scott Logo used from 1978 through the company's sale to Bergner in 1989. The box design and "& Co." suffix was dropped in 1986; this later variant of the logo could still be found on older store signage through the company's end. |
| Final Carson Pirie Scott logo before the name was shortened, which adopted the red insignia and font of Bergner's. |

== See also ==
- Chicago architecture
- Edens Plaza -shopping center formerly owned by Carson's, and formerly featuring a Carson's location
