= The Bon-Ton =

American online retailer

Bonton
- Trade name: Bonton
- Formerly: S. Grumbacher & Sons
- Type: Subsidiary
- Traded as: Expert Market: BONTQ (1991–2018)
- Industry: Retail
- Founded: 1898; 128 years ago (as S. Grumbacher & Son); in York, Pennsylvania
- Founders: Samuel Grumbacher; Max Grumbacher
- Headquarters: York, Pennsylvania (1898–2021); New York City, U.S. (2021–present)
- Key people: Deepak Ramani (president, 2021–present)
- Parent: CSC Generation (2018–2021); Unique Brands (2021–present)
- Website: bonton.com

Bonton Holdings Inc. operating as Bonton (/bɒntɒn/) is an American former department store chain and group founded in 1898 whose name is now used with an e-commerce website.

Bonton's stores operated in Western New York, Pennsylvania, New Jersey, West Virginia, Maryland, and throughout the Midwestern United States. The formerly York, Pennsylvania–based company filed for bankruptcy in February 2018 and sold the name to CSC Generation, which in turn sold it to BrandX.com in 2021, an e-commerce site under the brand name. Along with Bergner's, Boston Store, Carson's, Elder-Beerman, Herberger's, and Younkers, the names of most of the defunct retail group's department store chains are owned by BrandX.

== History ==
=== 19th century ===
The Bon-Ton was founded in 1898, when Max Grumbacher and his father, Samuel, opened S. Grumbacher & Son, a one-room millinery and dry goods store on Market Street in York, Pennsylvania.

=== 20th century ===
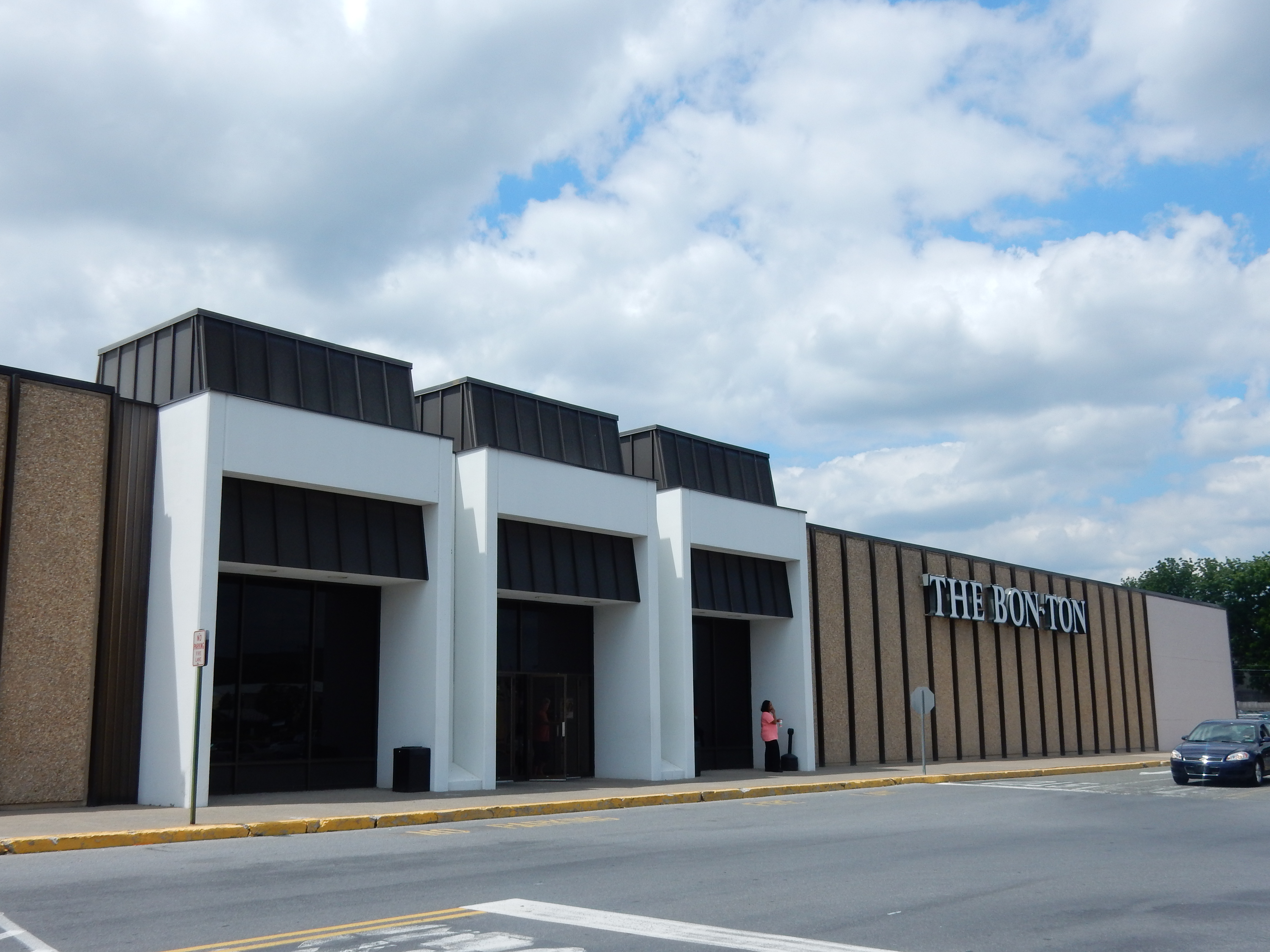
The former Bon-Ton store at the South Mall in Salisbury Township, Pennsylvania, which originally had been Hess's South

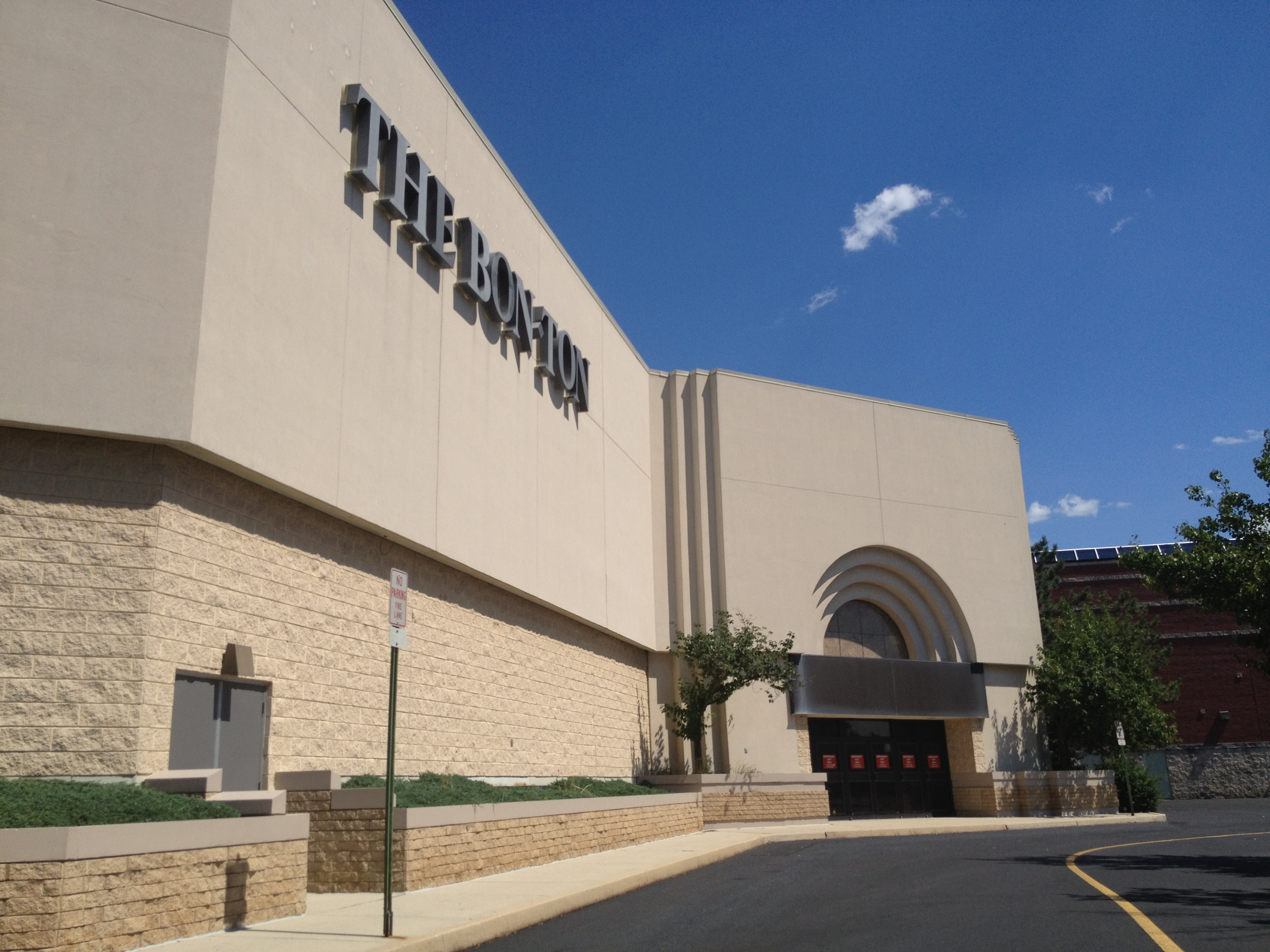
The former Bon-Ton store at York Galleria in York, Pennsylvania

As reported in the Carlisle Evening Sentinel on October 31, 1902, the store chain had two additional locations under the name "Bon-Ton Millinery" in Trenton, New Jersey, and five Pennsylvania locations: Carlisle, Lancaster, Lebanon, Altoona, and East Liverpool. The name "Bon-Ton" was drawn from a British term connoting the "elite" or "high society".

Through World War I and the Roaring Twenties, the Grumbacher's store chain grew bigger, and in 1929, the company was incorporated as S. Grumbacher & Son, Inc. In 1931, Max's son, Max Samuel (M.S.), joined the company. When Max the elder died in 1933, his widow, Daisy, and their two sons, M.S. and Richard, continued the business, forming a partnership in 1936.

Following World War II, the Grumbacher family expanded operations even further. In 1946, an additional Bon-Ton was opened, in Hanover, Pennsylvania. Two years later, the company moved outside Pennsylvania, acquiring Eyerly's in Hagerstown, Maryland, and, in 1957, purchasing McMeen's in Lewistown, Pennsylvania. These early moves set Bon-Ton's policy of growing into adjacent areas by opening new stores and acquiring existing businesses.

Over the next three decades, The Bon-Ton Stores continued to expand. In 1961, M.S.'s son, M. Thomas "Tim", entered the business, representing the fourth generation of Grumbachers. During the 1960s, the company opened new Eyerly's and Bon-Ton stores in several Pennsylvania communities and one in West Virginia. In 1969, they retired McMeen's name. During the 1970s, as the popularity of shopping centers began to grow, The Bon-Ton opened 11 new stores in Pennsylvania and West Virginia.

During the 1980s, the retail department store industry rapidly consolidated as major chains bought their competitors. The Bon-Ton Stores began the decade by opening more stores, establishing a new division, Maxwell's, and acquiring L S Good, including its Fowler's department stores. When Tim Grumbacher was made CEO in 1985, the company operated 18 stores in four states. Two years later, the company made a major move, buying the 11-store Pomeroy's chain from Allied Department Stores. That purchase allowed the company to move into seven new markets in Pennsylvania.

In 1991, The Bon-Ton acquired J.W. Rhodes in Ithaca, New York. The Bon-Ton entered the Lancaster, Pennsylvania, market in 1992 with the acquisition of two Watt & Shand locations in downtown Lancaster and Park City Center. The company continued to expand its presence in the Albany region in 1993 with a store in the Wilton Mall in Saratoga Springs in the former Addis & Dey's space. In the late 1980s, the company also acquired a York, Pennsylvania–based family-operated department store, Mailman's, from Stanley Mailman, which converted to a Bon-Ton location.

In July 1994, The Bon-Ton purchased the 127-year-old Adam, Meldrum, and Anderson Company chain based in Buffalo, New York, for $42.6 million (~$83.8 million in 2025), converting all locations to The Bon Ton. Around the same time, The Bon-Ton purchased Chappell's of Syracuse, New York, and Hess's of Allentown, Pennsylvania.

The Bon-Ton initially retained and operated Hess's flagship location until 1996, when it closed after nearly 100 years of continuous operation. The site was eventually demolished. Its Allentown store, Hess's former south Allentown location, was the anchor of the South Mall.

In 1994, The Bon-Ton entered the Rochester, New York, market in three former McCurdy's locations, and in a former McCurdy's space (originally Iszard's) in Elmira, New York. The following spring, the company opened a fourth Rochester location in a former Sibley's/Kaufmann's location. In March 1995, The Bon-Ton closed the landmark downtown Lancaster store. Later that year, they closed the downtown AM&A's location. 1998's expansion included a new store in Westfield, Massachusetts, making it The Bon-Ton Stores' first presence in New England.

=== 21st century ===
In October 2003, The Bon-Ton expanded its reach into Ohio and the lower Midwest by acquiring the 68-store Elder-Beerman store chain. Following an attempt to convert to a privately held company, Elder-Beerman was offered more cash for its outstanding stock as part of the buyout.

On November 25, 2003, Bon-Ton reported a net loss in the third quarter of $1.7 million, or $0.11 per share, including an asset impairment charge of $0.10 per share.

The Bon-Ton Stores chain doubled in size in November 2005 with the $1.1 billion (~$1.74 billion in 2025) purchase of the 142 stores of Saks' Northern Department Store Group, headquartered in downtown Milwaukee, Wisconsin. The corporate headquarters remained in York, Pennsylvania, but the merchandising headquarters was relocated to Milwaukee. As with the Elder-Beerman acquisition, no store names were changed in the transaction. The newly acquired store group included Carson Pirie Scott, later branded as Carson's, Bergner's, Boston Store, Herberger's, and Younkers.

In September 2006, The Bon-Ton purchased four Parisian stores (plus one under construction) from Belk, which had just purchased the chain; the stores were located in Michigan, Indiana, and Ohio, outside Belk's traditional operating territory. The stores in Indiana and Ohio soon became Carson Pirie Scott and Elder-Beerman, respectively. The three Michigan stores continued to be positioned as Parisian until 2013, when they became Carson's stores.

From 2011 through 2017, the company did not post a net profit. It also had a somewhat high degree of executive turnover. In December 2013, Mike Nemoir, senior vice president, announced he would retire after four decades in the retail industry at Bon-Ton and its predecessor companies on March 28, 2014. In May 2017, Tim Grumbacher retired after 50 years on the board of directors, and more than 25 as its chairman. He was Bon-Ton's CEO from 1985 to 1995 and held other senior management positions. Grumbacher's wife and fellow board member, Debra Simon, was elected to succeed him.

In the fall of 2016, Bon-Ton launched dedicated "Close to Home" areas within 45 stores, offering carefully selected hand-picked merchandise from designers, artisans, and entrepreneurs in each market. In February 2017, the chain announced it would expand this concept to at least 100 stores in 25 states.

==== Bankruptcy and liquidation ====
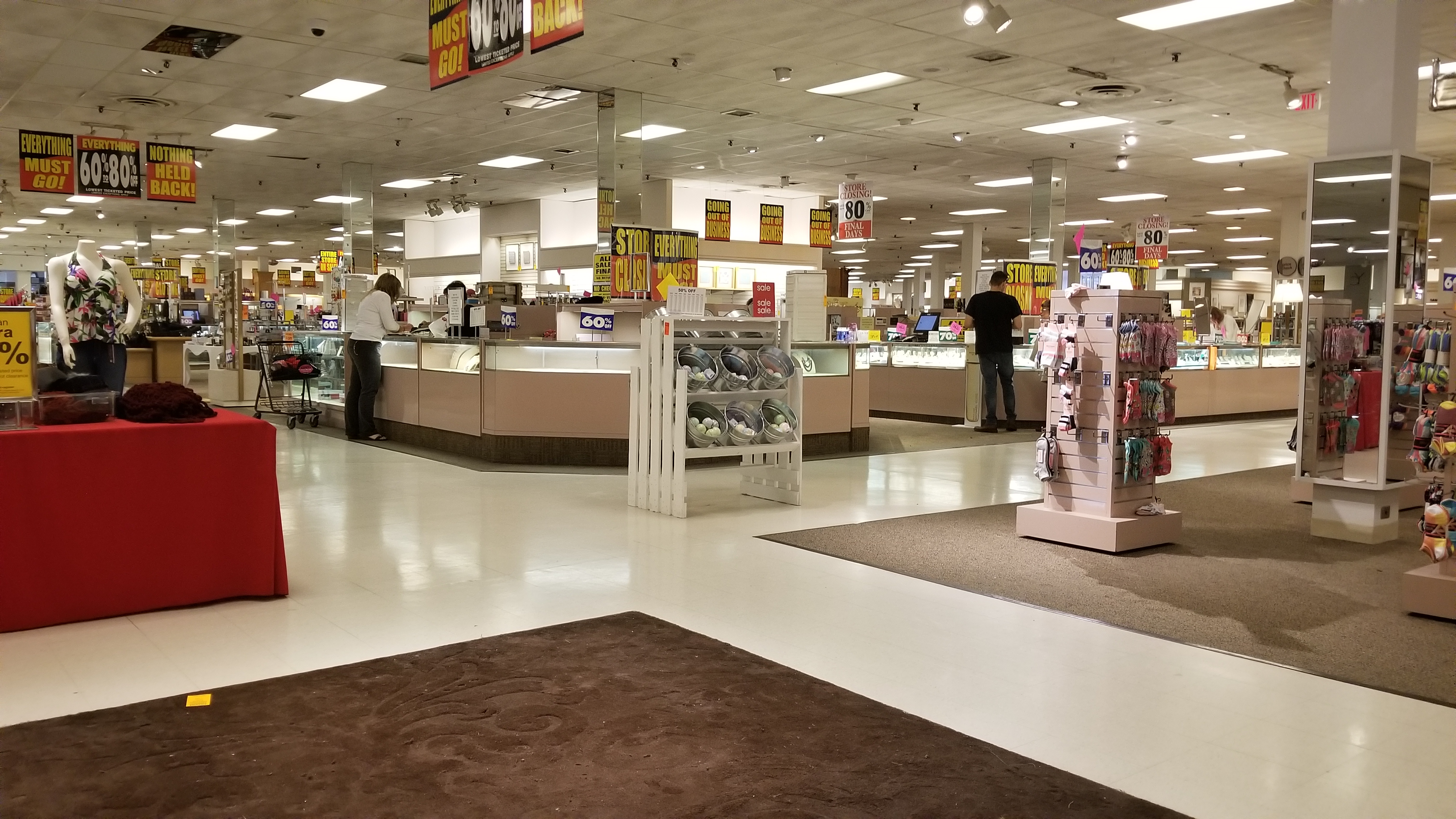
Colonial Park Mall store in Lower Paxton Township, Pennsylvania, during its final Bon-Ton sale

On December 18, 2017, Bon-Ton Stores revealed that after sales had fallen 6% in both the second and third quarters, it would be unable to satisfy a $14 million (~$18.1 million in 2025) interest payment due December 15. The company entered into a standard grace period with its lenders. Analysis from Standard & Poor's downgraded the company into selective default, and predicted an out-of-court restructuring or a bankruptcy filing after the grace period.

In late January 2018, The Bon-Ton announced a decision to optimize its brick-and-mortar format by shuttering 42 stores in 14 states, in addition to five stores previously announced.

In February 2018, The Bon-Ton Stores Inc. filed for Chapter 11 bankruptcy protection with the likelihood of satisfying its long-term debt.

On April 9, 2018, it was announced that Washington Prime Group and Namdar Realty Group had made a substantial offer to acquire The Bon-Ton. On April 11, 2018, however, a judge decided that the company would not be allowed to pay a $500,000 (~$630,462 in 2025) "work fee" to cover the costs of Washington Prime and Namdar's due diligence and legal fees, rejecting the offer. The next highest offer came from The Great American Group LLC and Tiger Capital Group LLC, both specialists in store liquidation. On April 17, Reuters reported that the court had approved The Great American Group LLC and Tiger Capitol Group LLC's offer for $775.5 million and that it would liquidate all 267 stores and convert its Chapter 11 bankruptcy to Chapter 7.

On August 30, Great America Group said all Pennsylvania locations were officially closed, and buildings would be vacated by the next day.

==== Relaunch ====
The Bon-Ton logo used until 2015

The Bon-Ton logo from 2015 to 2022

On August 31, 2018, The Bon-Ton Stores, Inc.-owned retail websites were updated with "Stay Tuned" messages, indicating that the company's respective brands would relaunch; the liquidator stated that the company was being acquired. On September 6, 2018, it was reported that the purchaser was Merrillville, Indiana–based CSC Generation, a holding company backed by Chinese and American venture capital firms, which owns the membership buying service DirectBuy.

CSC Generation agreed to pay $900,000 to acquire the Bon-Ton which includes their official branding, trademarks, websites, and database of 24.5 million unique customer records and 5.6 million email addresses. While the retailer would be focused on its digital format, there were plans to reopen some physical stores in several states. However, only one such store was rolled out, in Evergreen Park, Illinois, and it closed in October 2020 as a result of the COVID-19 outbreak. Beauty products company L'Oréal USA successfully bid $312,900 for data on Bon-Ton's cosmetics and fragrance customers.

On September 10, 2018, the federal bankruptcy judge approved the sale to CSC Generation; on September 14, the new owner relaunched for all of its department store brands. In addition to apparel and home goods, they also sold televisions and major kitchen appliances.

Subsequently, in early 2021, CSC Generation sold Bon-Ton to New York-based BrandX.com, Inc in a private sale. According to a May 2022 article on WWD, BrandX will relaunch Bon-Ton and open a brick-and-mortar format Carson's in Illinois.

In September 2022, The Bon-Ton relaunched as the first brand relaunch by BrandX.com.

== See also ==
- List of retailers affected by the retail apocalypse
- Retail apocalypse
