= Southridge Mall (Wisconsin) =

Shopping mall in Milwaukee County, Wisconsin, U.S.

Coordinates: 42.948283°N 88.006688°W

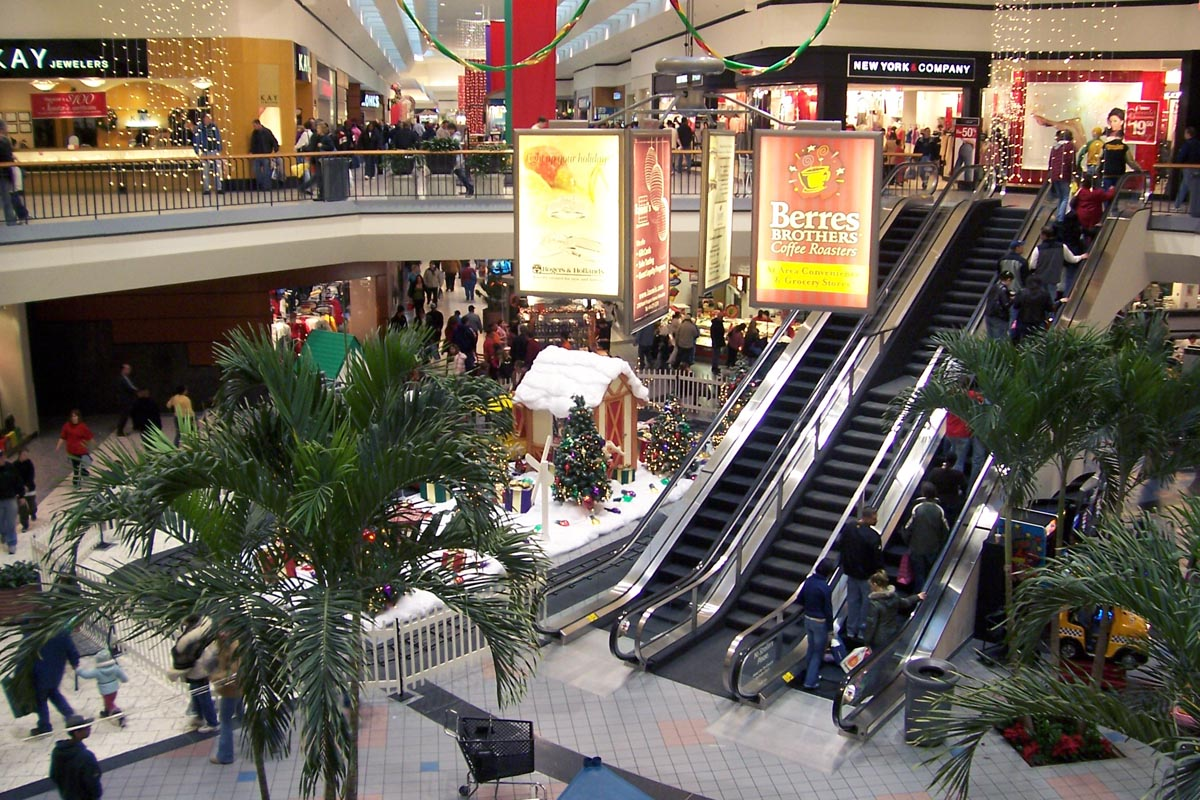
- Southridge Mall, 2005
- Location: Greendale, Wisconsin, U.S.
- Opened: September 10, 1970; 56 years ago
- Developer: Herb Kohl and Taubman Company
- Manager: Spinoso Real Estate Group
- Owner: Southridge Mall Member LLC
- Num. of anchor tenants: 8 (6 open, 1 vacant, 1 under construction)
- Floors: 2
- Public transit: Milwaukee County Transit System

Southridge Mall is a regional shopping mall located in the Milwaukee County suburbs of Greendale and Greenfield, Wisconsin. At 1,177,783 square feet (109,420 square metres) it is Wisconsin's second largest mall behind Mayfair Mall in Wauwatosa, tied with Fox River Mall in Appleton. The mall's anchor stores are TJ Maxx, Dick's Sporting Goods, Golf Galaxy, Macy's, JCPenney, and Round 1 Entertainment. There is 1 vacant anchor stores that were once Kohl's. Sears closed in September 2017, Kohl's relocated to a mixed use development on September 29, 2018. The Boston Store closed in Summer 2018 as parent company Bon-Ton went out of business and the building and surrounding site is to be redeveloped into an apartment complex. The former Sears was replaced by Dick's Sporting Goods, Golf Galaxy, Round 1 Entertainment, and TJ Maxx.

== History ==
Southridge opened in 1970 as the southern sister mall to Northridge Mall. Both malls were located on 76th Street, close to major east/west artery roads. Both were developed by Herb Kohl and Taubman Centers, Inc.

In 1988, the Kohl family sold its retail interests in Southridge and the mall was acquired by Western Development Corporation, a Washington, D.C.-based real estate management firm. In 2020, the mall's ownership was transferred to its lender through a deed in lieu of foreclosure.

One of the mall's original anchors was Gimbels. Chicago-based Marshall Field's, acquired this location and five other Gimbels from their parent company, BATUS. Marshall Field's operated the location from 1986 until 1989. They then sold their Southridge and Northridge locations to Sheboygan-based Prange's. Prange's would be later acquired and rebranded to Younkers in 1992. Younkers and Boston Store's then parent company, Saks, Inc, would close the former Younkers location in 2000, to avoid overlapping and self-competition. The space would later be subdivided among Steve & Barry's on the lower level (2005), and Linens 'n Things (2005) and Cost Plus World Market (2005) on the upper level. Linens 'n Things and Steve & Barry's liquidated nationwide and closed in 2008 and 2009 respectively, while Cost Plus World Market closed in 2011. The building would be redeveloped yet again for Macy's who opened in March 2012.

Some other original anchors at the mall were JCPenney (which is still open as of November 2026), Sears (which closed in September 2017), Boston Store (which closed in 2018), and Kohl's (closed and relocated in September 2018)

In 2015, Sears Holdings spun off 235 of its properties, including the Sears at Southridge Mall, into Seritage Growth Properties.

In 2023, Old Navy and DSW closed at the mall.

As of 2025, plans were submitted by Barrett Lo Visionary Development to the Greendale Plan Commission to build an apartment complex on the Boston Store site. Greendale Plan Commission unanimously approved plans to raze the former Boston Store and construct a multi-phase, mixed-used apartment complex with retail. This new apartment building is looking to be built at a cost of $100 million and would have 740 apartments. Demolition of the former Boston Store would occur to make way for the construction on the apartment complex. The former Boston Store was purchased by Barrett Lo Visionary Development in 2026 for $3.3 million.
