= Milwaukee County Historical Society =

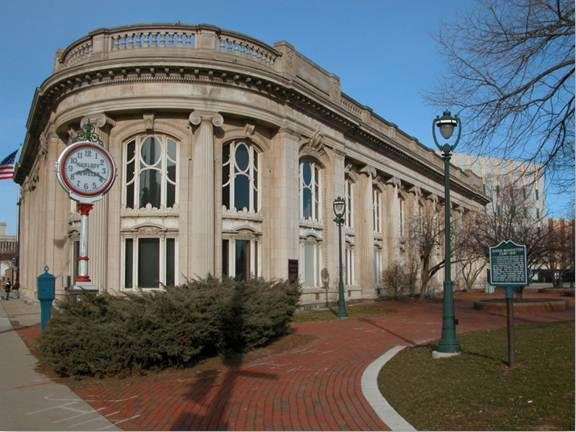
- Kilbourn Avenue facade of the Milwaukee County Historical Society
- Established: 1935
- Location: 910 North Old World Third Street Milwaukee, WI 53202
- Type: History Museum & Research Center
- Director: Mame Croze McCully
- Website: https://milwaukeehistory.net/

The Milwaukee County Historical Society, also known as MCHS, is a local historical society in Milwaukee County, Wisconsin. Founded in 1935, the organization was formed to preserve, collect, recognize, and make available materials related to Milwaukee County history. It is located in downtown Milwaukee in the former Second Ward Savings Bank building.

MCHS houses the Harry H. Anderson Research Library and a museum. The library collects and preserves manuscripts, records, photographs, and family history information. The museum preserves three-dimensional artifacts related to Milwaukee County history, including paintings, ribbons, uniforms, flags, furniture, and china in a collection of over 20,000 items.

== Locations ==
In addition to the main museum and research library, the MCHS owns three historic house museums and one historic site: the Lowell Damon House in Wauwatosa; the Kilbourntown House in Estabrook Park; and the Jeremiah Curtin House and Trimborn Farm in Greendale.

=== Benjamin Church House ===
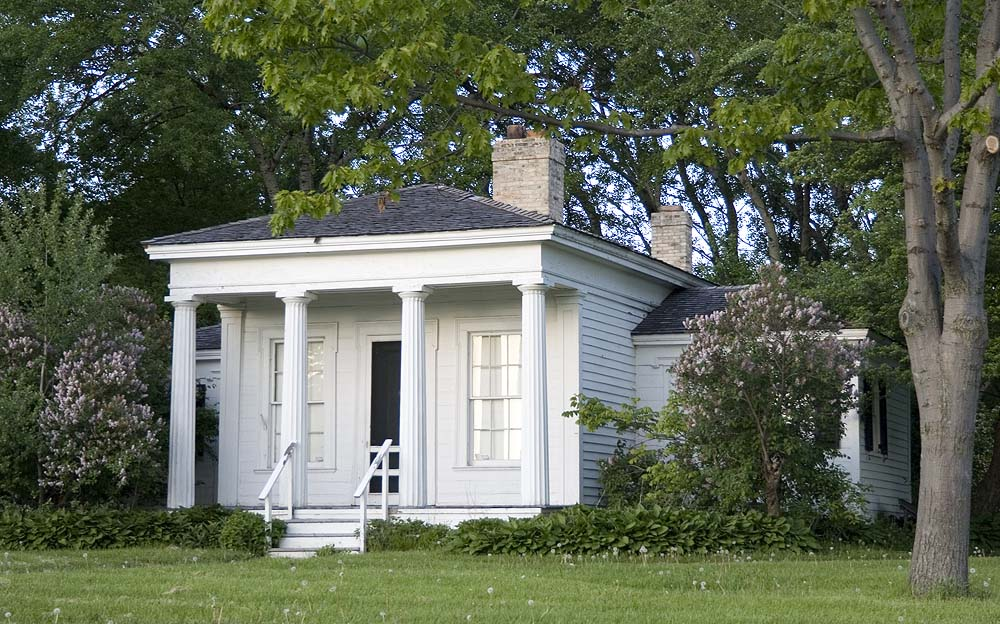
Benjamin Church House

The Benjamin Church House (also known as Kilbourntown House), a wood and brick residence, was built during 1843–1844 by a pioneer carpenter of that name in Kilbourntown, a settlement on the west side of the Milwaukee River. In 1846, Kilbourntown merged with Juneautown on the east side of the river and Walker's Point to the south to create Milwaukee, today the largest city in Wisconsin.

The house, located on Fourth Street between West Cherry and West Galena Streets, was constructed in Greek Revival style architecture with four front columns and symmetry of floor plan. This style was also known as Greek temple or national style.

In the 1930s, the house was recognized as having historical value worthy of rescue, with local Cream City brick and hand-hewn timbers among its distinctive features. In 1972, the Benjamin Church House was added to the National Register of Historic Places.

=== Trimborn Farm and the Jeremiah Curtain House ===
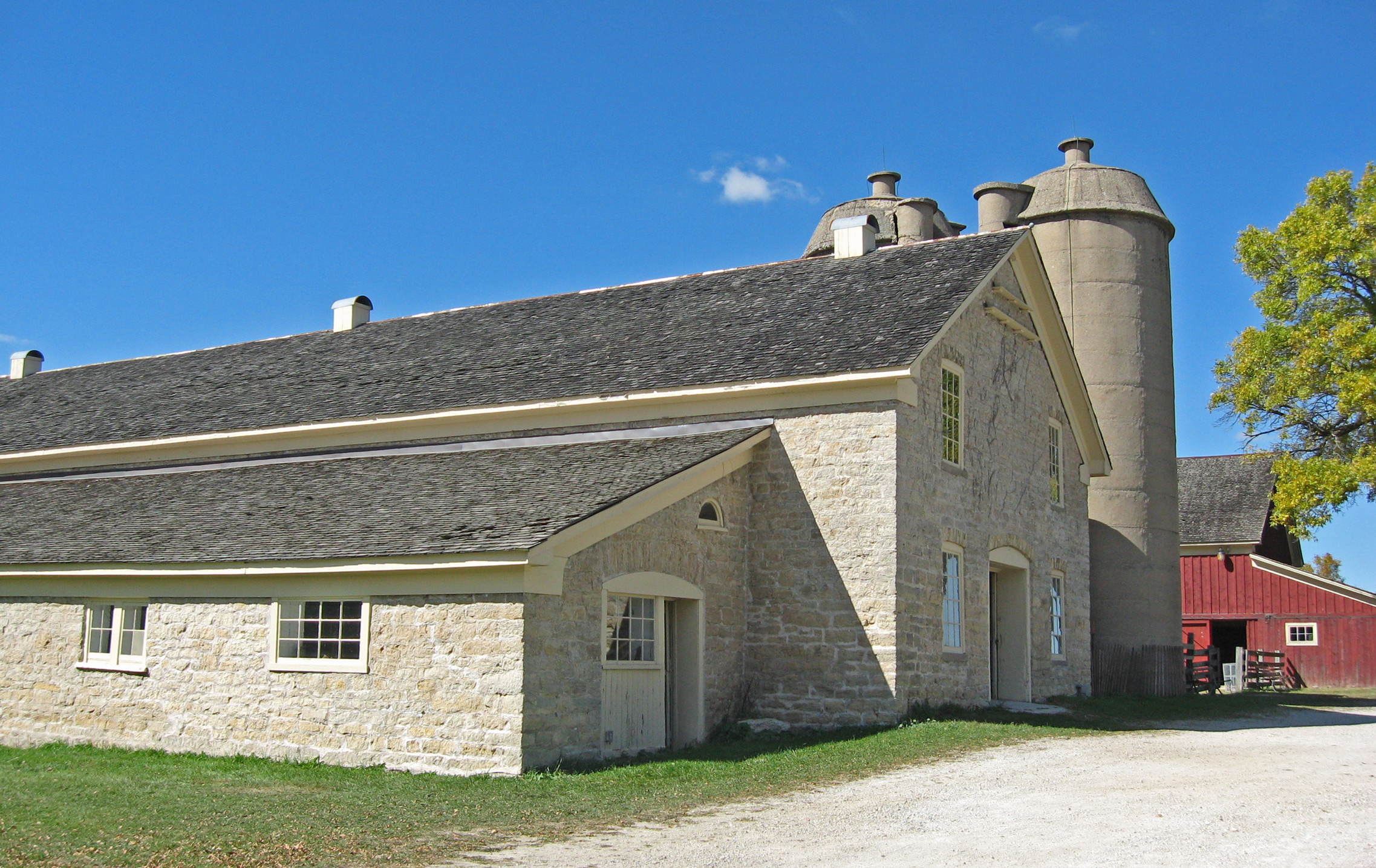
Trimborn Farm

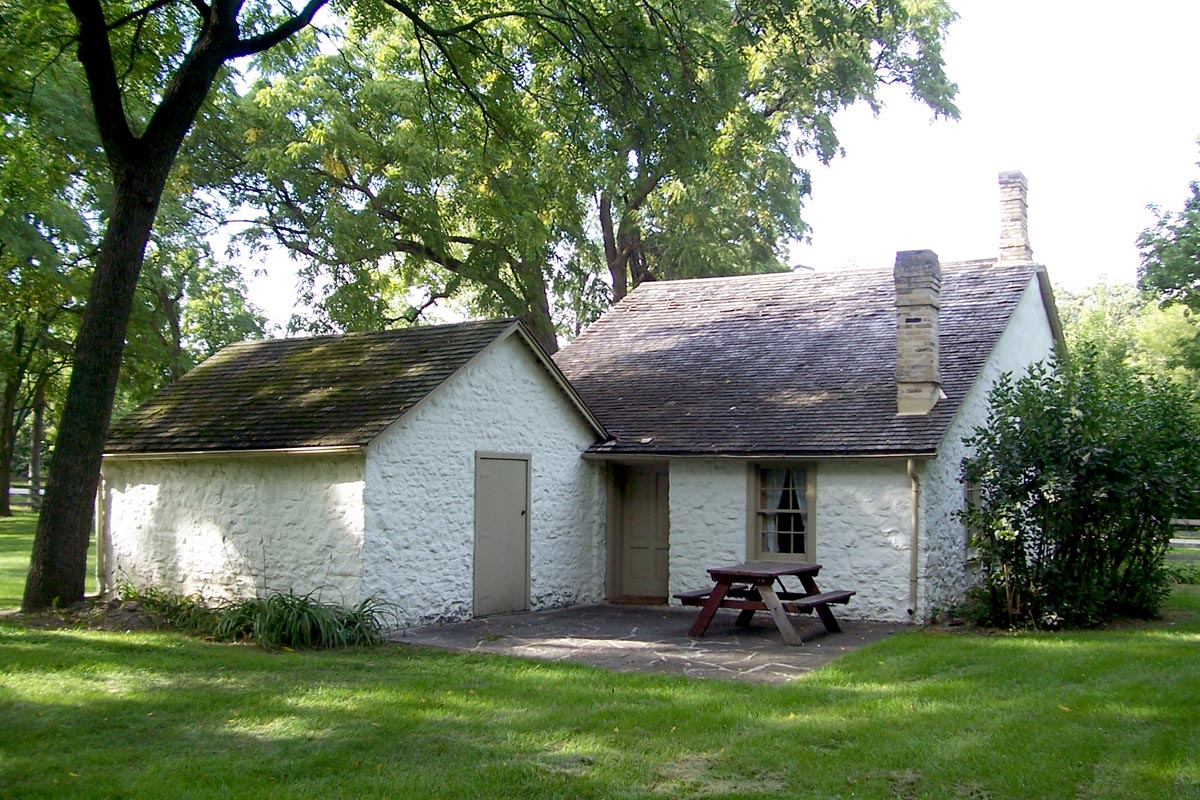
Jeremiah Curtin House

Trimborn Farm is a Victorian era estate located in Greendale, Wisconsin. Spanning 7.5 acres (18.5 hectares) and nine buildings, it is listed on the National Register of Historic Places. The farm is also a State Historic Site and designated Milwaukee County Landmark.

Property highlights include:

- Farmhouse — Constructed in Greek Revival style during the 1850s using Cream City brick, a distinctive, light colored brick made locally.
- Granary — Built in the 1850s using a technique on the interior called brick noggin to protect against air infiltration. This building functioned as a bunkhouse and granary.
- Lime kilns — In the 1840s and 1850s four lime kilns were constructed to heat limestone taken from the nearby quarry and turn it in to lime powder.
- Stone barn — Beginning in 1858 it was built in three phases, using limestone from the quarry. Two concrete silos were added in 1920.
- Threshing barn — Built in 1858, using vertical board and batten siding. The barn was used to store grain and house animals.

The Jeremiah Curtin House is an unusual stone building built in 1846. The boyhood home of noted American linguist and folklorist Jeremiah Curtin, it was later sold to the Trimborn family and has remained part of the Trimborn estate ever since. The house is listed on the National Register of Historic Places.

=== Lowell Damon House ===
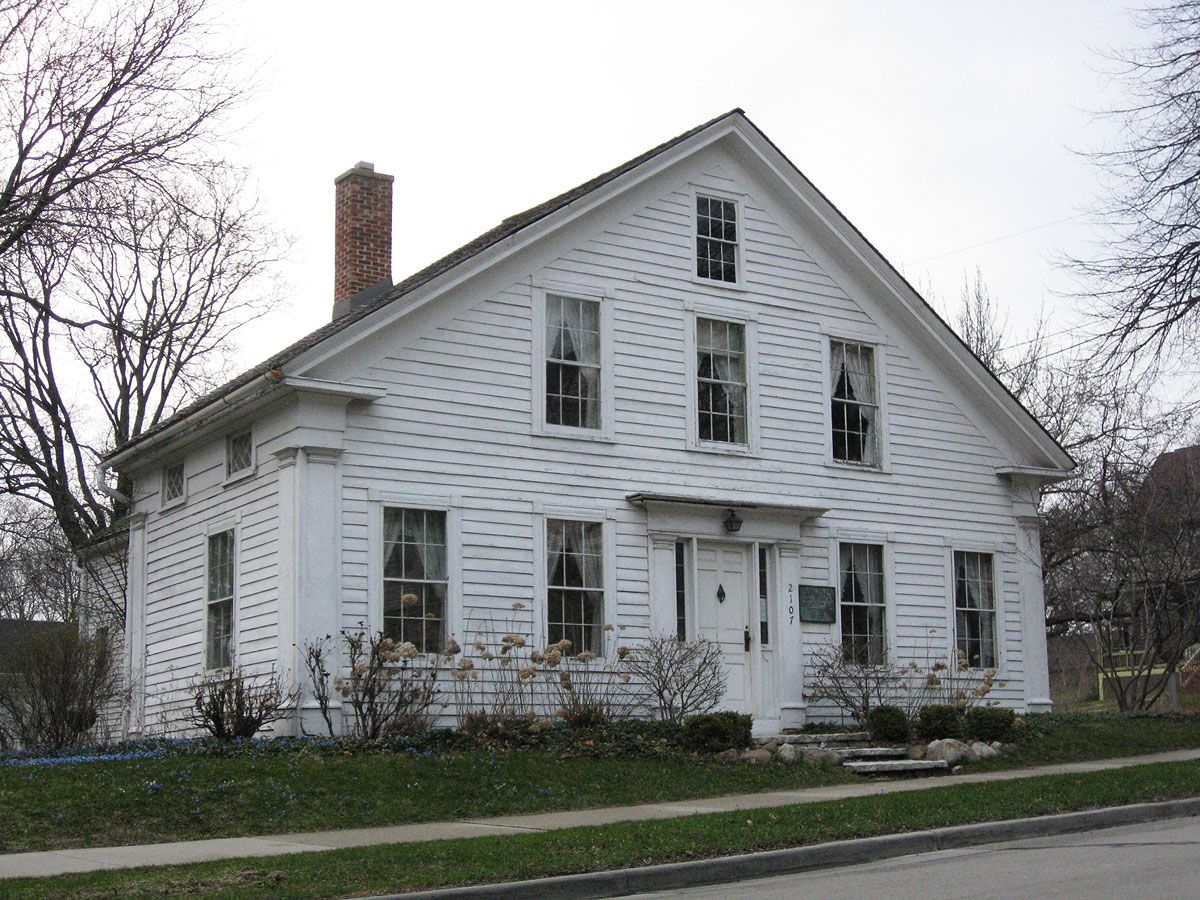
The Lowell Damon House

The Lowell Damon House is the oldest in Wauwatosa, Wisconsin. It was built by Oliver Lowell, who came to Wauwatosa from New Hampshire, and his son-in-law, Jonathon Wainwright. Lowell Damon, Oliver's son, added on to the house in 1846.

== Activities ==
The MCHS hosts events throughout the year, including educational programs, fundraisers, and a Civil War reenactment and an arts and crafts fair at Trimborn Farm. The MCHS celebrated its 75th anniversary in 2010 with a series of events and online exhibits.

In 2012, the Milwaukee County Historical Society unveiled a historical blog, titled MKE Memoirs, to chronicle events and exhibits held at MCHS and to share stories from its archives and collections.

== Building renovation and restoration ==
The building underwent renovation to accommodate the film, Public Enemies. The ceilings and floors were restored on the main and upper levels. In 2012, a piece of the building broke off and fell onto the street below. Protective guards were placed around the building to protect pedestrians while Milwaukee County decided how to properly and safely restore the facade.

The building that houses the MCHS celebrated its 100th anniversary on February 3, 2013.

== See also ==
- List of historical societies in Wisconsin
