= Greendale, Wisconsin =

- Village
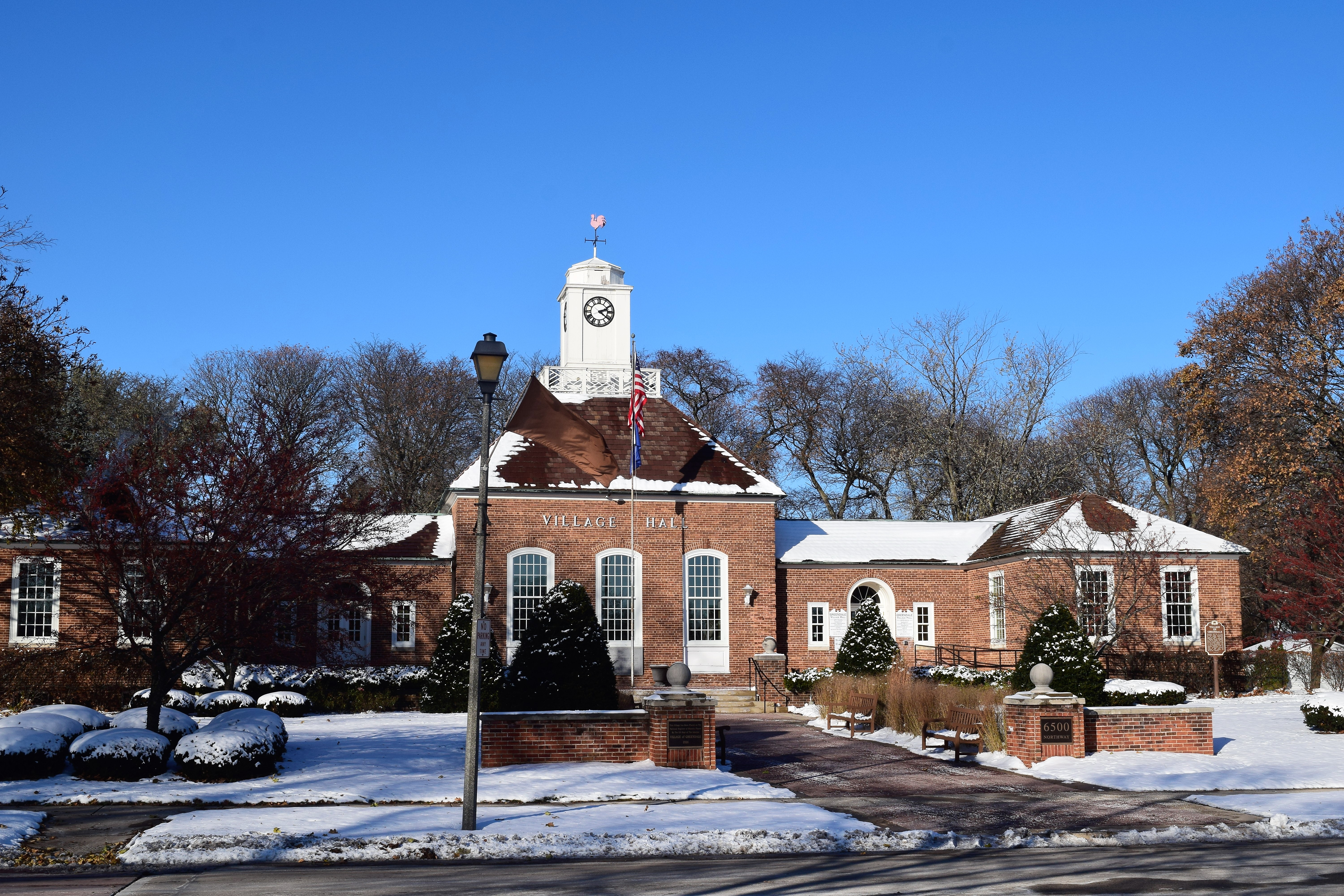
- Greendale Village Hall

- Location of Greendale in Milwaukee County, Wisconsin.
- Coordinates: 42°56′15″N 87°59′49″W
- Country: United States
- State: Wisconsin
- County: Milwaukee

Area
  - Total: 5.58 sq mi (14.44 km^{2})
  - Land: 5.56 sq mi (14.41 km^{2})
  - Water: 0.0077 sq mi (0.02 km^{2})
- Elevation: 738 ft (225 m)

Population (2020)
  - Total: 14,854
  - Estimate (2021): 14,652
  - Density: 2,541.2/sq mi (981.16/km^{2})
- Time zone: UTC-6 (Central (CST))
  - Summer (DST): UTC-5 (CDT)
- ZIP Code: 53129
- Area code: 414
- FIPS code: 55-31125
- GNIS feature ID: 1565837
- Website: www.greendale.org

Greendale is a village in Milwaukee County, Wisconsin, United States. The population was 14,854 at the 2020 census. Greendale is located southwest of Milwaukee and is a part of the Milwaukee metropolitan area. A planned community, it was established by the US government during the Great Depression.

== History ==
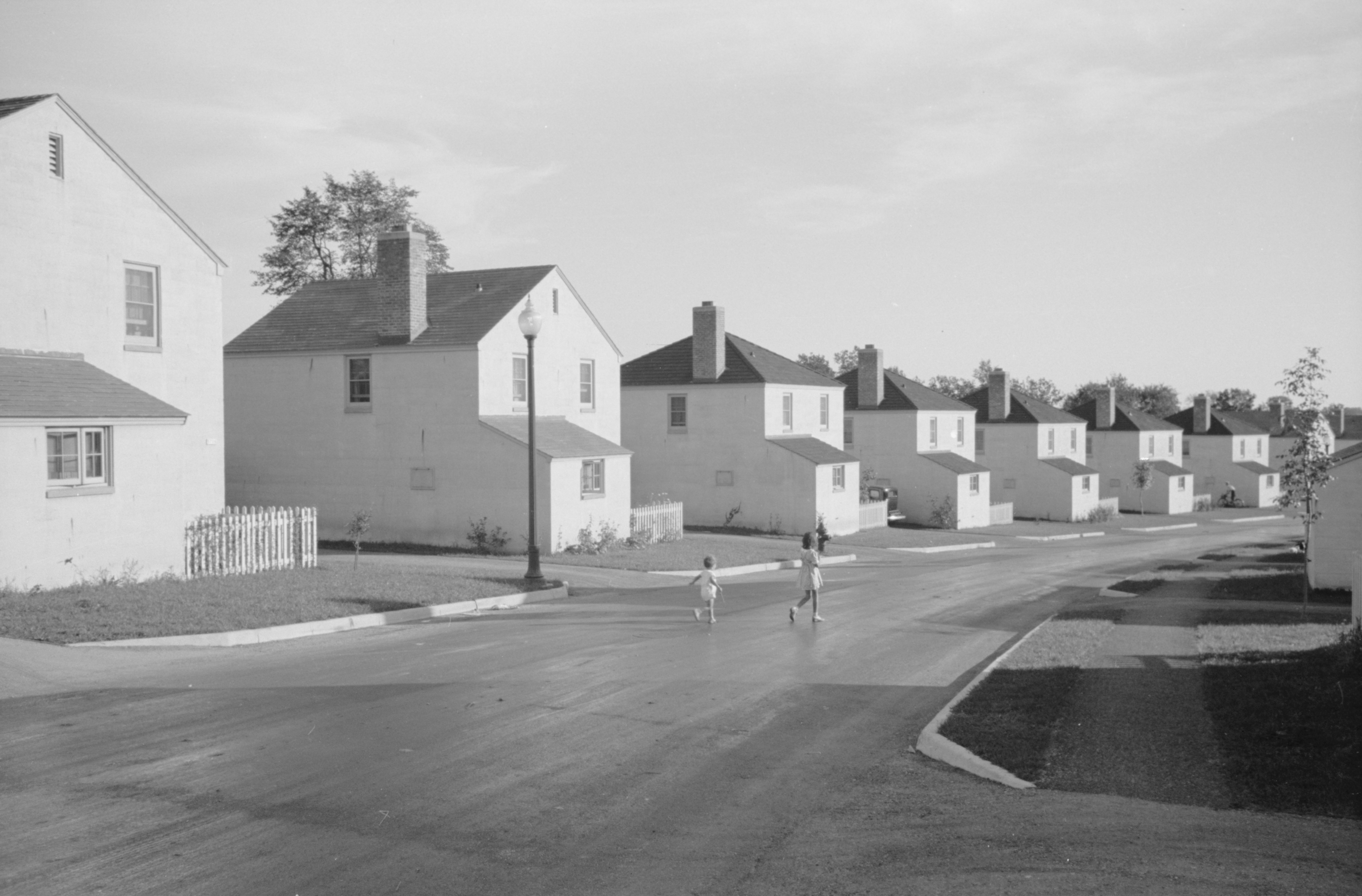
Houses in Greendale, 1939

The first recorded inhabitants of the Greendale area were various Native American tribes, including the Potawatomi. The 1833 Treaty of Chicago struck an agreement between the United States government that required the Chippewa, Odawa, and Potawatomi tribes to cede to the US government 5,000,000 acres (2,000,000 ha). In exchange for ceding their lands in the area, they were to receive monetary payments and lands west of the Mississippi in Indian Territory.

Greendale was one of three government-sponsored "Greenbelt" communities constructed by the Resettlement Administration, starting in 1936, as part of President Franklin Roosevelt's New Deal. The other Greenbelt communities were Greenbelt, Maryland and Greenhills, Ohio. Greendale was incorporated as a village on November 1, 1938. The planners and selection committees excluded African-American families from renting homes and created a racially segregated and all-white suburban community.

The original downtown area included the village hall, styled after Colonial Williamsburg, 366 new homes comprising 572 living units, and several businesses. Buildings were generally designed with concrete block construction covered with cement paint outside and plastered walls inside. Most originally had Ludowici tile roofs, but some featured asbestos shingles. These homes are often referred to as "Greendale Originals".

The Greenbelt communities were patterned after the British garden city movement urban planning concept, built so residents could walk to schools, shops, and parks. Greendale was intended to be a model village for the working class. Income limits were from $1200 to $2700 per year, depending upon family size. In 1938, a one-bedroom Original rented for $19 a month. Rent for a four-bedroom home was $46 a month. Over 200 of the "Originals" have unique artistic designs on the chimneys.

Federal ownership of Greendale ended in 1953. In the late 1950s Greendale experienced growth in conjunction with the expansion of the Milwaukee suburbs as a whole. Although new homes were built and the number of minority families increased in Milwaukee County, racially restrictive covenants were used to maintain the all-white Greendale community. In 1958, the Crestview Acres land was sold by Elroy H. Barbian for development with the restrictive covenant that only white families could purchase the homes. "No Persons other than the white race shall own or occupy any building on said tract, but this covenant shall not prevent occupancy of persons of a race other than the white race who are domestic servants of the owner or occupant of said building."

Southridge Mall opened in 1970 as the southern sister mall to Northridge Mall. Both malls were located on 76th Street, close to major east–west artery roads. Both were developed by Herb Kohl and Taubman Centers, Inc.

In 1996, the shopping district in the center of the village was purchased by the Grandhaven investment firm founded by Roy Reiman, founder of a publishing company headquartered in the village. The remake of the "Village Center" brought updates, attracted new restaurants, and made the village center more of a tourist attraction. More than 40,000 flowers are planted annually along the downtown streets in hanging baskets, sidewalk beds, and storefront window boxes.

To ease managing more than 2,000 men during Greendale's construction, workers were directed to the "A section", the "B section", the "C section", etc. This alphabetical reference has endured. Still today, all streets in each section begin with the same letter — the A section includes Angle Lane, Apricot Court, etc.

== Geography ==
Greendale is located at 42°56′15″N 87°59′49″W (42.937615, −87.996884). The Root River flows through the western part of the village.

Greendale is bordered by the city of Greenfield to the north and east, the village of Hales Corners to the west, and the city of Franklin to the south.[7]

According to the United States Census Bureau, the village has a total area of 5.57 square miles (14.43 km^{2}), of which 5.56 square miles (14.40 km^{2}) is land and 0.01 square miles (0.03 km^{2}) is water.

Scout Lake is a five-acre lake located in Greendale. It has a maximum depth of 19 feet. Fish include panfish, largemouth bass and northern pike.

=== Climate ===
Greendale, Wisconsin

Climate chart (precipitation, max. and min. temperature)
J	F	M	A	M	J	J	A	S	O	N	D
97 −6 −12	101 −3 −11	68 6 −6	165 17 2	111 20 5	138 29 12	100 28 16	95 26 13	67 23 11	92 15 6	64 7 −2	78 −3 −8
- █ Average max. and min. temperatures in °C
- █ Precipitation totals in mm
Imperial conversion
J	F	M	A	M	J	J	A	S	O	N	D
3.8 21 10	4 27 12	2.7 43 21	6.5 63 36	4.4 68 41	5.4 84 54	3.9 82 61	3.7 79 55	2.6 73 52	3.6 59 43	2.5 45 28	3.1 27 18
- █ Average max. and min. temperatures in °F
- █ Precipitation totals in inches

Greendale weather by month

Greendale is in zone 5b of the USDA Plant Hardiness Zone Map.

== Demographics ==
Historical population
Census	Pop.	Note	%±
1940	2,527		—
1950	2,752		8.9%
1960	6,845		148.7%
1970	15,089		120.4%
1980	16,928		12.2%
1990	15,128		−10.6%
2000	14,405		−4.8%
2010	14,046		−2.5%
2020	14,854		5.8%
2021 (est.)	14,652	▼	−1.4%
U.S. Decennial Census

=== 2020 census ===
As of the 2020 census, Greendale had a population of 14,854. The median age was 43.1 years. 22.6% of residents were under the age of 18 and 23.8% of residents were 65 years of age or older. For every 100 females there were 89.0 males, and for every 100 females age 18 and over there were 84.0 males age 18 and over. The gender makeup was 48.5% male and 51.5% female.

The population density was 2,541.42 inhabitants per square mile (981.2/km^{2}). 100.0% of residents lived in urban areas, while 0.0% lived in rural areas.

There were 6,121 households in Greendale, of which 30.9% had children under the age of 18 living in them. Of all households, 50.7% were married-couple households, 14.9% were households with a male householder and no spouse or partner present, and 29.0% were households with a female householder and no spouse or partner present. About 29.7% of all households were made up of individuals and 16.4% had someone living alone who was 65 years of age or older.

There were 6,330 housing units at an average density of 1,136.4 per square mile (438.8/km^{2}), of which 3.3% were vacant. The homeowner vacancy rate was 0.8% and the rental vacancy rate was 3.0%.

Racial composition as of the 2020 census
Race	Number	Percent
White	12,592	84.8%
Black or African American	239	1.6%
American Indian and Alaska Native	68	0.5%
Asian	632	4.3%
Native Hawaiian and Other Pacific Islander	9	0.1%
Some other race	329	2.2%
Two or more races	985	6.6%
Hispanic or Latino (of any race)	1,157	7.8%

=== 2010 census ===
As of the census of 2010, there were 14,046 people, 6,075 households, and 4,016 families residing in the village. The population density was 2,526.3 inhabitants per square mile (975.4/km^{2}). There were 6,294 housing units at an average density of 1,132.0 per square mile (437.1/km^{2}). The racial makeup of the village was 92.8% White, 1.2% African American, 0.4% Native American, 3.1% Asian, 0.9% from other races, and 1.6% from two or more races. Hispanic or Latino of any race were 4.7% of the population.

There were 6,075 households, of which 28.0% had children under the age of 18 living with them, 52.5% were married couples living together, 10.0% had a female householder with no husband present, 3.6% had a male householder with no wife present, and 33.9% were non-families. 30.1% of all households were made up of individuals, and 17% had someone living alone who was 65 years of age or older. The average household size was 2.31 and the average family size was 2.87.

The median age in the village was 45.3 years. 22.1% of residents were under the age of 18; 5.6% were between the ages of 18 and 24; 21.7% were from 25 to 44; 28.2% were from 45 to 64; and 22.2% were 65 years of age or older. The gender makeup of the village was 46.6% male and 53.4% female.

=== Demographic estimates ===
According to Census Bureau profile data, 47.0% of residents had a bachelor's degree or higher, the median household income was $78,310, 10.2% of residents were foreign-born, and the average family size was 2.96.

== Economy ==
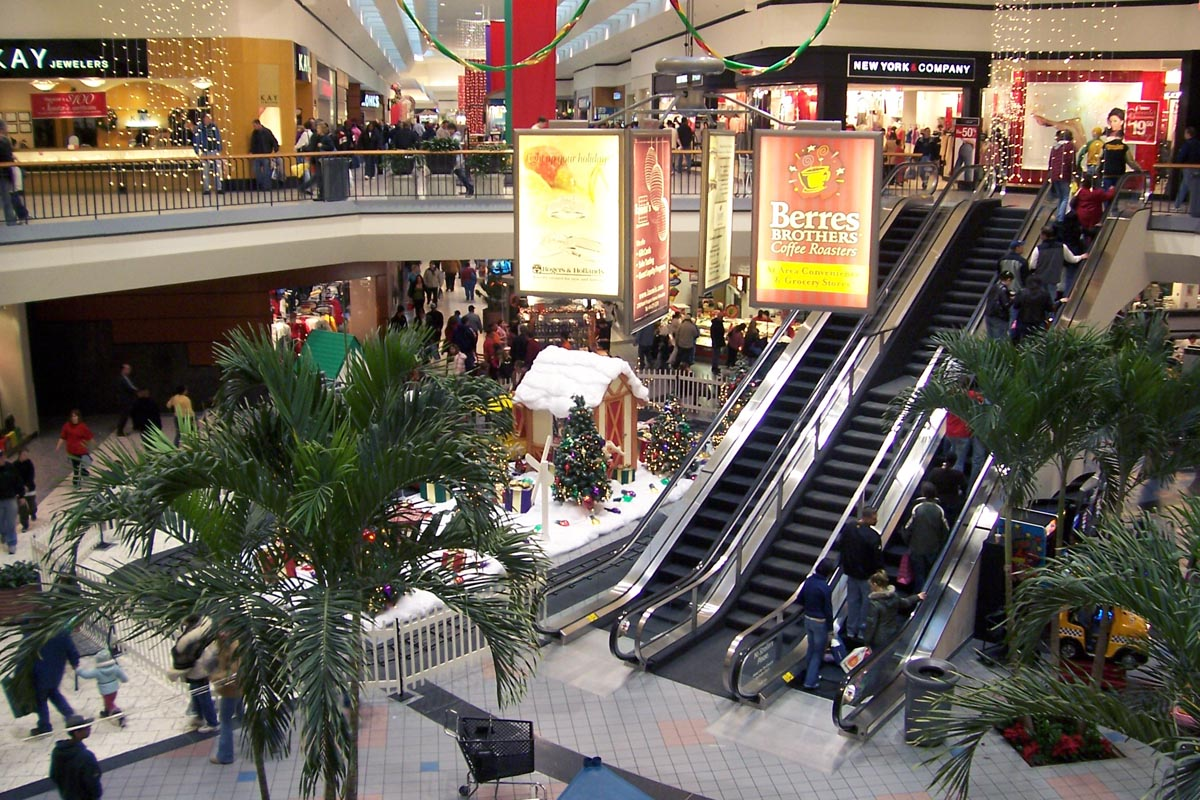
Southridge Mall

Southridge Mall, is located in Greendale, and opened in 1970. It is Wisconsin's second largest mall behind Mayfair Mall in Wauwatosa, tied with Fox River Mall in Appleton. The downtown village center has more than a dozen independent shops and nine places to eat.

== Arts and culture ==
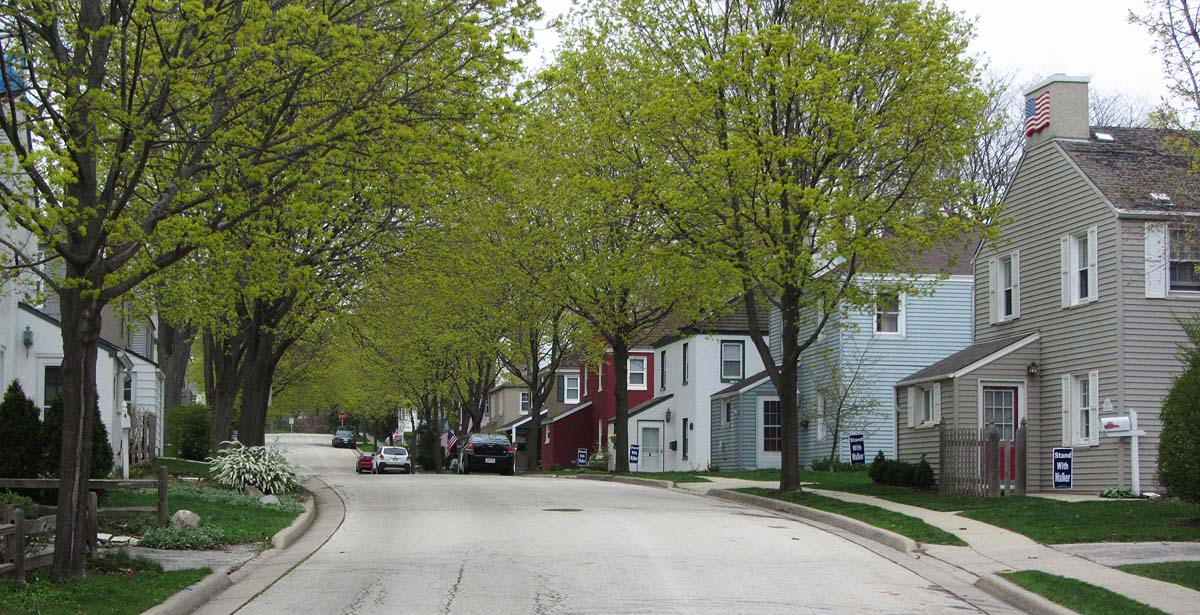
Greendale Historic District

=== Civic organizations ===
Community members are active in many local civic organizations, church groups and school committees where they volunteer their time and talents for the betterment of the Village.

- Greendale Entertainment Association
- Greendale Historical Society
- Greendale Lions Club
- Public Celebrations Committee

=== Events and festivals ===
- "Remember the Fallen", a solemn remembrance walk on Memorial Day, ending at the Greendale Veteran's Memorial.
- Greendale Downtown Market, running on Saturdays from June through the first weekend in October. Sponsored by the Greendale Park and Recreation Department.
- Saturday Night Fun on the Green. Free music concerts every Saturday night from mid-June to mid-August in Gazebo Park. Sponsored by the Greendale Entertainment Association.
- Sunday Village Nites on the Green. Free music concerts every Sunday night from mid-June to mid-August in Gazebo Park. Sponsored by the Greendale Park and Recreation Department.
- Family Fourth Fest. Two music stages in Gazebo Park. Sponsored by the Greendale Lions Club.
- Greendale Garden Walk, a free walking tour through private gardens in Greendale, on the second Saturday in July.
- Every August, Greendale celebrates Village Days, an annual event since 1939. The three-day celebration commemorates the history of the village, attracting thousands to live music, food and drink at the Greendale Entertainment Association's stage.
- Public Celebrations Calendar of Events in Greendale

=== Historic places ===
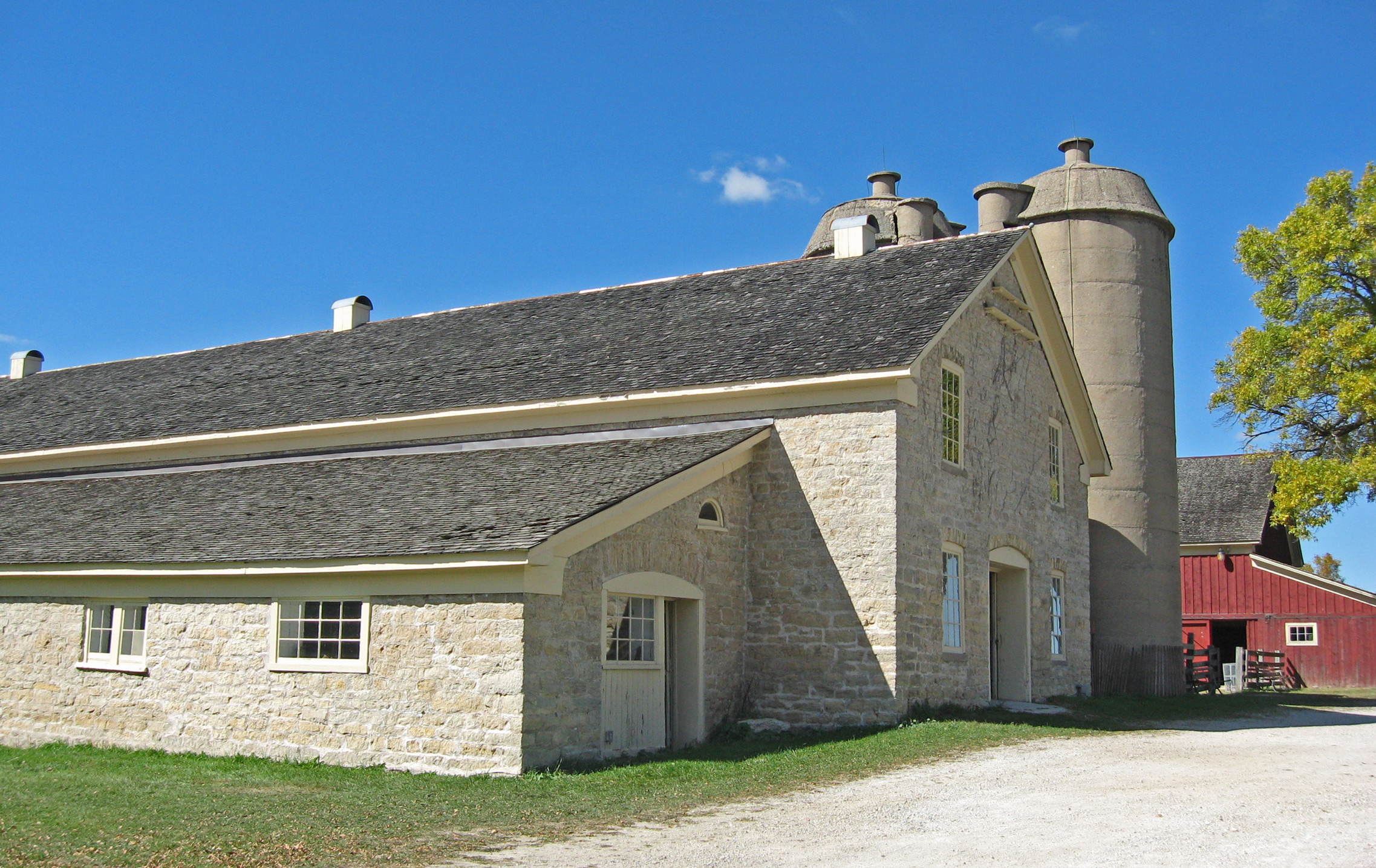
Trimborn Farm

- The Greendale Historic District was added to the National Register of Historic Places in 2005 and designated a National Historic Landmark in 2012.
- Trimborn Farm, is a Victorian era estate, and added to the National Register of Historic Places in 1980.
- Part of the Trimborn farm complex is the neighboring Jeremiah Curtin House, built in 1846, which is a unique stone house that was the boyhood home of noted American linguist and folklorist Jeremiah Curtin.

=== Performing arts ===
- Greendale Community Theater,
- Greendale High School. Fall play, winter musical, and spring musical.
- Midwest Vocal Express (MVE), a male a cappella chorus specializes in "Storytelling through Song," performing traditional barbershop favorites, show tunes, spirituals, popular music. Founded in 1989.

=== Points of interest ===
- Greendale Public Library Member of the Milwaukee County Federated Library System. 6,533 residents have a Library card. 131,113 physical items were checked out in 2021. 24,276 eBooks, eMagazines, eAudio uses in 2021. The library is noted for its collection of all 322 covers for The Saturday Evening Post that Norman Rockwell illustrated over the course of his career.
- Greendale Veterans Memorial, honors those Veterans who have sacrificed so much in the defense of our country. Dedication ceremony was held on October 5, 2019.
- Historic Greendale Welcome Center, has displays of Greendale's history, showing the early creation of Greendale, Greendale's progression through the years, and Greendale today.
- Historic Hose Tower. A hose tower is a structure constructed for hanging firehoses to dry.

== Parks and recreation ==
The Greendale Park and Recreation Department maintains 7 parks within the village. Amenities include ballfields, playgrounds, soccer fields, basketball hoops, and tennis courts.

- 84th & Grange
- College Park
- Community Center Park
- Dale Creek Parkway
- Gazebo Park
- Lions Park
- Jaycee Park

Whitnall Park, the largest park in Milwaukee County. borders Greendale on the western boundary of the village. Whitnall Park offers many recreation options including:

- Whitnall Park Golf Course, an 18-hole golf course. Designed by George Hansen, and opened in 1932, this championship golf course is heavily wooded & offers views of Mallard Lake.
- Wehr Nature Center
- Boerner Botanical Gardens
- many hiking, biking and cross-country ski trails,

Part of the Root River Parkway is in Greendale. The Village is also connected to the Milwaukee County Park System Oak Leaf Trail, a paved 135-mile (217 km) multi-use recreational trail system, which provides opportunities for walking, running or biking.

The Rock Sports Complex, an athletic park in Franklin, Wisconsin, comprising baseball fields, mountain bike & BMX trails & snow play areas, borders Greendale on the southern boundary of the village.

== Government ==
Greendale is divided into 11 wards. It is in the 11th Milwaukee County Supervisor District. At the state level, Greendale is in the 28th State Senate District, the 82nd State Assembly District and the 84th State Assembly District. Greendale is represented in the United States Senate by Senators Ron Johnson (R) and Tammy Baldwin (D) and falls within Wisconsin's 1st congressional district, which is represented by Bryan Steil (R).

== Education ==
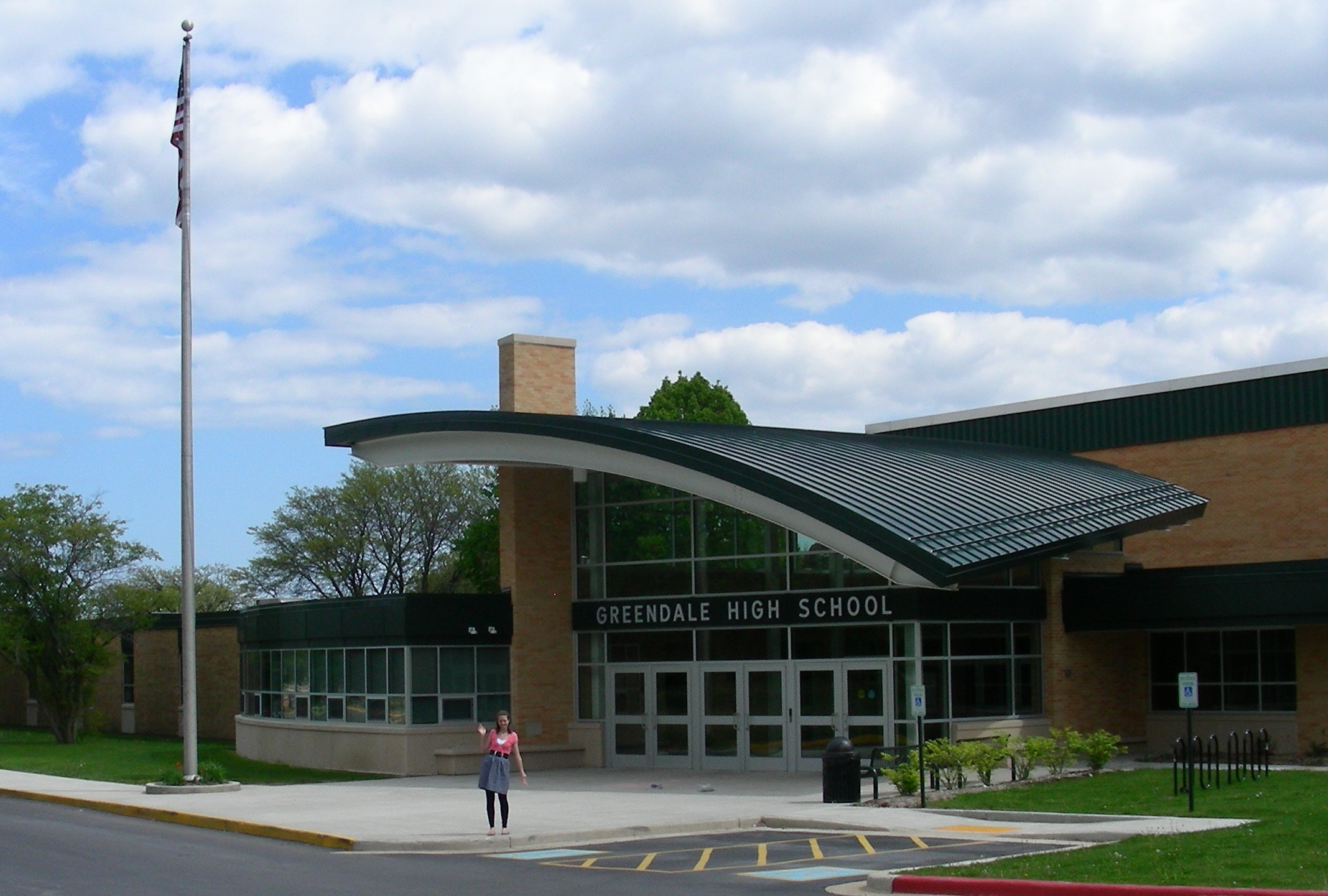
Greendale High School

The village has one public high school, one public middle school, and three public elementary schools (Canterbury, College Park, and Highland View). Greendale High School was named by Newsweek as one of America's Best High Schools in its 2009 & 2010 rankings. In 2007, the Greendale School District was ranked by Milwaukee Magazine as the top school system among the Milwaukee metropolitan area.

The Greendale High School Marching Band is a 22-time (21 consecutive) WSMA (Wisconsin School Music Association) state marching band champion, and a regular Bands of America Grand Nationals participant. The Greendale High School Marching Band was invited to appear in the 2020 and 2026 Tournament of Roses Parade on January 1, 2026. The band performed in the Macy's Thanksgiving Day Parade in 2016 and 2023.

=== Private Schools ===
- Greendale Baptist Academy.
- Greendale Playschool, 3K and 4K.
- Martin Luther High School is a private high school in the village.
- St. Alphonsus Catholic School, 3K through grade 8.

== Transportation ==
Greendale is six miles (9.6 km) from Milwaukee Mitchell International Airport, and close to Interstate 94 and Interstate 894. Running through the village is WIS 36. The village is served by multiple transit lines with the Milwaukee County Transit System.

== Notable people ==
- Stephen Burrows, comedic storyteller, writer, director, actor
- Jeremiah Curtin, 19th-century folklorist and linguist who lived in what is now Greendale. His boyhood home is a historic landmark.
- Luke Eisner, actor, singer, and songwriter
- Jim Frohna, cinematographer and director, born and raised in Greendale
- Jim Gruenwald, Greco-Roman wrestler, former U.S. Olympic team member.
- Ariana Hilborn, long-distance runner born in Greendale
- Jane Kaczmarek, actress born and raised in Greendale
- Mark Massa, Indiana Supreme Court justice
- Roy Reiman, founder of Reiman Publications
- Dave Smith, American Football League player
- Gerald Uelmen, attorney, writer, civil servant, and academic

== See also ==
- List of villages in Wisconsin
