= Northridge Mall (Wisconsin) =

Former shopping mall in Milwaukee, Wisconsin, U.S.

- Location: Milwaukee, Wisconsin, United States
- Coordinates: 43°10′56″N 088°0′36″W
- Address: 7700 West Brown Deer Rd.
- Opened: August 2, 1972
- Closed: 2002 (Indoor mall) 2003 (last anchor tenant)
- Developer: Taubman Centers, Inc.
- Owner: The City of Milwaukee
- Num. of stores: 200
- Num. of anchor tenants: 4
- Floor area: 1,100,000 square feet (100,000 m^{2})
- Floors: 2
- Public transit: Milwaukee County Transit System

Northridge Mall was a shopping mall located in the northern part of Milwaukee, Wisconsin that first opened in August 1972. It was developed by Taubman Centers. The mall's original anchor stores were JCPenney, Sears, Boston Store, and Gimbels. Gimbels was sold to Marshall Field's, then H. C. Prange Co., and finally Younkers. The mall underwent a period of decline and was shuttered in 2003, and remained vacant until it was demolished in 2025.

== History ==
=== Opening and initial success ===
The grand opening occurred on August 2, 1972, two years after its sister mall, Southridge Mall, opened in 1970. Both were financed and owned by Senator Herb Kohl and part of the Taubman Centers. Northridge Mall was co-developed with the nearby Northridge Lakes development, a residential development consisting of a mix of inventive multi-family residences, in concert with a planned northern beltline freeway which would have connected the area to the rest of the Milwaukee area. The pioneering mall was planned and designed as a regional center, consisting of a two-level mall with four anchors: JCPenney, Sears, Boston Store, and Gimbels, along with a United Artists Theatres triplex (eventually expanded to six screens). Marshall Field's and Gimbel's shared the same parent company, BATUS. As Gimbel's was winding down their business operations, BATUS transferred five former Gimbel's locations to Marshall Field's. Fields operated the store very briefly. In 1989, Marshall Field's sold this location as well as the Southridge Mall store to Prange's Prange's would be acquired by Younkers in 1992. Younkers closed in 2000.

The mall declined within the decade after, as the freeway revolts of the 1970s ended up cancelling the north freeway intended to complete the Milwaukee beltline, leaving those intending to go to Northridge on miles of the surface street Brown Deer Road from Interstate 43 and U.S. 41/45 to access the mall; other closer shopping options had been developed in the ensuing decades along the completed freeways in formerly rural areas, and the Brown Deer strip in each direction from the mall had developed a number of disparate and cluttered retail developments with very little continuity or theming. Crime around the general area also increased to a smaller extent, but alarmism of those crimes in what was a suburban area in the local media, along with the lingering effects of the Anderson case despite its resolution, decreased the mall's clientele, as suburban shoppers chose other options with easy freeway access such as Mayfair, Brookfield Square, and newly developed power center shopping options in Mequon, Menomonee Falls, and Grafton. The final blow to the mall was the early 2000s recession, which saw a number of tenants pull out after their lease expirations and the mall's owner unable to find new ones outside of local small businesses. The mall eventually closed in 2003.

The Northridge Lakes development also ran into complexities involving the local real estate market, which preferred single-family detached homes over apartment developments, forcing its ownership to lower their rents and take in a more traditional apartment clientele than the high-end market it intended to market to.

=== Abandonment and demolition ===
The former Sears store and that section of the mall was then demolished, and a Menards home improvement store and Pick 'n Save supermarket occupied the site. Also, a Value City furniture store moved into a portion of the old Boston Store building but closed in May 2009. The rest of the mall remained vacant.

As of August 2013, William Penzey of Penzeys Spices had announced plans to purchase the mall for use in Penzeys Spices operations. In April 2014, the Chinese investment company which purchased the mall, U.S. Black Spruce Enterprise Group, retained ownership by making a last minute payment halting a foreclosure auction that might have allowed Penzeys Spices to take ownership of the property. That ownership had alleged plans for a large-scale Asian marketplace mall and office complex, but outside of generic architectural renderings of the concept, no plans or permit approvals have been advanced to Milwaukee's city council, and the city has been purposefully obstructed from overall communication by Black Spruce, outside of refusals to cooperate with any alternate plans for the building and payments to avoid the city taking eminent domain over the property. The proposal is also improperly marketed for the metro's population, whose majority Asian population is Hmong Americans and Indian Americans.

In September 2014, Pick 'n Save announced it would be closing its store at Northridge Mall. After the Pick n Save closed, only a Menards store remained at the site.

In 2018, the mall was rented out to MIR Tactical, an airsoft store and event promoter, to host an airsoft game called the "Milwaukee Offensive".

On April 11, 2019, the City of Milwaukee issued a demolition order for the mall. On the evening of July 22, 2019, a maintenance contractor was fatally electrocuted while investigating an open fuse box at the mall.

A demolition order for the mall was approved by a judge of the Milwaukee County Circuit Court on May 13, 2020, who ruled that the mall was dangerous. City officials have claimed that Black Spruce pays owed back taxes only when the city begins to take action against Black Spruce.

In the summer of 2022, a rash of four arson fires occurred around the mall, with Black Spruce only securing holes in the roof with common drywall, a situation that has Aaron Lipski, Milwaukee's fire chief, fearing for the lives of his firefighters, as the mall has no working fire suppression or prevention systems, and the building's breadth requires all battalions on the city's northwest side to respond, putting the rest of the community at risk. Following the fires, Milwaukee County Judge William Sosnay found Black Spruce in contempt of court and ordered Black Spruce to secure the property or face a fine of $2,000 a day. As of September 2, 2022, Black Spruce faces at least $26,000 in fines. The city of Milwaukee sought to take over the mall in January 2023 so it could demolish it. After development group Phoenix Investors made a bid for the mall in March 2023, a judge rejected Milwaukee officials' request to take over the mall the next month.

On December 8, 2023, Governor Tony Evers granted the City of Milwaukee $15 million to demolish the mall. Starting on January 31, 2024, the old Boston Store portion of the mall began demolition which had previously undergone asbestos removal that was completed in 2021. The grant also required demolition of the rest of the mall to begin by the end of 2025. Through a long court battle, the City of Milwaukee was able to obtain the portion of Northridge Mall that was still owned by Black Spruce. As of January 2025, the former Younkers had been demolished, and work had begun to bring down the former JCPenney. The mall's demolition was completed in September 2025.

== Future ==
As of 2026, the 58 acres (23 ha) of land the mall occupied remained vacant. Affordable housing was planned to be built on the site and was currently under development.
