= Trimborn Farm =

- U.S. National Register of Historic Places
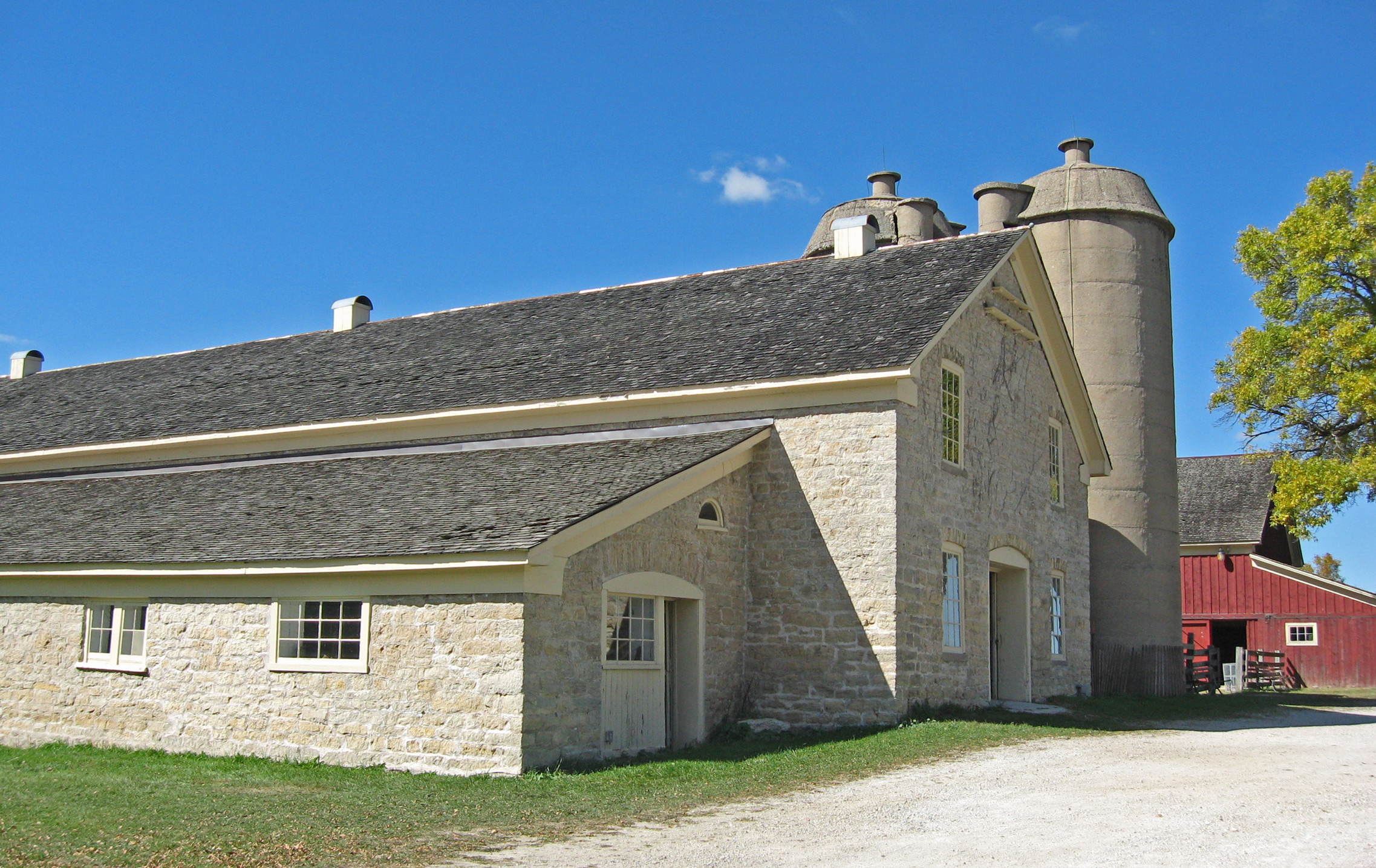
- Trimborn limestone barn
- Location: Greendale, Wisconsin
- Coordinates: 42°56′39.37″N 88°1′26.28″W
- Built: 1846
- Architectural style: Greek Revival
- NRHP reference No.: 80000170
- Added to NRHP: 1980-07-31

Trimborn Farm is a Victorian era estate located in Greendale, Wisconsin, United States, and owned by Milwaukee County. Spanning 7.5 acres (3.0 hectares) and nine buildings, it is listed on the National Register of Historic Places. The farm is also a State Historic Site and designated Milwaukee County Landmark.

== History ==
Around 1846 Jeremiah O'Donnell built lime kilns at the farm. In 1851, Werner Trimborn and Jacob Kier purchased O'Donnell's lime-production business which covered ten acres (4.0 hectares) on site. Kier left soon after, but Werner and his family continued on to become one of the largest producers of high quality lime in Wisconsin. At its height in the 1870s, the business held over 500 acres (2.0 km^{2}; 200 ha) of land and employed nearly 40 people.

With the 1900s came a drastic change in building materials, including the introduction of Portland cement. The estate was soon subdivided and sold off, with much of it going to the Theodore Vollmer family for use in dairy farming.

In 1919, the Froemming family purchased a large tract of land to build greenhouses on, a portion of which was later donated to Whitnall Park.

In 1935, the farm, along with 3,400 acres (14 km^{2}; 1,400 ha) of surrounding land, was purchased by the federal government as part of a planned agricultural community known as the Greendale Project. It is now the village of Greendale, Wisconsin.

After the Great Depression, the remaining farmland passed into private ownership, where it became home to crop dusters and a riding stable.

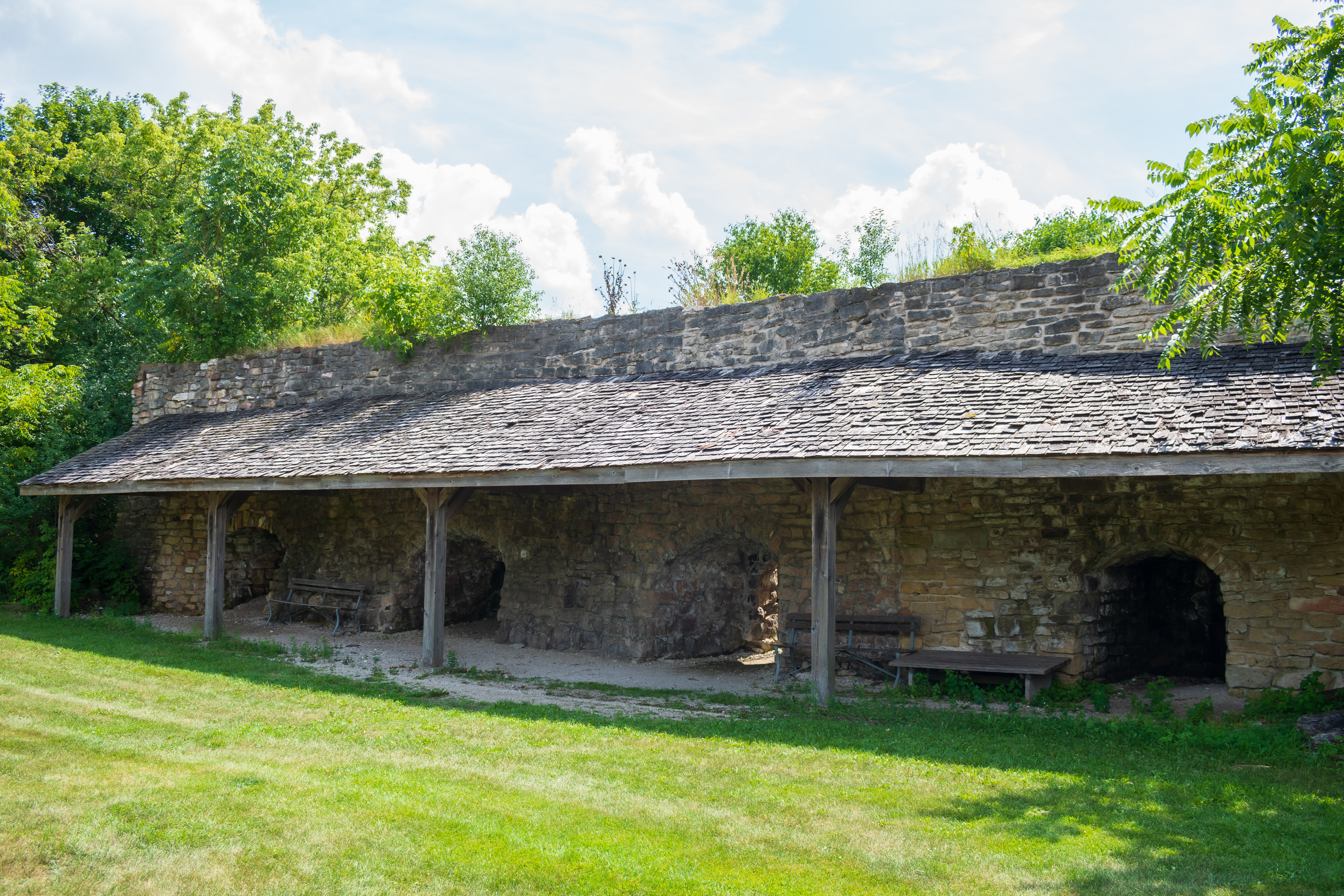
Lime kilns at Trimborn Farm, 2022

== Attractions ==
The nine historic buildings and land which remain are part of the Milwaukee County Parks System. With the assistance of the Milwaukee County Historical Society, a variety of community events and activities are scheduled year-round.

Property highlights include:

- Farmhouse — Constructed in Greek Revival style during the 1850s using Cream City brick, a distinctive, light-colored brick made locally.
- Granary — Built in the 1850s using a technique on the interior called brick noggin to protect against air infiltration. This building functioned as a bunkhouse and granary.
- Lime Kilns — In the 1840s and 1850s four lime kilns were constructed to heat limestone taken from the nearby quarry and turn it in to lime powder.
- Stone Barn — Beginning in 1858 it was built in three phases, using limestone from the quarry. Two concrete silos were added in 1920.
- Threshing Barn — Built in 1858, using vertical board and batten siding. The barn was used to store grain and house animals.

Also part of the farm complex is the neighboring Jeremiah Curtin House, built in 1846, which is a unique stone house that was the boyhood home of noted American linguist and folklorist Jeremiah Curtin; it was later sold to the Trimborn family.
