= Greendale Historic District =

Historic district in Wisconsin, United States

- U.S. National Register of Historic Places
- U.S. National Historic Landmark District
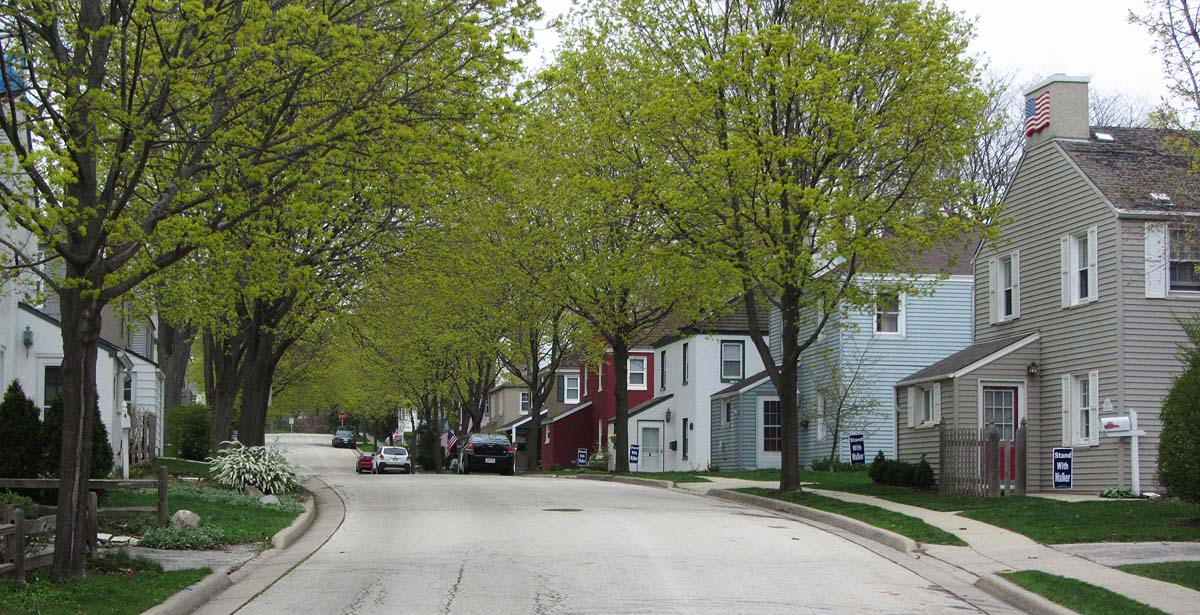
- Greendale Historic District

- Location within Wisconsin Location within the United States
- Location: Greendale, Wisconsin
- Coordinates: 42°56′29″N 87°59′45″W
- Architect: Harry Bentley/Walter Thomas
- NRHP reference No.: 05000763

Significant dates
- Added to NRHP: July 29, 2005
- Designated NHLD: October 16, 2012

The Greendale Historic District is a National Historic Landmark District encompassing the historic core of the village of Greendale, Wisconsin. The village core was designed in the 1930s as part of a New Deal program to establish so-called "greenbelt towns" as model suburbs, and is one of three such communities built by the federal government. It was added to the National Register of Historic Places in 2005 and designated as a National Historic Landmark in 2012.

== History ==
After the Wall Street Crash of 1929, the U.S. economy sputtered and many jobs were lost as the world slipped into the Great Depression. By 1933 14 million Americans were out of work. 273,000 homes were foreclosed on that year, and housing construction fell to 10% of what it had been in 1925. Lacking affordable housing, many people crowded into city slums.

Franklin D. Roosevelt's administration, inaugurated in 1933, had pledged economic recovery. To deliver his New Deal, Roosevelt had to try new things, and one of the ideas considered was the 'greenbelt towns' program. The idea was presented to Roosevelt by Undersecretary of Agriculture Rexford Tugwell. Based on the garden city movement in England, the goal was to build new towns outside of population centers and aid the housing market by building new houses and slowing down the expansion of urban slums. Tugwell later explained: "My idea [was] to go just outside centers of population, pick up cheap land, build a whole community, and entice people into it. Then go back into the cities and tear down whole slums and make parks of them."

One hundred major cities were studied as potential candidates to be the population center to have new town constructed near-by. Milwaukee, Wisconsin was chosen for its varied and stable manufacturing sector, among other reasons, and Greendale was built west of the city. During its construction, First Lady Eleanor Roosevelt visited the project and later wrote that it had a "delightful site" and thought it was a "really good development." Then-U.S. Secretary of Agriculture and future U.S. Vice President Henry A. Wallace would also tour Greendale.

Construction ran from 1936 to 1938. 750 dwelling units were planned, but only 572 were built because of funding. About half are single-family detached houses. The other half were duplexes and row-houses up to six units.

Greendale was one of three 'greenbelt towns' built by the federal government of the United States, along with Greenbelt, Maryland outside Washington, D.C. and Greenhills, Ohio outside Cincinnati, during the Great Depression.

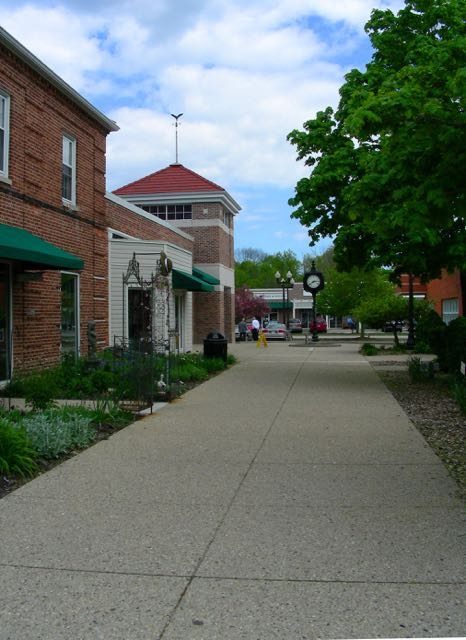
Part of the downtown, in 2010

== Description ==
Greendale is located southwest of Milwaukee, and its central core is roughly bounded by West Loomis Road, West Grange Avenue, Westway, and Southway. Its layout, as designed in the 1930s, has circulation patterns for both vehicular and non-vehicular movements, winding roads providing access to single-family and duplex homes, and a central business district that also houses municipal functions. Parks of various sizes are interspersed in the landscape. Originally three clusters of development were planned, but funding cuts meant that only one was actually built. Labor for the construction and development was funded in part by the Works Progress Administration. The principal municipal buildings of the village were designed by Walter G. Thomas in the Colonial Revival style. Utility lines were buried, and included a full complement of services: water, sewer, electricity, and telephone. Pedestrian circulation was designed so that public parks could be reached from residential areas without crossing any major roads. The residential buildings are typically two stories in height, with concrete cinder block walls finished in stucco on the outside and plaster on the inside.

== See also ==
- List of National Historic Landmarks in Wisconsin
- National Register of Historic Places listings in Milwaukee County, Wisconsin
