= Jeremiah Curtin House =

Historic house in Wisconsin, United States

- U.S. National Register of Historic Places
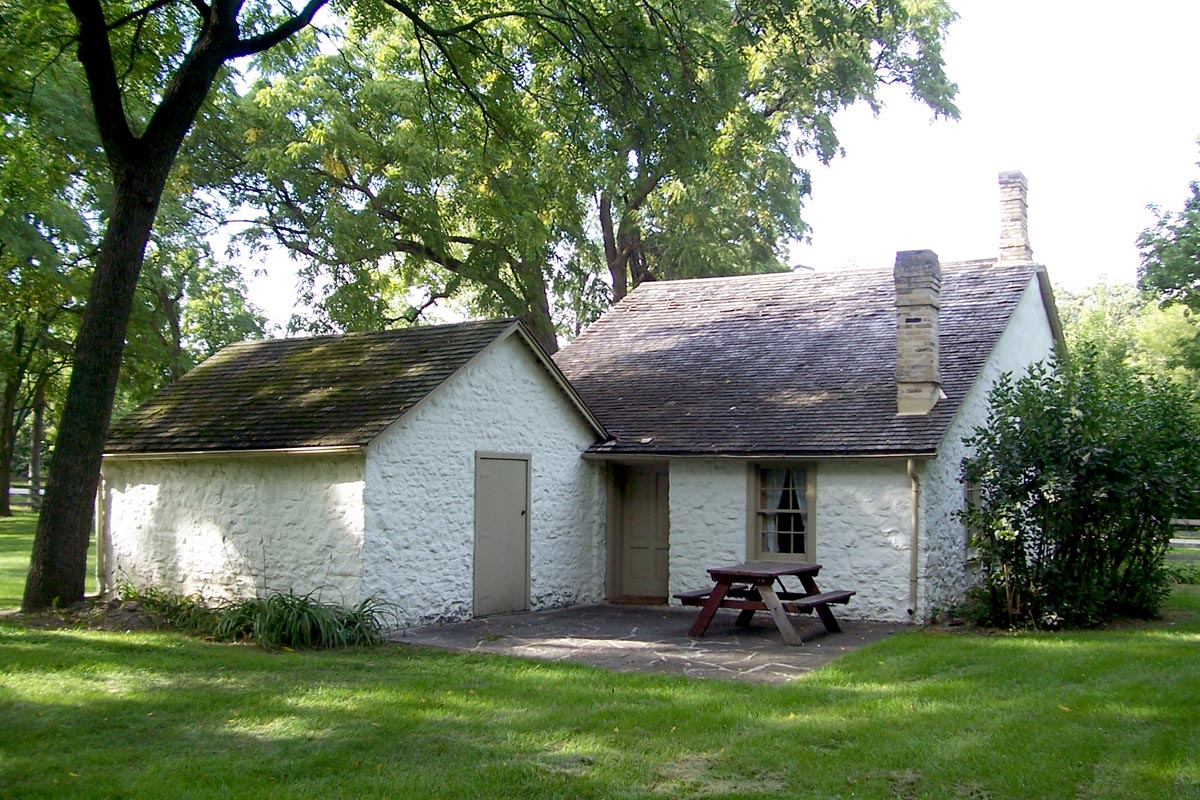
- Jeremiah Curtin House

- Location within Wisconsin Location within the United States
- Location: 8685 W. Grange Ave., Greendale, Wisconsin
- Coordinates: 42°56′40″N 88°1′19″W
- Area: 1 acre (0.40 ha)
- Built: 1846 or 1847
- NRHP reference No.: 72000060
- Added to NRHP: November 7, 1972

The Jeremiah Curtin House is a stone building built in 1846. It was the boyhood home of noted American linguist and folklorist Jeremiah Curtin (1840-1906) and is part of the Trimborn Farm estate in Greendale, Wisconsin. The house is owned by the Milwaukee County Historical Society and listed on the National Register of Historic Places.

The house is a two-story building with 18-inch (0.46 m) thick walls of Milwaukee County limestone and stucco. It is about 24.5 feet (7.5 m) by 19 feet (5.8 m) in plan. The house was restored in the 1930s in a Works Project Administration project but later was vandalized heavily. It was acquired by the Milwaukee County Historical Society in 1952.

In addition to its association with Jeremiah Curtin, it was deemed notable as it was believed to be the first stone dwelling in Greenfield Township and the oldest surviving structure in the area. It is also significant as a tangible representation of Irish immigration to the rural areas of Milwaukee County.

The NRHP nomination for the house asserts incorrectly that it was the birthplace for Jeremiah Curtin, but in fact he was born in Detroit in 1840.
