= Marshall Field's =

American department store chain

Coordinates: 41°53′02″N 87°37′38″W

Marshall Field & Company

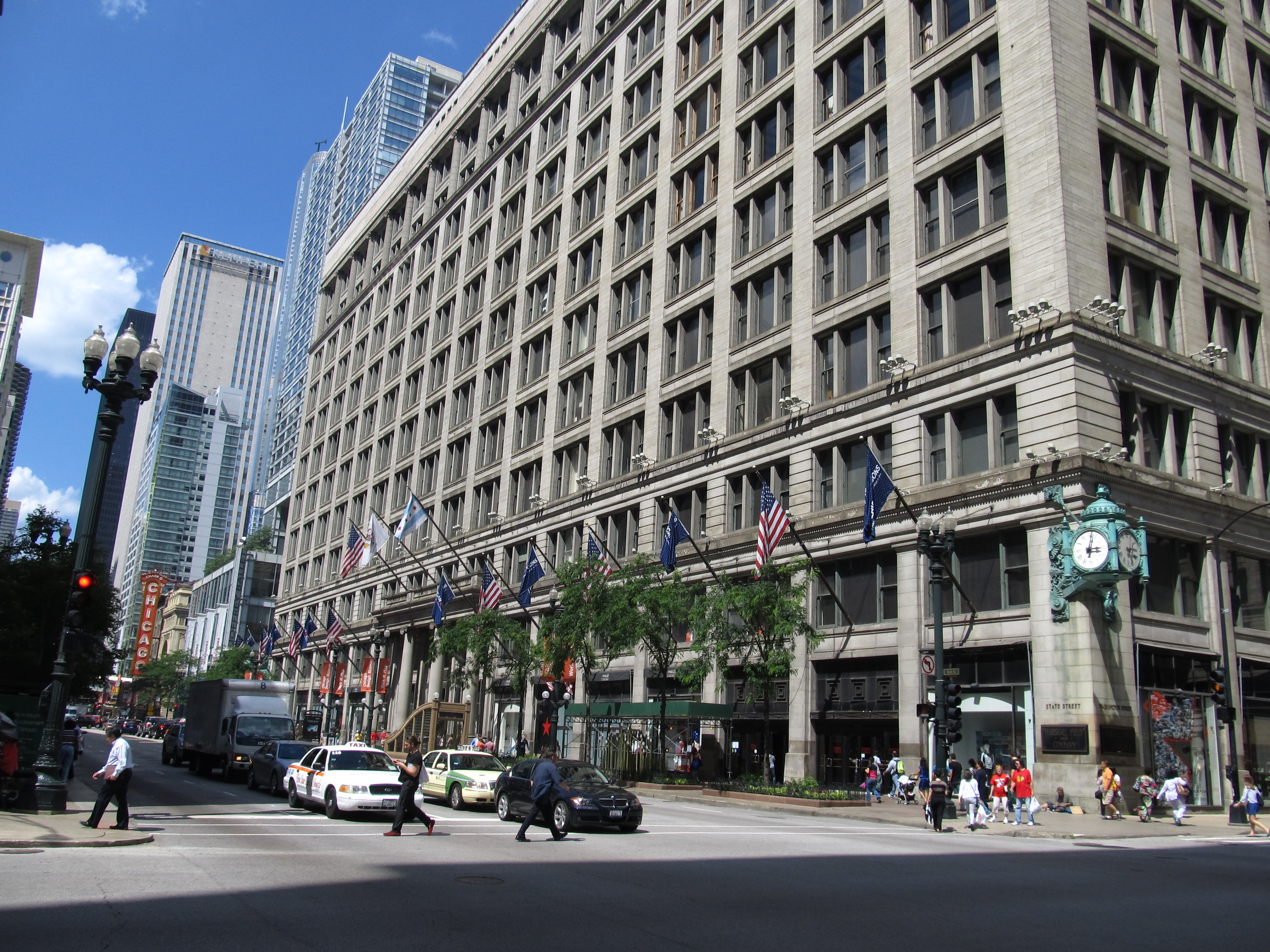
- Exterior of the Marshall Field and Company Building after conversion to Macy's (2013)
- Trade name: Marshall Field's
- Type: Subsidiary
- Industry: Retail
- Genre: Department stores
- Founded: 1852; 174 years ago in Chicago, Illinois, United States
- Founder: Potter Palmer
- Defunct: September 9, 2006; 20 years ago
- Fate: Acquisition by Federated Department Stores
- Successor: Macy's
- Headquarters: Marshall Field and Company Building, Chicago, Illinois, United States
- Key people: Marshall Field; Levi Leiter; Harry Gordon Selfridge; John G. Shedd
- Parent: Batus Inc. (1982–1990); Dayton Hudson Corporation (Note: Dayton Hudson Corporation was renamed Target Corporation in 2000.) (1990–2004); The May Department Stores Company (2004–2005); Federated Department Stores (2005–2006)
- Subsidiaries: The Crescent; Frederick & Nelson; Halle Bros.

Marshall Fields Department Store Classic Logo

Marshall Field & Company (colloquially Marshall Field's) was an American department store chain founded in 1852 by Potter Palmer. After joining the partnership in 1865, Marshall Field rose in Palmer's initial retail establishment and then developed it into a grand and innovative shopping destination in the late 1800s. It was based in Chicago, Illinois, and grew to become a large chain in the United States before Macy's, Inc. acquired it in 2005.

The company's flagship Marshall Field and Company Building on State Street in the Chicago Loop is a National Landmark for its importance in the history of retail. It became a Macy's flagship store in 2006, however, retains its historic Marshall Field's nameplates and fixtures.

== History ==
=== Early years ===
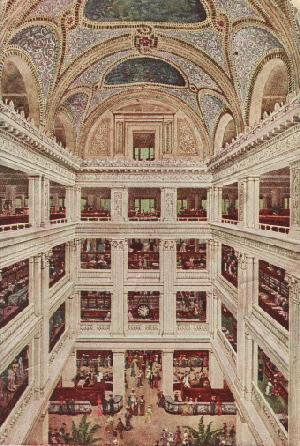
The atrium of the Marshall Fields' State Street store, nicknamed the "Great Hall", circa 1910

Marshall Field & Company traces its antecedents to the P. Palmer & Company, a dry goods store opened at 137 Lake Street in 1852 by Potter Palmer. In 1856, 21-year-old Marshall Field, from Pittsfield, Massachusetts, moved to Chicago on the southwest shores of Lake Michigan, and found work at Cooley, Wadsworth & Company, then the city's largest dry goods firm. In 1860, just before the American Civil War, Field and bookkeeper Levi Z. Leiter became junior partners in the firm, then known as Cooley, Farwell & Company. In 1864, the firm, then led by senior partner John V. Farwell, Sr., was renamed Farwell, Field & Company. only for Field and Leiter to soon withdraw from the partnership with Farwell when presented with the opportunity of a lifetime.

Potter Palmer, plagued by ailing health, was looking to dispose of his thriving business; thus, on January 4, 1865, Field and Leiter entered into partnership with Palmer and his brother Milton. The firm of P. Palmer & Company became known as Field, Palmer, Leiter & Company, with Palmer financing much of their initial capital, as well as his own contribution. After Field and Leiter's immediate success enabled them to pay him back, Palmer withdrew from the partnership in 1867 to focus on his own growing real-estate interests on one of the burgeoning city's important thoroughfares, State Street; Milton Palmer left at this time as well. The store was renamed Field, Leiter & Company, sometimes referred to as "Field & Leiter".

The buyout, however, did not bring an end to Potter Palmer's association with the firm. In 1868, he convinced Field and Leiter to lease a new, six-story edifice he had just built at the northeast corner of State and Washington Streets. The store was soon referred to as the "Marble Palace", owing to its costly marble stone face.

=== The Chicago Fire ===
When the Chicago Fire broke out on October 8, 1871, news reached company officials Henry Willing and Levi Leiter, who decided to load as much of their expensive merchandise as possible onto wagons and take it to Leiter's home, which was out of the path of the fire. The company's drivers and teams were ordered out of the barns. Horace B. Parker, a young salesman, rushed to the store's basement, broke up boxes, and built a fire in the furnace boiler so the steam-powered elevators could be operated. These employees worked feverishly through the night to move vital records and valuable goods to safety.

At one point, the gas tank exploded, which put out the store's gaslights. The men worked on by candlelight and the glow from the approaching flames. The employees got enough steam up to operate the store's powerful pumps in the basement, and volunteers went to the roof and used the store's fire hoses to wet down the roof and the wall on the side of the oncoming fire. Early the following morning, however, the city's waterworks burned, thus ending the water supply and making further efforts useless. The last employee had scarcely exited the building when it burst into flames, shooting fire from every window.

The store burned to the ground, but so much merchandise was saved that the store was able to reopen in only a few weeks (first the wholesale department on October 28, then the retail department on November 6), albeit temporarily relocated to a horse-streetcar barn of the Chicago City Railway Co. at State & 20th Streets. In April 1872, Field & Leiter reopened at a building at Madison and Market Streets (the location of present-day West Wacker Drive). Salesman Parker stayed with the company for 45 more years, rising to the level of General Sales Manager.

=== After the Great Fire ===
In October 1873, Field and Leiter returned to State Street at Washington, opening a new five-story store at their old location, which they now leased from the Singer Sewing Machine Company; Palmer had sold the land site to finance his own rebuilding activities. This store was expanded in 1876, only to be destroyed by fire again in November 1877. Ever tenacious, Field and Leiter had a new temporary store opened by the end of the month, this time at a lakefront exposition hall which they temporarily leased from the city, located at what is now the site of the Art Institute of Chicago. Meanwhile, the Singer company had speculatively built an even larger, six-story building on the ruins of their old 1873 store, which, after some contention, was personally bought by Field and Leiter. Field, Leiter & Company then reclaimed their traditional location at the northeast corner of State and Washington for the last time in April 1879.

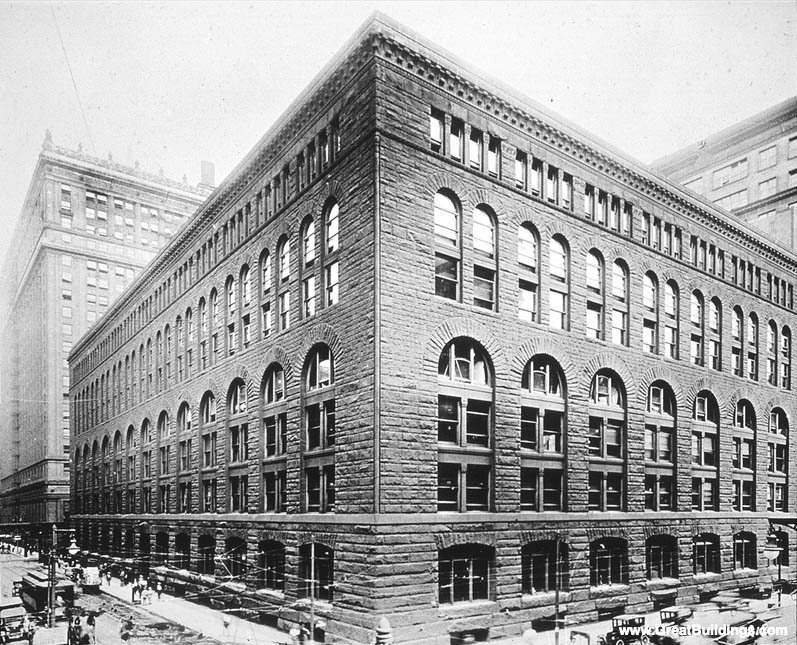
Marshall Field's Wholesale Store at Franklin Street, circa 1890

In January 1881, Field, with the support of his junior partners, bought out Levi Leiter, renaming the business Marshall Field & Company. As Palmer had before, Leiter retired to tend his significant real estate investments, which included commissioning the Second Leiter Building at State Street and Van Buren in 1891 to house Siegel, Cooper & Company. In 1932, this building (known as one of the earliest steel-framed commercial buildings built and still standing in the U.S., along with the Equitable Building in Baltimore) was leased to the later famous nationwide mail-order firm Sears, Roebuck & Company.

In 1887, the seven-story, Romanesque-styled Marshall Field's Wholesale Store, designed by Henry Hobson Richardson, opened on Franklin Street between Quincy and Adams. The wholesale division sold merchandise in bulk to smaller merchants throughout the central and western United States, and did six times the sales volume of the local retail store. Chicago's location at the nexus of the country's railroads and Great Lakes shipping made it the center of the dry goods wholesaling business by the 1870s, with Field's largest rival being John V. Farwell, Sr., his former partner from before the war. It was the scale of the profits generated by the John G. Shedd-led wholesale division that made Marshall Field the richest man in Chicago, as well as one of the richest in the country.

=== State Street store ===
Following the departure of Leiter, the retail store grew in importance. Although it remained a fraction of the size of the wholesale division, its opulent building and luxurious merchandise differentiated it from the other wholesale dry goods merchants in town. In 1887, Harry Gordon Selfridge was appointed to lead the retail store and headed it as it evolved into a modern department store. That same year, Field personally obtained Leiter's remaining interest in the 1879 Singer building and in 1888 started buying the buildings adjoining his for additional floor space.

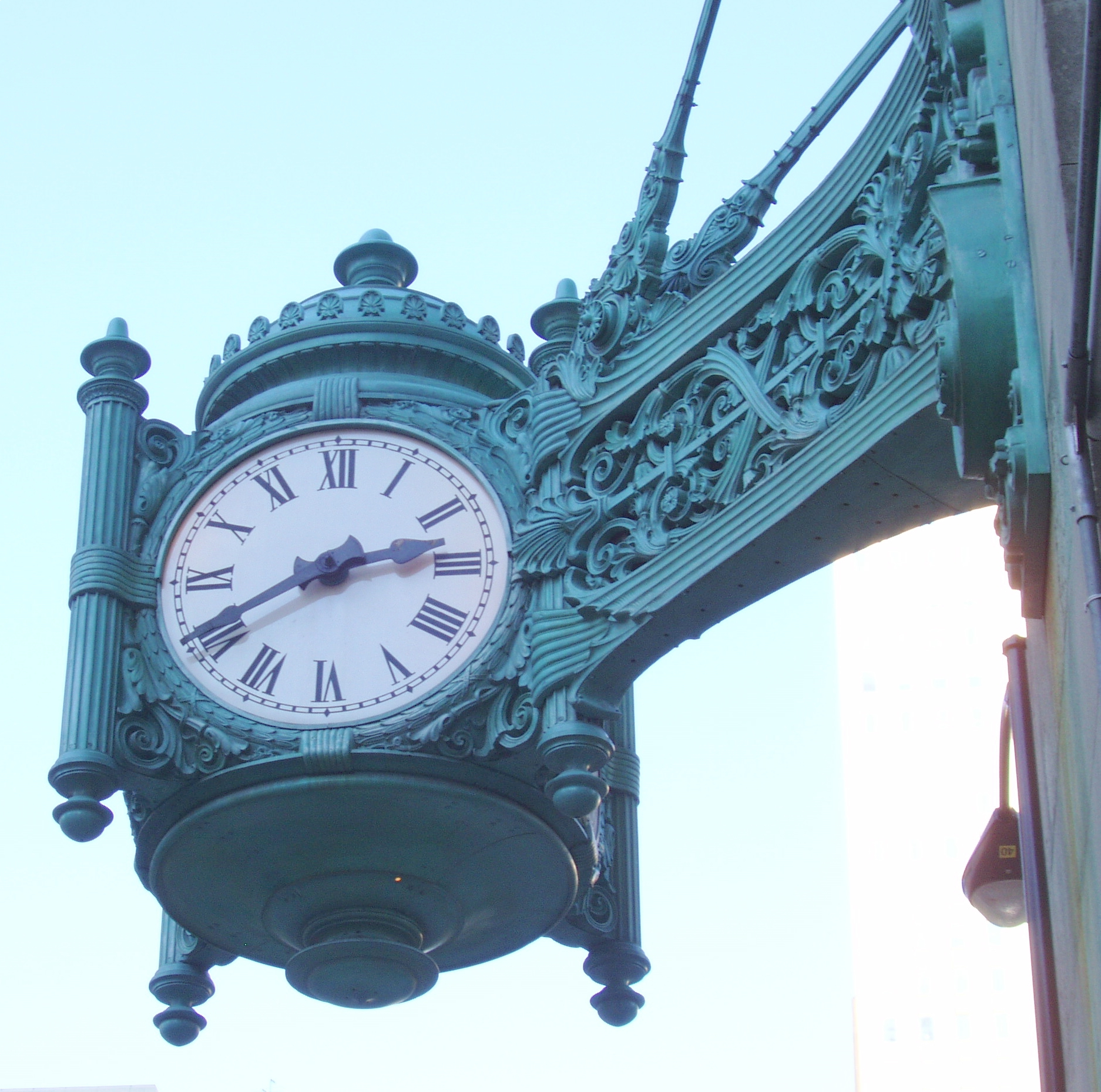
The iconic clock at Marshall Field's State Street and Washington Street store

In 1892, the structures between the building on State Street and Wabash Avenue to the east were demolished, and architect Daniel H. Burnham and his firm D.H. Burnham & Company were commissioned to erect a new building in anticipation of the influx of visitors from the World's Columbian Exposition scheduled for 1893. The nine-story "Annex" at the northwest corner of Wabash and Washington Streets opened under the direction of Burnham associate Charles B. Atwood in August 1893, towards the end of the Exposition. In 1897, the old 1879 store was rebuilt and had two additional floors added, while the first of Marshall Field's iconic Great Clocks was installed at the corner of State and Washington Streets on November 26.

In 1901, Marshall Field & Company, previously a private partnership, was incorporated. Spurred on by Selfridge, Marshall Field razed the three buildings north of it that had been occupied since 1888, as well as the Central Music Hall at the southeast corner of State and Randolph Streets.A massive, twelve-story building fronting State Street opened in their place a year later, including a grand new entrance. In 1906, a third new building opened on Wabash Avenue north of the 1893 structure, then the oldest part of the store.

In the midst of the construction, Selfridge abruptly resigned from the company in 1904, buying rival store Schlesinger & Mayer, only to sell it three months later to Carson Pirie Scott. Schlesinger & Mayer had commissioned the Louis Sullivan-designed Carson Pirie Scott Company Building (now known as the Sullivan Center) in 1899. After trying retirement, Selfridge went on to establish Selfridges in London.

=== Shedd era ===
Marshall Field died on January 16, 1906, in New York City. On the day of his funeral, all the stores along State Street, big and small, closed and the Chicago Board of Trade suspended afternoon trading in his honor. The board of Marshall Field and Company appointed John G. Shedd, whom Field had once called "the greatest merchant in the United States", to serve as the company's new president. Shedd became head of a company that employed 12,000 people in Chicago (two-thirds of them in retail) and was doing about $25 million in yearly retail sales in addition to nearly $50 million in wholesale.

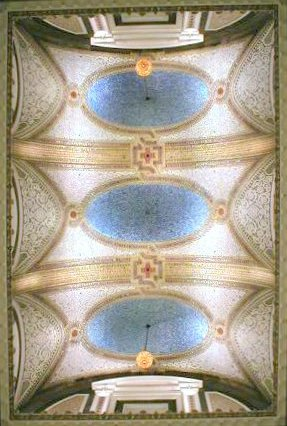
The Louis Comfort Tiffany-designed Favrile glass ceiling in the south building on State Street

Under Shedd's leadership for the next 16 years, Marshall Field & Co. continued to rebuild its store, fulfilling plans approved by Field himself to pull down the 1879 structure later in 1906. In its stead rose a new south State Street building with a continuation of the 1902 street façade. Opened in September 1907, it included a Louis Comfort Tiffany-decorated ceiling that is both the first and largest ceiling ever built in favrile glass, containing over 1.6 million pieces. With completion of the building, Marshall Field's momentarily possessed the title of "world's largest department store" over John Wanamaker & Co. in Philadelphia and R.H. Macy & Co. in New York.

In 1912, the 16-story Trude Building at the southwest corner of Wabash and Randolph was acquired and demolished, an act that was considered to be one of the first demolitions, if not the first, of a high-rise skyscraper of those just recently being built. In its place rose the 1914 building designed by Graham, Burnham & Company, completing the modern-day Marshall Field's store and now encompassing the entire square city block, bounded by Washington, State, Wabash, and Randolph Streets.

Also in 1914, Graham, Burnham & Company supervised the opening of a new twenty-story Marshall Field Annex across the street at 25 East Washington, which housed "Marshall Field's Store for Men" on its first six floors. These buildings recaptured its status as the world's largest department store, with its many restaurants and separate men's and women's lounges making it a popular social destination in upscale Chicago.

Shedd continued to expand Marshall Field's wholesale business and grew its manufacturing business, buying textile mills in the South in 1911 (see Cannon Mills Company), as well as overseeing the purchase of the Marshall Field Trust's interest in the business in 1917. The Field family eventually retained only a ten percent stake. Shedd retired in late 1922.

=== 1913 Illinois State Senate investigation ===
In 1913, representatives of Carson Pirie Scott and Marshall Field's were called to the state capital of Springfield, Illinois for the State Senate's investigation of the low wages of female employees at major department stores. At Marshall Field's, women were not only typists or other types of clerical workers, but also had a major role in the sales department. Female sales clerks were trained in etiquette and acquired a thorough understanding of the merchandise. The presence of saleswomen was a crucial part of the success of Marshall Field's, as they made female customers more comfortable and therefore made shopping at the store more enticing.

The opportunities available for women at Marshall Field's created a subculture of working women. During the early and middle decades of the 20th century, many women migrated into the labor force, often becoming adrift in a new city with new opportunities. Many of these women lived apart from family and relatives, were young and single and came from varied backgrounds and ethnicities. This subculture of women was greatly affected by wages and opportunities offered through Marshall Field's.

However, the wages of the female employees were not representative of their role in the company, and therefore became the subject of the 1913 Illinois Senate investigation. Women were paid very low wages, the average being $5 to $8 per week. The "testimony at an Illinois Senate investigation in 1913 from spokesmen for the Illinois Manufacturers' Association; banks; Sears, Roebuck; and Marshall Field's revealed that most major employers paid women workers as low as $2.75 (~$90.00 in 2025)." Even in 1913, that was not a living wage. During the hearing, Marshall Field's revealed that it could double the women's salaries, but refused to do so. Furthermore, women faced more mistreatment within the company, such as sex segregation, which limited their mobility within the company.

=== First branch stores and the Frango brand ===
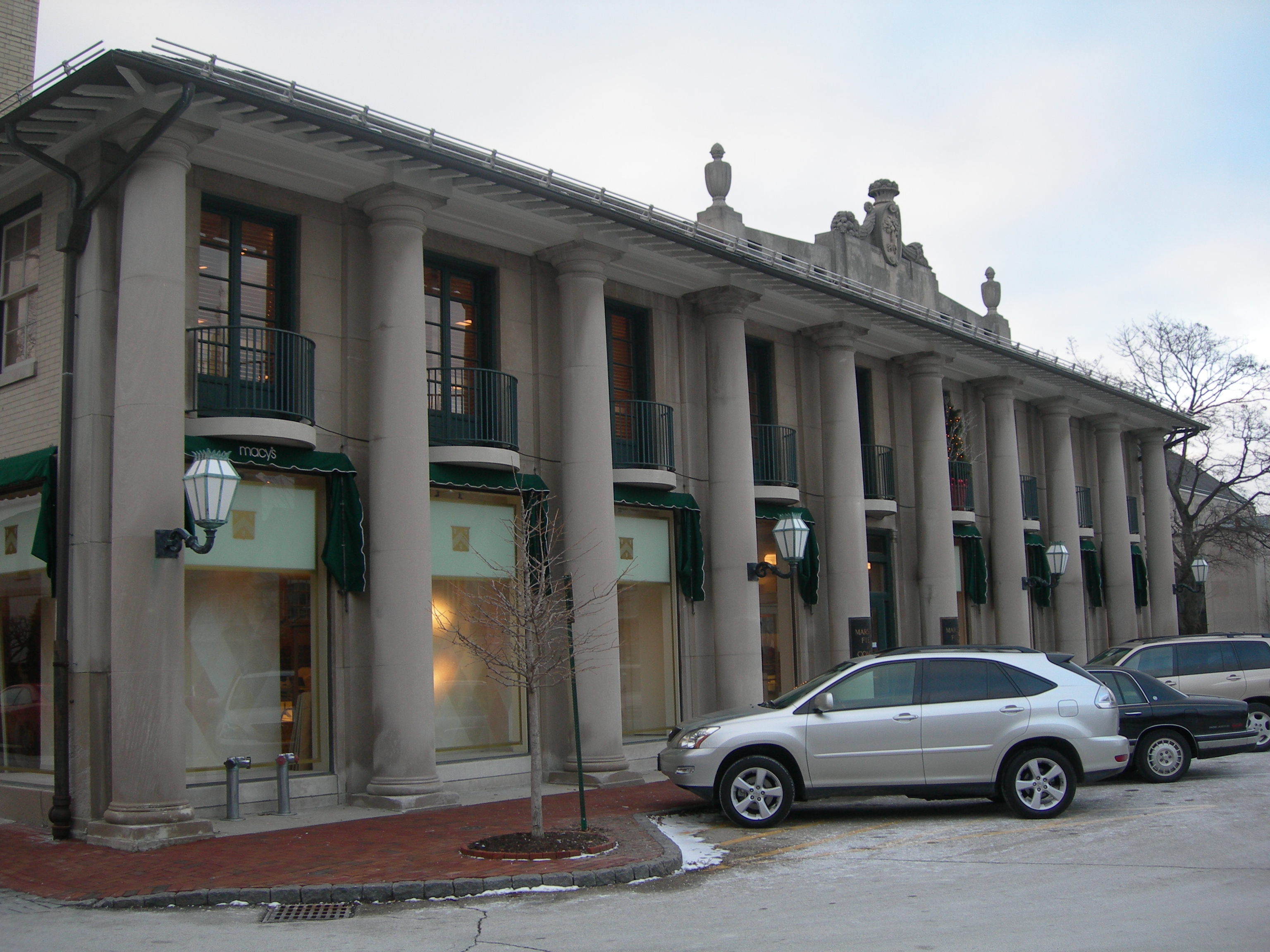
A Marshall Field's store in Lake Forest, Illinois, the last of the company's suburban stores until Macy's closed it in 2008 and was replaced with bluemercury and a few other stores

James Simpson was appointed president following John G. Shedd's retirement. Despite being considered to have favored the declining wholesale division, Simpson expanded its retail operations, first buying A. M. Rothschild & Co., which Field's operated as a discount store called "The Davis Store", in December 1923. In 1924, the 1893–1914 buildings that the store occupied were acquired from the Marshall Field Trust.

The first branch of Marshall Field's itself opened at Market Square in Lake Forest in May 1928. A location in Evanston followed in September 1928, later relocating to a French Renaissance-style building at Sherman Avenue and Church Street in November 1929. The Oak Park location opened at a building similar to the Evanston store in September 1929.

Frederick & Nelson, a Seattle, Washington-based department store founded in 1890, was also acquired by Marshall Field's in 1929, with its own 1914 downtown Seattle building at Pine Street and Fifth Avenue. Frederick & Nelson retained its name, although its logo was soon rewritten in Field's iconic script. Frederick & Nelson created Frango mints, a Seattle tradition. The mints were later also produced in the candy kitchen in the State Street store and became popular in Chicago as well.

Marshall Field & Company became a public company in 1930, early in the Great Depression. The retailer needed capital due to the expense of opening the massive new Merchandise Mart to house its flagging wholesale division. Ground was broken in 1927 and the Mart, then the largest building in the world, opened in 1930. The 1887 Wholesale Store, designed by Richardson at Franklin between Quincy and Adams Streets, was closed and demolished at this time. The new building, faced with a change in retail distribution and wholesale patterns in addition to the deepening Great Depression, could not save Field's wholesale division. Simpson left the company, and James O. McKinsey, a University of Chicago professor and founder of the McKinsey and Company consulting firm, was hired to reform Marshall Field's. The wholesale division, once the core of the company, was liquidated by 1936. The Davis Store was closed in 1936, and its building was sold to Goldblatts. In 1939, the land underlying the main State Street store was acquired from the Marshall Field Trust. Meanwhile, McKinsey also reorganized the company's vertically integrated operations, notably by merging its varied textile operations under the Fieldcrest name.

=== Suburban expansion ===
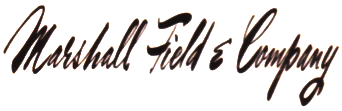
Marshall Field & Company logo used prior to the BATUS acquisition in 1982; it would be shortened to "Marshall Field's".

In 1945, the Merchandise Mart building was sold to Joseph P. Kennedy, Sr., significantly improving Marshall Field's finances and enabling the store to cope with the suburban residential and commercial boom following World War II. Marshall Field's presciently followed its customers to their new homes outwards to the suburbs, including opening a store in 1950 in partnership with pioneering suburban developer Philip M. Klutznick (a famous Jewish leader and later U.S. Secretary of Commerce) at his new Park Forest Plaza, which utilized revolutionary new concepts in land use and architecture.

In 1956, Klutznick and Field's jointly opened Old Orchard Shopping Center in Skokie, Illinois, which Klutznick developed on land that Field's already owned; the development included a new Field's store. This was followed by the 1959 opening of a Field's store at the Mayfair Mall in Wauwatosa, Wisconsin, and stores at later Klutznick-led shopping centers opened at Oakbrook Center in Oak Brook in 1962 and River Oaks Center in Calumet City in 1966.

Marshall Field's even expanded further in the Pacific Northwest, acquiring The Crescent department store in Spokane, Washington, in 1962. In 1970, it moved east with the purchase of Halle Brothers Co., a leading department store in Cleveland, Ohio. Field's also continued to expand its hometown base in Illinois, opening a store at Woodfield Mall in Schaumburg in 1971.

Marshall Field's locations at CherryVale Mall in Rockford and Hawthorn Mall in Vernon Hills followed in 1973, and stores at Water Tower Place in Chicago and Fox Valley Mall in Aurora opened in 1975. The suburban expansion continued in 1976 with a location at Orland Square Mall in Orland Park, followed by the Louis Joliet Mall in Joliet in 1978. In 1979, Marshall Field's expanded south into Texas with a store at The Galleria in Houston.

1980 saw the rapid acquisition of J.B. Ivey Co., a department store chain with roots in Charlotte, North Carolina, and Jacksonville, Florida, as well as The Union Co. in Columbus, Ohio; the Lipman's stores in Portland, Oregon; and several Liberty House stores in Washington state. Field's existing Frederick & Nelson unit in Seattle absorbed the Lipman's and Liberty House stores under its name, but after initially merging The Union with its earlier Halle's stores from Cleveland, it decided to sell the combined chain in November 1981; the new owners quickly liquidated it.

The early 1980s saw slower expansion, with just two store locations in Illinois added: one at Spring Hill Mall in West Dundee in October 1980, and one at Stratford Square Mall in Bloomingdale in 1981. Another Texas store opened at the Dallas Galleria in 1982.

=== BATUS ===
In 1982, Marshall Field & Co. ceased to be a public company, being acquired by British-American Tobacco (BAT). As part of BATUS Retail Group, the American retailing arm of BAT, Field's and its Frederick & Nelson, Ivey's and The Crescent department stores and the John Brueners home furnishings stores joined retailers Gimbels, Saks Fifth Avenue and Kohl's. Field's continued to expand under BATUS, adding stores at Houston's Town & Country Mall in 1983 and at the North Star Mall in San Antonio in 1986.

Only four years after buying Marshall Field's, BATUS scaled back its retail operations in 1986, selling Frederick & Nelson and The Crescent to a local investor group. Frederick & Nelson quickly deteriorated and became defunct in 1992. Its 1914 building, the one acquired by Field's in 1929, was eventually bought by Nordstrom; the structure was renovated and reopened in 1998 as a replacement for Nordstrom's own Seattle parent store.

In 1986, BATUS closed its Gimbels division and transferred five of its Wisconsin locations to its Marshall Field's division: downtown Milwaukee, Northridge Mall and Southridge Mall in Milwaukee, Hilldale Shopping Center in Madison, and in downtown Appleton. The former Gimbels locations in Northridge and Southridge were retained by Field's for only three years; due to poor performance, they were sold to H.C. Prange Co. of Sheboygan in 1989.

The Evanston and Oak Park stores were closed in 1986, their 1929 buildings deemed out of date and too costly to operate. A major restoration and renovation of the State Street flagship store led by Director of Construction and Maintenance Bill Allen commenced in 1987.

BATUS initially kept Saks Fifth Avenue, Marshall Field's, and Ivey's. However, it sold all its remaining U.S. retail assets in 1990, with Saks going to Bahrain-based Investcorp, Ivey's sold to Dillard's, and Marshall Field's sold to then Dayton-Hudson Corporation (now Target Corporation).

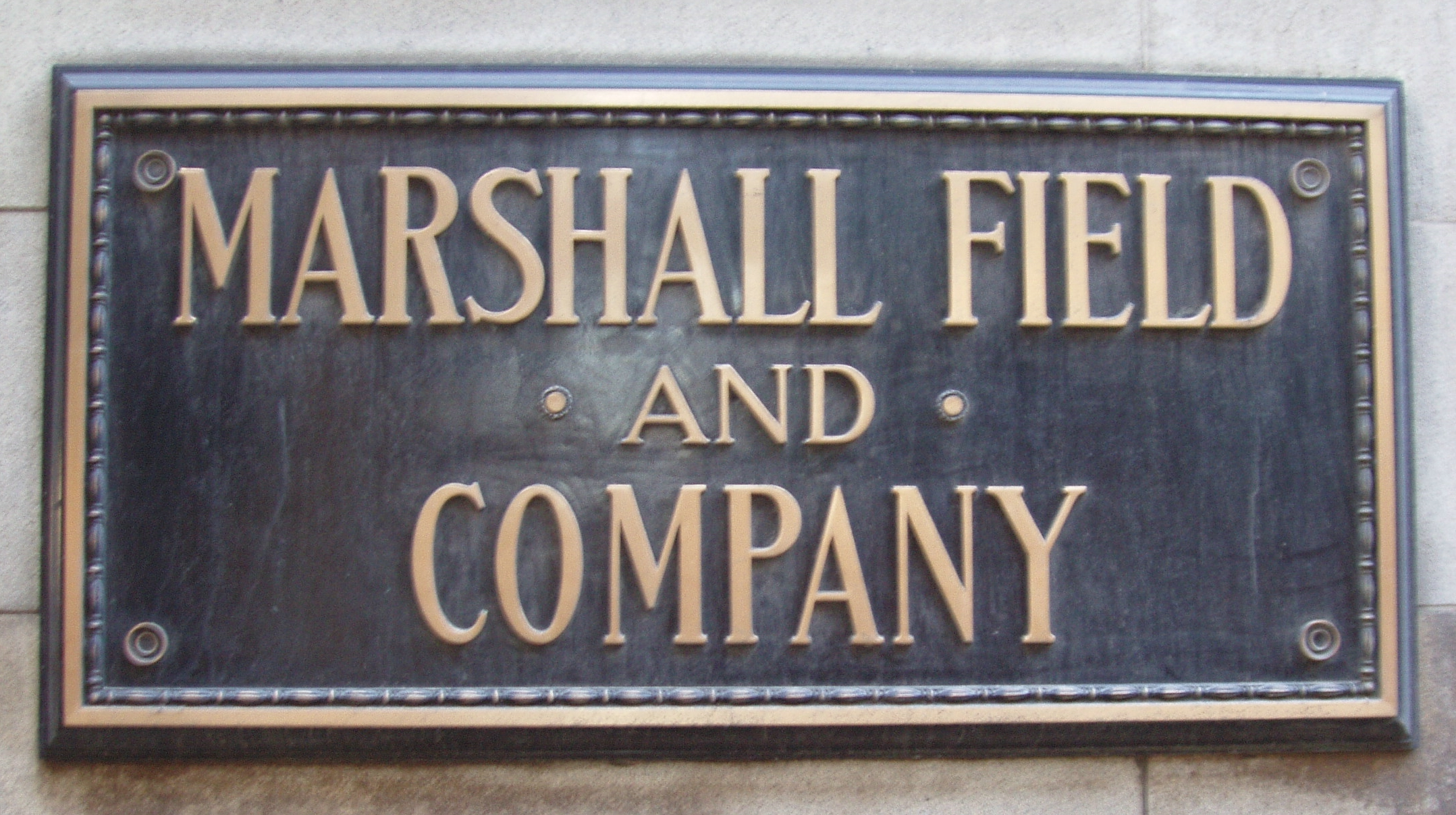
The name plaque at the State Street store in Chicago

=== Dayton-Hudson, Target, and May ===
Dayton-Hudson Corporation renamed itself Target Corporation in 2000, and converted its Dayton's and Hudson's department stores (which were outside of Field's existing markets) to Marshall Field's locations in 2001. Target Corporation introduced some of the brands carried there to the Marshall Field's stores, displacing some of Field's more expensive merchandise.

In 2004, Target Corporation sold the Marshall Field's chain to May Co., exiting the traditional department store business entirely. It was hoped that aligning with the May Company instead of the discounter Target would "let Field's be Field's" and allow it to recapture its former cachet and upper-class customer base. However, Federated Department Stores, Inc. acquired the May Company in 2005.

=== Federated acquisition, renaming and protest ===
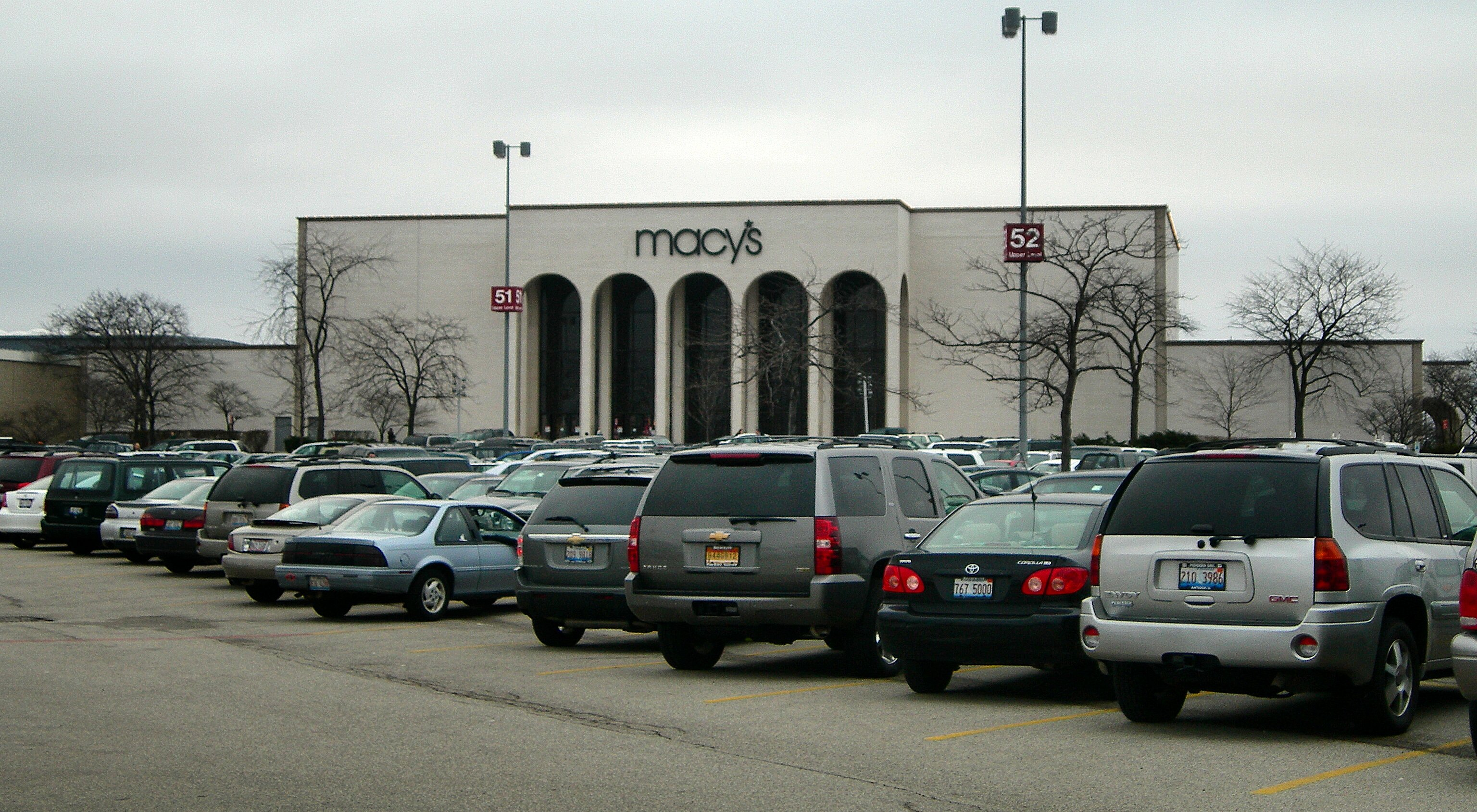
A former Marshall Field's store at Westfield Hawthorn in Vernon Hills, converted to a Macy's in 2006

After the Federated purchase, Marshall Field's stores joined L. S. Ayres and existing Macy's stores in the new Macy's North Division. On September 9, 2006, all Marshall Field's stores, most Filene's and all the stores of nine other May-owned chains were converted to Macy's locations. Many Chicagoans resented Macy's, based in New York City, for replacing their local brand. Hundreds of protesters gathered under Marshall Field's famous clock that day, and returned a year later on September 9, 2007. Dozens attended "Field's Fans" rallies each anniversary from 2008 to 2012.

Many Chicagoans felt betrayed by Macy's takeover of Marshall Field's when the company began to change its aesthetics and customer service standards, and demoted many Chicago-based brands. In December 2006, Macy's reported 30% slower sales in former Marshall Field's stores; the focus shifted to promoting the State Street location in 2007.

=== Renovations ===
The Marshall Field and Company Building at State and Washington Streets in Chicago was listed on the National Register of Historic Places in 1978 and is part of the Loop Retail National Historic District. The building was designated a Chicago Landmark on November 1, 2005. With approximately two million square feet of available floor space, the building is the second-largest department store in the United States.

In 1987, while under BATUS ownership, Field's State Street store underwent significant restoration. In 2004, while Field's was still owned by Dayton Hudson/Target, another extensive restoration of the landmark State Street store began, costing $115 million (~$188 million in 2025); the renovation was completed after the May acquisition. The 2004 renovations included the installation of new lower-level shops, the removal of steel grates from the upper portions of the store's historic light wells, and the addition of an eleven-story atrium in what had been an alley and mid-store light shaft.

In 2004, Field's also introduced significant upgrades to merchandise and the introduction of luxury vendor relationships, in which 10% of the floor space was leased to outside vendors in a manner similar to Selfridge's in London (founded by former Field's executive Harry Selfridge, who based his business model on Marshall Field's; likewise, the Selfridge's building in London was based on the architecture of the Marshall Field's store).

== Firsts, noted events, community leadership ==
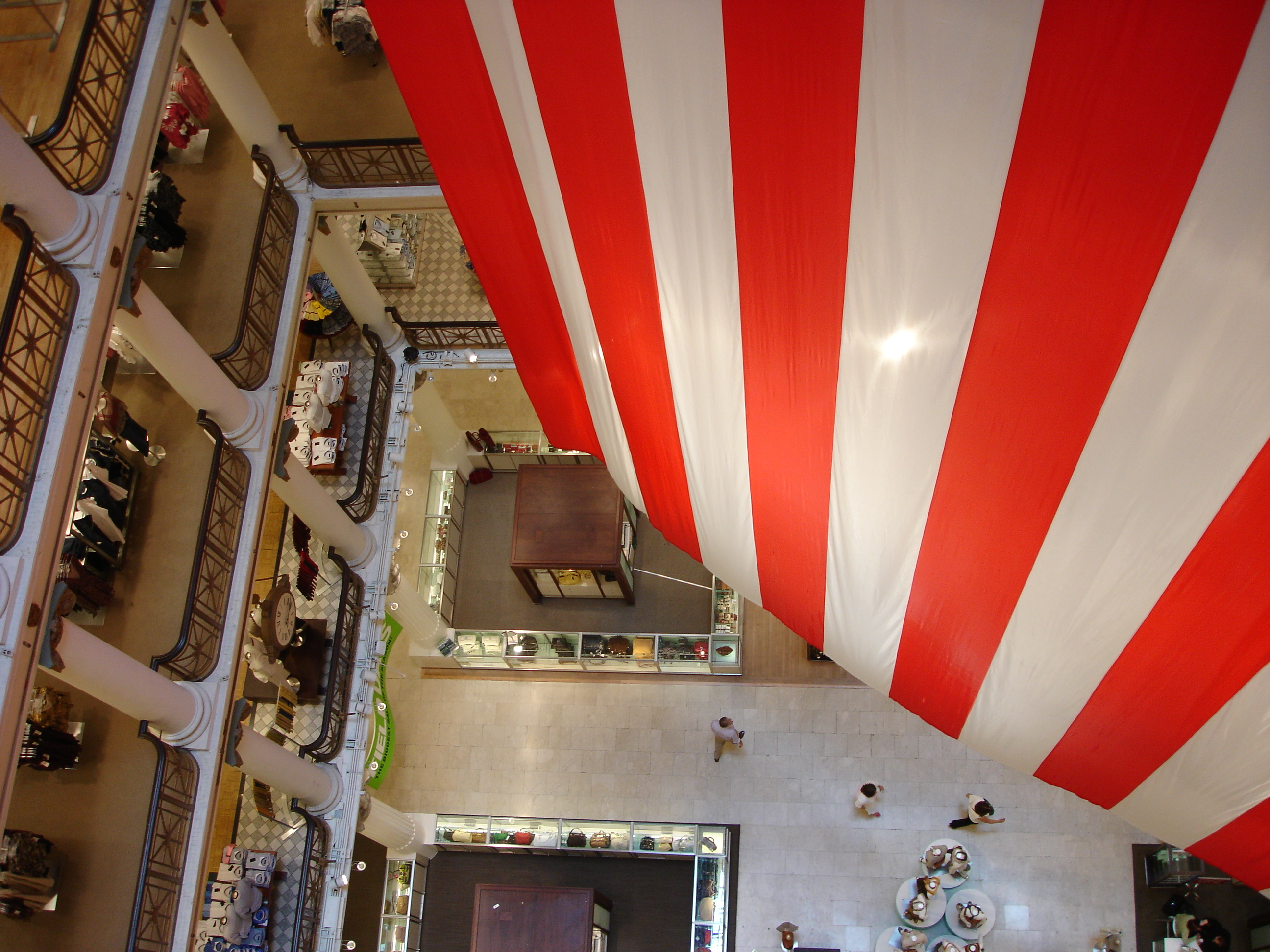
An overhead view of the atrium of the flagship Marshall Field's store in 2006

Among the "firsts" by Marshall Field's was the concept of the department store tea room. In the 19th century, ladies shopping downtown returned home for lunch; having lunch at a downtown restaurant unescorted by a gentleman was not considered ladylike. But after a Marshall Field's clerk shared her lunch (a chicken pot pie) with a tired shopper, Field's hit on the idea of opening a department store tea room, so that women shoppers would not feel the need to make two trips to complete their shopping. To this day, the Walnut Room serves the traditional Mrs. Herring's chicken pot pie.

Marshall Field's had the first European buying office, which was located in Manchester, England, and the first bridal registry. The company was the first to introduce the concept of the personal shopper, and that service was provided without charge in every Field's store, right up to the chain's last days under the Marshall Field's name. It was the first store to offer revolving credit and the first department store to use escalators. Marshall Field's book department in the State Street store was legendary; it pioneered the concept of the "book signing." Moreover, every year at Christmas, Marshall Field's downtown store windows were filled with animated displays as part of the downtown shopping district display; the "theme" window displays became famous for their ingenuity and beauty, and visiting the Marshall Field's windows at Christmas became a tradition for Chicagoans and visitors alike, as popular a local practice as visiting the Walnut Room with its equally famous Christmas tree or meeting "under the clock" on State Street.

Marshall Field was famous for his slogan "Give the lady what she wants," as well as for his integrity, character, and community philanthropy and leadership. After his death, the company remained to the very end a major philanthropic contributor to its Chicago-area community.

Field, the store he created, and his successor John G. Shedd helped establish Chicago's prominence throughout the world in business, art, culture, and education. The Art Institute of Chicago, the Field Museum of Natural History (as renamed in 1905 for its first major benefactor), the Museum of Science and Industry, the John G. Shedd Aquarium and the University of Chicago have all been aided by the philanthropy of Marshall Field's. Marshall Field was also a major sponsor of the 1893 World's Columbian Exposition.

== See also ==
- List of department stores converted to Macy's
- Marshall Field and Company archives
