= Brookfield Square =

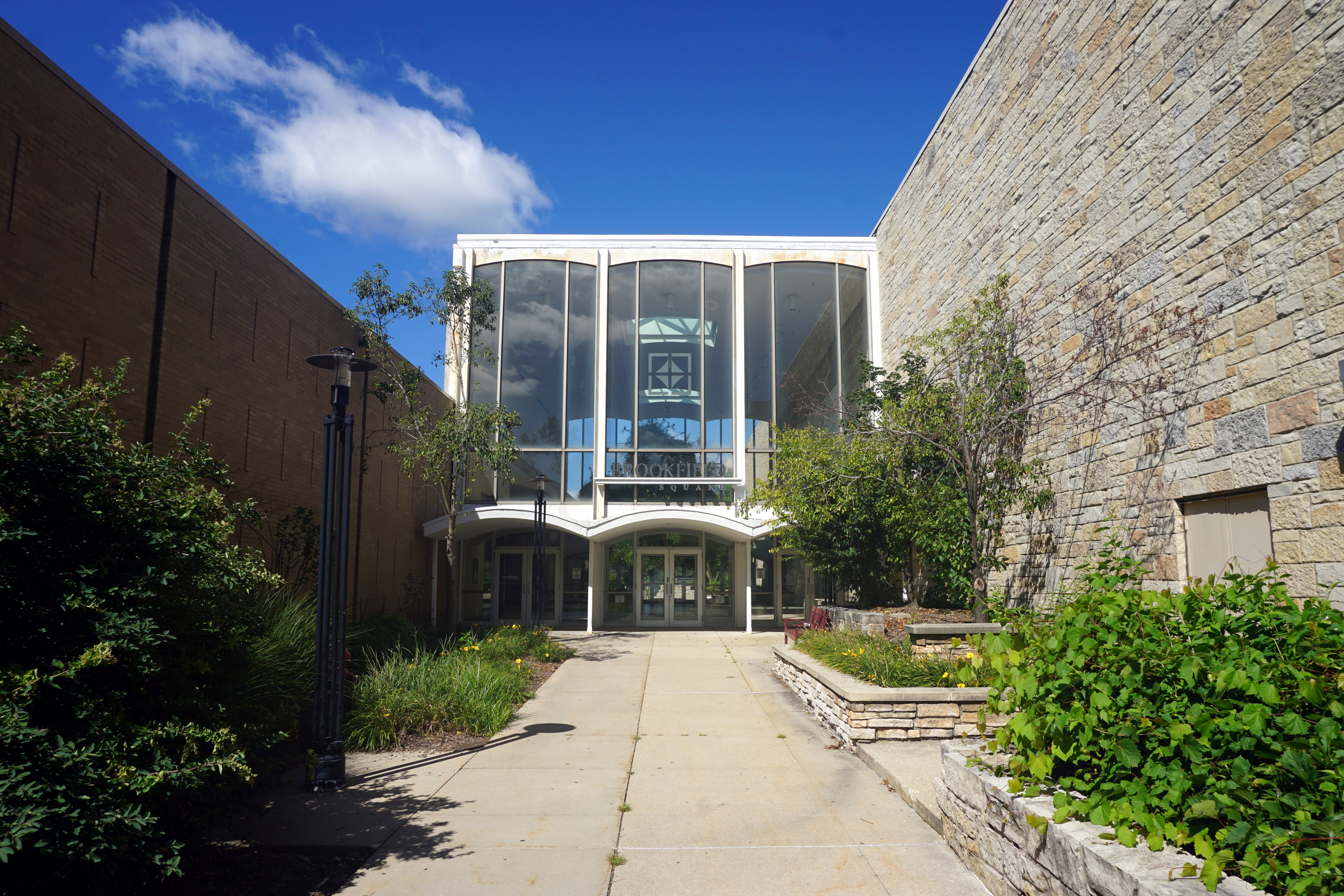
- Exterior of Brookfield Square
- Location: Brookfield, Wisconsin, United States
- Address: 95 N. Moorland Road
- Opened: 1967
- Developer: Richard E. Jacobs Group
- Owner: CBL & Associates Properties
- Num. of stores: 100+
- Num. of anchor tenants: 5 (4 open, 1 vacant)
- Floor area: 1,090,970 ft^{2} (101,354 m^{2})
- Floors: 1 (2 in anchors and Barnes & Noble)
- Parking: 5,061
- Public transit: Waukesha Metro Transit
- Website: shopbrookfieldsquaremall.com

Brookfield Square is a mall in Brookfield, Wisconsin, that originally opened in 1967. The shopping mall is located in Brookfield, Wisconsin, a suburb of Milwaukee in Waukesha County, 3 miles (4.8 km) west of the Milwaukee County line. Waukesha Metro Route 1 serves the mall and connects to downtown Waukesha and MCTS Connect 1 to downtown Milwaukee. The mall is located at the intersection of Bluemound Road and Moorland Road, near Interstate 94. It is managed by CBL & Associates Properties. The anchor stores are JCPenney, WhirlyBall, Marcus Theatres, and Barnes & Noble.

== History ==
Brookfield Square was built in 1967 as a three-anchor, one-story shopping mall with 60 stores and services, including the two same anchors it has today, plus a Sears, a Kohl's Food Store, a Woolworth's, T. A. Chapman's, and Walgreens. Kohl's left the mall in 1977 and its space was converted into a Houlihan's restaurant. Woolworth's and the mall's single screen cinema left the mall in 1994 and a food court was created in its place.

The mall went under a renovation in 2004, creating new outparcel stores and restaurants. The mall's interior was given a new style, and new restaurants were built on the exterior walls of the mall. Shortly after the renovation was completed, on April 13, 2005, a two-story Barnes & Noble store opened outside of the main mall entrance.

Red Robin opened at the mall on November 8, 2010.

In November 2013, an expansion was proposed for nine more storefronts. Old Navy and Hallmark Cards both closed in early 2014. Also in 2014, Shoe Carnival was added in the Sears wing. The Sears anchor was closed temporarily in September 2014 because of structural concerns over its roof and closed permanently in mid-March 2018 as part of a plan to close 103 stores nationwide. The Sears anchor building was demolished in June 2018. The Boston Store closed in August 2018, This left JCPenney as the only anchor until Fall 2019 when the former Sears space was replaced by a Movie Tavern by Marcus and Whirlyball entertainment center.

On July 11, 2018, it was announced that Dillard's and the Streetscape Retail would replace the Boston Store, but in April 2019, it was reported that Dillard's had changed its mind and was no longer considering an expansion into the Milwaukee area.

The vacant Boston Store anchor building was demolished in 2024.
