= Mayfair Mall =

Shopping mall in Wauwatosa, Wisconsin

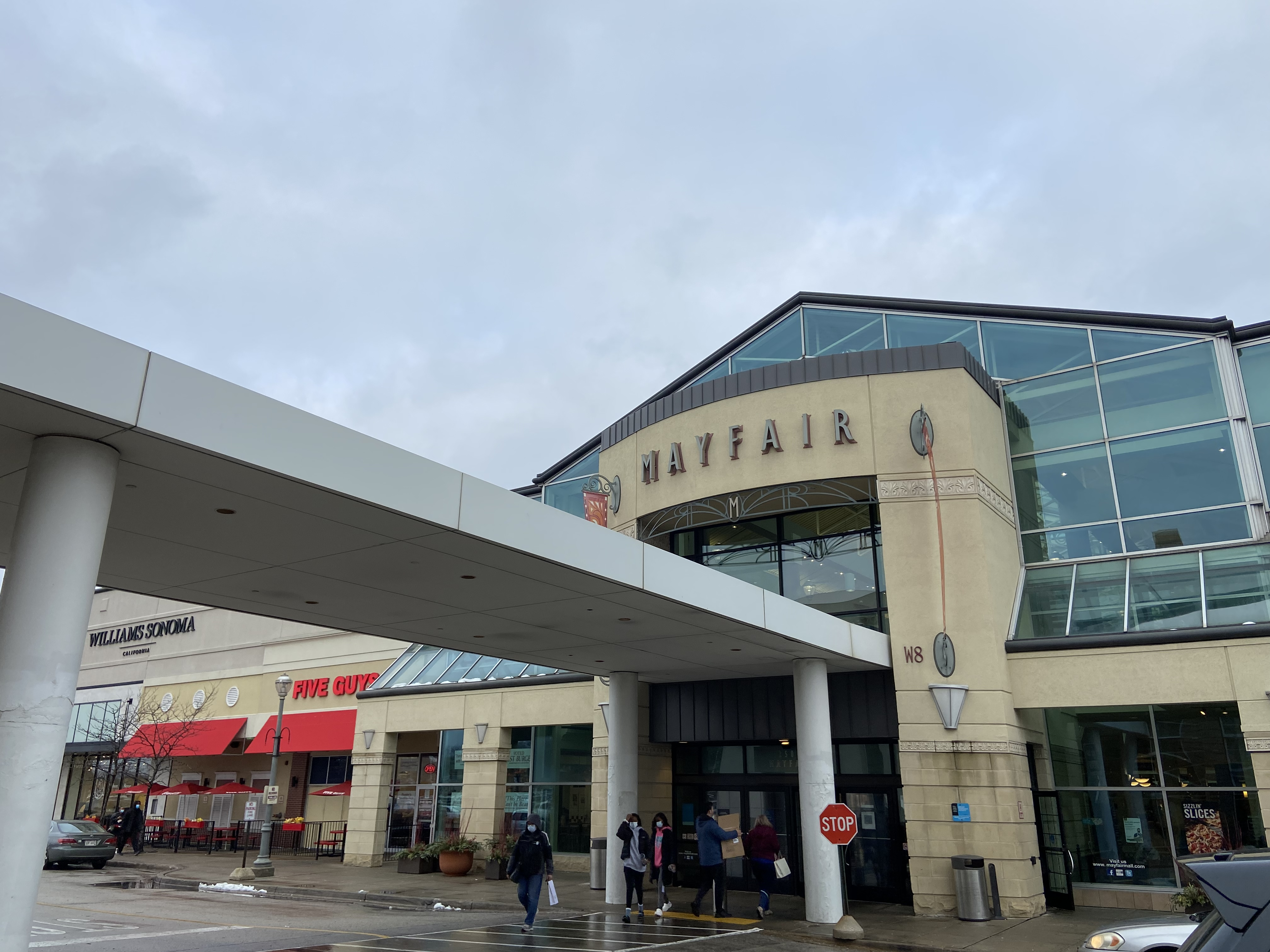
- Location: Wauwatosa, Wisconsin, United States
- Coordinates: 43°3′50″N 088°2′41″W
- Address: Mayfair Road (Highway 100)
- Opened: 1958; 68 years ago
- Developer: Kurtis Froedtert
- Manager: GGP
- Owner: GGP
- Num. of stores: 161 (November 2023)
- Num. of anchor tenants: 7 (6 open, 1 coming soon)
- Floor area: 1,265,396 sq ft (117,559.1 m^{2})
- Floors: 2 (3 in Anchors, 2 in Barnes & Noble)
- Parking: 6,500 spaces
- Public transit: Milwaukee County Transit System
- Website: mayfairmall.com

Mayfair Mall is a shopping mall located on Mayfair Road (Highway 100) between North Avenue and Center Street in Wauwatosa, Wisconsin, United States. It serves the Greater Milwaukee area, and is also Wisconsin's premier shopping Center and Largest Mall in Wisconsin with 161 stores. Mayfair Shopping Center was constructed from 1956 and completed in 1959 by the Hunzinger Construction Company. It has been expanded several times since it was first built.

The mall contains 164 stores and the anchor stores are Macy's, Crate & Barrel, The Container Store, Barnes & Noble, Nordstrom and AMC Theatres. There is one vacant anchor store that was once Boston Store, but will soon be replaced by a 210,000 square foot Scheels flagship location opening in 2027.

== History ==
The mall's Gimbels anchor store opened first, at the south end, in September 1958. Three weeks later, on October 9, 1958, the 960-foot (290 m) open-air central portion opened as the Mayfair Shopping Center, featuring more than 70 stores. In January 1959, a six-story office building, the Professional Building, opened in the middle of the mall. In February 1959, Chicago-based Marshall Field's opened their anchor store at the mall's north end. Three east–west corridors (North Mall, Central Park, and South Mall) ran the width of the mall, with each corridor decorated in a different color. The mall's central court also featured a park, which included trees, flowers, benches and picnic tables.

In 1973, the Mayfair Mall was fully enclosed. An arcade called The Bazaar replaced the Central Park area of Mayfair. An office tower was built on the southwest side of the mall in 1975, and construction began on a second in November 1977.

In 1986, Mayfair was rededicated following a $15 million remodeling effort. The Bazaar and the center court ice rink were both removed. A two-level atrium was built, featuring a new food court. The upper level was also expanded, adding 78,000 square feet (7,200 m^{2}) of retail space. Following this expansion, the mall included 109 stores including Milwaukee based Boston Store which replaced Gimbels.

In 1998, the shopping center was purchased by General Growth Properties. A subsequent renovation project added a movie theater and a Barnes & Noble bookstore in 1998, and more than 100,000 square feet (9,300 m^{2}) of retail space to the upper level in 2000. The second floor of the atrium was expanded across the entire mall adding new restaurants and shops. A cinema was also added, acting as a third anchor at Mayfair.

Mayfair dealt with increased competition from other Milwaukee area shopping centers, including Bayshore Town Center, which underwent remodeling and nearby Brookfield Square. A teen curfew was instituted in the 2010s due to several incidents within the mall and after films at the multiplex let out on weekends.

In June 2003, Maggiano's Little Italy opened in the Marshall Field's wing. On October 26, 2004, a Cheesecake Factory restaurant opened on an outparcel. In 2005, a Crate & Barrel opened in front of the main mall entrance. The General Cinema multiplex was acquired by AMC Theatres after GCC's purchase by AMC. Marshall Field's converted to Macy's in 2006 as part of the broad rebranding of the Federated Department Stores to the Macy's label.

Nordstrom opened in the mall on October 23, 2015. It was the first full-line Nordstrom store to open in the state of Wisconsin. Nordstrom wanted to meet such high demand, and Milwaukee was the largest metropolitan area without a Nordstrom. The Container Store also opened in 2015.

Boston Store closed in 2018 due to Bon-Ton filing for Chapter 11 bankruptcy protection and closing all stores.

In February 2025 Scheels announced it would be opening in the former Boston Store, with plans to open by spring of 2027.

=== 2020 shootings ===
On February 2, 2020, Alvin Cole, a 17-year-old, was killed in an incident with police. Cole was shot five times by former Wauwatosa Officer Joseph Mensah. The officer was suspended and eventually resigned after an independent investigation led by former U.S. Attorney Steven Biskupic called for his dismissal due to him being involved in two other fatal shootings, among other issues. The investigation revealed that Cole never shot an officer; the only bullet Cole fired hitting himself in the arm while running away and dropping to the ground.

On November 20, 2020, a mass shooting occurred at the mall. Eight non-life-threatening injuries were reported, drawing a massive emergency response, including the FBI. The shooter fled the scene afterwards. A 15-year-old was arrested in connection with the shooting.

== Anchors ==
=== Current anchors ===
- Barnes & Noble — Opened in 1998
- AMC Theatres — Opened in 2002
- Crate & Barrel — Opened in 2005
- Macy's — Opened in 2006
- The Container Store — Opened in 2015 (outparcel anchor)
- Nordstrom — Opened in 2015

=== Upcoming anchors ===
- Scheels — Scheduled to open in 2027

=== Former anchors ===
- Gimbels — Opened in 1958, closed in 1986, replaced by Boston Store
- Marshall Field's — Opened in 1959, converted to Macy's in 2006
- Boston Store — Opened in 1987, closed in 2018, being replaced by Scheels in 2027
- General Cinema — Opened in 1999, converted to AMC Theatres in 2002j

== The Mayfair Collection ==
In fall 2015, a new shopping center opened just northwest of Mayfair Mall known as The Mayfair Collection. It has stores like Nordstrom Rack, Old Navy, Dick's Sporting Goods, Whole Foods Market, and Versona Accessories. It also has a Homewood Suites by Hilton hotel. as well as a planned apartment complex known as Uptown at the District and several restaurants as well. Phase 2 is yet to be complete with stores and restaurants.
