= List of University of Memphis people =

The following is a list of notable University of Memphis people, including alumni, notable faculty members and administrators, and others affiliated with the University of Memphis.

== Notable alumni ==
=== Government, public service, and public policy ===
- Rex Armistead – private detective, investigator for the defunct Mississippi State Sovereignty Commission and the Arkansas Project
- Arthur Barclay – New Jersey General Assembly member
- Angie Craig – United States representative for Minnesota's 2nd Congressional District
- Bernice Donald – United States district court judge
- Bob Fisher – president of Belmont University since 2000
- John Ford – Tennessee politician
- Tre Hargett – secretary of state, Tennessee
- Willie Herenton – former mayor of Memphis
- Ed Jackson – Tennessee state senator
- James F. Kyle – state senator, Tennessee Legislature
- David Lillard – Tennessee state treasurer since 2009
- Viola Harris Mcferren – civil rights activist
- Curtis S. Person Jr. – former state senator, Tennessee Legislature
- Van Poole – former member of both houses of the Florida Legislature
- Frank Scott Jr. – current mayor of Little Rock, AR
- Jim Strickland – former mayor of Memphis
- Fred Thompson – actor and former U.S. senator

=== Literature, arts, and media ===
- Barbara Anderson – actress
- Dixie Carter – actress
- Eric Jerome Dickey – author
- John Dye – actor
- Johanna Edwards – bestselling novelist
- Galen Fott – director and animator
- Brian A. Hopkins – author
- Jason Isbell – recording artist and songwriter, member of The 400 Unit and Drive-By Truckers
- Michael Jeter – actor
- Terry Manning – music producer, photographer
- Wink Martindale – radio DJ, radio personality, singer, game show host, television personality, television producer (BS 1957)
- Gary Parrish – sports columnist, radio host and television analyst
- Edmund Warren Perry Jr. – writer
- Olan Rogers – comedian, actor, filmmaker, and YouTuber
- William Sanderson – actor
- Stella Stevens – actress
- J. Karen Thomas – actress (Drop Dead Diva, Nashville)
- Trenyce – singer, American Idol finalist

== Athletics ==
- Dave Anderson – multiple teams, MLB
- Vincent Askew – multiple teams, NBA
- Earl Barron – NBA
- Will Barton – Denver Nuggets, NBA
- William Bedford – multiple teams, NBA
- Isaac Bruce – San Francisco 49ers, St. Louis Rams, NFL
- Antonio Burks – NBA
- Rodney Carney – Golden St. Warriors, NBA
- Joey Dorsey – Toronto Raptors, NBA
- Chris Douglas-Roberts – Milwaukee Bucks, NBA
- Jake Elliott – Philadelphia Eagles,
- Tyreke Evans – Sacramento Kings, NBA
- Larry Finch – Memphis TAMs, ABA
- T. J. Frier – football player
- Hunter Goodman – Colorado Rockies,
- Stephen Gostkowski – New England Patriots, NFL
- Earnest Gray – NFL, New York Giants
- Sylvester Gray – Miami Heat, NBA
- Penny Hardaway – NBA
- Jim Hardin – Major League Baseball pitcher, Baltimore Orioles, New York Yankees, Atlanta Braves
- Chad Harville – multiple teams, MLB
- Cedric Henderson – Utah Jazz, NBA
- Richard Jones – New York Nets, NBA
- Larry Kenon – multiple teams, NBA
- Bill Laurie – 1973 NCAA Championship game starting point guard for Memphis State
- Jerry Lawler – Hall of Fame professional wrestler, WWE
- Ronald Leary – Dallas Cowboys, NFL
- Keith Lee – New Jersey Nets, NBA
- James Logan – Houston Oilers, Seattle Seahawks, NFL
- Steve Matthews – Kansas City Chiefs, NFL
- Hank McDowell – multiple teams, NBA
- Mike McKenzie – New Orleans Saints, NFL
- Andy Nelson – Baltimore Colts, NFL
- Lloyd Patterson – Saskatchewan Roughriders
- Ryan Peniston – British tennis player
- Elliot Perry – Phoenix Suns, NBA
- Derrick Rose – Chicago Bulls, NBA
- Jack Smith – Philadelphia Eagles, NFL
- Cliff Taylor – multiple teams, NFL
- Adonis Thomas (born 1993) – basketball player in the Israeli Basketball Premier League
- Andre Turner – multiple teams, NBA
- Dan Uggla – Atlanta Braves, MLB
- David Vaughn – multiple teams, NBA
- Dajuan Wagner – Cleveland Cavaliers, NBA
- Darius Washington – NBA
- Tamika Whitmore – Indiana Fever, WNBA
- Win Wilfong – Cincinnati Royals, NBA
- DeAngelo Williams – Pittsburgh Steelers, NFL
- Shawne Williams – New York Knicks, NBA
- Jacob Wilson – multiple teams, MLB
- Francis Winkler – Green Bay Packers, NFL
- Jerome Woods – Kansas City Chiefs, NFL
- Lorenzen Wright – multiple teams, NBA
- Wayne Yates – Los Angeles Lakers, NBA

== Professors and scholars ==
- Richard Bausch – novelist and short story writer; Moss Chair of Excellence in English at the University of Memphis
- Béla Bollobás – mathematician; known for his work in combinatorics; Fields Medal winner Timothy Gowers' dissertation advisor
- Peter J. Brand – Egyptologist
- Joyce Cobb – jazz vocalist
- Jack Cooper – jazz composer, arranger
- Miriam DeCosta-Willis – first African-American faculty member at what was then Memphis State University
- Ralph Faudree – mathematician with a focus on Ramsey theory; provost of the university
- Robert Fisher – MBA, president of Belmont University
- Stan Franklin – cognitive scientist; proponent of artificial consciousness
- Arthur C. Graesser – cognitive psychologist; editor of the Journal of Educational Psychology
- Jessie Mae Hemphill – electric guitarist, songwriter, and vocalist specializing in Southern music
- Benjamin Hooks – civil rights leader
- Xiangen Hu – professor in cognitive psychology
- John Lee – author, professor of English
- Michael Leff – scholar of rhetoric
- Jennifer R. Mandel – professor of biology
- Milton C. Moreland – archaeologist and president of Centre College
- Cecil C. Rousseau – mathematician and author who specializes in graph theory and combinatorics
- Rebecca Skloot – New York Times bestselling science writer, professor of English
- Joe Gray Taylor – historian and writer

== Coaches ==
- John Calipari – Kentucky basketball coach
- Penny Hardaway – Memphis basketball coach
- Dana Kirk – Memphis basketball coach
- Josh Pastner – Memphis basketball coach
- Tic Price – Memphis basketball coach

== Other ==
- Stan Bronson Jr. – Guinness World Record holder batboy for Memphis Tigers baseball
