= List of Carson–Newman University people =

This is a list of notable current and former faculty members, alumni, and non-graduating attendees of Carson–Newman University in Jefferson City, Tennessee.

== Notable alumni ==
=== Academics ===
- Michael Eric Dyson – author, professor at Georgetown University
- Helen Timmons Henderson – educator, one of the first two women elected to the Virginia House of Delegates
- T. B. Maston – Christian ethicist, writer, and professor
- Garnett S. Stokes – president of University of New Mexico

=== Athletes ===
- Dana X. Bible – American football, baseball and basketball coach and athletic administrator
- Buddy Bolding – head D1 baseball coach, Longwood University 1979–2013
- Shonie Carter – professional mixed martial artist 1997–2015, WEC Welterweight Champion, competed in the UFC
- Marq Cerqua – former NFL football player
- Steve Cishek – former Major League Baseball pitcher for the Washington Nationals
- Todd Collins – former National Football League football player and Super Bowl Champion with the St. Louis Rams
- Joe Fishback – former NFL football player and Super Bowl Champion with the Dallas Cowboys
- Tim George – former NFL wide receiver
- Junior Glymph – former NFL football player
- Boyce Green – former NFL player with the Cleveland Browns
- Robert Griswold – swimmer, Paralympic gold medalist
- Sylvia Hatchell – former head women's basketball coach at UNC, 1986–2019
- Clayton Holmes – former NFL football player and Super Bowl Champion with the Dallas Cowboys
- Darren Hughes – former Arena Football League player
- Chris Jones – former Dallas Cowboys punter
- Cedric Killings – former NFL football player
- Pryor McElveen – former Major League Baseball third baseman for the Brooklyn Dodgers
- Lazaro Reinoso – wrestler, 1992 Olympic bronze medalist, NCAA National Champion for C-N
- Sanders Shiver – former NFL football player and Super Bowl Champion with the Baltimore Colts
- Milas Shoun – former professional basketball player, 1927 to 1939
- Tracy Smothers – former professional wrestler
- Ken Sparks – former C-N football coach, NCAA Hall of Fame member
- Anthony Toribio – former Kansas City Chiefs defensive tackle
- Vernon Turner – former NFL football player (Buffalo Bills, Los Angeles Rams, Detroit Lions, and Tampa Bay Buccaneers)
- Leonard Weaver – former NFL fullback
- Clyde Wright – former Major League Baseball pitcher

=== Musicians ===
- Chris Marion – member of classic rock band Little River Band
- Mary McDonald – musician and composer
- Dolly Parton – country music singer, recipient of honorary doctorate, 1990

=== Politicians ===
- Millard F. Caldwell – 29th governor of Florida, U.S. representative and Florida Supreme Court justice
- Ben W. Hooper – 28th governor of Tennessee 1911–1915
- B. Carroll Reece – member, US House of Representatives from Tennessee, 1921–1931 and 1933–1947
- John Q. Tilson – member, US House of Representatives, 1909–1913 and 1915–1932; House majority leader 1925–1932
- Herbert S. Walters – United States senator from Tennessee 1963–1964

=== Other ===
- Jennifer R. Mandel – biologist
- Kenneth Massey – sports statistician
- Bernie Moore – SEC commissioner, LSU track and field coach
- Marty Smith – sports journalist
