= TOM (mascot) =

Real-life animal sports mascot in the US

TOM (Tigers Of Memphis) is the name of three Bengal tigers which have served as the mascot of the Memphis Tigers since 1972. The most recent, TOM III, was a Bengal tiger mascot for the University of Memphis. He died on September 18, 2020, less than three weeks after his 12th birthday. The Tigers' football team also has a costumed mascot called Pouncer.

TOM III was housed and cared for by the Tiger Guard, a committee of the Highland Hundred football booster club. University funds are not used to provide for the tiger's needs. The University of Memphis was one of two universities in the United States that use a live tiger as a mascot (the other being LSU) and has received criticism from animal welfare organizations.

Until TOM II, Memphis was the only school to have a live tiger mascot present at football games. TOM attends Memphis Tiger home games at Liberty Bowl Memorial Stadium in a special sound proof, air conditioned trailer.

== History ==
=== TOM I ===
The first tiger, TOM, was purchased for $1,500 by the Highland Hundred Football Boosters in 1972. TOM was placed in a dog kennel and flown to Memphis on November 9, 1972. The tiger cub was taken to Athletic Director Billy J. Murphy's office for a press conference and was officially presented to Memphis University in a Liberty Bowl Memorial Stadium ceremony during the November 11, 1972, football game against the University of Cincinnati.

TOM was initially named Shane at the suggestion of the breeder’s daughter. Once in Memphis, a contest was held to rename the mascot and over 2,500 entries were submitted to a committee chaired by Harry Pierotti. The list was reduced to two choices, Shane, and TOM, which stands for Tigers Of Memphis and TOM was the victor. The winning entry was submitted by Mrs. Lauraine Huddleston of Memphis.

During his first few months in Memphis, TOM was housed in Highland Hundred member Bill Proctor's garage. TOM was later moved to the Memphis Zoo and put under the care of trainer Louie Bell. The tiger grew to weigh over 600 pounds, becoming one of the larger documented captive Bengal tigers. TOM served as a mascot for nearly 20 years until he died in February 1992.

=== TOM II ===
As TOM grew older, the decision was made by the Highland Hundred to keep the Tiger Tradition alive by securing a new tiger to be raised as TOM II. In the fall of 1991, Highland Hundred President Ray Daniels and President-Elect Bobby Wharton received TOM II as a gift from Tom and Carolyn Atchison of Florence, Alabama. The tiger was born on July 11 of that year, and, as TOM had been, he was presented by the Highland Hundred to the university in a ceremony at Liberty Bowl Memorial Stadium on November 16, 1991, during a football game against the University of Alabama.

TOM II spent his life housed in private facilities maintained by the Highland Hundred Tiger Guard. After many years spent living in the home of William Nixon, TOM was moved to a tiger house constructed at St. Nick’s Farm and Zoological Park in the Memphis suburb of Collierville. The $300,000 facility was paid for by the Tiger Guard. TOM II matured, growing to weigh more than 500 pounds.

TOM II lived in the Collierville facility for nearly 14 years. In the summer of 2005, the Tiger Guard, led by Bobby Wharton, began construction of new habitat in a rural area just south of Memphis. The new facility was similar to the original and included two swimming pools, a dedicated water well, a climate-controlled den box, a veterinary facility and multiple redundant security features.

TOM II was diagnosed with cancer during an annual 2008 medical examination and died on October 15 of that year at the age of 17. He outlived all four of his siblings by a number of years. He also far exceeded the life expectancy of a male tiger outside captivity.

As was the case with TOM I in 1992, TOM II was cremated. The university's Athletic Department made arrangements for a permanent exhibit to honor all previous and future TOMs in the Athletics Hall of Fame which was to be constructed at the corner of Southern and Normal.

University of Memphis president Shirley Raines received pressure from People for the Ethical Treatment of Animals to cease using a live mascot shortly before TOM III was acquired.

=== TOM III ===
TOM III was the last mascot for the Memphis Tigers. He was born on August 31, 2008, to Vixie and Thor at the Wisconsin Big Cat Rescue & Educational Center in Rock Springs, Wisconsin. TOM III and his two brothers were the result of an unexpected pregnancy at the cat sanctuary. He has two symmetric stripes that run lengthwise down the base of his tail. TOM III served as the mascot for 12 years and died shortly after his 12th birthday on September 18, 2020.
