= M. David Rudd =

American psychologist and academic administrator

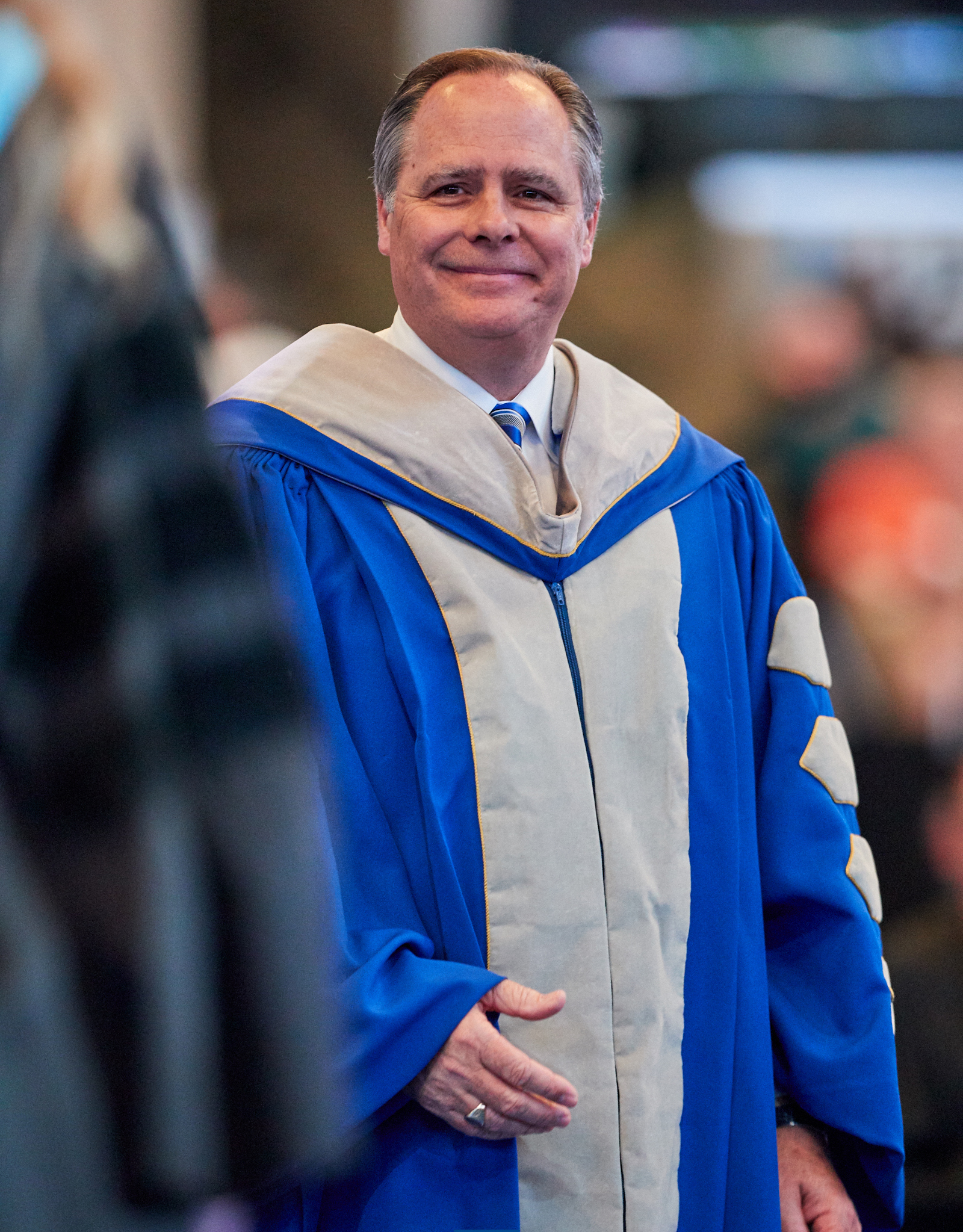
- M. David Rudd at University of Memphis Commencement Ceremony

12th President of University of Memphis
- In office May 1, 2014 – March 31, 2022
- Preceded by: Shirley C. Raines; R. Brad Martin (interim)
- Succeeded by: Bill Hardgrave

Personal details
- Spouse: Loretta Rudd
- Education: Princeton University (BA); University of Texas at Austin (MA, PhD)
- Profession: University administrator and Distinguished University Professor of Psychology

M. David Rudd is an American psychologist and academic administrator who served as the president of the University of Memphis from 2014 to 2022.

== Education ==
Rudd earned a bachelor’s degree (BA) cum laude in psychology from Princeton University in 1983, where he also lettered in Varsity football. He returned to his home state of Texas to study at University of Texas at Austin, where he holds a master’s degree (MA) and Ph.D. in psychology. Rudd then began active duty service in the United States Military as a U.S. Army Captain originally stationed at Fort Ord, California and later at Fort Hood, Texas, transitioning from active duty service following the Gulf War. He is a life member of the American Legion. He completed a post-doctoral fellowship in cognitive therapy at the Beck Institute for Cognitive Behavior Therapy during his tenure at Scott & White Clinic and Hospital, now Baylor Scott & White.

== Professional Experience ==
Rudd served as a faculty member at Texas A&M College of Medicine while on staff at Scott & White Clinic and Hospital, eventually earning tenure as an associate professor. In 1999, he began at Baylor University as a full professor and director of the Clinical Psychology doctoral program. He earned tenure as a full professor at Baylor and also served as chair of the Department of Psychology from 2004 to 2005. From 2006 to 2009, Rudd served as professor and chair of the Department of Psychology at Texas Tech University. In 2009, he accepted the position of dean for the College of Social and Behavioral Science at the University of Utah. While there, he co-founded the National Center for Veterans Studies.

In 2013, he moved to Memphis, Tennessee, to become provost of the University of Memphis and eventually president in 2014 and serving in that role for eight years.

== University of Memphis presidency ==
He was named the 12th president of the University of Memphis on May 1, 2014. He completed his tenure as president on March 30, 2022, to return to faculty and his scientific research agenda, with his work in the treatment of suicidality serving as foundational in the creation of a new digital therapeutics company, Oui Therapeutics.

Rudd worked in support of an autonomous governing board for the University of Memphis and in 2016, The Focus on College and University Success (FOCUS) Act was passed by the Tennessee General Assembly, allowing the university to establish a board of trustees. The university became the first institution of higher learning to partner with Folds of Honor to support higher education for spouses and children of American soldiers who have died during their service. Rudd founded a consortium in 2019 to encourage other universities to adopt similar programs. The University of Memphis achieved Carnegie R1 designation as a top-tier research university during his tenure, one of only nine universities nationally to move from Carnegie R2 to Carnegie R1 status in the 2021 rankings. Rudd's tenure, described as "transformative", has been marked by enrollment growth nationally, record fundraising numbers, expansion of campus infrastructure, cost-containment and significant improvement in student affordability, achieved ranking as a top-tier public university in USNWR for the first time in university history, along with increased student retention, and the highest graduation rates in university history. Rudd established U of M Global, a fully online division, early in his tenure. It proved to be the fastest growing segment of the University. During Rudd's tenure, the university expanded its campus school from a single elementary location, to include a middle school and two high schools (one on the main U of M campus and one on its Lambuth campus).

During Rudd's final year, the U of M Board of Trustees were one of six universities nationally to receive the Association of Governing Board's Nason Award, in recognition of "exceptional leadership".

Rudd was active in leadership with the American Athletic Conference (AAC) during his tenure, serving a two-year term as vice-chair, a two-year term as chair, serving on the NCAA presidential forum for three years, and being appointed to the NCAA Board of Directors in 2021.

A national controversy during his tenure was the decision to support James Wiseman and Coach Penny Hardaway in a dispute with the NCAA regarding Wiseman's eligibility. After a contentious and long investigation, the Independent Accountability Resolution Process (IARP) ruled in the Tigers' and Wiseman's favor, determining that Hardaway providing $11,500 in moving expenses for the Wiseman family was not an impermissible benefit, rendering the subsequent investigation inappropriate. The University was given minimal penalties, including no post-season ban and no suspension for Hardaway.

In recognition of his service to the University of Memphis, the Board of Trustees created an approximately $4M endowment for a new initiative, the Rudd Institute for Veteran and Military Suicide Prevention, which will focus on clinical service delivery and related research for active-duty military and Veterans. Rudd will direct the Institute and serve as a tenured Distinguished University Professor of Psychology. The Dr. M. David Rudd Scholarship for U.S. Military Veterans is awarded annually at the University of Memphis.

== Research ==
Rudd's research has been in the fields of suicide clinical assessment, management and treatment of suicide risk, suicide prevention and cognitive therapy. Rudd was identified as being in the top .02% of the most productive researchers globally in suicide research over the past decade by Expertscape in 2021-2026, and in the top .02% of most impactful scholars globally, 4th most impactful with regard to suicide risk and 20th most impactful lifetime suicide researcher worldwide by ScholarGPS in 2026, and his work has been cited over 22,000 times, along with an h-index of 76. He is one of the creators of Brief Cognitive Behavioral Therapy for Suicide Prevention (BCBT-SP), based on his proposed "suicidal mode", which was found to reduce post-treatment suicide attempt rates by 60% in comparison to treatment as usual. The most recent successful application of BCBT-SP in an inpatient setting (BCBT-I) reduced post-discharge suicide risk 60% in comparison to TAU and also reduced emergency department visits during follow-up by 75% and hospital readmissions by 71%. He also proposed Fluid Vulnerability Theory as an explanatory model for understanding, assessing, and intervening with those at risk for suicide. Rudd's early work, including a clinical trial in the early 90's, developed and utilized crisis response planning as an alternative to "no suicide contracts", an intervention proven effective for those presenting with suicide risk and a precursor to the commonly used variant, safety planning. He created the now frequently used Suicide Cognitions Scale in early 2008 and subsequent modifications, including the Brief Suicide Cognitions Scale He led the effort to identify and implement "suicide warning signs", forming the original working group in coordination with the American Association of Suicidality and publishing the first article identifying empirically supported suicide warning signs. Most recently, he's been involved in the digital adaptation of BCBT-SP

Rudd's active research program, including most recent publications and work through the Clinical Risk, Resilience and Intervention Lab (and the Rudd Institute for Veteran and Military Suicide Prevention, can be followed at: https://www.crrilabmemphis.com/. The link also includes connection to a new psychology podcast which will be launched in late 2026 or early 2027, The Conditioned Human.

== Professional activities ==
Rudd is a Diplomate of the American Board of Professional Psychology and a Fellow of three professional societies. He has served as a consultant to the United States Air Force, the U.S. Army, the Department of Defense and the Beijing Suicide Prevention and Research Center. In 2010, he co-founded the National Center for Veterans Studies at the University of Utah.

Rudd has served on the Institute of Medicine/National Academies of Science Committee on Assessment of Resiliency and Prevention Programs for Mental and Behavioral Health in Service Members and Their Families.

He is past Chair of the Texas State Board of Examiners of Psychologists, past President of the Texas Psychological Association, past President of Division 12 Section VII of the American Psychological Association, past Past-President of the American Association of Suicidology, and a previous member of the APA Council of Representatives.

== Publications ==
=== Books ===
- Bryan, C.J., & Rudd, M.D. (2018). Brief Cognitive Therapy for Suicide Prevention. New York: Guilford Publishing.
- Bryan, C., & Rudd, M. D. (2011). Suicide Risk in Primary Care. New York: Springer Publishing.
- Conner, K., Carruth, B., Joe, S., Rudd, M. D., Teal, B. M., & Wines, J. D. (2009). Addressing Suicidal Thoughts and Behaviors with Clients in Substance Abuse Treatment. Washington, DC: Department of Health and Human Services (SAMHSA Treatment Improvement Protocol 50).
- Joiner, T. E., Witte, T., VanOrden, K., & Rudd, M. D. (2009). Clinical Work with Suicidal Patients: The Interpersonal-Psychological Theory of Suicidality as Guide. Washington, DC: American Psychological Association Press.
- Rudd, M. D., Joiner, T. E., & Rajab, M. H. (2004). Treating Suicidal Behavior. Guilford Publications: New York.
- Rudd, M. D. (2006). Assessing and Managing Suicidality: A Pocket Guide. Sarasota: Professional Resource Press.

=== Sample Peer-reviewed journal articles ===
- Rudd, M.D., & Bryan, C.J. (2021). The Brief Suicide Cognitions Scale: Development and clinical applications. Frontiers in Psychiatry, 14 September 2021 | The Brief Suicide Cognitions Scale: Development and Clinical Application.
- Rudd, M.D. (2021). Recognizing flawed assumptions in suicide risk assessment research and clinical practice. Psychological Medicine, First View, pp. 1 – 2, DOI: Recognizing flawed assumptions in suicide risk assessment research and clinical practice[Opens in a new window]
- Rudd, M. D., Bryan, C. J, Wertenberger, E., Peterson, A., Young-McCaughan, S., Mintz, J., Williams, S., Arner, K., Breitbach, J., Delano, K., Wilkinson, E., & Bruce, T. (2015). BCBT reduces post-treatment suicide attempts. American Journal of Psychiatry, Published online: February 13, 2015. doi: http://dx.doi.org/10.1176/appi.ajp.2014.14070843
- Bryan, C. J., Clemens, T. A., Leeson, B., & Rudd, M. D. (2015). Acute versus chronic stressors, multiple suicide attempts, and persistent suicidal ideation in U.S. Soldiers. Journal of Nervous and Mental Disease.
- Bryan, C. J., Rudd, M. D., Wertenberger, E., Young-McCaughon, S., & Peterson, A. (2015). Nonsuicidal self-injury as a prospective predictor of suicide attempts in a clinical sample of military personnel. Comprehensive Psychiatry, Published online: July 10, 2014. doi: http://dx.doi.org/10.1016/j.comppsych.2014.07.009
- Ribeiro, J. D., Buchman, B. A., Bender, T. W., Nock, M. K., Rudd, M. D., Bryan, C. J., Lim, I. C., Baker, M. T., Knight, C., & Joiner, T. E. (2014). An investigation of interactive effects of the acquired capability for suicide and acute agitation on suicidality in a military sample. Depression and Anxiety. Article first published online: February 22, 2014. doi:10.1002/da.22240
- Bryan, C. J., Rudd, M. D., Wertenberger, E., Etienne, N., Ray-Sannerud, B. N., Morrow, C. E., Peterson, A. L., Young-McCaughon, S. (2014). Improving the detection and prediction of suicidal behavior among military personnel by measuring suicidal beliefs: An evaluation of the Suicide Cognitions Scale. Journal of Affective Disorders, 159: 15-22. doi:10.1016/j.jad.2014.02.021 Epub February 19, 2014.
- Rudd, M. D. (2014). An effective model for managing teen suicide risk. PsycCritiques, 59 (26), Article 3.

== Family ==
Rudd is married to Loretta Rudd.
