= Xiangen Hu =

Professor Xiangen Hu
- 胡祥恩
- Citizenship: United States
- Known for: Cognitive Psychology, Research Design and Statistics, Artificial Intelligence, Intelligent Tutoring

Chinese name
- Traditional Chinese: 胡祥恩
- Simplified Chinese: 胡祥恩
Transcriptions
Standard Mandarin
- Hanyu Pinyin: Hú Xiángēn
Yue: Cantonese
- Jyutping: wu4 cheung4 yan1
- Website: www.xiangenhu.info

Xiangen Hu is a Chinese-American psychologist and computer scientist. He is currently a chair professor of Learning Sciences and Technologies at Department of Applied Social Science, The Hong Kong Polytechnic University. He is also the director of Institute for Higher Education Research and Development and Educational Research Center of The Hong Kong Polytechnic University.

Hu is a professor emeritus of Department of Psychology, The University of Memphis (UofM), where he was a professor in the Departments of Psychology, Electrical and Computer Engineering, and Computer Science for 30 years, and also worked as a senior researcher at the Institute for Intelligent Systems (IIS). Meanwhile, Hu has been appointed professor and dean of the School of Psychology in the Central China Normal University since 2016 on a visiting basis where he has established good connections with mainland China. He also used to work as a senior researcher at the Key Laboratory of Adolescent Cyberpsychology and Behavior, backed by the Chinese Ministry of Education.

Hu is also an Advisor of EmoBay, a Hong Kong-based startup.

== Background ==
Hu obtained an MS in applied mathematics from Huazhong University of Science and Technology in 1985. He then completed an MA in social science in 1991 and Ph.D. in cognitive sciences in 1993 - both at the University of California, Irvine.

Hu is a co-director of the Advanced Distributed Learning (ADL) center. As a member of the ADL Initiative, Hu was one of the first proponents of SCORM. He is also employed as a senior researcher in the Chinese Ministry of Education.

Hu is a contributor to the Handbook of Latent Semantic Analysis.
