= Bill Hardgrave =

American academic administrator

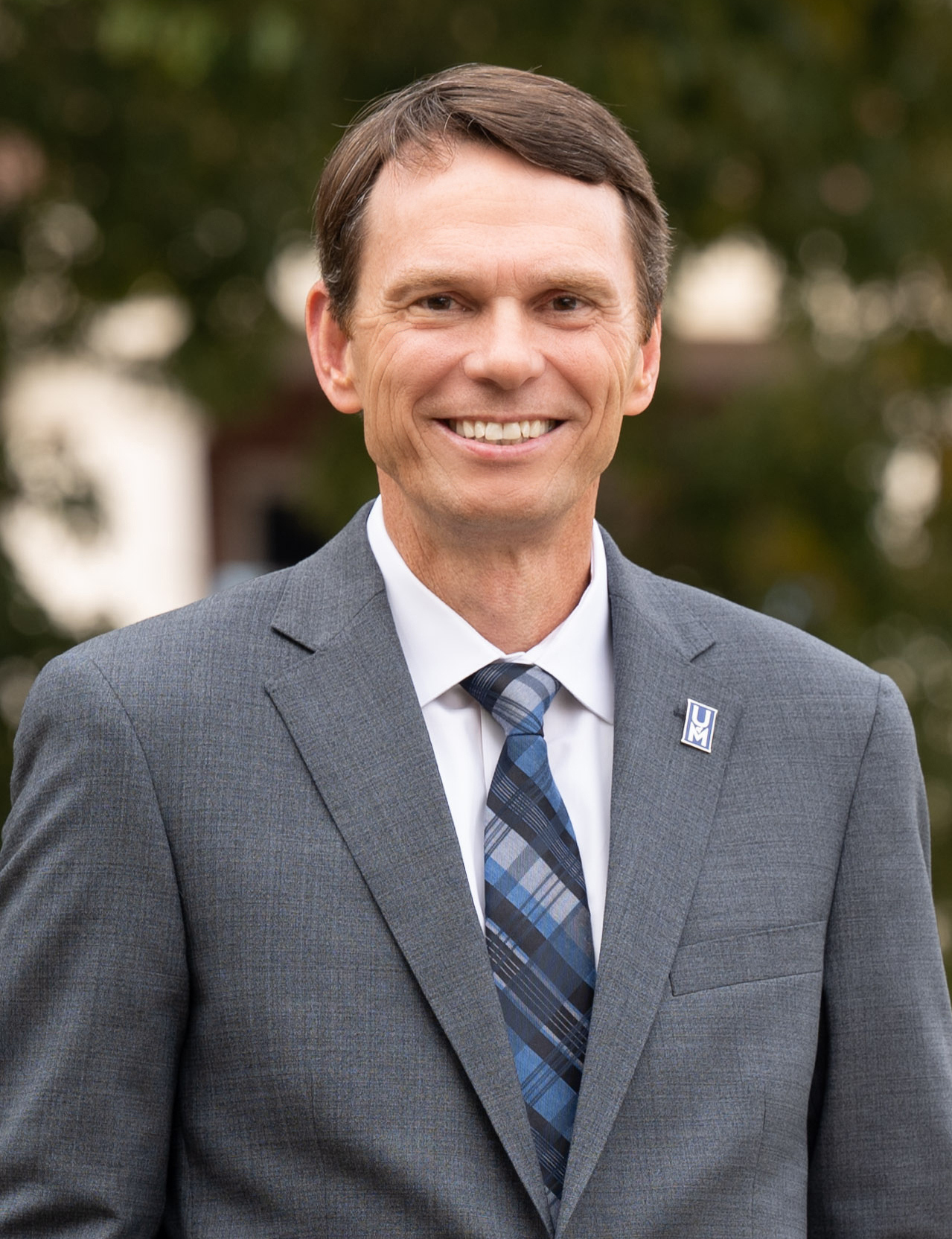

13th President of University of Memphis
- Incumbent
- Assumed office April 1, 2022
- Preceded by: M. David Rudd

Personal details
- Education: Arkansas Tech University (BS); Missouri State University (MBA); Oklahoma State University (PhD)
- Website: Office of the President

Bill Hardgrave is an American academic administrator who currently serves as the president of the University of Memphis, a role he has held since April 1, 2022. He was previously the provost and vice president for academic affairs at Auburn University. Prior to his time at Auburn, he served as the Bradberry Chair in Information Systems in the Sam M. Walton College of Business at the University of Arkansas.

== Background ==
Hardgrave graduated from Arkansas Tech University in 1987 with a bachelor of science in Computer Science. In 1990, he received an MBA with an emphasis in Computer Information Systems from Missouri State University. Hardgrave graduated from Oklahoma State University with a PhD in Management Information Systems in 1993.

== Career ==
From 2001-10, Hardgrave served as the Bradberry Chair in Information Systems in the Sam M. Walton College of Business at the University of Arkansas. In 1999, he established the Information Technology Research Institute at Arkansas, serving as the institute's executive director. During his time at Arkansas, he founded and directed the RFID Research Center, serving in that role from 2005-10.

Hardgrave became the dean of Auburn University’s Harbert College of Business in August 2010, a role he held through December 2017. During his time, Hardgrave oversaw growth in areas such as student enrollment, undergraduate/graduate programs and student/faculty resources. In 2013, Hardgrave secured the then-largest donation in the history of Auburn University with a $40 million gift from Raymond J. Harbert. The Harbert family followed that donation with a $15 million contribution three years later to help fund a new graduate business building, which was named Horton-Hardgrave Hall in honor of Hardgrave and George Horton, two former Auburn University deans.

Hardgrave oversaw the founding of the Auburn University Radio Frequency Identification (RFID) lab, the Geospatial Research and Applications Center and the Center for Supply Chain Innovation. Hardgrave's time as the Harbert College of Business dean also saw the creation of a Business Analytics undergraduate major, a PhD program in Finance and an online MS in Finance. Hardgrave's leadership led the Harbert College of Business to receive external validation of several of its programs, highlighted by Top 10 national rankings for the undergraduate Supply Chain Management and online MBA programs, online Master of Accountancy and online MS in both Finance and Information Systems.

Hardgrave was named Auburn's Provost and Senior Vice President for Academic Affairs in January 2018. His time in the role saw him lead Auburn’s 12 colleges and schools, including the College of Veterinary Medicine and School of Pharmacy, while overseeing academic resources, support units and instructional research programs and managing the procedures for faculty recruitment, appointments, promotions and tenure during his time as provost.

On November 9, 2021, the University of Memphis Board of Trustees announced Hardgrave as the university's next president. He began his tenure on April 1, 2022.

== Research ==
Hardgrave's research career has seen him be awarded two patents and publish five books, as well as over 85 articles. Several of Hardgrave's publications came in leading journals such as MIS Quarterly, Production & Operations Management, Journal of Management Information Systems and the European Journal of Information Systems. Hardgrave's research has been cited by The Wall Street Journal, CNN, BusinessWeek and The NewsHour with Jim Lehrer, among others.

In May 2009 while working as the executive director of the RFID Research Center at Arkansas, Hardgrave received the Ted Williams Award from AIM Global as the most influential researcher in the field of RFID. In 2013, he was awarded the Special Achievement award from the RFID Journal for his overall impact on the field. Hardgrave has delivered nearly 200 invited talks worldwide to a total audience of more than 35,000 people.

== Family ==
Hardgrave and his wife Ronda have two children, Rachel and Gavin.
