= Edmund Warren Perry Jr. =

American dramatist

- Born: Memphis, Tennessee, United States
- Occupation: Writer
- Writing career
- Genres: Plays, fiction, nonfiction
- Website: www.ewarrenperryjr.com

Edmund Warren Perry Jr. was an American writer of both creative and nonfiction work and a museum professional with expertise in American history, popular culture, and literature. Perry was the author of two published plays - Swift to My Wounded: Walt Whitman and the Civil War, published by the Smithsonian National Portrait Gallery (2009), and "The Sitters," published in The Best of the Strawberry One Acts, Volume Four (2007). Perry also wrote for the Smithsonian National Portrait Gallery, and he has been a curator and co-curator for two notable exhibitions for the Smithsonian: the 2010 National Portrait Gallery exhibition "One Life: Echoes of Elvis," and the Smithsonian traveling exhibition, "Elvis at 21: Photographs by Alfred Wertheimer." He edited and contributed to Echoes of Elvis: The Cultural Legacy of Elvis Presley, winner of a 2013 Smithsonian Secretary's Research Prize, and he was a co-author of the book Elvis 1956: Photographs by Alfred Wertheimer which accompanied the Elvis at 21 exhibition on its tour from 2010 to 2014. Elvis 1956 received ForeWord Review's Book of the Year Bronze award for adult nonfiction/music writing in 2009.

== Life and work ==
Perry is a native of Memphis, Tennessee. His early work in museums was as a planetarium coordinator for the Memphis Museums, Incorporated system, a division of the Memphis Park Commission. Perry—with engineer Neal Smith and sound engineer Luther Bradfute—was responsible for the daily operation of the Memphis Pink Palace Planetarium, under the direction of George Brown. During this time, Perry co-produced the first Elvis light show in a permanent laser institution. He titled the show "Elvis: Legacy in Light," and it was a sanctioned event of Elvis International Tribute Week from 1982 until 2004 when the planetarium was temporarily closed.

Perry served as a special assistant and logistics administrator for the Memphis Wonders series from 1991 to 1993. Among the exhibitions he assisted in bringing to the city were "Splendors of the Ottoman Sultans," (1992), and "Napoleon: Wonders in Association with the French Museum System and Other Major Collections" (1993). These large scale "blockbuster" style exhibitions brought in excess of 1.3 million tourists from 1991 to 1993 during the first administration of Mayor W. W. Herenton. Beginning in 1994, Perry served as a logistics and project manager for the Knoxville Museum of Art and its "The Passion of Rodin" exhibition, a show which had a $1 million impact on the local economy. It was the largest cultural exposition that city hosted in the period after the 1982 World's Fair.

Perry has taught at the University of Memphis, the University of Mary Washington, and The Catholic University of America, including courses in literature, drama, writing, and art history. He has worked for museums across the United States, including the Memphis Pink Palace Museum, WONDERS: the Memphis International Cultural Series, the Dixon Gallery and Gardens, the Knoxville Museum of Art, and the Smithsonian National Portrait Gallery. Perry was awarded the Smithsonian Secretary's Research Prize in 2013 for his symposium proceeding: Echoes of Elvis: The Cultural Legacy of Elvis Presley In recent years, he has given talks by invitation at the National Civil War Museum, Harrisburg, PA (2014), the National Portrait Gallery (Australia) (2014), the National Gallery of Australia (National Visual Arts Education Conference, 2014), the Institut Français du Japon - Kansai, Kyoto, Japan (2015), and the National Museum of Western Art, Tokyo, Japan (2015). Beginning in 2016, he was a contract curator for the American Museum of Science and Energy at Oak Ridge, Tennessee.

Perry holds graduate degrees in medieval literature and creative writing from the University of Memphis (2000) and in drama from The Catholic University of America, where he graduated from the MFA playwriting program (2006). His plays have been staged with Yellow Taxi Productions (2006, Manchester, NH), the Strawberry One Act Festival (2006, 2007, 2008, NY), the Samuel French Off Off Broadway Festival (2004, NY) and the National Portrait Gallery's "Cultures in Motion" project (2006, 2007, 2008, 2011, Washington DC). In August 2006, he received the award for Best Director at the Strawberry One Act Festival where "The Sitters" was nominated for every award in the program.

He was married to Shannon Kennedy Perry; they had one child, Jeanne Lynn, and one dog, Oxford. He died June 17, 2019.

== Critical reception ==
In December 2009, Perry was quoted in Vanity Fair in an article describing the Smithsonian tour of the Wertheimer photos. In 2010, the exhibition curated by Perry called One Life: Echoes of Elvis received much positive attention worldwide. On January 8, 2010, Perry was cited as one of twelve Time magazine "Quotes of the Day" when he said, "Everybody needs to have a moment with Elvis." "Echoes of Elvis" received praise and treatment from National Public Radio's Weekend All Things Considered, Voice of America, the Washington Post, ARTnews, and scores of news outlets around the world.
