= Mary McDonald (composer) =

American classical composer

Mary McDonald (born 1956) is an American composer, arranger, producer, pianist, and organist.

== Early years ==
Mary McDonald showed an early talent for music, playing hymns by ear by age five. She graduated from Carson-Newman College in East Tennessee in 1978 and took her first position as an organist at Beaver Dam Baptist Church in Knoxville. She was self-taught as a keyboard player and did not read music well, so improvised the music. With her husband's help, McDonald transcribed tapes of the services which were accepted for publication in Pedalpoint Magazine. With the encouragement of music publisher John Purifoy, she composed her first choral anthem in 1983.

== Career ==
Besides composing, McDonald works as a choral clinician throughout the United States, conducting workshops. In 1985 she took a position as accompanist for the Tennessee Men’s Chorale. In 2000 she served as the first woman President of the Southern Baptist Church Music Conference. McDonald worked as a sacred choral editor for The Lorenz Corporation for nearly twenty years and continues to work for them as a consultant. She also serves as the organist for Central Baptist Church in Knoxville, Tennessee.

McDonald is a member of the American Guild of Organists (AGO) and the American Society of Composers, Authors and Publishers (ASCAP). She received a second place award from the John Ness Beck Foundation for her composition "Yes, My Jesus Loves Me."

== Personal life ==
Mary and her husband, architect Brian McDonald, live in Dandridge, Tennessee. They have two married children and seven grandchildren.

== Works ==
McDonald is prolific as a composer. She has published over 1700 choral anthems, cantatas and keyboard collections. Selected compositions include:

- "Seek First the Kingdom"
- "Yes, My Jesus Loves Me"
- "Then Sings My Soul"
- "Jesus Is the Living Stone"
- "All Because of the Wonderful Cross"
- "Be Still"
- "Immortal, Invisible God"
- "You Alone are God"
- "Only God"
- ”America”
- ”Hymn of Peace”
- ”This Is the Dream” (Carnegie Hall Premiere)
- ”Sing and Be Not Silent”
- ”I Will Make All Things New”
- ”I Must Tell Jesus with Blessed Assurance”
- ”Sing Forth His Glorious Name”
