= Jennifer R. Mandel =

American biologist

- Other name: Jennifer Rhea Ellis
- Education: Carson–Newman University (B.A.); Vanderbilt University (Ph.D.)
- Scientific career
- Fields: Plant biology
- Workplaces: University of Memphis
- Thesis: Conservation Genetics of the Endangered Sunflower Helianthus verticillatus (2008)
- Doctoral advisor: David E. McCauley

Jennifer R. Mandel is an American biologist. Mandel is an associate professor of biological sciences at the University of Memphis.

== Education ==
Jennifer Rhea Ellis earned a Bachelor of Arts in biology from Carson–Newman University with a focus in organismal biology, ecology, and natural history. She completed a Doctor of Philosophy in biological sciences from Vanderbilt University specializing in plant conservation and evolutionary genetics. Her dissertation, Conservation Genetics of the Endangered Sunflower Helianthus verticillatus elevated the Whorled sunflower to a high priority candidate for endangered species status. Her doctoral advisor was David E. McCauley. Mandel completed post-doctoral research in plant biology at University of Georgia. Her research focused on the identification of the genetic basis of evolutionary and agronomically important traits in sunflowers.

== Career ==
In 2014, Mandel joined the departments of biological sciences and bioinformatics at University of Memphis as an assistant professor.
