= WKNO =

WKNO may refer to:

- WKNO (TV), a television station (channel 10 analog/29 digital) licensed to Memphis, Tennessee, United States
- WKNO-FM, a radio station (91.1 FM) licensed to Memphis, Tennessee, United States
