= University of Memphis =

Public university in Memphis, Tennessee, US

The University of Memphis
- Former names: Memphis State University (1957–1994); Memphis State College (1941–1957); West Tennessee State Teachers College (1925–1941); West Tennessee State Normal School (1912–1925)
- Motto: Latin: Imaginari cogitare facere
- Motto in English: "To imagine, to think, to do"
- Type: Public research university
- Established: September 10, 1912; 114 years ago
- Accreditation: SACS
- Academic affiliations: GCU; ORAU; USU
- Endowment: $413 million (2025)
- President: Bill Hardgrave
- Faculty: 930
- Administrative staff: 1,570
- Students: 20,276
- Undergraduates: 16,703
- Postgraduates: 5,209
- Location: Memphis, Tennessee, United States; 35°07′08″N 89°56′14″W
- Campus: 1,160 acres (4.7 km^{2}); Large city
- Newspaper: The Daily Helmsman
- Colors: Blue and gray
- Nickname: Tigers
- Sporting affiliations: NCAA Division I FBS – The American; GARC
- Mascots: TOM III (Formally Live Tiger - deceased September 18, 2020); Pouncer (costume)
- Website: memphis.edu

The University of Memphis (U of M or Memphis) is a public research university in Memphis, Tennessee, United States. Founded in 1912, the university has an enrollment of more than 20,000 students.

The university maintains the Herff College of Engineering, the Center for Earthquake Research and Information (CERI), the Cecil C. Humphreys School of Law, the School of Communication Sciences and Disorders, the former Lambuth University campus in Jackson, Tennessee (now a branch campus of the University of Memphis and host campus of the Doctor of Physical Therapy program), the Loewenberg College of Nursing, the School of Public Health, the College of Communication and Fine Arts, the FedEx Institute of Technology, the Advanced Distributed Learning Workforce Co-Lab, and the Institute of Egyptian Art and Archaeology. The University of Memphis is classified among "R1: Doctoral Universities – Very High research activity".

== History ==
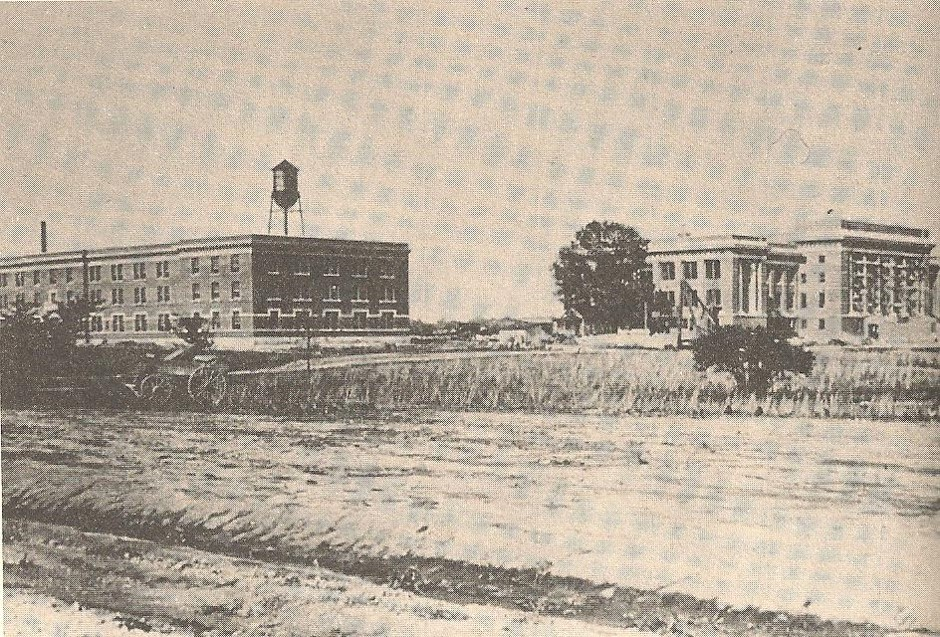
Mynders Hall (left) and the Administration Building (right) at the West Tennessee State Normal School in 1911

In 1909, the Tennessee Legislature enacted the General Education Bill. This bill stated that three colleges be established, one within each grand division of the state, and one additional school for African-American students. After much bidding and campaigning, the state had to choose between two sites to build the new college for West Tennessee: Jackson and Memphis. Memphis was chosen, one of the main reasons being the proximity of the rail line to the site proposed to build the new college for West Tennessee. This would allow professors and students to go home and visit their relatives. The other three schools established through the General Education Act evolved into East Tennessee State University (ETSU), Middle Tennessee State University (MTSU), and Tennessee State University (TSU).

Prior to the establishment of the West Tennessee State Normal School pursuant to the General Education Bill, a number of higher education departments existed in Memphis under the banner of the University of Memphis. This earlier University of Memphis was formed in 1909 by adding to an already existing medical school's departments of pharmacy, dentistry, and law.

On September 10, 1912, West Tennessee State Normal School opened in Memphis; its first president was Seymour A. Mynders. By 1913 all departments of the earlier University of Memphis, except the law school, had been taken over by West Tennessee State Normal School. After Mynders' death in 1913, John Willard Brister was chosen to take his place. After Brister's resignation in 1918, Andrew A. Kincannon became president. In 1924, Brister returned to his post as president of the school.

The name changed in 1925 to West Tennessee State Teachers College. In 1931, the campus' first newspaper, The Tiger Rag, was established. In 1939, Richard C. Jones became president of WTSTC. In 1941, the name was changed to Memphis State College, when the college expanded its liberal arts curriculum. In 1943, Jennings B. Sanders succeeded Jones as president. Three years later, the first alumnus to become president, J. Millard (Jack) Smith, was appointed. In 1951, MSC awarded its first B.A. degree. In 1957 the school received full University status and changed its name accordingly to Memphis State University.

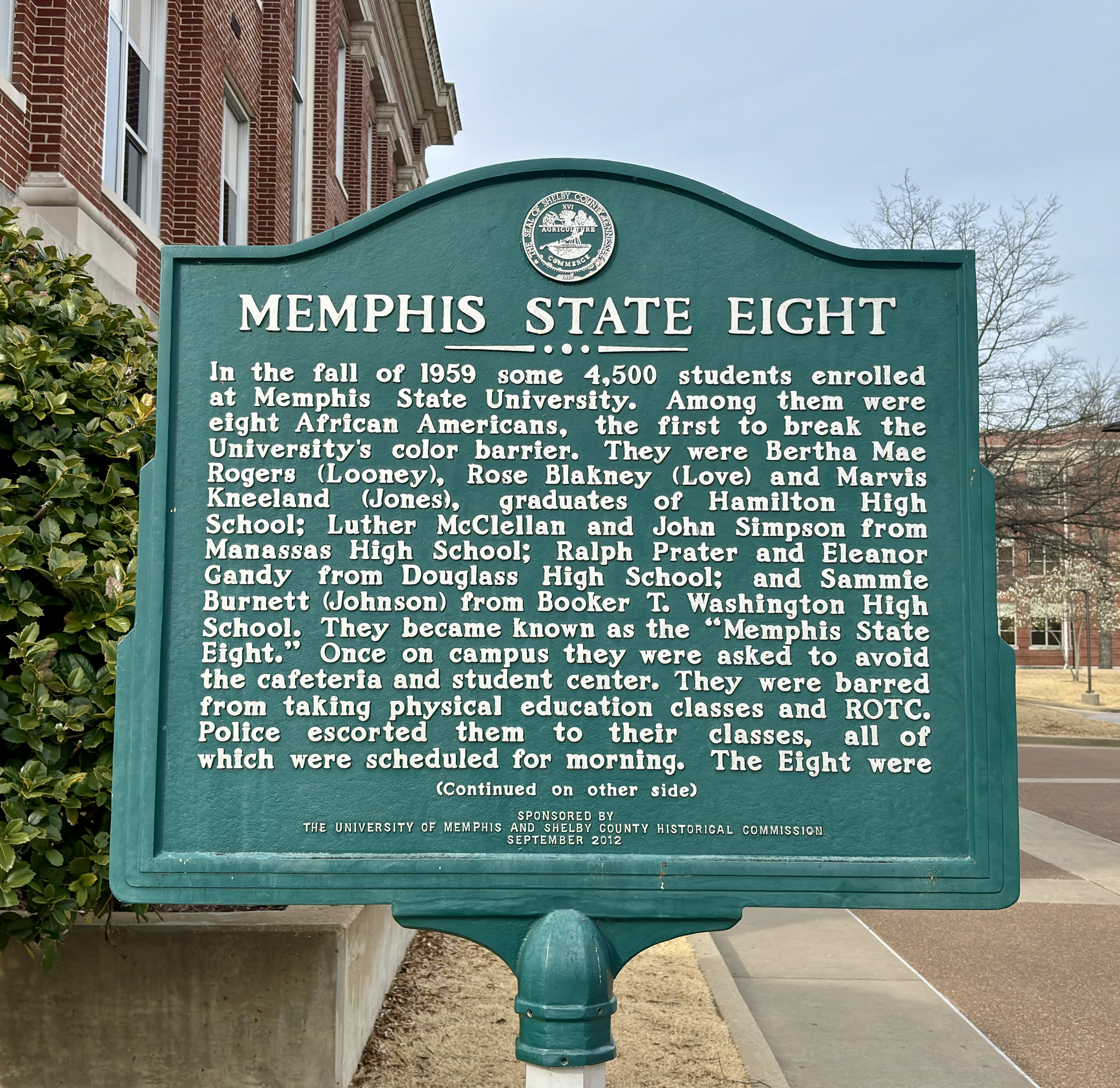
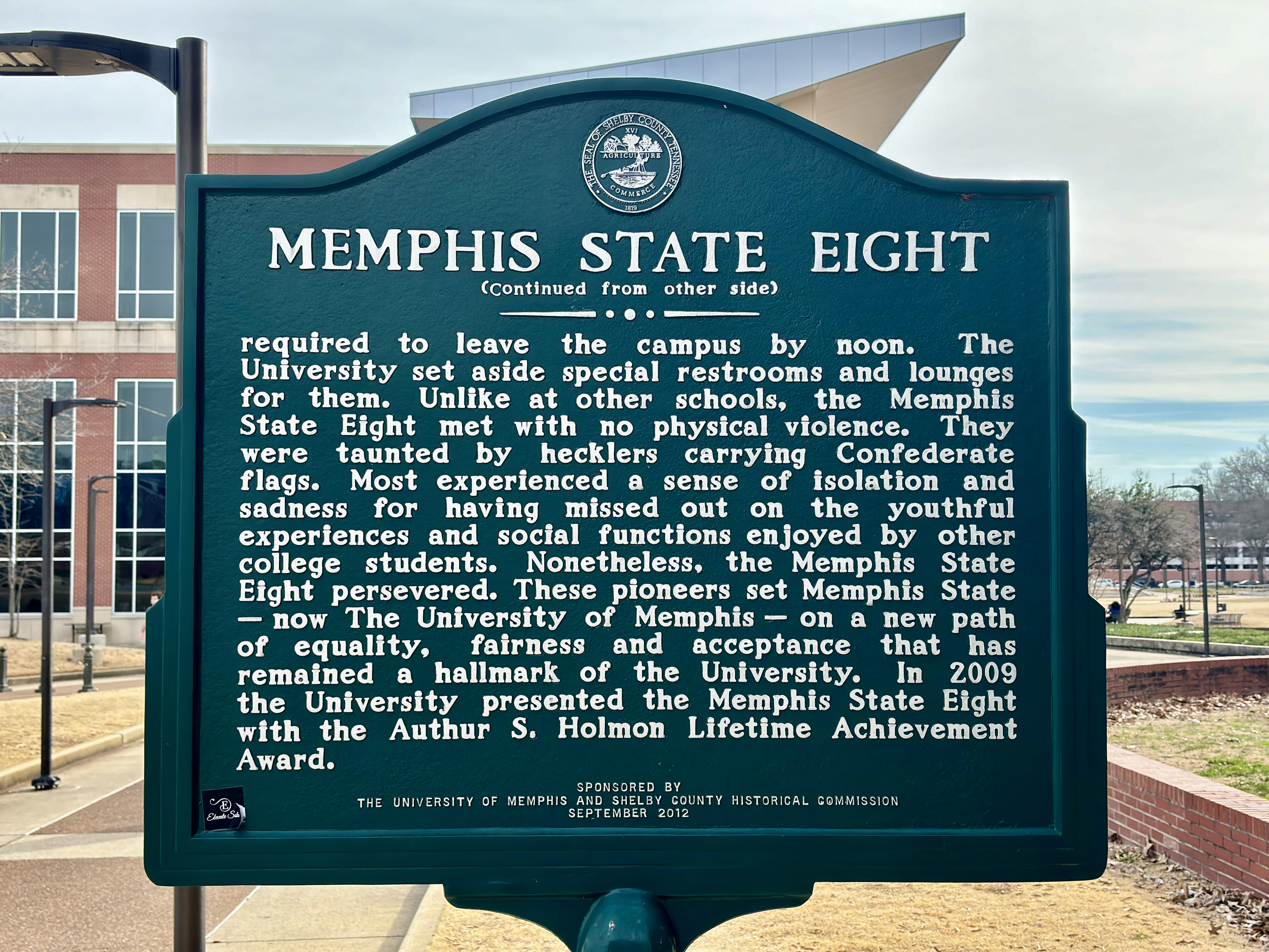
Historical marker on campus honoring the Memphis State Eight

In 1959, five years after Brown v. Board of Education was decided by the Supreme Court of the United States, holding that racial segregation in public education was unconstitutional, the university admitted its first black students. Racial segregation was the norm throughout the South at the time. The Memphis State Eight, as they were known, were admitted to Memphis State University. Their presence on campus was the focus not only of intense media scrutiny but also of severe criticism from much of the local public. Ostensibly for the black students' safety and to maintain an air of calm on campus, university administrators placed certain stringent restrictions on where and when the black students could be. They were to go to class and leave campus right after, avoiding public areas like the cafeteria. These limitations were lifted after the novelty of their presence on campus had subsided, the public's focus on them had lessened, and as more black students were admitted to the university, all such social restrictions were dropped. Today, black students make up more than one-third of the campus student body and participate in all campus activities.

Cecil C. Humphreys became president of MSU, succeeding Smith, in 1960. In 1966, the school began awarding doctoral degrees. Humphreys resigned as MSU president to become the first chancellor of the newly formed State University and Community College System, later renamed the Tennessee Board of Regents. John Richardson was appointed interim president.

In 1973, Billy Mac Jones became president. Also that year, the Memphis State Tigers men's basketball team reached the finals of the NCAA tournament, only to fall at the hands of a UCLA team led by future NBA superstar and Basketball Hall of Famer Bill Walton in the NCAA Basketball Championship Game in St. Louis, Missouri. Thomas Carpenter assumed the presidency of MSU in 1980, and V. Lane Rawlins succeeded him in 1991. On July 1, 1994, Memphis State University changed its name again, to the current University of Memphis.

V. Lane Rawlins served from 1991 to 2000; Ralph Faudree filled in as interim president for one year after V. Lane Rawlins' departure. In 2001, The U of M installed its first female president, Shirley Raines, who retired in the summer of 2013. During her tenure (in 2008), the Tigers men's basketball team again reached the NCAA Finals, only to later have the appearance vacated after an NCAA investigation. After a yearlong search, M. David Rudd was confirmed as the 12th president on May 1, 2014. In the spring semester of 2020, the university joined thousands of other institutions and made a mid-semester shift to online classes as a result of the COVID-19 pandemic, and also introduced a credit/no credit grade option in lieu of the traditional grading scale for that semester.

== Campus ==
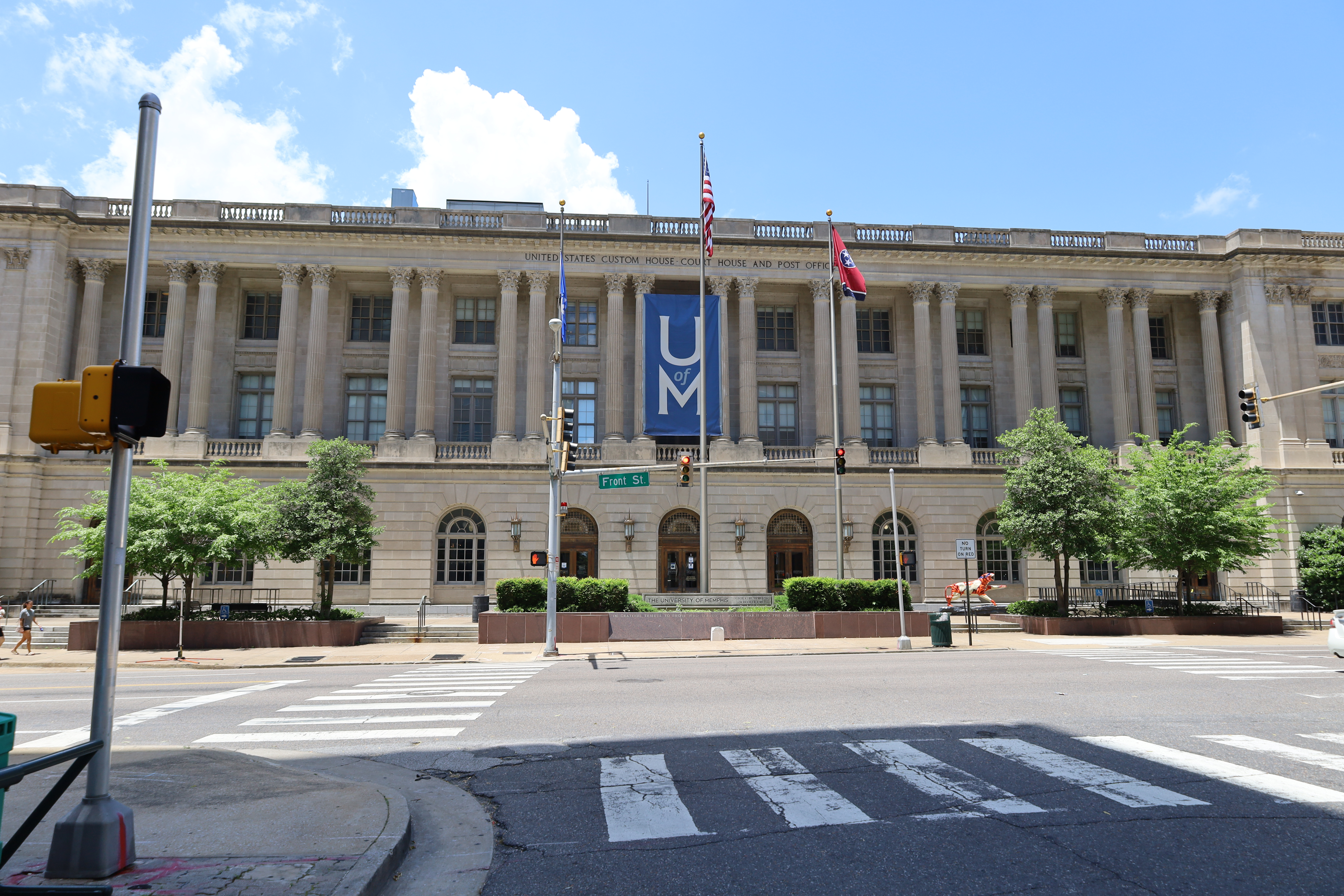
The Cecil C. Humphreys School of Law, a former United States federal courthouse, opened in 2010.

The University of Memphis campus is located approximately 5 miles (8.0 km) east of downtown in the University District neighborhood of east Memphis. It has an area of 1,160 acres (4.7 km^{2}), although this figure does not include the law school in the former United States federal customshouse in downtown Memphis, which opened in January 2010. The historic core of campus encompasses approximately 30 acres (120,000 m^{2}).

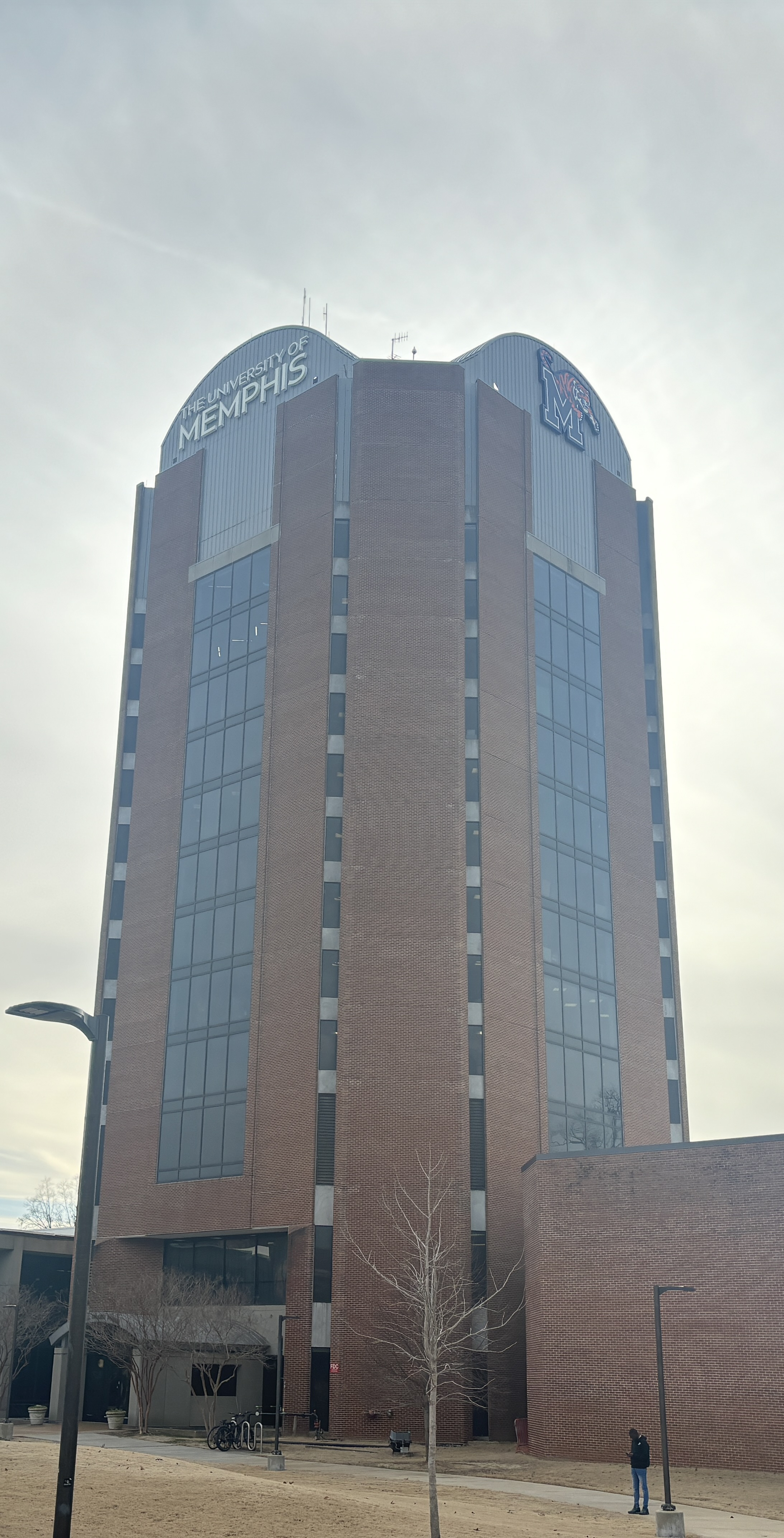
Wilder Tower; the tallest building of the university's main campus

Campus planners have significantly increased the amount of green space and the number of walkways over the past several years while maintaining the original historic architecture of the campus.

Surrounding the university's main campus are several historic neighborhoods to the north and east, as well as the University District neighborhood and the commercial Highland Strip to the west. Many University of Memphis college students also reside in housing south of the main campus.

=== Layout ===
The University of Memphis campus is set out in a rectilinear format, planned as a geometric design similar to the Jeffersonian style of the University of Virginia.

Despite the gradual expansion of the campus to the West and South, it is fairly compact and retains a park-like, tree-lined setting. The farthest distance on campus takes about twenty-five minutes to walk. According to the most recent master plan, the University of Memphis is projected to expand and redevelop additional areas one block west of the main campus' current western boundary of Patterson St., making Highland Avenue the "de facto" entrance to the university.

=== Main Campus ===
Students walking in front of Manning Hall

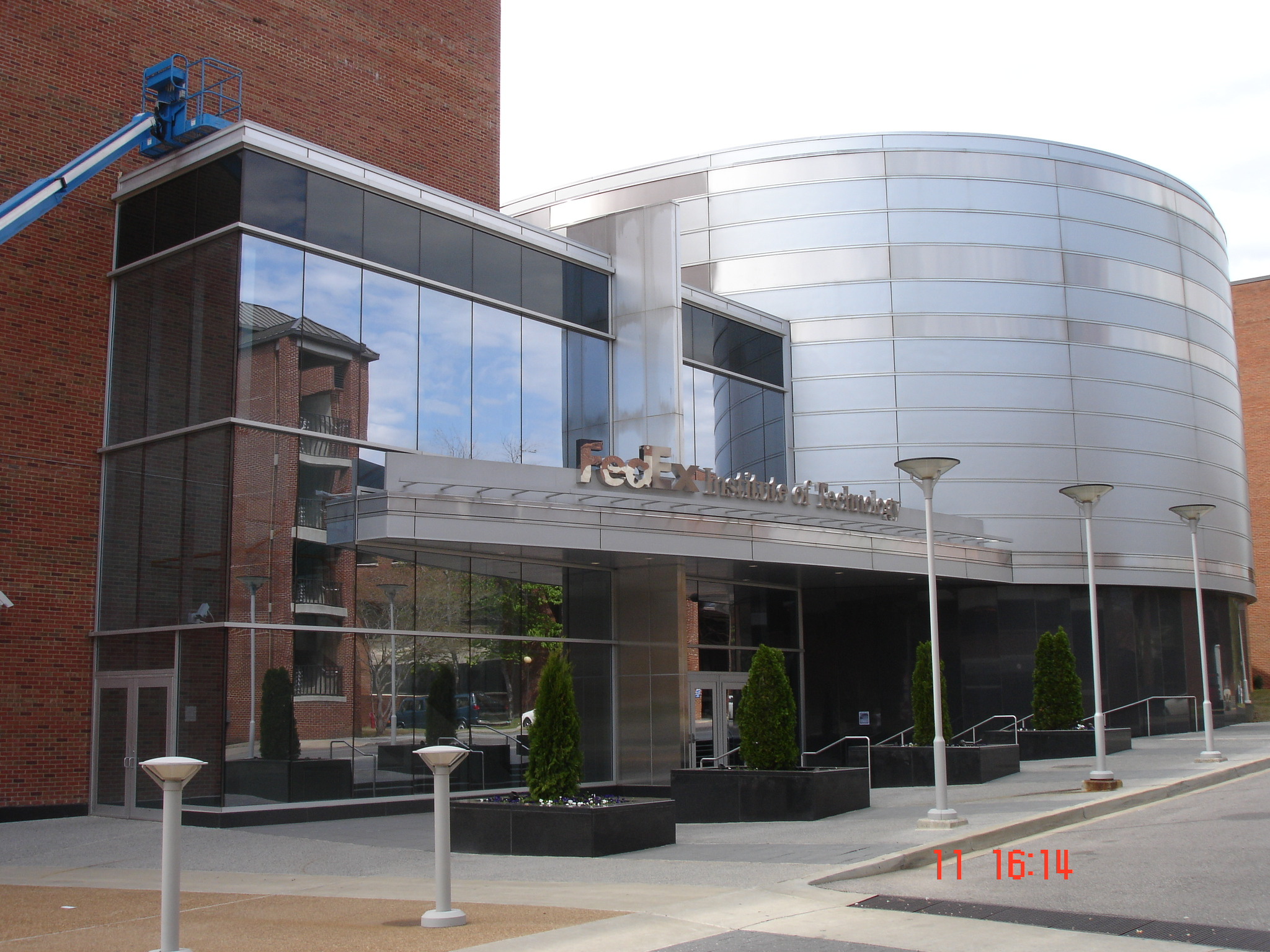
The FedEx Institute of Technology is a major research contributor in the areas of Supply Chain Management, robotics, and intelligent systems.

The center of the main campus comprises buildings that made up the original campus. The first college buildings, including Scates Hall, Manning Hall, Mynders Hall, and Administration Building, were erected in the early 20th century. This section stretches from Patterson St. south to the end of the main campus at Walker Ave., with most buildings surrounding Alumni Mall and Student Plaza. The majority of the buildings of the arts and humanities departments, as well as those of the Physics and Astronomy departments of the College of Arts and Sciences, are located in the original areas of campus.

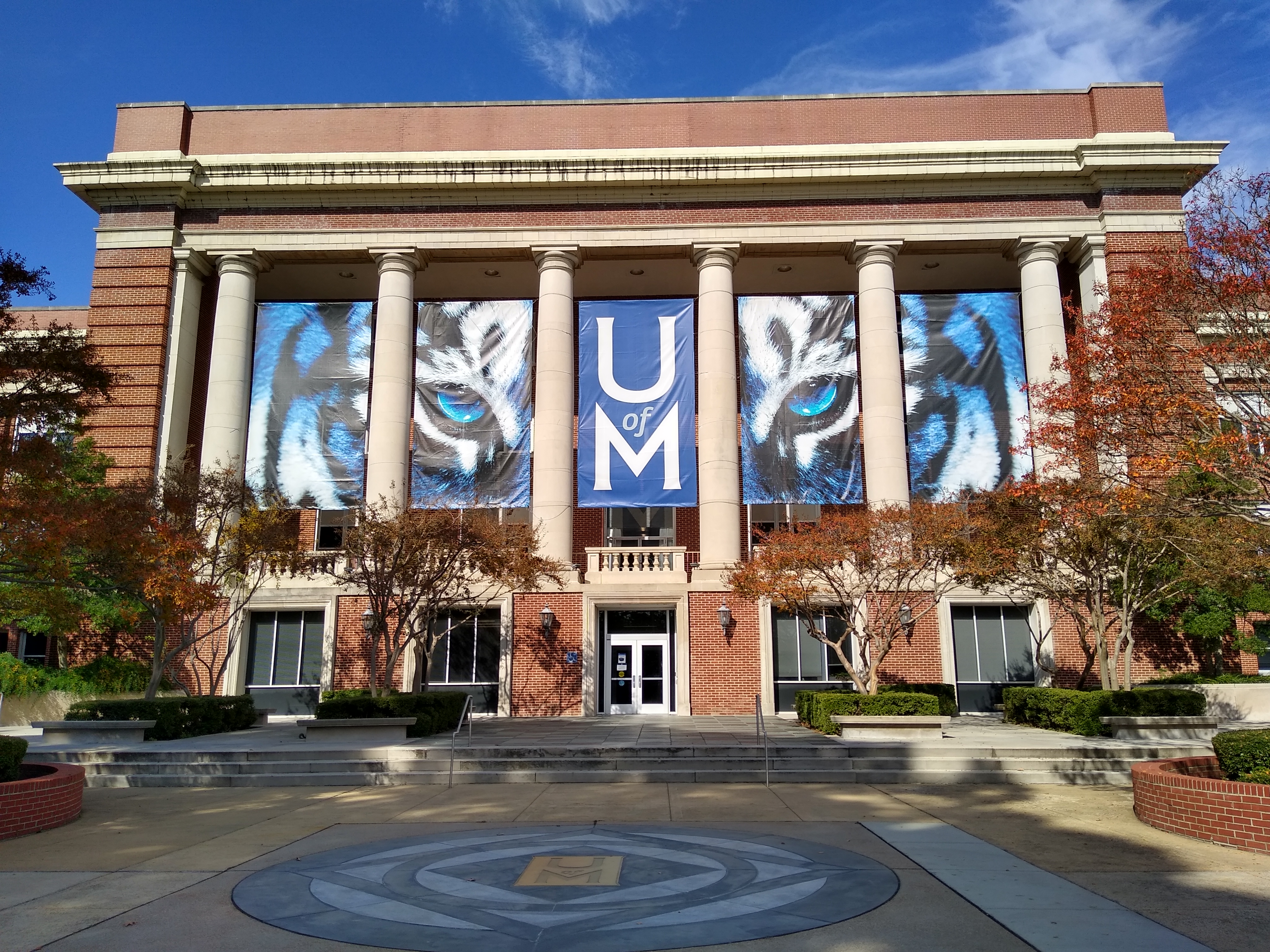
The Administration Building at the University of Memphis

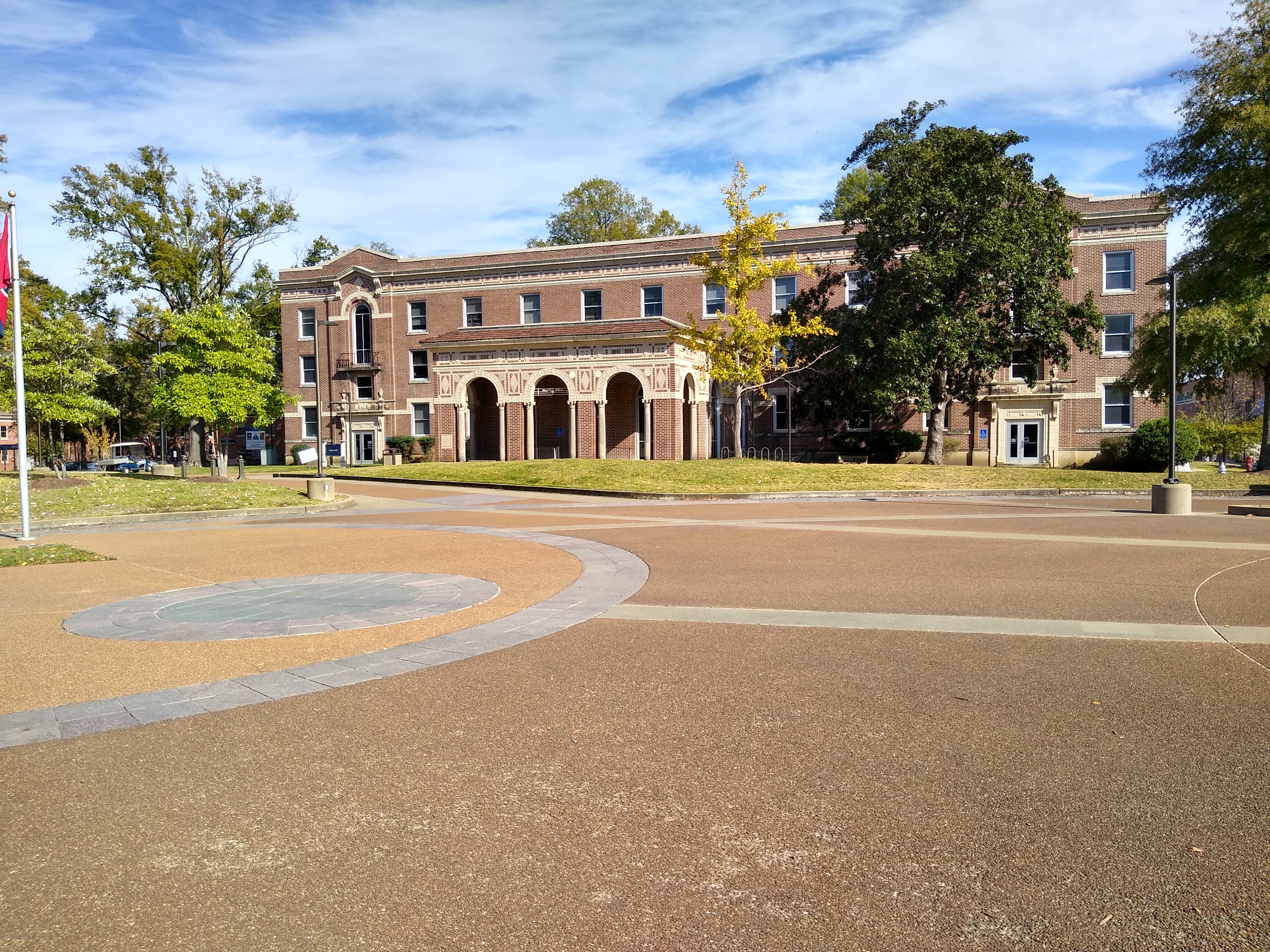
Scates Hall, the third oldest building on campus

Flanking the original area of campus to the east are the areas of major research for The Life Sciences and Engineering departments, including J.M. Smith Hall, the Life Sciences Building, and the Herff College of Engineering Complex, as well as the College of Education, residing in E.C. Ball Hall, and the Art Museum of the University of Memphis, located in the Communication and Fine Arts Building. The Ned R. McWherter Library, a state-of-the-art library facility and one of the premier research libraries of the Mid-South United States, takes up the eastern part of the campus adjacent to Dunavant Plaza and Emeriti Grove.

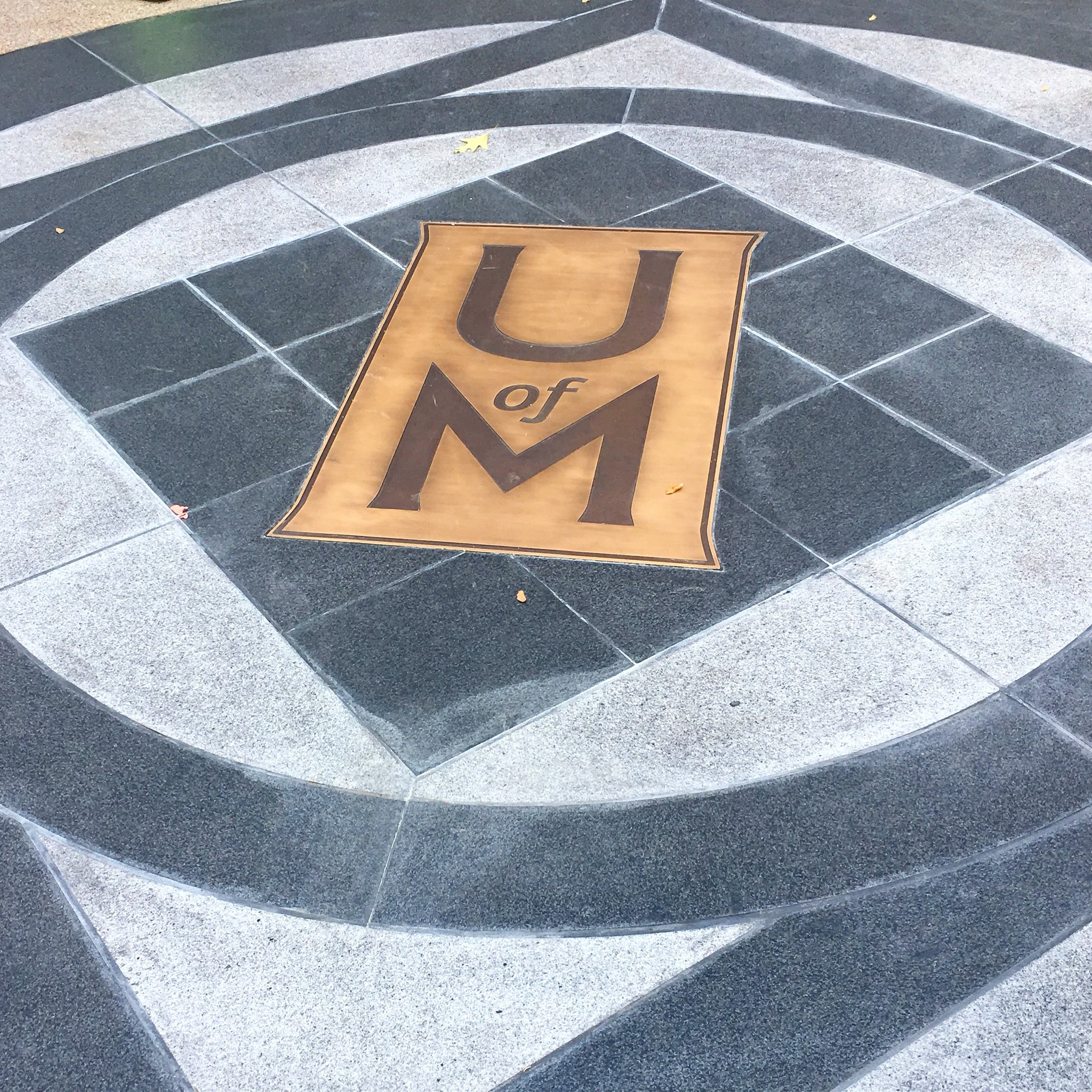
UofM "Columns" Plaque

The northwestern area of the main campus includes The Fogelman College of Business and Economics, The Fogelman Executive Center (a major conference center for regional executives visiting The University of Memphis that is now mainly occupied by the University Middle School, with plans to incorporate a predecessor to a High School education completing the long dreamt of k-college experience), and The FedEx Institute of Technology, a major research contributor in the areas of Supply Chain Management, Nanotechnology, Robotics and Intelligent Systems. Originally, at the north end of the campus, Norriswood Avenue formed the northern boundary. The campus expanded into this residential area in the late 1960s and early 1970s.

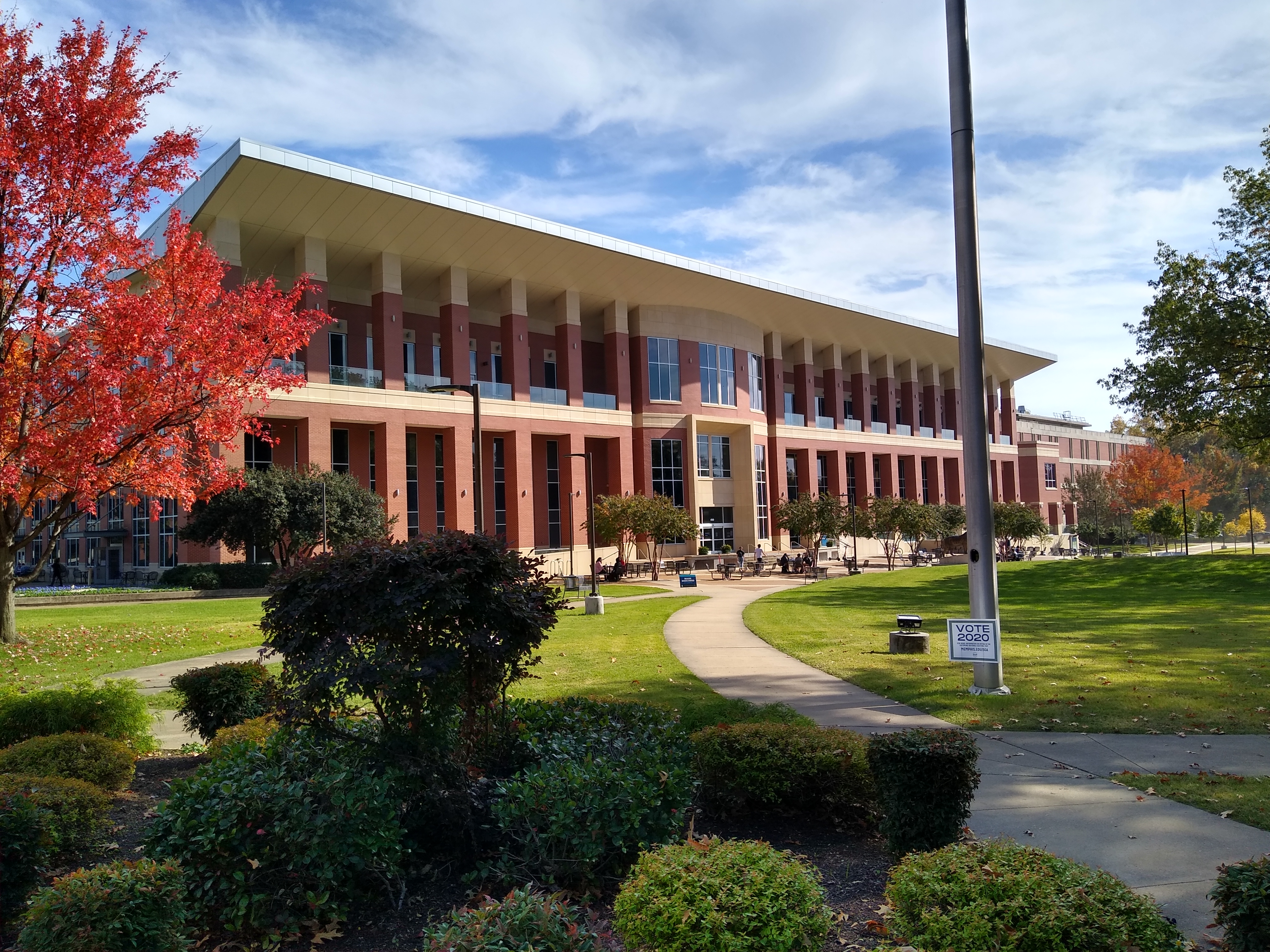
University Center at the University of Memphis

The western edge and southwest corner include Johnson Hall (comprising the Geography and Geology Departments), Patterson Hall (housing the English department), John S. Wilder Tower (formerly Brister Tower), Greek Row, and the bulk of The University of Memphis residence halls. As The University of Memphis presses ahead with its planned expansion, many more facilities, pedestrian access, and green spaces will also be created with the renovation and development of the current residential block west of Patterson St. in the University District neighborhood.

On January 29, 2013, Governor Bill Haslam announced a $44.6 million state budget pledge for the Community Health Building, which is the new home of The Loewenberg College of Nursing and The School of Communication Sciences and Disorders. The University of Memphis was required to raise $15 million from private funds to match the state funds.

In 2017, the university announced plans for a new Veterans Care Center on campus. Located in the Psychological Services Center on campus, the Veterans Care Center "will address the mental health needs of veterans, regardless of era, gender, discharge status or service connection."

In 2019, the university opened the Hunter Harrison Memorial Bridge, providing for the first time in school history a pedestrian crossing that connects the main campus and the campus areas south of the Norfolk-Southern railroad with uninterrupted access. This bridge connects to the new Southern Parking Garage, as well as the new $30 million Student Recreation & Fitness Center completed in 2021, expanding the area of the campus south of the railroad tracks. The university completed construction in November 2022 of the new $44 million Rudi E. Scheidt School of Music building on Central Ave., beginning a major northward expansion of campus across Central Ave.

=== Park Avenue Campus ===
The Park Avenue Campus, formerly known as South Campus, is located directly south of the main campus at the corner of Park Avenue and Getwell Road. The Park Avenue Campus was formerly the site of Kennedy Veterans Hospital from 1942 until 1967 when the U.S. Government donated the land and buildings to the university. Very few buildings from the Kennedy Hospital days remain on campus. The Park Avenue Campus is home not only to various intramural athletics programs and facilities but also to various research facilities, classrooms and the Community Health Building, which houses the School of Communication Sciences and Disorders, the Memphis Speech and Hearing Center, and the Loewenberg College of Nursing. The Defense Contract Audit Agency formerly operated its main training facility on the Park Avenue Campus from 1982 to the early 2010s. WKNO formerly operated its FM and television stations on the Park Avenue Campus as well.

Future plans include a regulation indoor soccer stadium and track facility, capable of hosting large-scale NCAA Division I track-and-field meets.

The graduate and family housing units are located at Park Avenue, 1 mile (1.6 km) from the main university campus. The complex has 150 housing units. Residents are zoned to Memphis City Schools. The zoned schools are Sherwood Elementary School, Colonial Middle School, and White Station High School.

=== Downtown Law School Campus ===
In 2006, plans were announced that the University of Memphis, School of Law would relocate to the former U.S. Post Office & Customs House in downtown Memphis. This facility pre-dates the existence of the university itself, having been constructed in multiple sections between 1885 and the early 1920s. In 2010, the law school was moved permanently from the main campus to the newly renovated downtown campus. The new University of Memphis School of Law campus sits adjacent to downtown courts and the financial and administrative center of the city. It has been ranked multiple times among the top law school facilities in the U.S.

=== Lambuth Campus ===
In 2011, the University of Memphis began offering undergraduate and graduate programs on the former Lambuth University campus in Jackson, Tennessee, located approximately 80 miles (130 km) east of Memphis. Now known as the University of Memphis Lambuth Campus, the historic campus includes classroom buildings, dormitories, a library, a planetarium, and athletic facilities. Starting in 2026, the Lambuth campus will house the doctor of physical therapy program. The inaugural class is set to graduate in 2029. Enrollment in the fall of 2011 stood at 246 students. Enrollment in the spring of 2018 was the first time enrollment surpassed 1,000 students, with a total of 1,038 students. The 2019–2020 term was the first term to begin with an enrollment of over 1,000 students for the campus, with an official enrollment of 1,070 students. In the fall of 2020, enrollment had risen to 1,285 students.

=== Environmentalism ===
The Edward J. Meeman Biological Station of the University of Memphis conducts research in ecology, environmental biology, and natural history. It is named for Edward J. Meeman, an editor of the former Memphis Press-Scimitar newspaper who later established a foundation to fund environmental studies.

In 2007, President Shirley Raines signed the American College and University President's Climate Commitment (ACUPCC), which requires that the university become carbon neutral.

The Green Campus Initiative works to develop and implement a strategic plan to achieve the goals of the APUPCC. Successful events and projects include the May 2009 2nd Annual E-Recycling Day, resulting in 155 tons of electronic items collected, and the Tiger Initiative for Gardening in Urban Settings (TIGUrS), a fruit and vegetable gardening initiative across campus.

In April 2008, the student-run Environmental Action Club ran a Green Power Campaign to promote a student referendum to add a "Green Fee" to tuition payments to fund clean, renewable energy and other campus sustainability projects. The referendum passed with a 69% student approval rate. The university is now purchasing renewable energy through the TVA's Green Power Switch program and offsetting 10% of current energy use. It is now the 2nd largest green power purchaser in the entire TVA distribution region.

In February 2009, the TERRA (Technologically and Environmentally Responsive Residential Architecture) sustainable design demonstration house was completed. Designed by the Department of Architecture, the LEED Platinum TERRA house serves as a studio for architecture and design students to design "green" housing within urban areas, as well as serve as a demonstration house open for tours and serve as an educational tool for the community.

Memphis received a grade of "C" on the 2009 Campus Sustainability Report Card published by the Sustainable Endowments Institute. Only 34 schools earned a higher grade.

== Organization ==
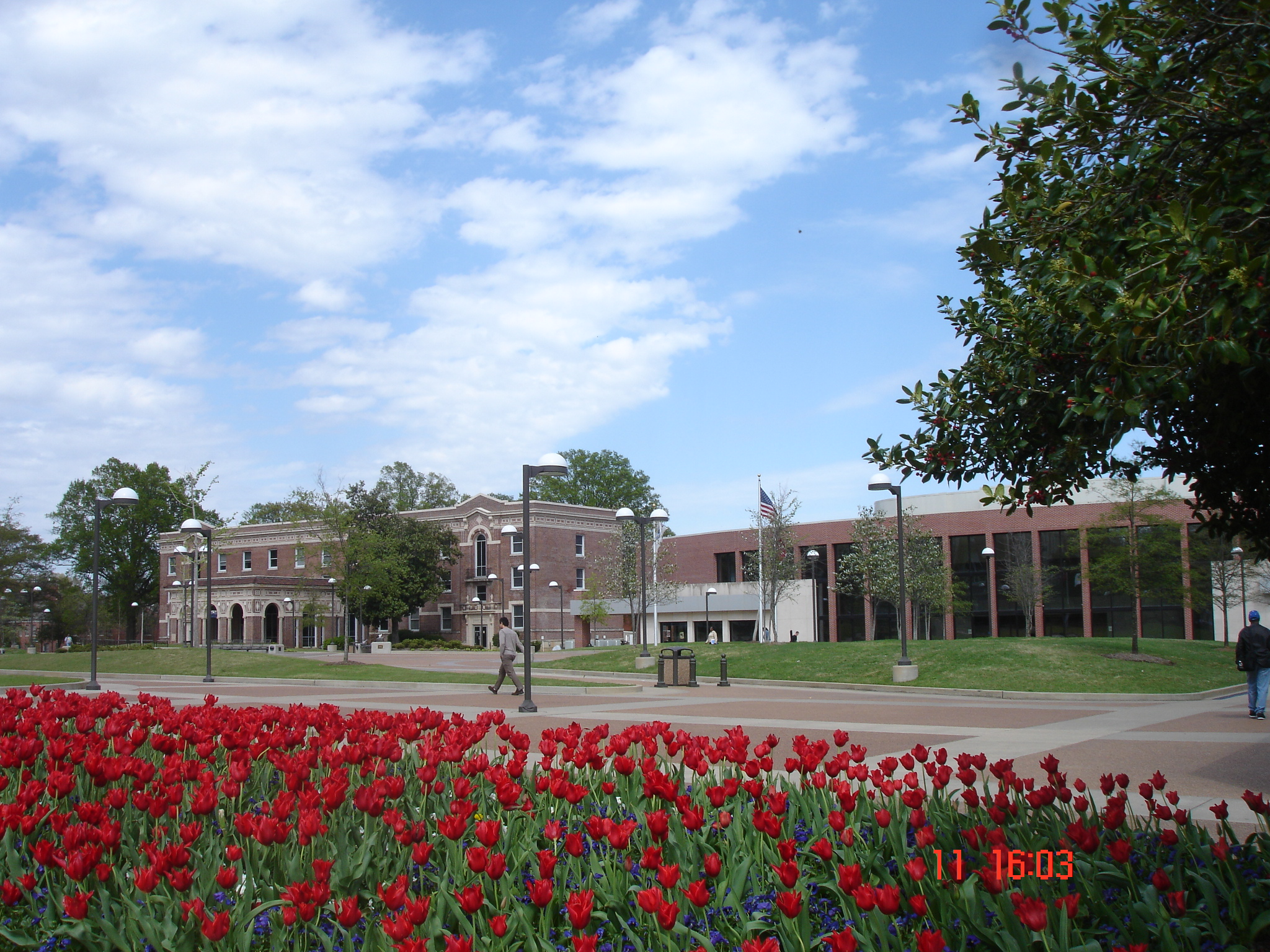
Student Activities Plaza

Academic rankings

National
- Forbes: 498
- U.S. News & World Report: 266 (tie)
- Washington Monthly: 149
- WSJ/College Pulse: 501–600

Global
- U.S. News & World Report: 1322 (tie)

The University of Memphis was previously associated with the Tennessee Board of Regents (TBR) system. In 2017, after the passing of the FOCUS Act legislation, the university left the Tennessee Board of Regents and established its own governing board, The University of Memphis Board of Trustees. Within this framework, the president of the University of Memphis is the day-to-day administrator of the university.

The University of Memphis today comprises a number of different colleges and schools:

- College of Arts and Sciences
- Fogelman College of Business and Economics
- College of Communication and Fine Arts
- College of Education
- Herff College of Engineering
- College of Professional and Liberal Studies
- Loewenberg College of Nursing
- Kemmons Wilson School of Hospitality and Resort Management
- School of Communication Sciences and Disorders
- Cecil C. Humphreys School of Law
- Graduate School
- School of Public Health
- Rudi E. Scheidt School of Music
- Helen Hardin Honors College

The University of Memphis is host to several centers of advanced research:

- FedEx Institute of Technology
- Center for Earthquake Research and Information
- Institute for Intelligent Systems
- Advanced Distributed Learning Workforce Co-Lab
- The Sparks Bureau of Business and Economic Research
- Mobile Sensor Data-To-Knowledge Center (NIH Center of Excellence)
- Center for Applied Earth Science and Engineering Research

The University of Memphis Foundation, founded in 1964, manages the university endowment and accepts, manages and disburses private support to the university.

== Student life ==
Undergraduate demographics as of Fall 2023
Race and ethnicity	Total
Black	41%
White	37%
Hispanic	11%
Asian	5%
Two or more races	4%
International student	2%
Unknown	1%
Economic diversity
Low-income (Note: The percentage of students who received an income-based federal Pell grant intended for low-income students.)	47%
Affluent (Note: The percentage of students who are a part of the American middle class at the bare minimum.)	53%

=== Athletics ===
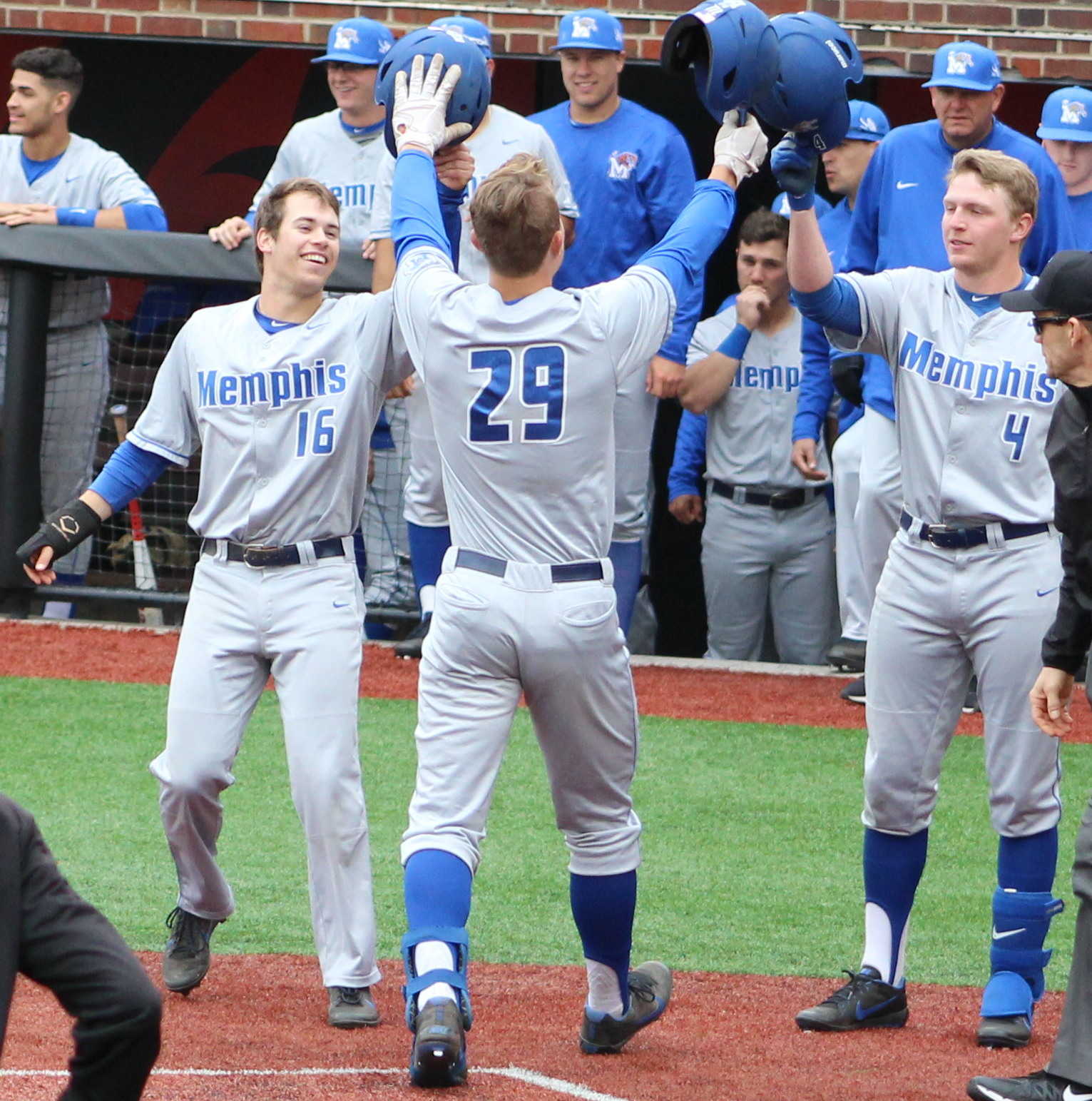
Memphis Tigers baseball players celebrate a home run in 2018

=== Student organizations ===
There are hundreds of student organizations on the University of Memphis campus.

=== Student newspaper ===
The Daily Helmsman is the student newspaper of the University of Memphis. The publication is part of a tradition that began in 1931 as The Tiger Rag, a protest newspaper. Since that time, the newspaper has been continuously published by University of Memphis students. Even during World War II when paper and other resources were scarce, the newspaper was published as a newsletter and posted on bulletin boards around campus.

The name of the newspaper was changed to The Helmsman in 1972 and became The Daily Helmsman in 1981 when the newspaper began publishing four days a week. In 2021, the paper moved to weekly publication. In 2025, The Helmsman ceased production of its print edition and moved exclusively online.

The Helmsman has won many honors over the years for reporting, photography and design, including awards given by the William Randolph Hearst Foundation, Columbia University and the Southeastern Journalism Conference. Helmsman alumni have gone on to jobs at many prestigious news organizations, such as The New York Times, Rolling Stone magazine, and Southern Living magazine, among others. In 2012, The Helmsman and then-Editor-in-Chief Chelsea Boozer were awarded the College Press Freedom Award for their efforts fighting "a retaliatory budget cut while enduring a campaign of harassment by campus police." The award is given annually by the Student Press Law Center and the Associated Collegiate Press. Boozer also won a national Investigative Reporters and Editors award for coverage of how student activity fees are spent, including how the Student Government Association writes its senior officers' free tuition, parking and stipends out of the money collected from the student body.

=== Religious organizations ===
Numerous religious centers are located on the campus, including the Wesley Foundation (a United Methodist student center), the Baptist Collegiate Ministry, the university Catholic Center and Catholic Student Center, Ukirk (a PCUSA campus ministry) Barth House Episcopal Student Center, Reformed University Fellowship, the Soma Christian Student Center (a Church of Christ-supported center), Memphis Hillel, and the Muslim Students Association. Numerous other religious clubs of various faiths also exist on campus, and they meet in various locations.

=== Honor societies ===
There are 11 honor societies on campus.

=== Greek life ===
About six percent of undergraduate men and eight percent of undergraduate women are active in Memphis' Greek system. There are over 20 social Greek letter organizations on campus. However, since the late nineties, Greek campus participation has been decimated due to social issues.

== Traditions ==
The University of Memphis has accumulated numerous traditions over its long history within the Tennessee Board of Regents system.

=== Mighty Sound of the South ===
The Mighty Sound of the South Band is the university's band. The band performs at Memphis Tigers football games as a marching band and at Tigers basketball games as a pep band. As one of the oldest institutions at the university, the Band partakes in many of the game day traditions. The MSS performs more than any other student ensemble on campus and for approximately 350,000 fans each fall. The MSS is featured at nearly every campus-wide event, ranging from Freshman Convocation to the Homecoming Parade and Pep Rally. The band has been featured on the nationally syndicated "Mike & Mandy" Radio Show and is a star attraction at the Bandmaster's Championship, a high school marching band contest administered by The University of Memphis Band Alumni Chapter. Members of the MSS represent all academic disciplines across campus and historically have been open to all students via audition.

=== Mascot ===
For over 30 years, since 1972, the sideline mascot for The University of Memphis has been a live Bengal tiger named TOM. During this time, the university has hosted three successive tigers, known respectively as TOM I, TOM II, and TOM III. The university also has a costumed tiger mascot known as Pouncer.

Throughout the majority of the TOM era, the tiger attended all Tiger football home games and other University events. TOM traveled in a climate-controlled trailer with a police escort and was housed and cared for by the Highland Hundred Tiger Guard, an alumni booster organization in a $300,000 facility.

TOM II matured, eventually weighing more than 500 pounds (230 kg). The University of Memphis was one of only two universities in America with a live tiger mascot (the other being LSU in Baton Rouge). After being diagnosed with mouth cancer, TOM II was euthanized on October 15, 2008, at the age of 17. The team of veterinarians who oversaw TOM II decided this was necessary to ensure he did not suffer due to his illness.

TOM III, the most recent tiger, died on September 18, 2020. Following TOM's passing it was announced that there would be a TOM IV, but it would be housed and remain at the Memphis Zoo.

The university currently has fifty tiger statues located on campus and another fifty located around the Memphis area. The Alumni Association placed the life-sized tigers around the city in honor of the university's centennial in January 2012.

=== Nickname ===
When the University of Memphis first fielded a football team in the fall of 1912, no one had selected a nickname for the squad. Early references to the football team tabbed them only as the Blue and Gray Warriors.

After the final game of the 1914 season, there was a student parade. During this event, several university students shouted, "We fight like Tigers!" The nickname was born. As time passed, the nickname "Tigers" was increasingly used, particularly in campus publications, but did not catch on with the newspapers downtown. They continued to use "the Blue and Gray" when referring to the university. Blue and Gray represented the unity of the United States and in 1976, the Tigers wore red, white and blue in celebration of the United States Bicentennial.

Under Coach Lester Barnard in 1922, Memphis's football team gave a ring of truth to that old student yell about Tigers. The team adopted a motto—"Every Man a Tiger"—and went on to score 174 points while allowing its opponents just 29 points. The Tiger nickname continued with students and alumni, eventually being adopted as the official nickname for the University of Memphis in 1939.

=== Song ===
Notable among a number of songs commonly played and sung at various events such as commencement and convocation, and athletic games is "Go! Tigers! Go!," the University of Memphis Tigers' fight song. The fight song was written by Tom Ferguson, former Director of Bands at Memphis State University, during the 1960s.

=== Art Museum of the University of Memphis ===
The Art Museum of the University of Memphis (AMUM), located in the Communication and Fine Arts Building on the main campus, opened in 1981 as the University Gallery and received its current name in 1994, when Memphis State University became the University of Memphis. Its permanent collections include Egyptian antiquities, traditional African art, and contemporary prints and drawings, shown alongside temporary exhibitions of contemporary art. Admission is free.

=== Tennessee Governor's School for International Studies ===
The Governor's School for International Studies is an academic summer program for gifted junior and senior high school students in Tennessee. It is a selective program located at the University of Memphis in which students study two political sciences, a foreign language, and an elective of their choice from the international studies curriculum. The students, upon finishing the four-week term, gain six hours of college credit, which may be transferred to any Tennessee Board of Regents School.

=== Chucalissa Indian Village ===
UofM also operates the Chucalissa Indian Village, an American Indian heritage site and museum. Officially known as the T. O. Fuller State Park, the location includes a museum and important archeological sites.

=== The Benjamin L. Hooks Institute for Social Change ===
Founded in 1996 by civil rights activist Benjamin L. Hooks and faculty of the department of political science at the University of Memphis, the Benjamin L. Hooks Institute for Social Change at the University of Memphis is dedicated to preserving the history of the civil rights movement and continuing the struggle for equality championed by its namesake. The Hooks Institute is housed within the College of Arts and Sciences at the University of Memphis. The mission of the Hooks Institute is to teach, study and promote civil rights and positive social change. This mission is implemented through a variety of programs focused on the scholarship of the civil rights movement, public policy research and scholarship, commemorations and grants focused on continuing scholarship of the civil rights movement, public events focused on civil rights and social change, media focused on the civil rights movement including documentary films and websites, and direct engagement programs to improve the conditions of marginalized communities.

== Notable people ==
=== List of presidents ===
- Seymour A. Mynders (1912–1913)
- John Willard Brister (1913–1918)
- Andrew A. Kincannon (1918–1924)
- John Willard Brister (1924–1939)
- Richard C. Jones (1939–1943)
- Jennings B. Sanders (1943–1946)
- J. Millard (Jack) Smith (1946–1960)
- Cecil C. Humphreys (1960–1972)
- John Richardson (1972–1973) interim
- Billy Mac Jones (1973–1980)
- Thomas G. Carpenter (1980–1991)
- V. Lane Rawlins (1991–2000)
- Ralph Faudree (2000–2001) interim
- Shirley C. Raines (2001–2013)
- R. Brad Martin (2013–2014) interim
- M. David Rudd (2014–2022)
- Bill Hardgrave (2022–Present)

=== Notable alumni ===
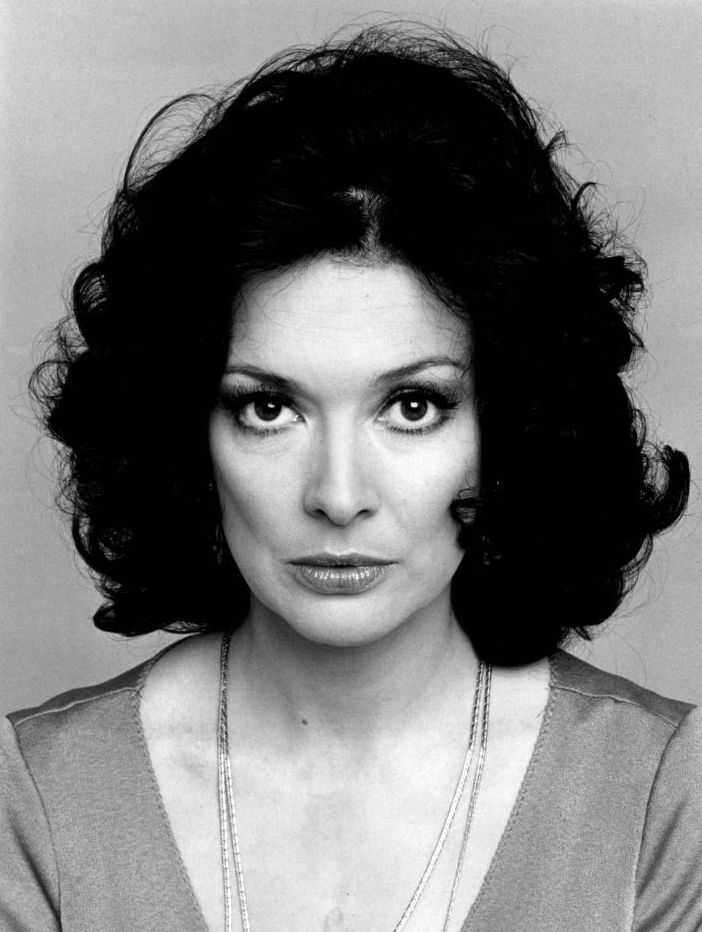
Dixie Carter
Actress

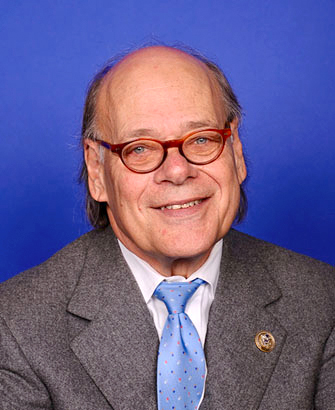
Steve Cohen
U.S. Representative, 9th Congressional District, Tennessee

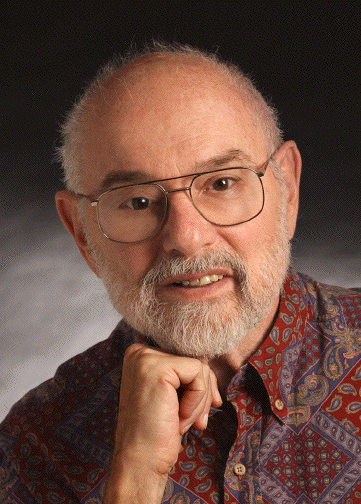
Stan Franklin
Cognitive scientist

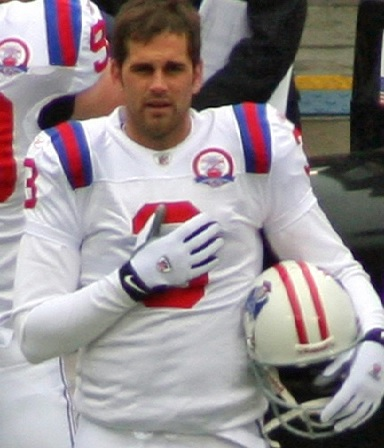
Stephen Gostkowski
American football player

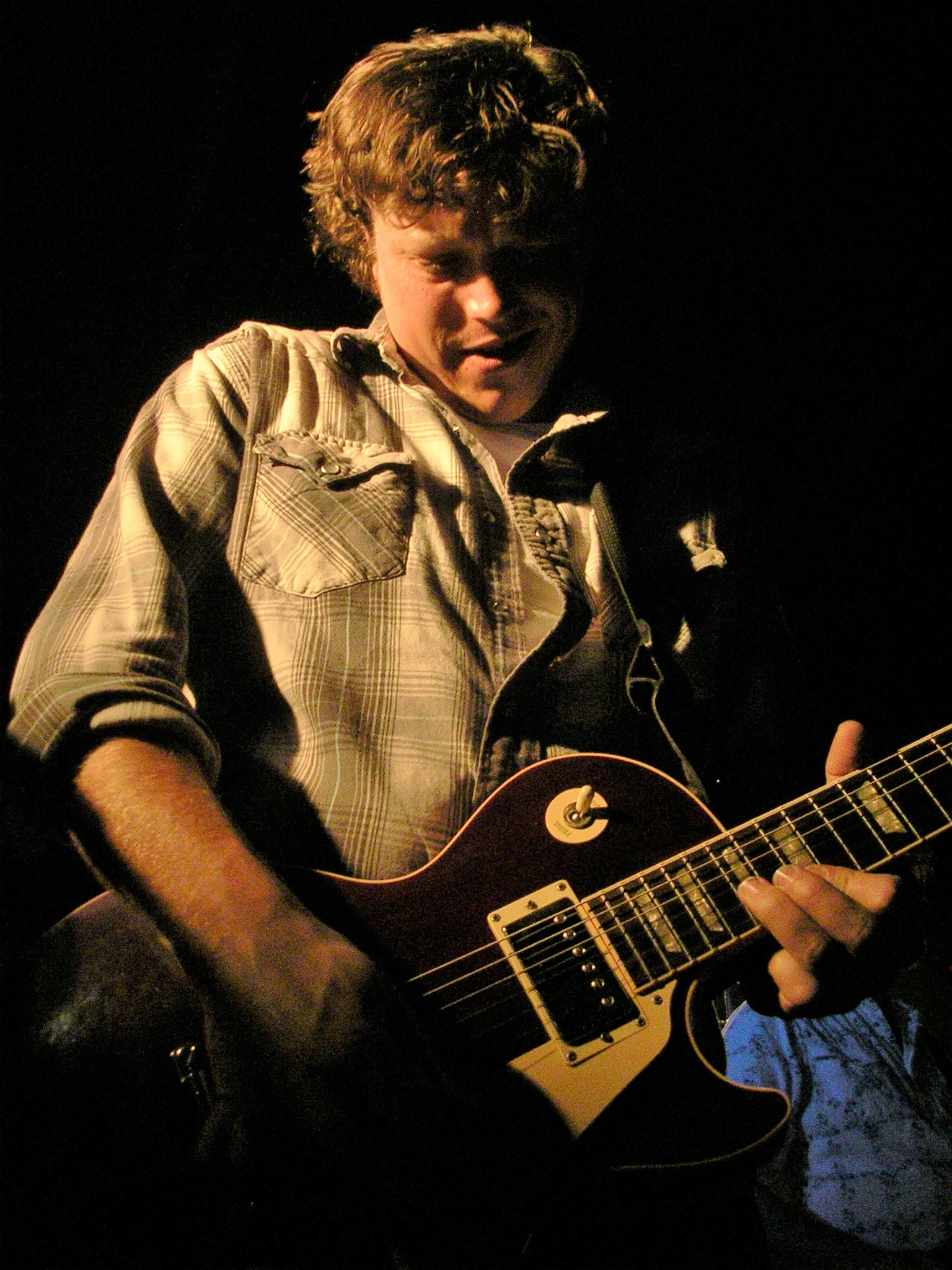
Jason Isbell
Singer-songwriter

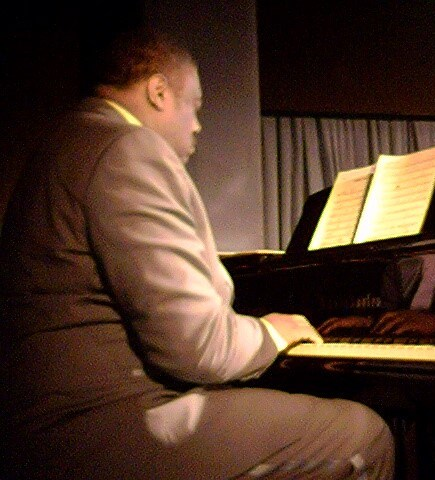
Mulgrew Miller
Jazz pianist

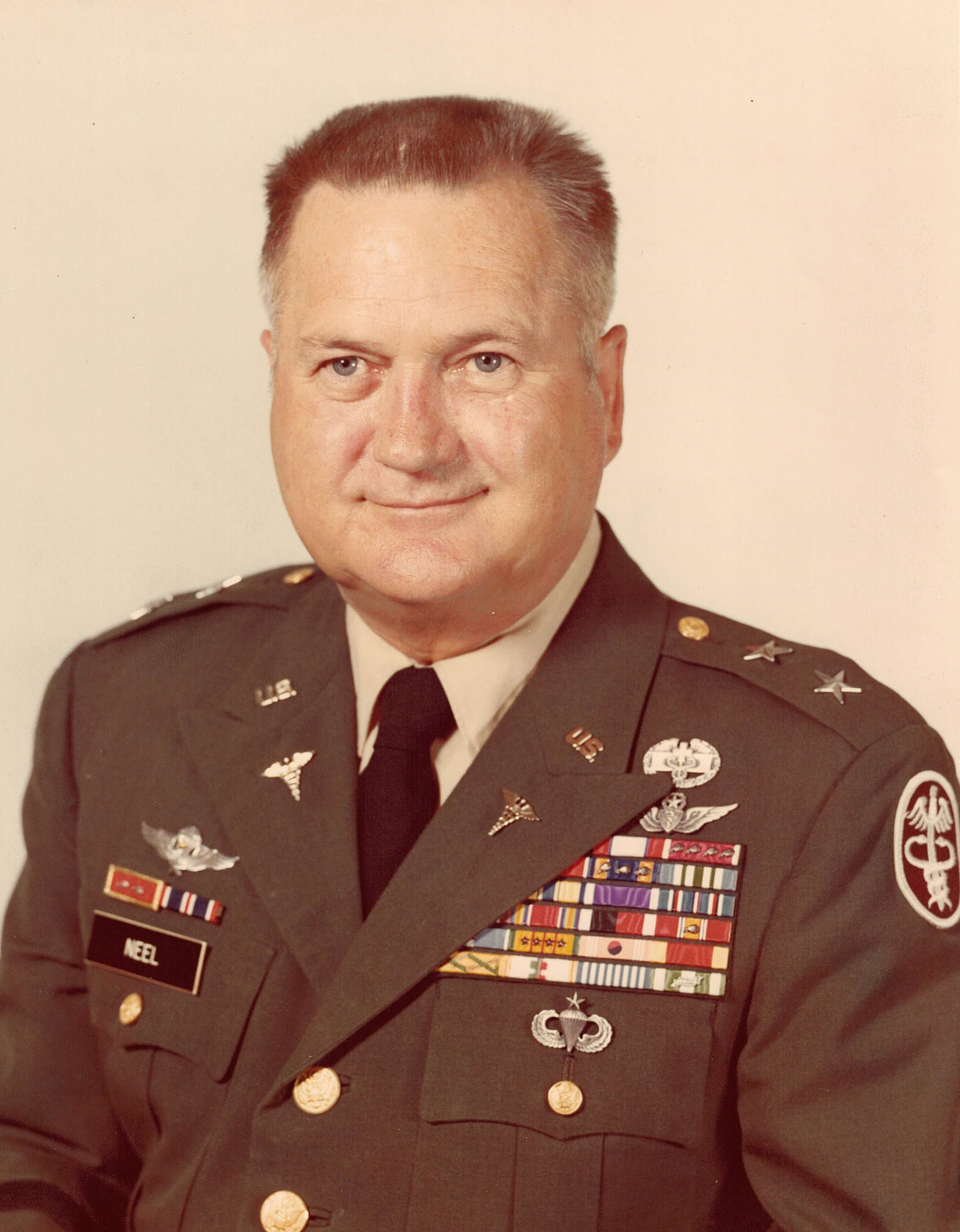
Spurgeon Neel, MD
Major General, U.S. Army, aeromedical evacuation pioneer

Edmund Warren Perry
Writer

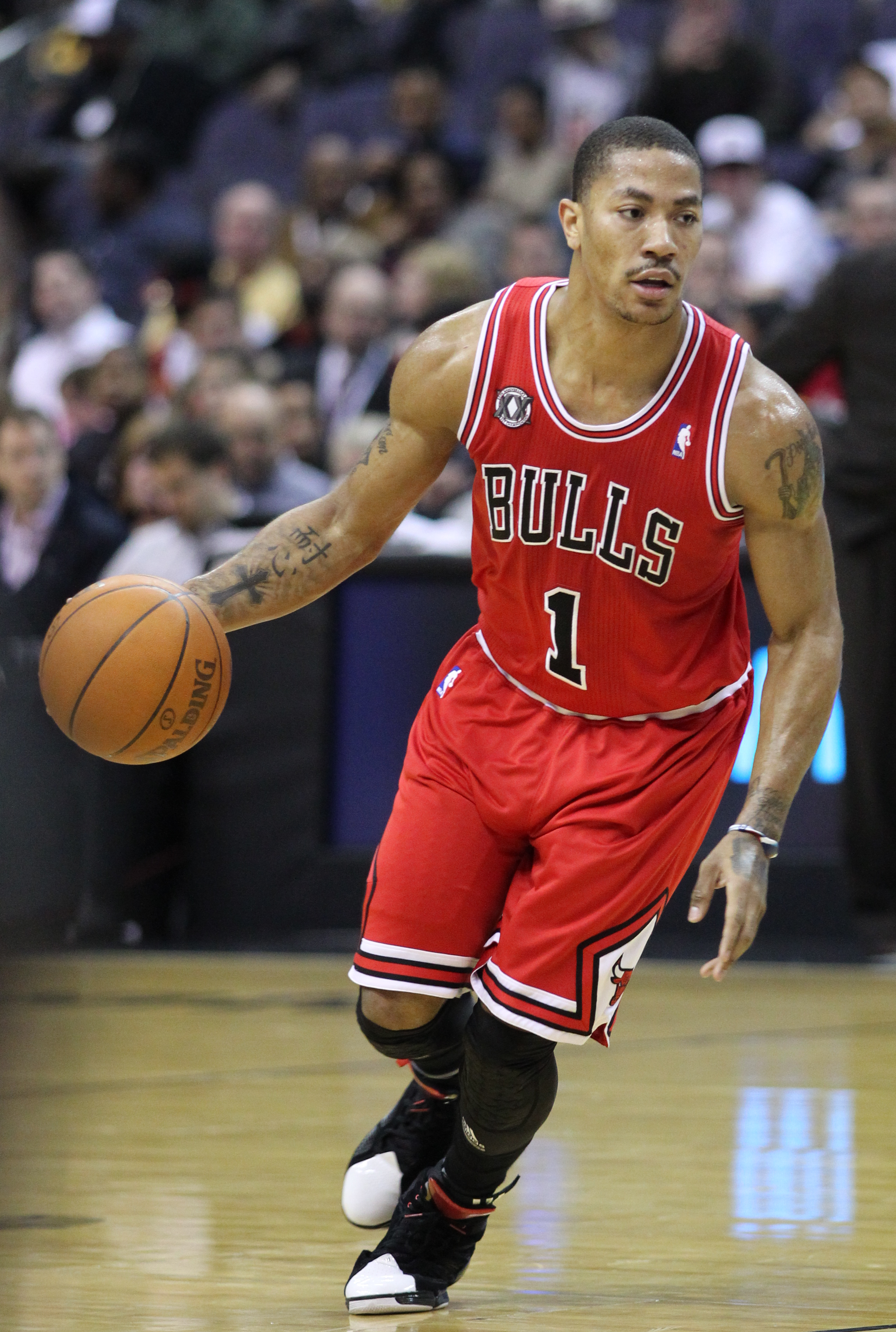
Derrick Rose
Professional basketball player

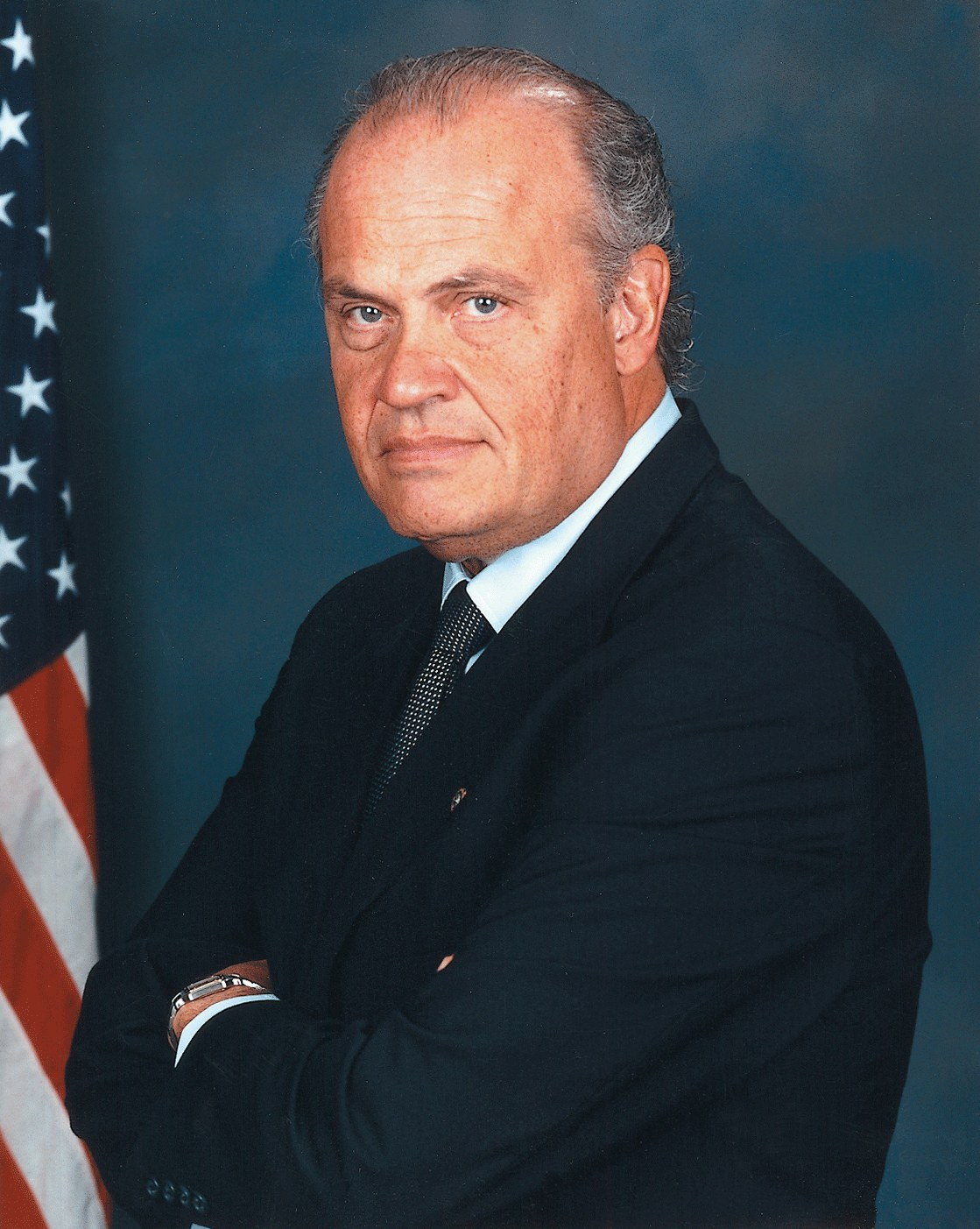
Fred Thompson
U.S. Senator

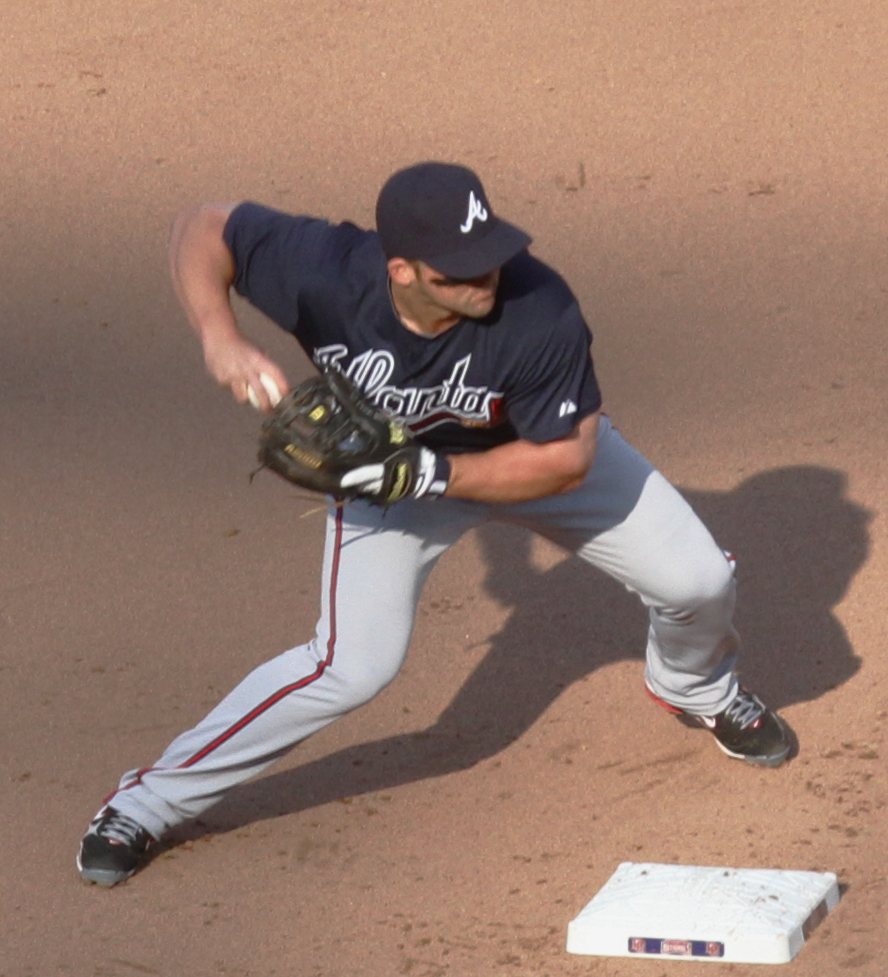
Dan Uggla
Professional baseball player

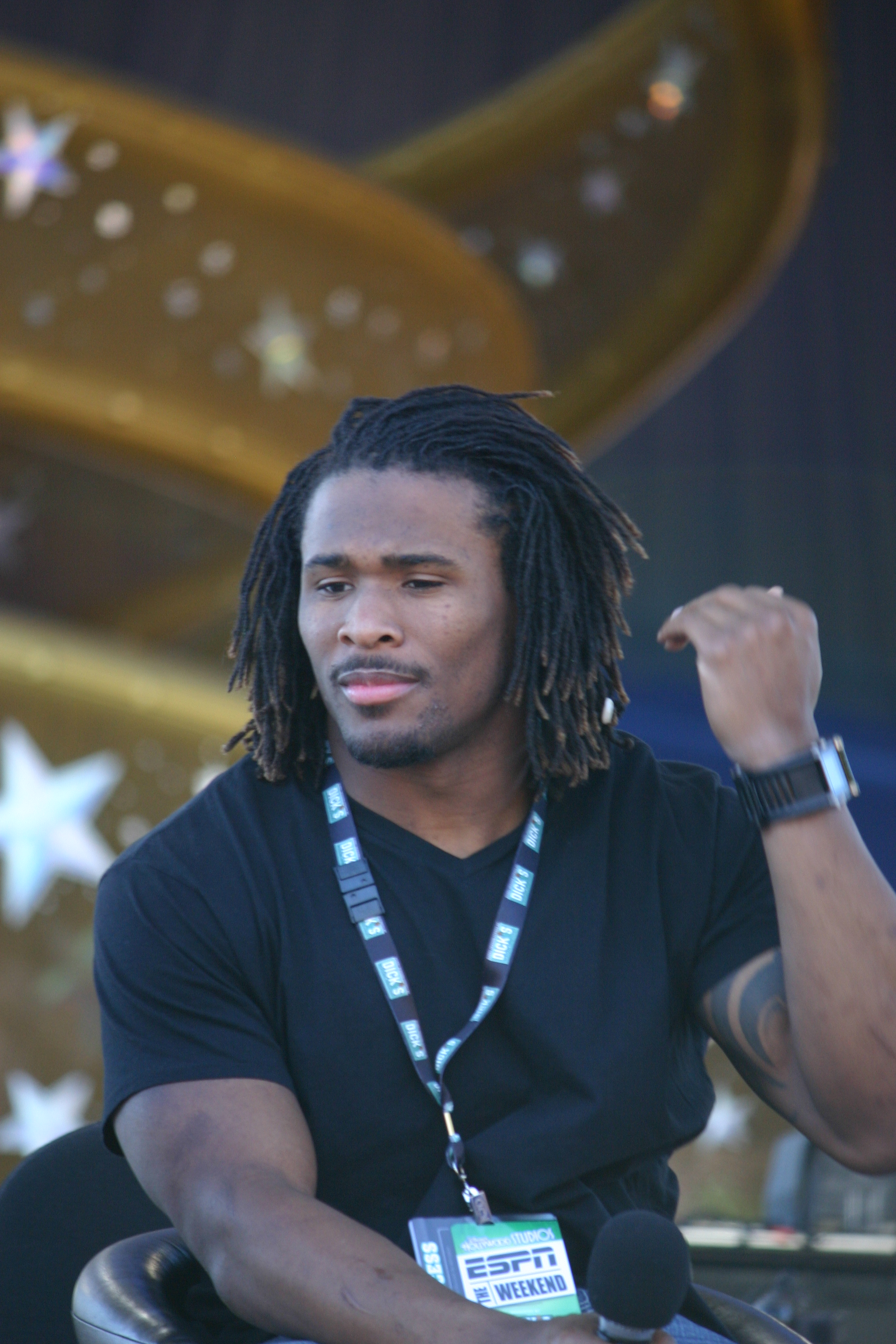
DeAngelo Williams
American football player
