= Shirley Raines =

American public speaker and author

- Born: April 15, 1945 (age 81); Jackson, Tennessee, U.S.

Academic background
- Education: University of Tennessee at Martin; University of Tennessee (MSc, D.Ed.)

Shirley C. Raines is an American public speaker, author and leadership consultant who retired from academia after serving as president of the University of Memphis from 2001 to 2013. Before entering administration she was a professor of education, specializing in early childhood.

== Early life ==
Raines was born April 15, 1945, in Jackson, Tennessee, and grew up on a cotton farm near Bells. She completed her undergraduate education at UT Martin, studying child development, and then worked as a kindergarten teacher for several years. She later undertook further studies at UT Knoxville, graduating with an M.Sc. in child development and later a D.Ed. in elementary and early education.

== Academia ==
Before entering administration, Raines taught for periods at the University of Alabama; North Carolina Wesleyan College; Northeastern State University, Oklahoma; George Mason University, Virginia; and the University of South Florida. In 1995, she was appointed dean of education at the University of Kentucky; she was additionally made vice-president for academic affairs three years later. She served as president of the Association for Childhood Education International from 1999 to 2001. In January 2001, the board of regents of the University of Memphis elected Raines as the successor to President V. Lane Rawlins – the first woman to hold the position. Her term began on July 1, 2001, and continued until her retirement on June 30, 2013. As president, Raines oversaw the acquisition of Lambuth University, the establishment of the University of Memphis Research Foundation and the Memphis Research Consortium, and the construction of a number of new buildings. She was inducted into the Tennessee Women's Hall of Fame in 2013, and retired to Oak Ridge, Tennessee, where she works as a motivational speaker and leadership consultant.

== See also ==
- List of women presidents or chancellors of co-ed colleges and universities
