= Lakeshore Mall (Wisconsin) =

Shopping Center in Manitowoc, Wisconsin

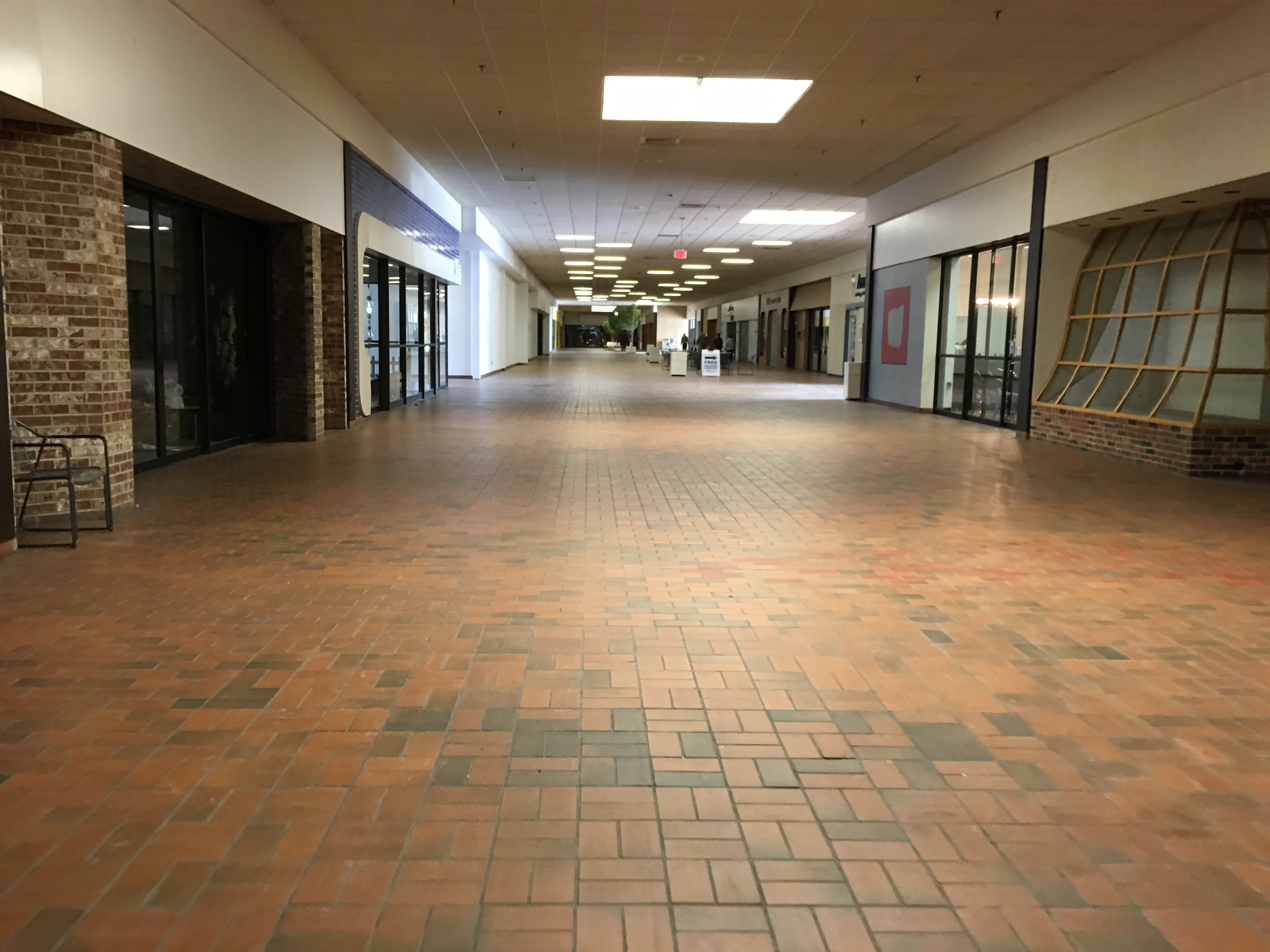
- A Lakeshore Mall hallway in 2016
- Location: Manitowoc, Wisconsin, United States
- Coordinates: 44°07′04″N 87°38′18″W
- Opened: May 27, 1979; 47 years ago
- Renovated: 2000
- Closed: 2018
- Demolished: 2025
- Previous names: Edgewater Plaza
- Developer: Daniel Wergin Jr.
- Num. of anchor tenants: 3
- Floor area: 200,000 square feet (19,000 m^{2})
- Floors: 1
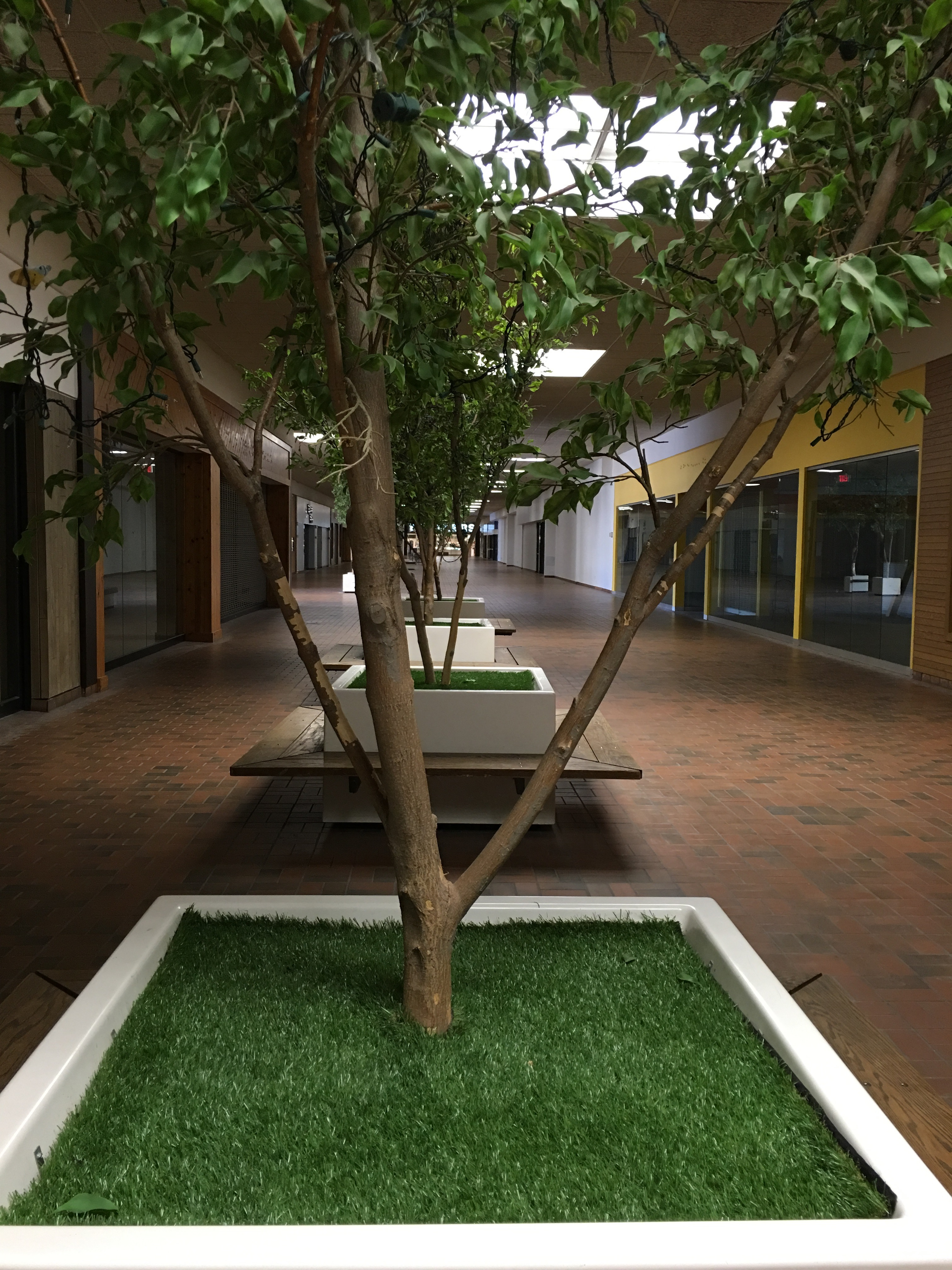
- Interior of the nearly vacant Lakeshore Mall in Manitowoc, Wisconsin, in 2016.

Edgewater Plaza logo from 1979

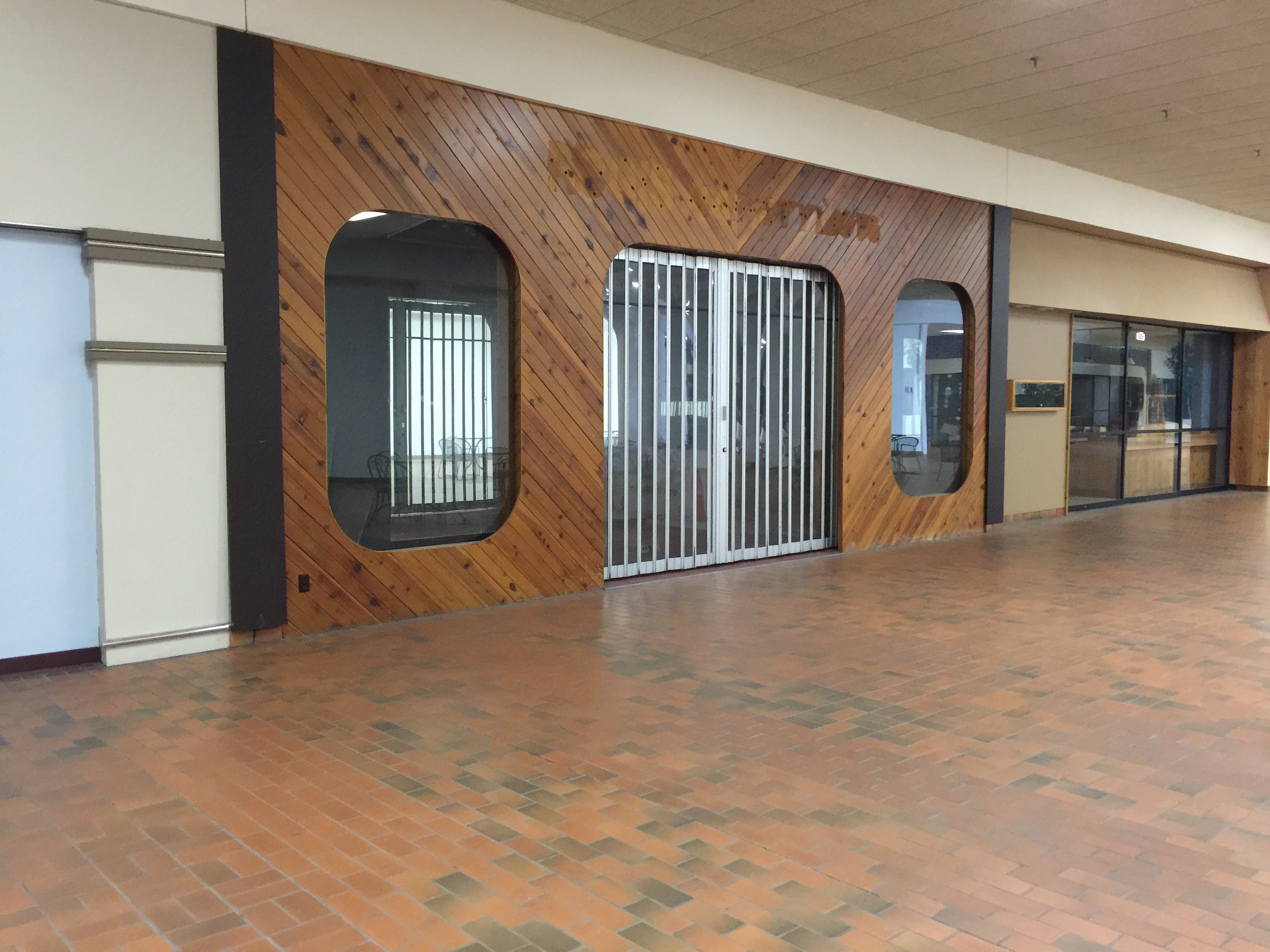
Vacant Regis Hairstylist storefront inside Lakeshore Mall in 2015.

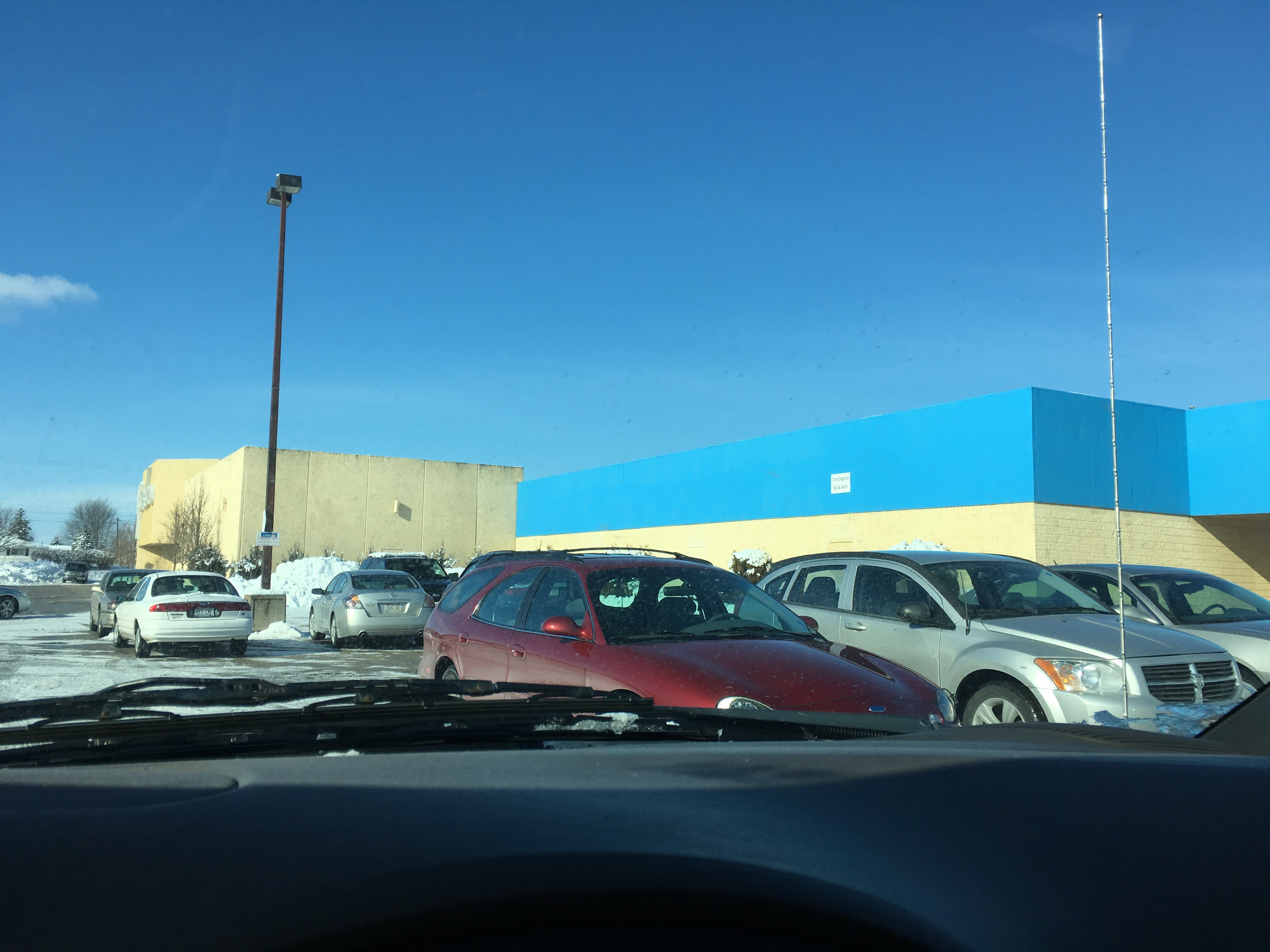
Parking lot of Lakeshore Mall in Manitowoc, Wisconsin, in 2016.

Lakeshore Mall was a 200,000 square feet (19,000 m^{2}) shopping Mall located in Manitowoc, Wisconsin. The mall had 3 anchors which were Younkers, Prange Way, and Sears. Lakeshore Mall opened as the Edgewater Plaza in 1979. The shopping mall closed in 2018, and is currently being demolished.

== History ==
Construction on the Edgewater Plaza started in May, 1978. The mall was developed by Daniel Wergin Jr., and the mall was located adjacent to the Mid-Cities Mall.The Sears in the Edgewater Plaza would open on March 1, 1979 as a surplus catalog store. On March 10, more stores signed leases to the shopping center.

Edgewater Plaza would officially open on May 27, 1979 with a total of 3 anchors which included a Sears Catalog Store, Prange's, and Prange Way. By October, 1979 stores included Prange's, B. Dalton Booksellers, Musicland, Sears, Thom McAn Shoes, Big Dipper, Del Monicos, Regis Hairstylists, Prange Way, Zales Jewelers, Thought Of You, G.T.E. Phone Mart, Corn Dog, Shoreline Design, Stevensons, and Brooks Fashions.

In 1982 Edgewater Plaza was sold to Source Capital, a Milwaukee, Wisconsin based investment company. By 1985 the mall would add 4 more stores to their roster. These stores included The Snackery Restaurant, Instrumental Music, Inc., The Player's Choice, and Deb Shops.

By 1990 the mall was doing well adding another 2 stores to the mall: the ID and Diane's Hallmark. Prange's became Younkers in 1992, Smoking inside the mall was banned by 1994,and Prange Way would close by March, 1996.

In 1997 the mall was put up for sale, and was bought by Reliastar Life Insurance Company. In 2000 the mall was sold yet again for $1 million to MLG Commercial.

By the 2000s the mall was starting to show its age. In 2003 the mall was sold to a developer who had plans to increase foot traffic inside the shopping center. He had the Sears reopen by May, 2003 as it had closed in 1993. These plans wouldn't really help the mall though, and the mall would continue to die.

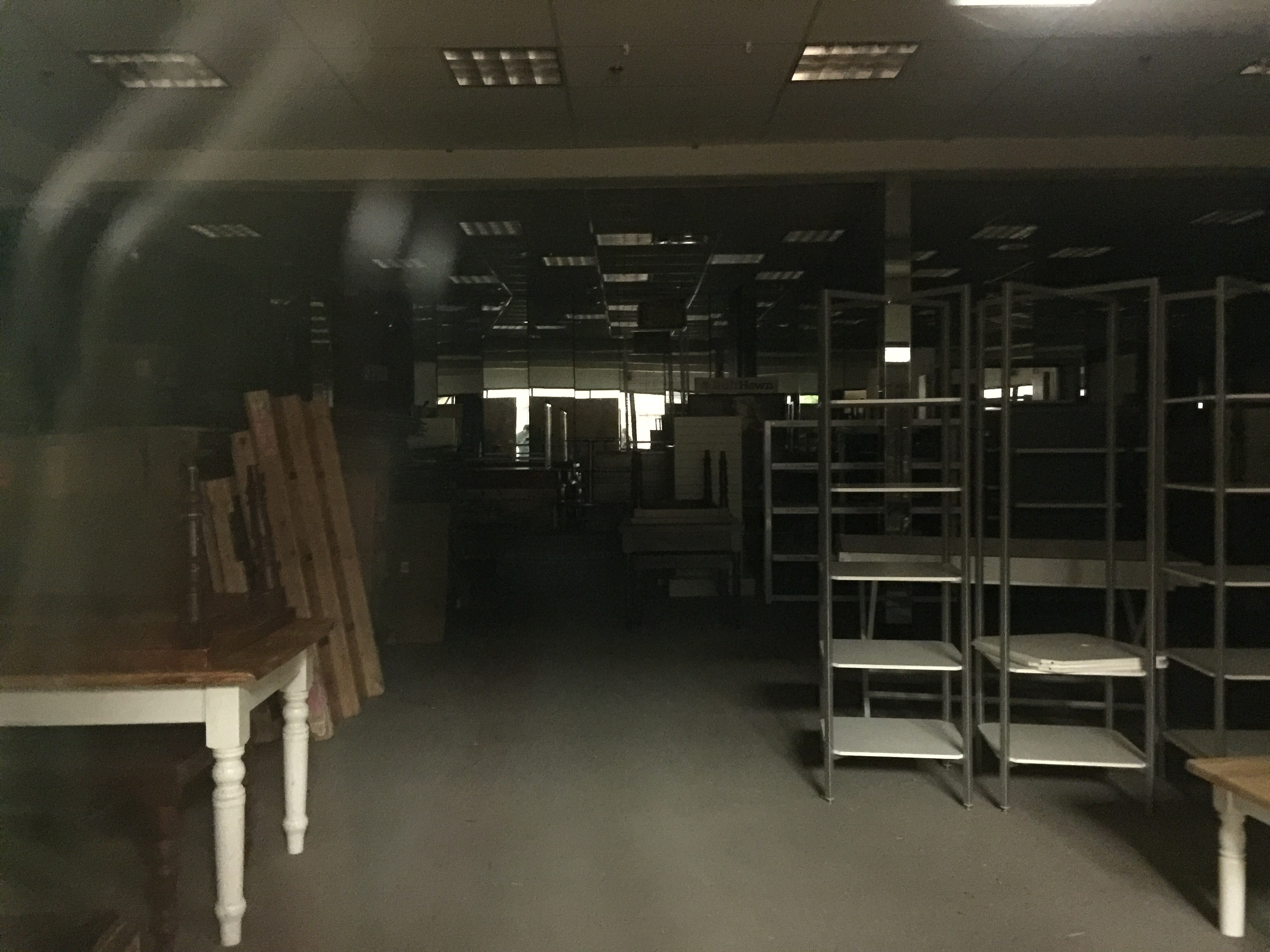
Interior of a vacant storefront at Lakeshore Mall in Manitowoc, Wisconsin, in 2015.

By the late 2000s the mall's name was changed to the Lakeshore Mall. by 2016 the mall was hanging on by a thread. In 2018 Younkers would close their store as a part of Bon-Ton going out of business.

The now former Lakeshore Mall was announced for demolition in 2025 and will be finished by late 2026, and then be redeveloped.
