= Younker =

Younker may refer to:

== Surname ==
- John L. Younker (1836–1911), American Civil War soldier
- Marcus Younker (1839–1926), American businessman and retail executive

== Other ==
- Younkers, American department store
- Younker Brothers Department Store, historic building in Des Moines, Iowa
