= Memorial Mall =

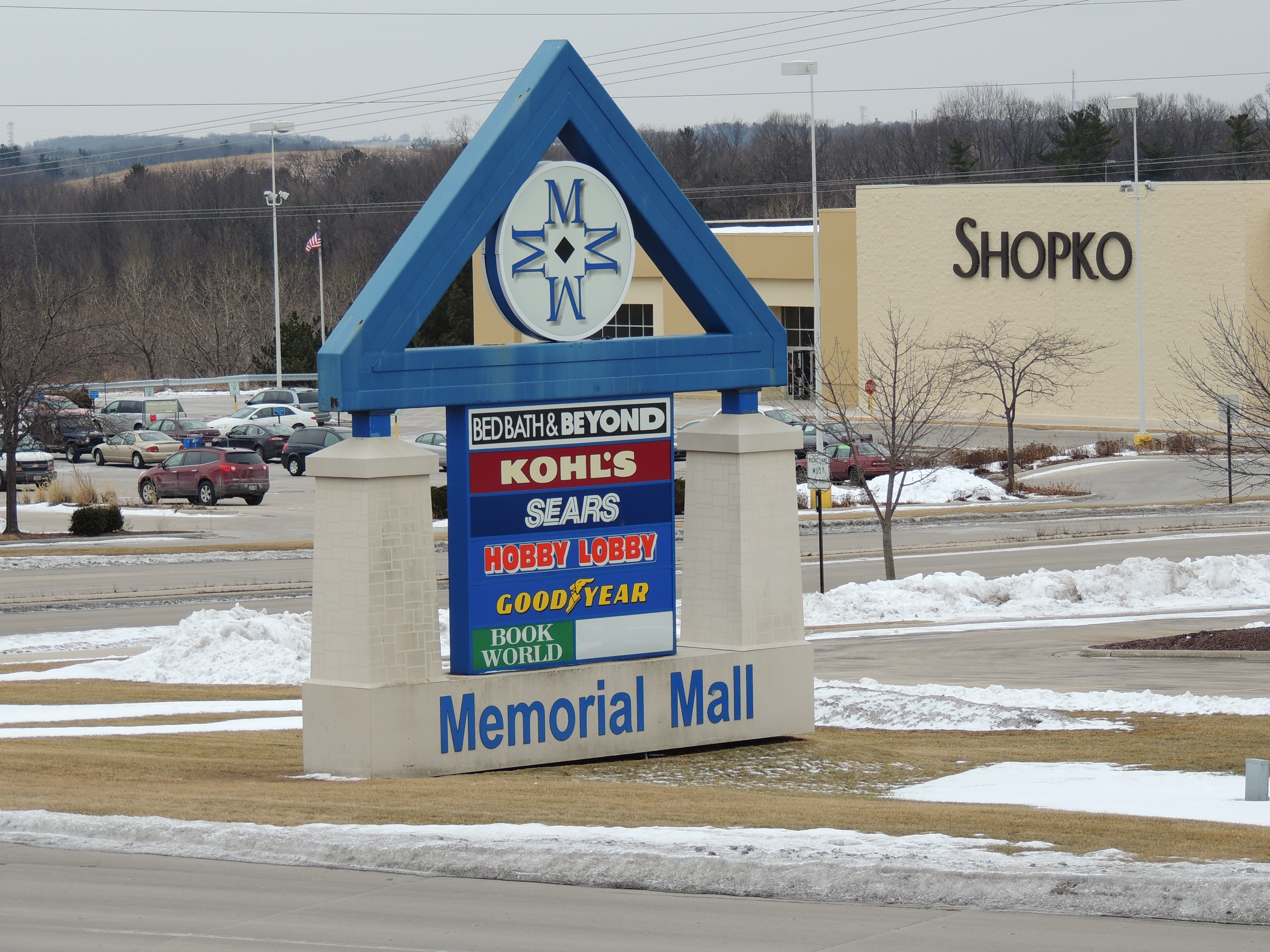
- Location: Sheboygan, Wisconsin; United States
- Coordinates: 43.754249°N 87.753673°W
- Address: 3347 Kohler Memorial Drive
- Opened: 1969; April 25, 2019 (Meijer opening on former north mall footprint)
- Closed: July 30, 2017 (as traditional indoor mall)
- Demolished: October 11 – December 2017
- Developer: Melvin Simon & Associates
- Owner: Meijer Real Estate
- Num. of stores: 9
- Num. of anchor tenants: 3 (1 vacant)
- Floors: 1
- Parking: surrounding surface lot
- Public transit: Shoreline Metro
- Website: www.memorialmall.com

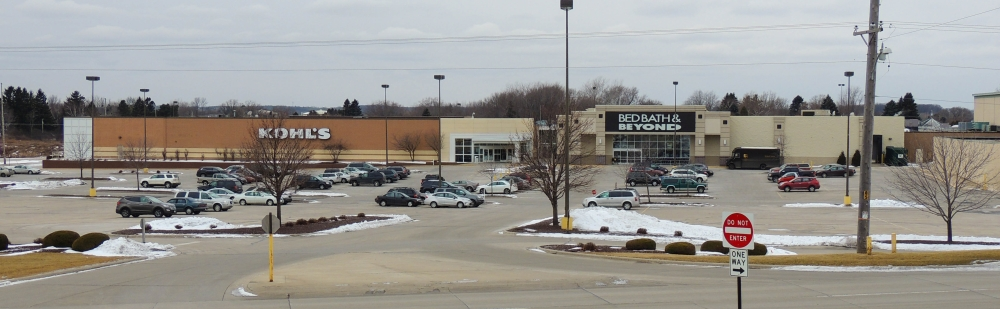

Memorial Mall was a shopping mall located in Sheboygan, Wisconsin, since redeveloped and anchored by a new Meijer hypermarket. Opened in 1969, it currently features Kohl's and four other smaller stores in the former south mall wing, with three additional stores within the Meijer space.

== History ==
=== Early history ===
Originally a development of Melvin Simon & Associates (now Simon Property Group), the groundwork for Sheboygan County's first and only enclosed mall was laid in August 1968 with the construction of its first store, large 160,000-square-foot (15,000 m^{2}), two-story J.C. Penney with an auto center as an out-parcel; when J.C. Penney ceased operation auto centers, Firestone assumed operation of the facility. Goodyear Auto Center has also been part of the mall since opening, though it moved to the west end of the building in the mid-2000s. Other anchors included a G. C. Murphy variety store, and a Red Owl Supermarket.

Both Sears and J.C. Penney moved from their existing stores downtown, though H.C. Prange, the locally-based department store, declined to leave its downtown location, or even build a branch store at Memorial Mall. Prange's later became part of other chains, ultimately the Boston Store, but remained at the same location until it closed in January 2014.

Although Memorial Mall would hold its official grand opening in April 1970 with over 35 shops, eateries and services, the third and final anchor abutting the north end, an 80,000-square-foot (7,400 m^{2}) Sears with attached Auto Center would not open until November 1970, completing the 350,000 square feet (33,000 m^{2}) complex. Until the opening of Fond Du Lac's Forest Mall in 1973, it was the largest enclosed shopping center in east-central Wisconsin. After Murphy's closed, Kohl's purchased the space in 1983 and renovated the building in the mid-2000s to meet the company's current store concepts.

Although the mall maintained its official address on Kohler Memorial Drive (WI 23), by the end of the 70's it had lost direct access to that road when it was converted to a freeway in order to interchange with Interstate 43 to the west. This would influence the mall's decline later, as the convenient access from the busy Kohler Memorial Drive was removed, forcing traffic onto surrounding surface roads. This included Taylor Drive, which upon its 1985 extension south, along with the relocation of WI 28 from Indiana Avenue (which being next to the Sheboygan River, had little development opportunity around wetlands) to Washington Avenue (with plenty of vacant land), became the new major retail corridor in the city and allowed retail competition to the south where previously only marshland, forest and farm fields had existed.

=== Reconfiguration and later struggles ===
In 2001, J.C. Penney left the mall, with Hobby Lobby taking the first floor space and removing the building's existing escalator. In 2003, Simon Property Group sold Memorial Mall and the new owners renovated the mall building. Walgreens departed its longtime location in the mall in 2001 upon the opening of its new central-city store at the intersection of WI 23/28/42. The former Goodyear space, after its move to the Red Owl space (which was used by Hobbytown USA for several years) was given over to Bed Bath & Beyond for a store which outside of sharing a mall entrance, has no direct access from the mall. Outside of a several-month period where the off-price discount retailer Famous Brands filled the space, the Walgreens space was never filled again outside of use by organizations for charity events. Many of the mall's existing smaller tenants departed the mall when Kohler's Deer Trace power center opened in 2005. The mall's center court was eventually converted to a children's play area in order to give some use to what was formerly a large public space with food options.

In 2012, Memorial Mall was sold at a foreclosure auction. Bank of America, the lender to the mall, bought the property at a sheriff's auction for about $2.1 million. Prior to the auction, the mall was owned by a group of 17 New York-based limited liability companies and had been in foreclosure since 2009, after falling rental rates and a lack of new tenants left owners owing far more on the property than its value.

In February 2014, RadioShack closed its store after nearly thirty years of being located inside the mall. Sears Holdings announced the closure of its Memorial Mall store and confirmed the closure of Sears Auto earlier that year; Sears would franchise a Sears Appliance and Hardware Store to take its place which existed until the summer of 2019, located on the city's south side in the Washington Square shopping center (the mall store had removed already removed clothing and white goods by 2012 to focus on appliances, electronics and hardware). Thirty employees lost their positions, with the store closed in early February 2015. In January 2015, the mall’s general manager confirmed that three stores announced their intention to leave the mall; Amy’s Hallmark, Revolution (an extreme sports shop which consolidated into their location in downtown Sheboygan), and Deb Shops (which was already being liquidated nationwide).

=== Meijer moves in; future redevelopment ===
On March 17, 2015, Siegel Gallagher, Inc. represented NRFC Memorial Holdings, LLC on the sale of Memorial Mall to Michigan-based hypermarket retailer Meijer for $10.75 million. The sale included the acquisition of the adjoining Sears store. Meijer has been busy with expansions of its store locations in Wisconsin, with a number of stores opening in southeast Wisconsin since 2015. The company planned to run out the clock on the mall's existing lessees into 2017, opening their new store and adjoining convenience store in 2019 after razing and reconstruction, with Kohl's and Bed, Bath and Beyond retaining their existing buildings and the indoor entrances into the mall either sealed up or converted to exterior entrances. Powers Goodyear remained unchanged on the building's west side. The four existing stores remaining in the Kohl's forecourt were in the new Meijer development, while Firestone has already relocated into a new building on the city's south side near the Washington Square shopping center.

By its last days, the mall's occupancy rate stood at 13% (6 of 48 store spaces), with the northern "Sears" wing's seventeen spaces fully vacant. With the closing of the Mexican restaurant Diamond Dave's Taco Company in May 2016, the mall no longer had any food options. Hobby Lobby wound-down operations after Christmas 2016 and vacated on January 14, 2017 (returning across the street in a redevelopment of the former ShopKo store with Ross Dress for Less in 2023), while the Book World bookstore formerly located next to Sears followed shortly thereafter with a move to the nearby Taylor Heights (its parent company went bankrupt only eleven months later). Bath & Body Works closed in April 2017, along with the arcade game room. GNC closed just before the end of July 2017.

At the close of business on July 30, 2017, Memorial Mall effectively ceased to exist as a traditional mall, as the next day preliminary demolition preparation and asbestos abatement began. The center court and north wings were demolished on October 11, the former Penney's building was leveled shortly thereafter and most demolition finished by mid-December. The Kohl's forecourt remained open during construction, along with all existing stores as Meijer's construction proceeded on the former site of the mall's north end and anchor spaces. The new configuration called for a wall and new entrance to separate the new portion from the remaining portion of the building. An independent alterations shop, and Shabree Jewelers which maintained its occupancy also remained a part of the mall and as part of the new development; Claire's closed after the holiday season when its lease expired. Two additional spaces built from the former mall corridor face out towards Meijer for tenancies, which remain unfilled as of the end of 2025.

Construction of the new Meijer store and its new entrances and parking lot continued into 2018, with the store holding its grand opening on April 25, 2019. Besides Meijer itself, a Starbucks is located within the Meijer, along with a branch of Kohler Credit Union, a Froedtert urgent care center (which closed down during the pandemic and then moved to a location several miles south due to lack of room), and a Meijer Express service station on opening day. Further development on the outlots included a Panera Bread location that opened on October 25, 2019. Shabree closed at the end of its lease in 2019, leaving the alterations shop as the last remaining small tenant from before the mall's closure. Bed Bath & Beyond would close in the spring of 2022 as that retailer instituted several store closing cycles nationwide, though the vacancy was quickly-filled with Burlington opening in the space in the fall of 2024.

== Images ==
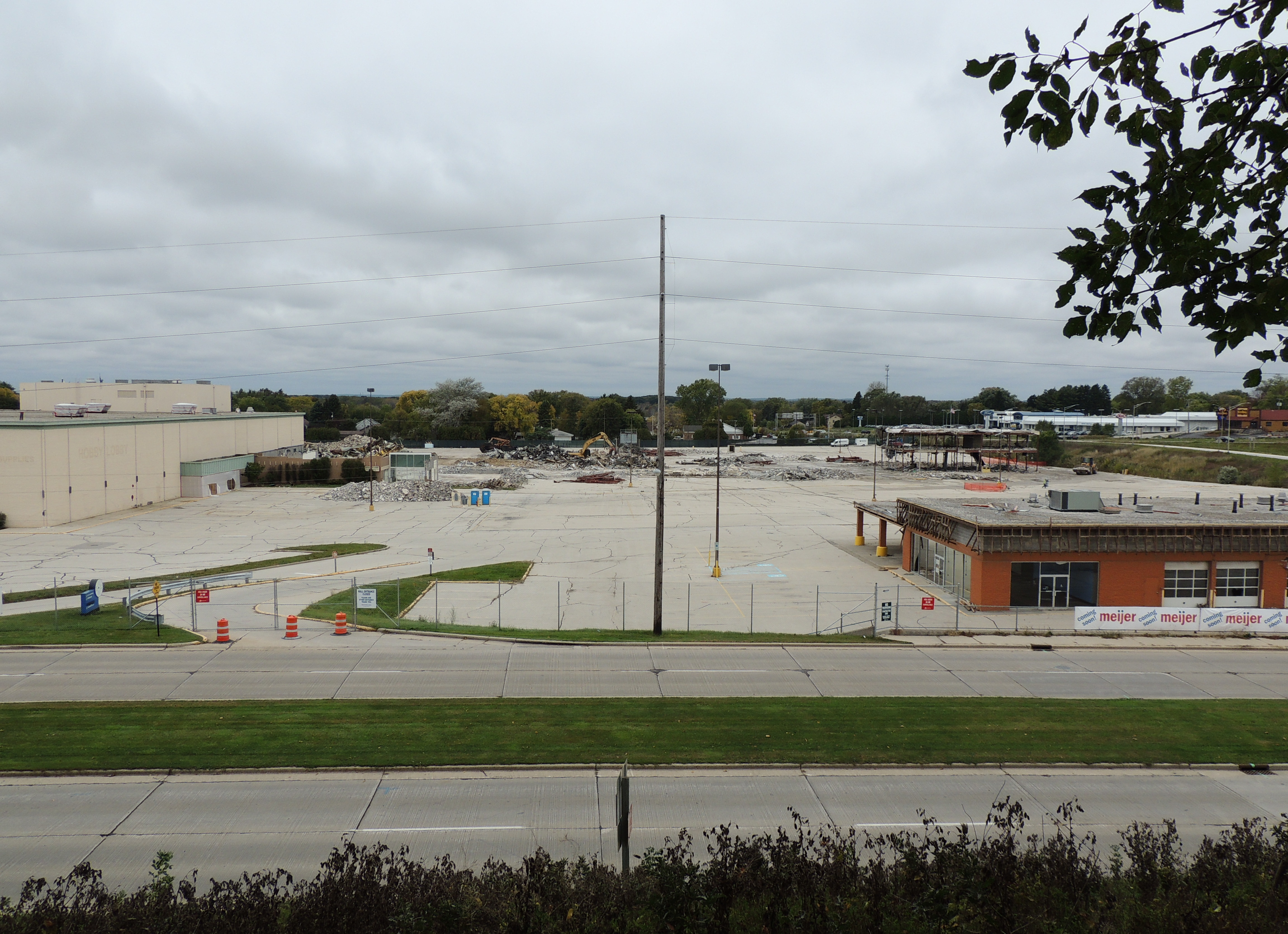
Demolition of Sheboygan's Memorial Mall on October 12, 2017. Sears was completely demolished and the Firestone beginning to be demolished while Hobby Lobby still stood before it was later demolished.

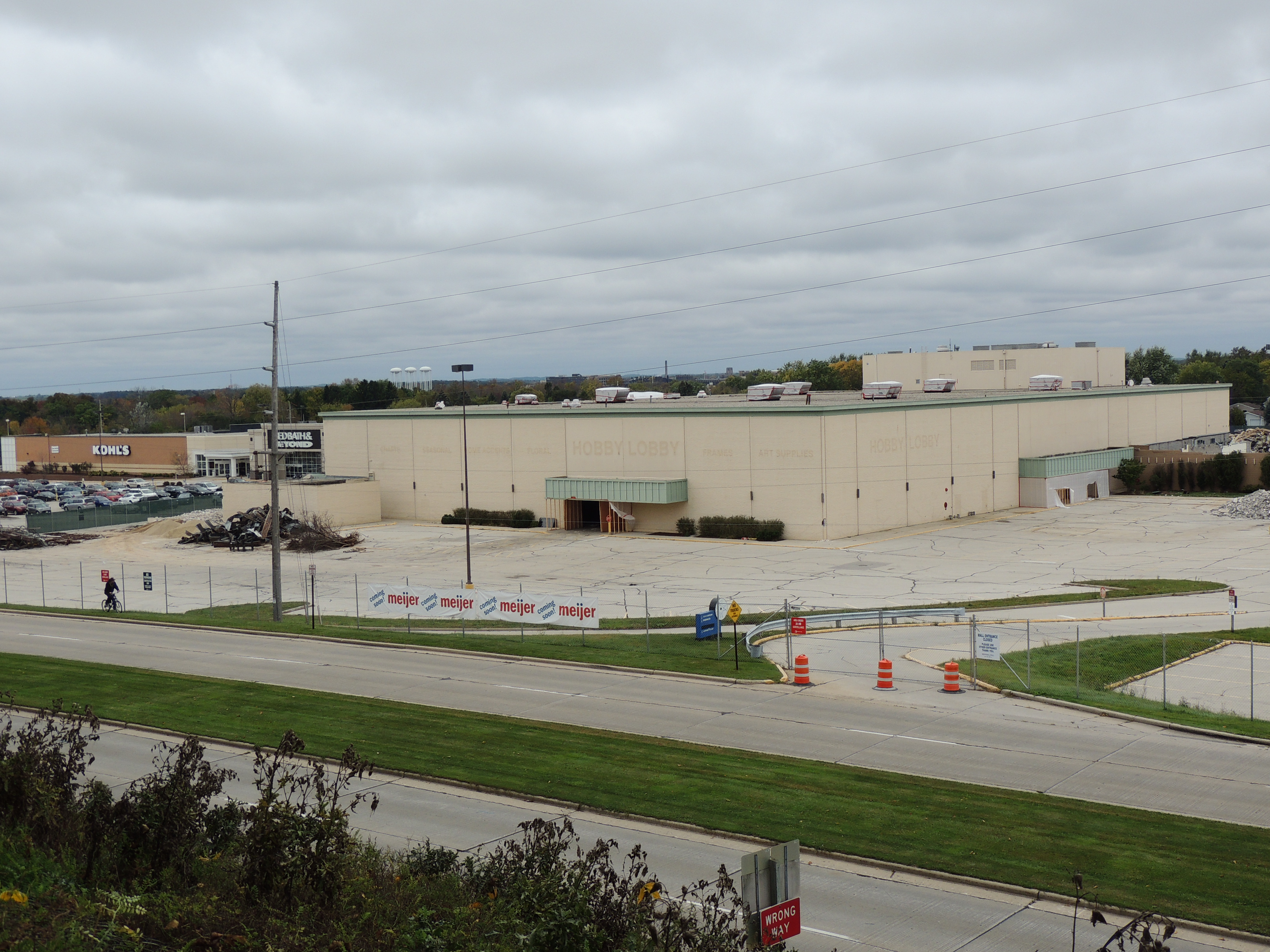
The former Hobby Lobby store at Sheboygan's Memorial Mall as seen on October 12, 2017. Sears was completely demolished and the Firestone beginning to be demolished while Hobby Lobby still stood before it was later demolished.
