= Port Plaza Mall =

Port Plaza Mall / Washington Commons
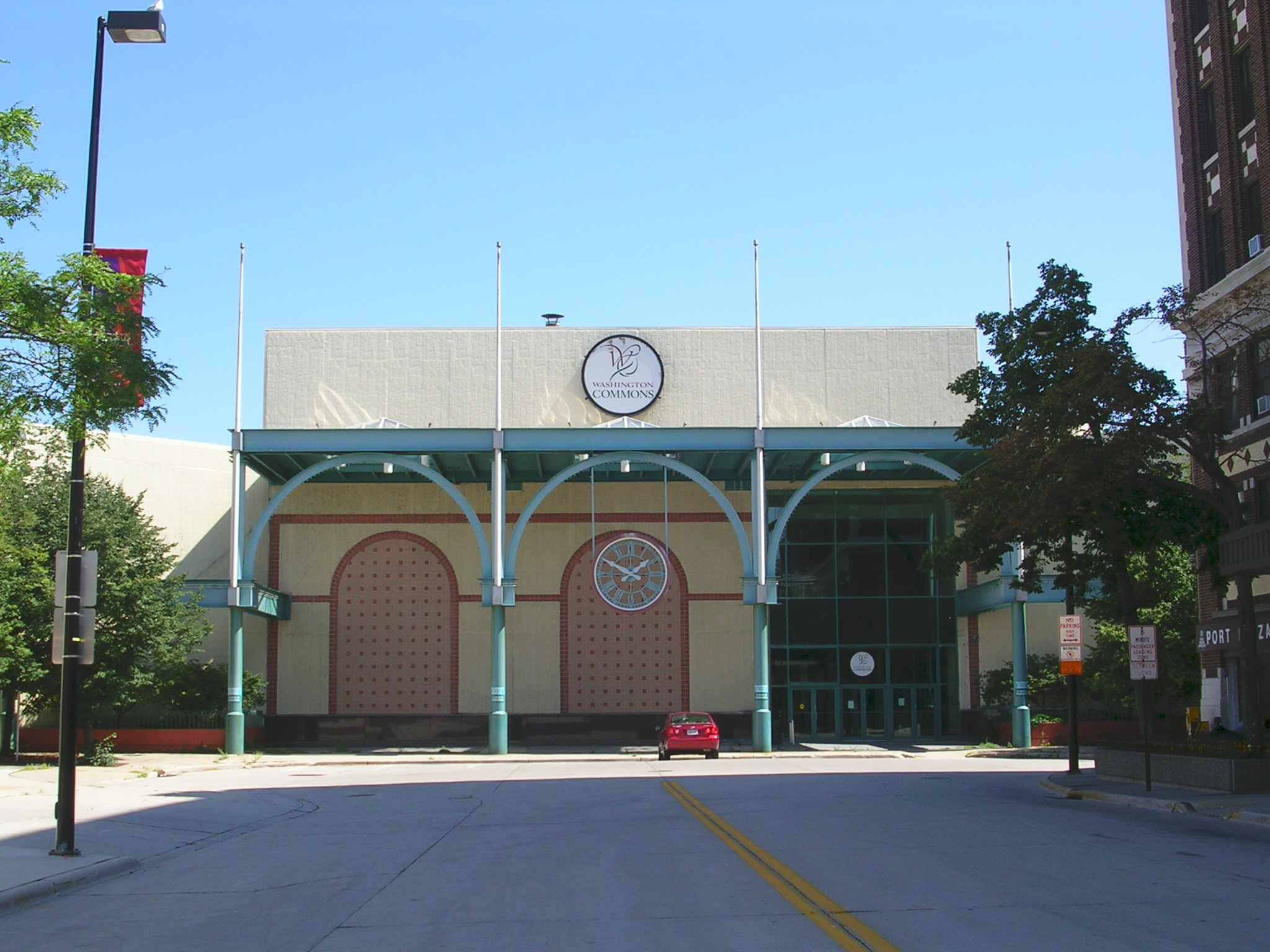
- Port Plaza Mall/Washington Commons entrance c. July 2007
- Location: Green Bay, Wisconsin, United States
- Coordinates: 44°31′01″N 88°00′46″W
- Opened: August 10, 1977; 49 years ago
- Closed: February 27, 2006; 20 years ago(demolished 2012)
- Developer: Port Plaza Development Co. Gruen Associates
- Architect: Sidney H. Morris & Associates
- Num. of stores: 120
- Num. of anchor tenants: 3
- Floor area: 300,000 sq ft (28,000 m^{2})
- Floors: 2 (5 in Prange's/Younkers)
- Public transit: Green Bay Metro

Port Plaza Mall (later known as Washington Commons) was an urban area shopping mall/multi-use facility located in downtown Green Bay, Wisconsin. The mall opened on August 10, 1977, and featured 3 anchor stores over the years, with JCPenney and H.C. Prange open at its launch and Boston Store added by 1982. The mall would go into a state of decline in the late 1990s and 2000s, Boston Store closed in 2000, Younkers which replaced Prange, closed in 2004, and JCPenney closed in 2005. The mall would close on February 27, 2006. The mall property was razed during the first half of 2012 as part of a redevelopment project; the headquarters of Schreiber Foods now stands on the main mall footprint.

== 1970s and 1980s ==
After many years of planning by city leaders, ground was broken for Port Plaza Mall in 1975. The mall opened for business on August 10, 1977, under the ownership and management of Chicago-based Mansur & Associates. At its opening, the mall had space for 99 inline tenants and two anchor stores, a 160,000 sq ft (15,000 m^{2}) JCPenney on the east end and a previously existing 300,000 sq ft. H. C. Prange store on the west end, having held its space since 1927. Also at the mall was a four-faced clock tower, whose bell and clock mechanisms came from the Montgomery County Courthouse in Winona, Mississippi.

By August 1982, Port Plaza Mall would expand by 160,000 sq ft (15,000 m^{2}) at its southern end, including a new food court and a 3rd anchor, a 110,000 sq ft (10,000 m^{2}) Boston Store. Metropolitan Life Insurance Co. purchased the mall property in 1986. Two years later, in 1988, Port Plaza underwent a renovation that included the addition of neon light fixtures, new floor tiling, and fountains in its center court.

== 1990s and 2000s ==
The first major anchor change for Port Plaza came in the summer of 1992, when H. C. Prange was acquired by Younkers and subsequently renamed. In 1997, Whitehall Funds purchased Port Plaza and 9 other malls from Metropolitan Life, and named Johnstown, Pennsylvania-based Zamias Services, Inc. to manage Port Plaza. Zamias lost its managerial status in February 2001. By this time, however, the mall was declining, as shoppers lost favor with the mall and its downtown location and preferred retail in outlying locations, such as Bay Park Square in the suburban Ashwaubenon. The mall lost one of its three anchors in 2000, when Boston Store merged with the same company that owned Younkers.

In 2001, the mall was acquired by Development Associates, who planned to turn the mall into a mixed-use facility with both retail and office space. The company would rechristen the mall Washington Commons in recognition of Washington Street's connection through the former food court, which was relocated to the former center court fountain area. A second-level skywalk connected Younkers to the mall. However, the exodus of major tenants continued, with McDonald's and Osco Drug leaving the mall in 2002, Payless ShoeSource in 2003, and LensCrafters, Champs Sports, and Bath & Body Works in 2004. Though Washington Commons attracted the University of Wisconsin-Green Bay, which opened a satellite campus and offices in part of the former Boston Store court in 2004, its last two anchors, Younkers and JCPenney, both left for newer Ashwaubenon facilities in 2004 and 2005, respectively.

Following JCPenney's departure, plans were announced for APAC Customer Services to move its offices to the former JCPenney space, but such plans ceased upon a failure to reach a deal. APAC instead negotiated the City of Green Bay and BayLake Bank to move to the former Boston Store location, where BayLake Bank was developing a branch and office space. Development Associates took the issue to court, citing a conflict of interest by the City and BayLake Bank, which happened to be the mall's lender. Though the parties eventually reached an out-of-court settlement, the cost of the suit would leave Development Associates in debt.

By February 20, 2006, under threats of foreclosure by BayLake Bank and disconnected electricity, the mall ownership implored its last six tenants to vacate their mall spaces by February 27. The city took ownership of the mall property as part of the settlement with Development Associates, and the property went for sale with an $8 million price tag.

== Post-closure and redevelopment ==
From February 27, 2006, until its razing, the Port Plaza Mall/Washington Commons property remained vacant and closed to the general public, though janitorial and security services would be provided in case of potential development and inspection. The mall's clock tower was removed in June 2010 after being repurchased by its former owners in Winona, Mississippi.

Several proposals to redevelop the mall property were announced in the years after the mall's closure, including a May 2008 plan by Middleton, Wisconsin-based T. Wall Properties that featured an 8-to-10-story office building with ground-floor stores and restaurants and re-establishment of the original, pre-mall street grid. An attempt that year to obtain federal stimulus funds for redevelopment of the site was turned down. In 2010, however, the city received enough interest in the property to seek $1 million in urban redevelopment funds to be put towards both the mall's demolition and the connection of Adams Street through the mall's former center court. The funding was part of an appropriations bill approved by the U.S. House of Representatives on July 29, 2010, but did not pass the Senate, especially with a new Congress taking over in 2011 that generally opposed such earmarks, including Green Bay's new representative in Congress, Reid Ribble, who unseated funding supporter Steve Kagen in the 2010 general election.

A more definitive plan came on June 7, 2011, when Green Bay-based Schreiber Foods announced plans to demolish the main mall property, the former JCPenney anchor location, which had never been redeveloped since its closure, and an adjacent Days Inn and build a new $50 million corporate headquarters and technology center on the site. TIF funding was transferred to the project in July 2011. The demolition of the mall property began with material recycling in July 2011, followed by the demolition of the Days Inn the following fall, and the demolition of the remainder of the mall during the first half of 2012. The new limestone-and-glass headquarters building, which opened in June 2014, consolidated Schreiber's Green Bay operations into one location. Formerly spread out among 6 leased offices throughout the downtown core, it also features green space and a new east–west street to connect Washington and Adams Streets.

Two of the mall's three anchor store locations saw a quicker fate than the remainder of the mall: BayLake Bank and APAC Customer Services moved into the refurbished Boston Store site in 2006, a building now known as BayLake City Center. In mid-2007, demolition began on the former Younkers building and the skyway that connected it to the mall in order to make way for several mixed use developments, including a new home for the Children's Museum of Green Bay that opened in 2012. The Children's Museum had been a Washington Commons tenant until 2005.

In December 2022, the clock tower from the Port Plaza Mall was reconstructed on Front Street in downtown Winona, Mississippi, where the clock's inner mechanisms and bell originated.

Spring Lake Church now has a downtown worship campus in the eastern half of the Baylake Bank City Center.
