= Forest Mall =

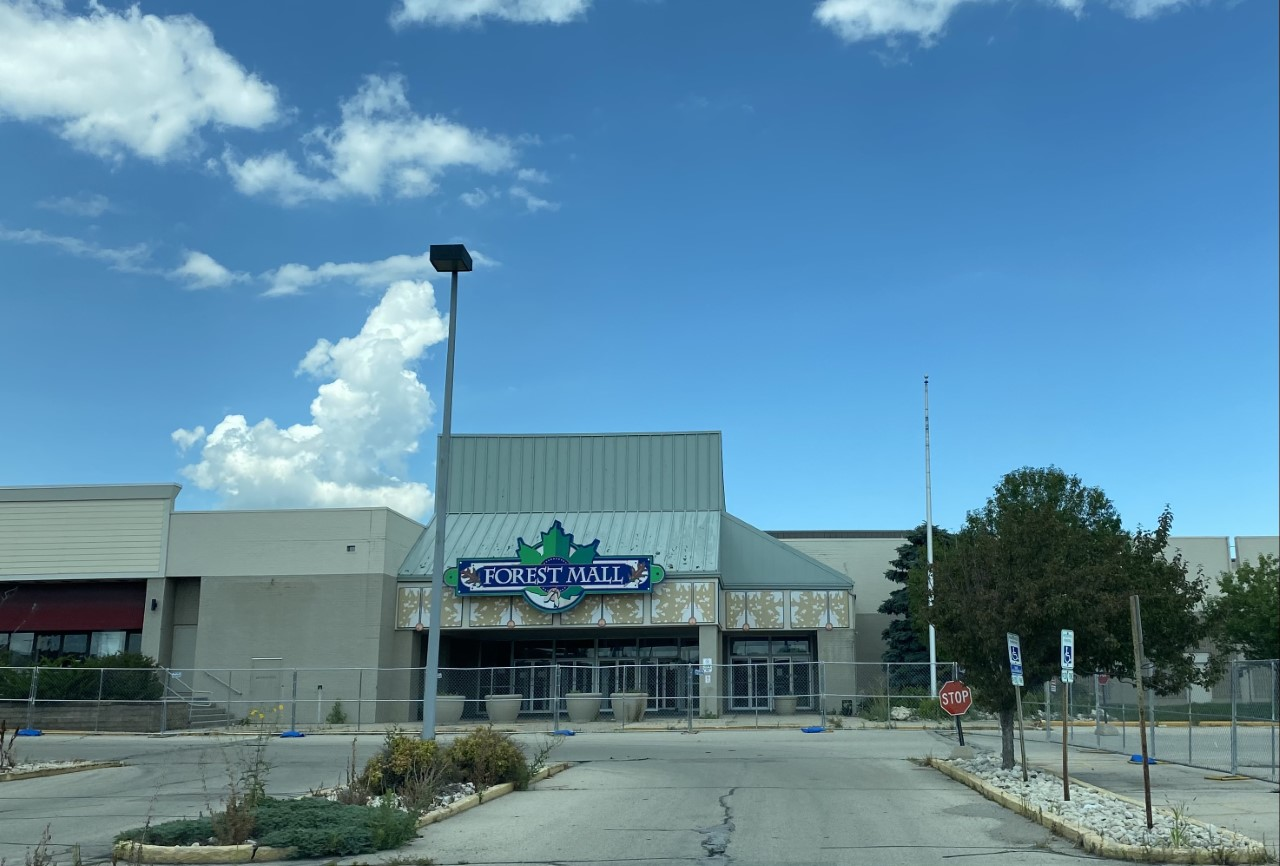
- 2020 shortly before demolition.
- Location: Fond du Lac, Wisconsin, United States
- Coordinates: 43.78633°N 88.47693°W
- Address: 835 W. Johnson St.
- Opened: 1973
- Closed: January 2020
- Developer: Melvin Simon & Associates
- Owner: ATR Corinth Partners
- Floor area: 500,000 sq ft (46,000 m^{2})
- Floors: 1
- Public transit: Fond du Lac Area Transit

Forest Mall was an enclosed shopping mall in Fond du Lac, Wisconsin, United States. Opened in 1973, the mall closed and was demolished in 2020. As of May 2024, The former Pranges/Younkers building, and the entire east side of the former mall is demolished. Kohl's operates in its space on the west side of the former mall and TJ Maxx continue operations in the former Staples location.

== History ==
Melvin Simon & Associates, now known as Simon Property Group, first announced plans for Forest Mall in 1964. The mall opened in September 1973, featuring Montgomery Ward, J. C. Penney, H. C. Prange Co., Prange Way and G. C. Murphy. A Copps Department Store was also located nearby. Of these stores, Montgomery Ward, J. C. Penney and Prange had relocated from downtown Fond du Lac. The Montgomery Ward space was later taken over by Kohl's, the Prange Way space by Sears and Prange's became Younkers.

Simon renovated the mall in 1998, adding skylights and new flooring. In 2006, several new stores opened at the mall, although most were local retailers.

In May 2014, JCPenney closed. It was the last of the original anchors in the mall. Sears closed on November 2, 2014, as did the Forest Mall Cinema. As a result, many retailers in the mall, local and national such as American Eagle, Aeropostale, PacSun, and Victoria's Secret closed as well.

In 2014, Simon Property Group spun off its underperforming malls, including Forest Mall, into an investment group known as WP Glimcher. In early 2016, Simon's investment group officially sold the mall to ATR Corinth Partners, a Dallas-based investment. Simon had developed the mall and owned it for more than 40 years.

Younkers closed in 2018.

By 2020, the mall had no internal tenants and was closed. Kohl's and Staples remained in operation, but had closed their mall entrances. In July 2020, demolition began. Staples closed too, and the mall and all anchors were demolished, with the exception of Kohl's, which remains open as a freestanding store. A Meijer store is set to be built on the site of the mall as well as a clinic for ThedaCare–Froedtert Health.
