= Peck & Peck =

New York-based women's wear retailer

Coordinates: 40.75682°N 73.97826°W

- Location: 581 Fifth Avenue, New York City, U.S.; New York City, U.S.
- Opening date: 1888
- Closing date: January 1991
- Goods sold: Clothes
- Interactive map of Peck & Peck

Peck & Peck was a New York City-based retailer of private label women's wear prominently located at 581 Fifth Avenue.

Peck & Peck was known for its classic clothes. Like Bonwit Teller and B. Altman and Company's post–World War II fashions, Peck & Peck personified and flourished in the pre-hippie era in New York when WASP fashion ruled stores and fashion magazines.

To writers like Joan Didion, Peck & Peck was shorthand for a certain kind of fashion look. An example of a store classic was the simple A-line dress.

== History ==
Founded by Edgar Wallace Peck and his brother George Farmer Peck, it began in New York in 1888 as a hosiery store, with an early location near Madison Square. At Edgar Peck's death, Time magazine reported that the brothers once had to pay rent every 24 hours to a distrusting landlord, but now had 19 stores. It grew to 78 stores across the United States.

Peck & Peck filed for Chapter 11 bankruptcy in 1974 and was purchased in 1976 by the Minneapolis-based retailing company Salkin & Linoff. Through a combination of poor management and widely decentralized locations, the chain was basically shut down and sold off in pieces. Some specific store locations of the chain were sold by Salkin & Linoff in the mid/late 1980s to H. C. Prange Co. of Sheboygan, Wisconsin. Salkin & Linoff closed their last five stores in January 1991, and the assets were sold at a bankruptcy sale.

Other fashion retailers that grew in the wake of the closure of Peck & Peck were Ann Taylor and Talbots. Since 2008, the Peck & Peck trademark is owned by Stein Mart for its line of woman's clothing.

In August 2020, Stein Mart announced that it had filed for Chapter 11 bankruptcy due to the COVID-19 pandemic, and that it planned to close all of its 279 stores, killing the last remnants of the Peck & Peck brand. However, the brand was brought back again when Stein Mart reopened as an online retailer, which is not related to the former company.
