= Marcus Younker =

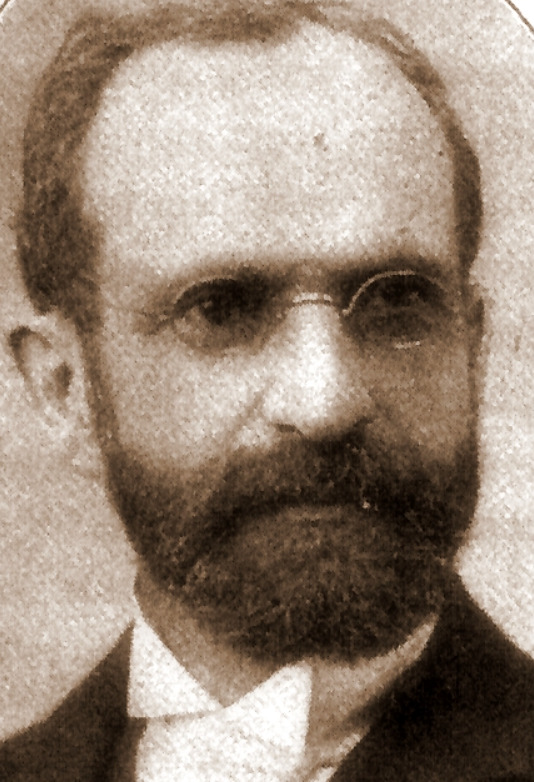
- Born: August 7, 1839; Lipno, Poland
- Died: June 16, 1926 (age 86); Des Moines, Iowa, United States
- Known for: co-founder of Younker Brothers
- Spouse: Anna Berkson

Marcus Younker (August 7, 1839 – June 16, 1926) was a Polish-born American retail executive who co-founded the Younker Brothers department store.

== Biography ==
Younker was born to a Jewish family in Lipno, Poland, one of six sons of Jennie and Isaac Younker. He was raised in Orthodox Judaism and received a traditional Jewish education.

As economic opportunities for Jews was limited in Poland, he immigrated to the United States as a teenager. He first traveled to New York City with his brother Samuel where they failed at several business ventures before moving to Keokuk, Iowa where their brother Lipman had settled. At the time Keokuk had the largest Jewish population in Iowa and was well situated as terminal for steamboat traffic thanks to its location at the confluence of the Mississippi River and the Des Moines River.

In 1856, Marcus, Lipman (1834 – May 22, 1903) and Samuel (November 7, 1837 – May 21, 1879) opened a dry goods and clothing store on the town's Main Street while supplementing their income with peddling wagons that sold to rural customers in nearby Lee County and Des Moines County.

In 1866, the importance of Keokuk was diminished with the opening of the Des Moines Valley Railroad which linked Keokuk to Des Moines. Forecasting that additional rail lines would further reduce the strategic importance of Keokuk, in 1874, they sent their half-brother, Herman Younker, to Des Moines to open a dry goods and clothing store in the city's Walnut Street business district.

In 1879, his brother Samuel died and soon after, they closed the Keokuk store. Lipman moved to New York City where he continued on as a buyer and Marcus took control of the now Younker Brothers Department Store in Des Moines and led its transformation from a dry goods store to a general department store. In 1881, believing that women would prefer to be waited on by women, he hired female salespersons, which was unique at the time. Marcus then sent his half-brother, Herman Younker to New York City to keep abreast of the latest fashion trends and in 1904, the company incorporated which enabled it to raise capital and purchase its local competitors: the Grand Department Store (1912), the Wilkins Department Stores (1923), Harris-Emery (1927), and J. Mandelbaum and Sons (1928). Younkers was known for catering to a wide variety of income levels with a "bargain-basement" for low income customers seeking value and a tearoom for more discriminating customers. By 1910, they had over 500 employees.

Later renamed Younkers, the firm would expand to seven Midwestern states.

== Personal life ==
Marcus married his first cousin, Anna Berkson, who had originally settled in New Orleans. His brothers married sisters: Lipman married Gertrude Cohen, and Samuel married Ernestina "Tina" Cohen, both daughters of New York City rabbi, Falk Cohen. As devout Jews, their store was closed on the Jewish Sabbath and Marcus was active in the local B'nai B'rith and was instrumental in establishing the city's first synagogue where he would later serve as president of the B'nai Jeshurun congregation.

Marcus Younker died in 1926 at the Commodore Hotel in Des Moines.
