= Salkin & Linoff =

American clothing retailer

Salkin & Linoff was a St. Louis Park, Minnesota-based retailer of primarily private label women's, junior (and to a lesser extent) men's and children's clothing. The retailer had a wide variety of store name plates, including S&L, Bostwicks, Peck & Peck, Stevensons, Wrangler Wroost, Hurrah!, Morrey Alan (later shortened to Morrey A), Nina B, Bostwicks for Men, Bostwicks for Women, and Mauritizos. The company filled the void in smaller midwest cities and competed with moderate retailers (e.g. J.C. Penney) while providing a similar merchandise mix but with a "small-town" feel.

The company was founded as a one-room shop in Elkton, South Dakota in 1921 by Joseph Linoff and Samuel F. Salkin. Salkin & Linoff grew to one of the largest independent clothing retailers with over 400 stores across the continental United States. Under the leadership of Sam Salkin's son Morrey, the company continued to grow through the late 1980s, but the growth stopped when aggressive opening of new stores could not mask volume and profitability problems. Key field managers feared the technology needed to enable point-of-sale (POS) throughout their locations would not be implemented due to cost (it never was) and that was a symptom for the company's decline.

An interesting mix of stores in the marketplace showed Salkin & Linoff to be a multi-dimensional combination of stores. This business model, plus poor senior management combined to force S&L out of business in 1990. The majority of the chain stores were shut down and a few small surviving stores sold off. A unique antique collection of store furnishings that were procured from around the world over the years by designer Richard (Dicky) Dordon was auctioned.

The primary flaw centered on the wide mix of selections (thus, limiting any particular impact) and the inability to be flexible in the smaller towns while competing against local retailers. Some surviving stores Peck & Peck chain were sold in the mid-late 1980s to H.C. Prange.

The company filed for Chapter 11 bankruptcy in 1990 and closed in 1991.
