= Mid-Cities Mall =

Mid Cities Mall
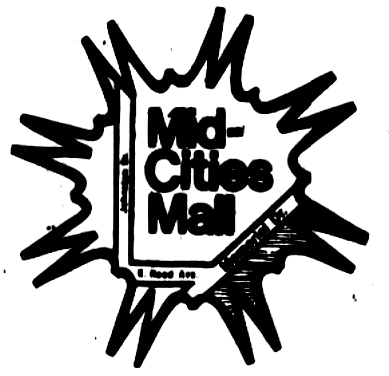
- Location: Manitowoc, Wisconsin United States
- Coordinates: 44°06′55″N 87°38′18″W
- Opened: April 4, 1968; 58 years ago
- Renovated: 1995; 31 years ago
- Closed: 2000; 26 years ago
- Demolished: 2015; 11 years ago
- Developer: Don Pauly
- Architect: Thorson and Thorshov Inc.
- Num. of stores: 0 (24 at its peak)
- Num. of anchor tenants: 0 (2 at its peak)
- Floor area: 250,000 square feet (23,000 m^{2})
- Floors: 1

Mid-Cities Mall was a 250,000 square feet (23,000 m^{2}) shopping mall located in Manitowoc, Wisconsin that opened in 1968 with 2 anchors and 24 store slots. Mid-Cities Mall closed in 2000 as Lakeview Center Mall, and was demolished in 2015.

== History ==
Mid-Cities Mall opened on April 3, 1968, with 2 anchors and 10 of its 24 stores. Mid-Cities Mall was the largest mall in the lakeshore area when it opened. The mall was developed by Don Pauly, and the architect was Thorson and Thorshov Inc., out of Minneapolis, Minnesota. They developed a handful of successful shopping centers around the country.

Montgomery Ward was the first store in the mall to open, in the fall of 1967. The Woolworths, which was one of their largest stores in the country at the time at 41,000 square feet (3,800 m^{2}), opened in February 1968. The JCPenney would open on the grand opening day. Osco Drug would open a store on April 29, 1968.

Mid-Cities Mall announced in 1984 that they were adding a brand new Hardee's occupying the former ID Bouquet, Mid-Cities Cleaners, and Radio Shack spaces. The Hardee's was to have a sit-down dining room, play area, general food counter, and a drive-thru window. Hardee's was projected to open by January of 1985. Mid-Cities Mall would also be renamed Lakeview Center in the late 1980s.

Montgomery Ward would close on February 15, 1986. The store would be replaced in 1988 by a Pierquet’s Electronics and Home Store, only to close two years later in 1990. In January 1993, Woolworth's would close their Lakeview Center store.

In 1995 Lakeview Center would be remodeled. This would include additional stores, a change in the traffic pattern within the mall, and changes to the interior. The mall would reopen in October 1996.

In 1998 Osco Drug would relocate less than a block away at Memorial Drive. On August 24, 2000 it was announced that the owners would evict 5 stores from the struggling mall. They had to be out of the mall by September 30, 2000. This raised many concerns on the state of the mall. Later that year, the Manitowoc Fire Department began using the Lakeview Center Mall for search and rescue training.

JCPenney would close in 2011 as the last store in the mall leaving the mall completely vacant.

On April 22, 2015 after sitting vacant for almost 15 years, it was announced that the Lakeview Center Mall would be demolished. Demolition begun on September 24, 2015 and was finished within a couple of months.

== Gallery ==
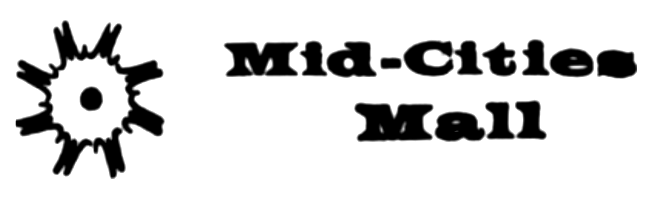
Mid Cities Mall logo from 1968

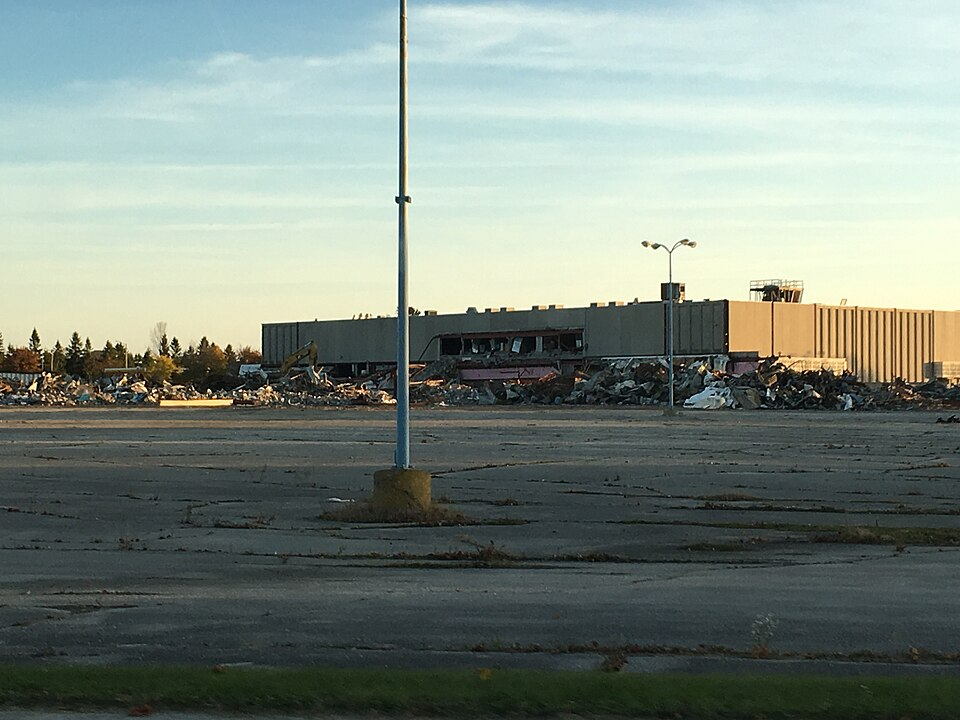
Mid-Cities Mall during demolition on October 22, 2015

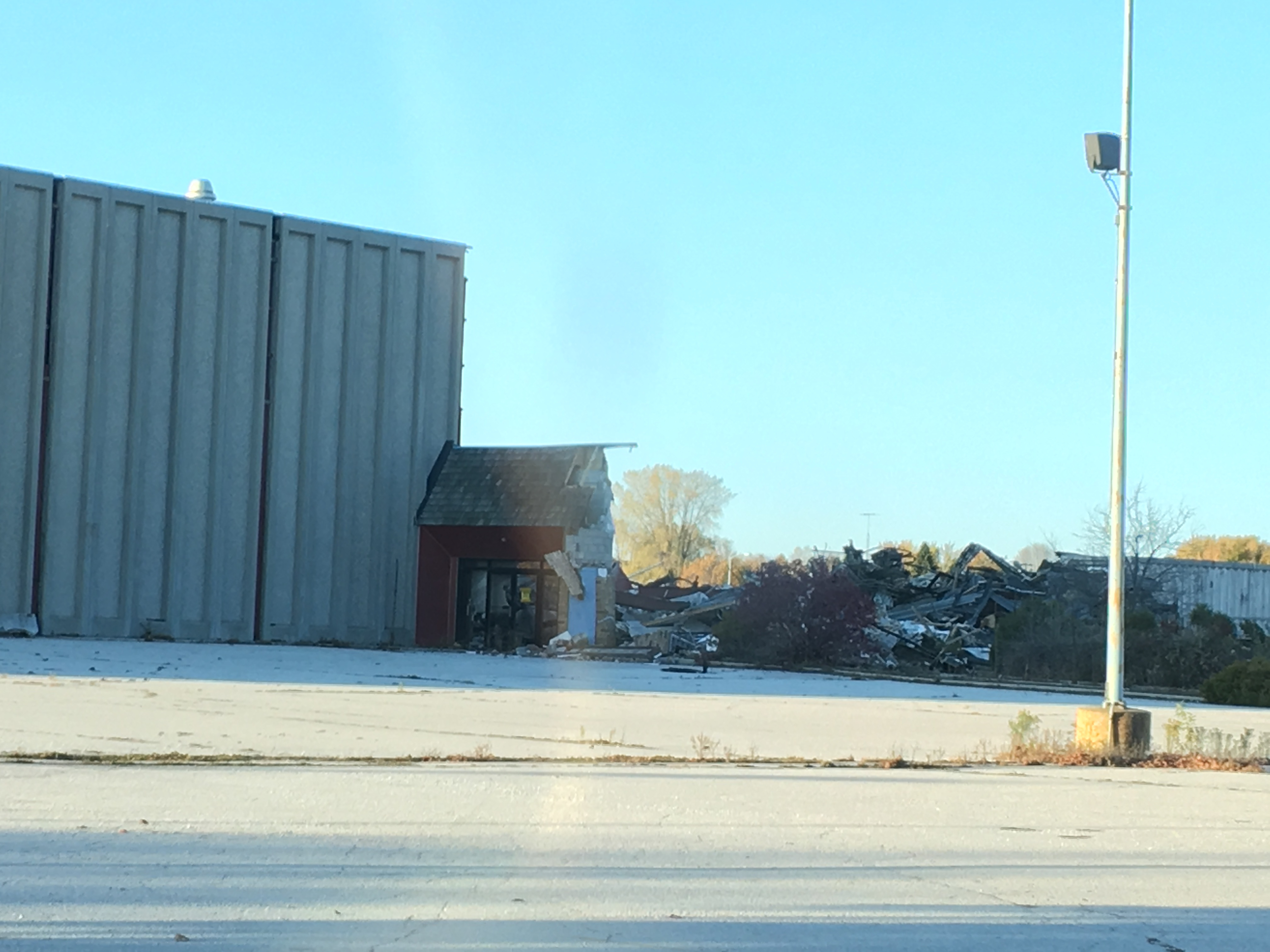
Mid-Cities Mall during demolition on October 22, 2015

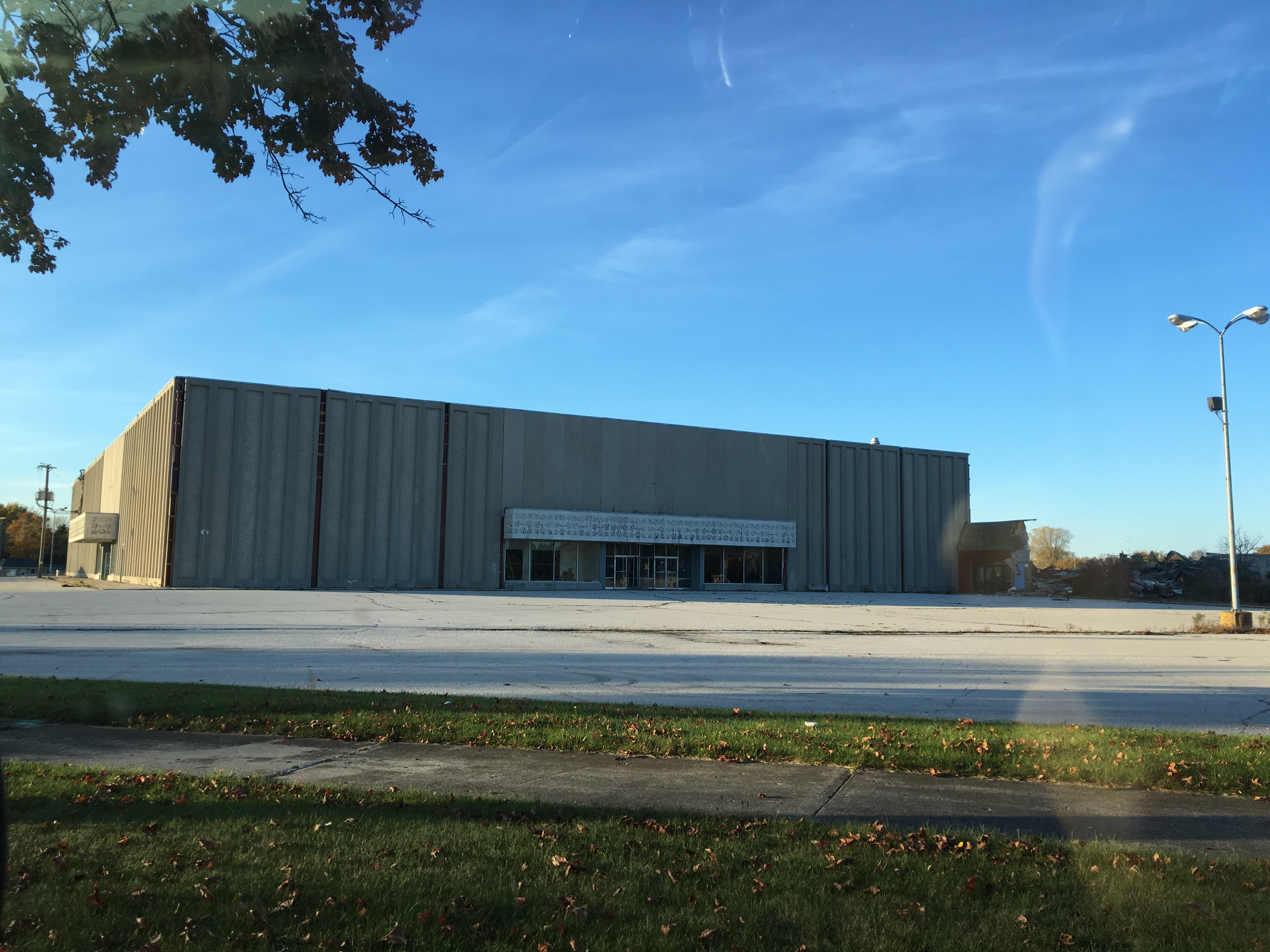
Mid-Cities Mall during demolition on October 22, 2015
