= Younker Brothers Department Store =

- U.S. National Register of Historic Places
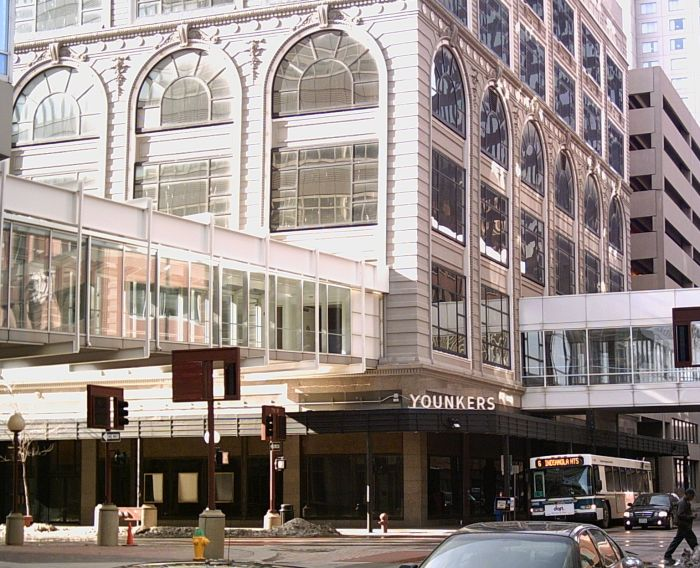

- Location within Iowa Location within the United States
- Location: 713 Walnut St. Des Moines, Iowa
- Coordinates: 41°35′9″N 93°37′36″W
- Area: less than one acre
- Architect: Liebbe, Nourse & Rasmussen
- Architectural style: Early Commercial
- NRHP reference No.: 10000079; 100002487 (decrease)

Significant dates
- Added to NRHP: March 17, 2010
- Boundary decrease: June 4, 2018

The Younker Brothers Department Store was a historic building located in downtown Des Moines, Iowa, United States. It was listed on the National Register of Historic Places in 2010.

== History ==
Younkers was founded in Keokuk, Iowa in 1856. They opened their first store in Des Moines in 1874 and moved their headquarters to Des Moines in 1879. Their flagship store moved to this location in November 1899. The original Tea Room opened in 1913 and was replaced in 1927. The building installed the first escalator in Iowa, known as the "electric stairs", in this building in 1939. Younkers closed their downtown Des Moines location on August 12, 2005.

Part of the building was destroyed in a fire during the early morning hours of March 29, 2014, that caused the upper floors of the building to collapse. At the time of the fire, the building was undergoing renovation into 120 apartments and retail space. While no cause of the fire has been announced, the ATF had ruled out arson as a possible cause following an investigation shortly after the fire. Demolition of the eastern part of the building began a short time later.

In August 2014, the Alexander Company, a Wisconsin-based developer, announced plans to continue with the ongoing renovation and restoration of the western half of the building. The revised plans call for adding 14,000 square feet of commercial space on the first floor of the building, creating 60 apartment units on the remaining floors, and renovating the historic Tea Room, which was spared during the fire.

In August 2018, The Younkers Brothers Department Store (and Younkers) closed.

== Architecture ==
The building is seven stories tall and rises 138 feet (42 m) above the ground. It was designed by the Des Moines architectural firm of Liebbe, Nourse & Rasmussen in the Commercial style.
