= Prange's =

American department store chain

H. C. Prange Co.
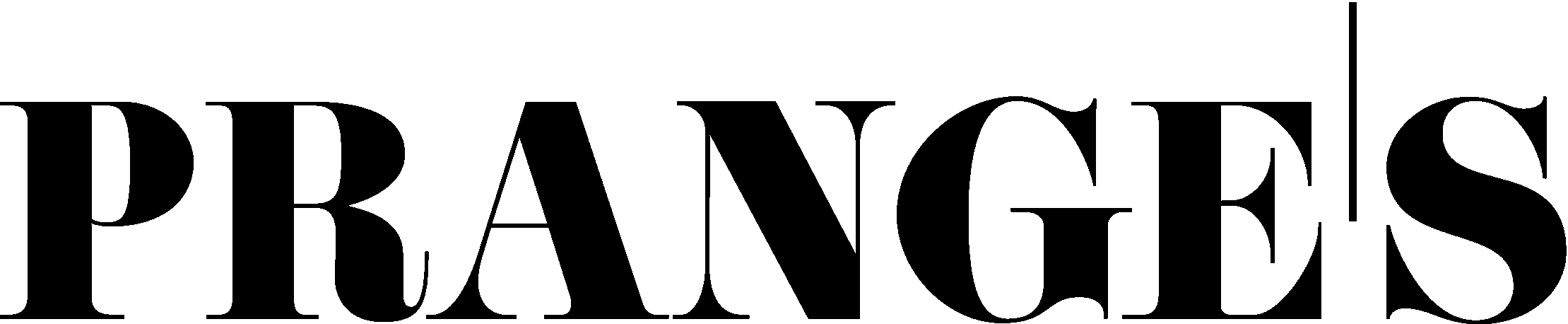
- Industry: retail
- Founded: 1887 in Sheboygan, Wisconsin
- Founder: Henry Carl Prange
- Defunct: 1992
- Fate: Acquired by Younkers
- Successor: Younkers
- Headquarters: Sheboygan, Wisconsin, U.S.
- Area served: Wisconsin, Michigan, Illinois
- Products: Clothing, jewelry, accessories
- Website: hcprange.com

H. C. Prange Co., commonly known as Prange's, was an American department store chain begun by H. C. Prange in 1887 in Sheboygan, Wisconsin. At its peak, it operated stores in the states of Wisconsin, Illinois, and Michigan. It also operated discount stores under the Prange Way name in the former two states, although this division was sold off in the 1990s. Prange's was dissolved and most of the stores converted to the rival Younkers chain after sale in 1992.

== History ==
=== Founding ===
Image of an Prange's store, taken from a 1991 GMC dealers ad

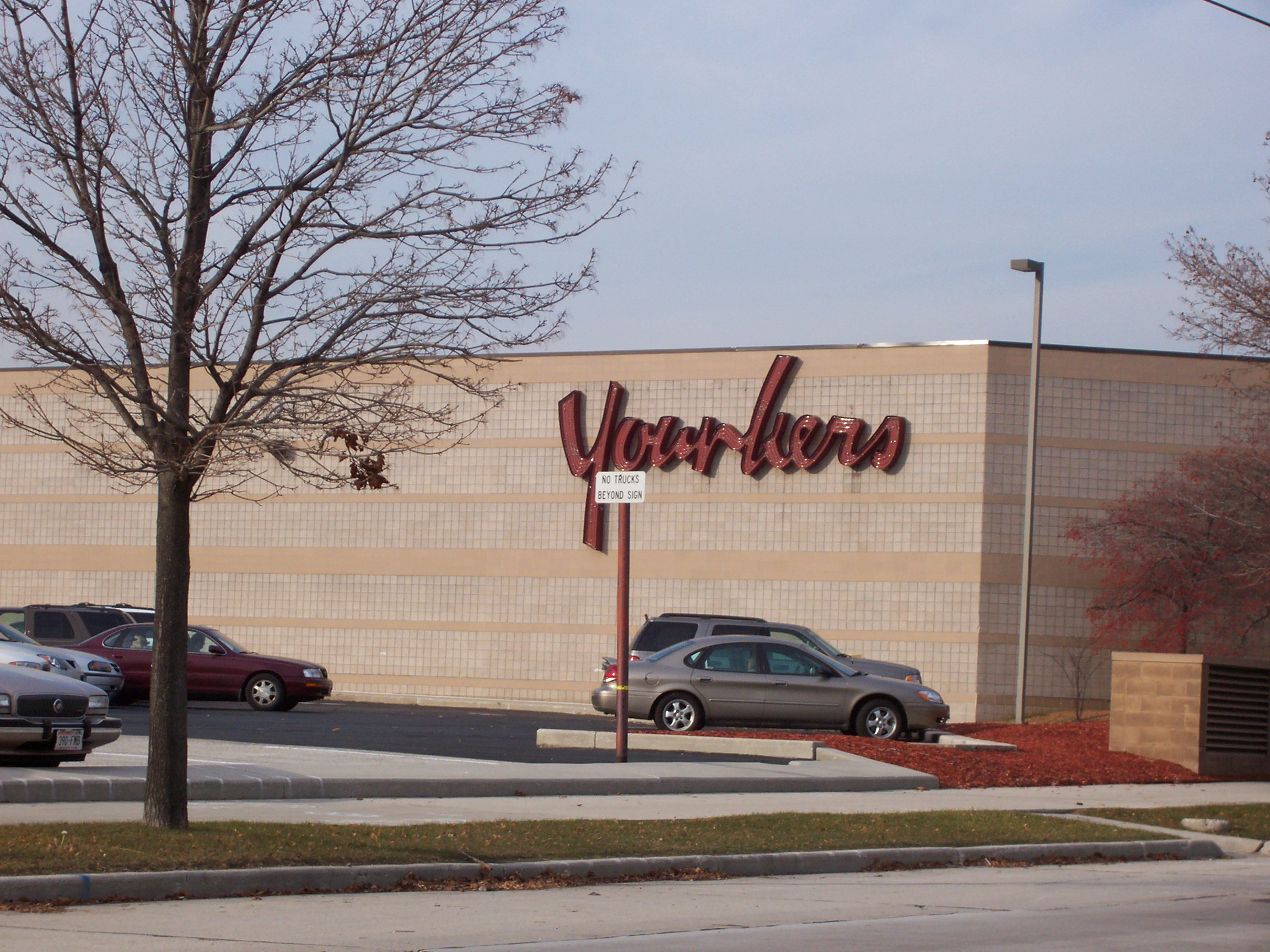
Site of original flagship store in downtown Sheboygan, Wisconsin, photographed in 2006. The store was converted into a Boston Store in 2008, closed in 2014, and was torn down a year later.

Henry Carl Prange was the son of farmers who had immigrated to Wisconsin from Germany following the Revolutions of 1848. In 1876, he began working at John Plath's general store in Sheboygan, Wisconsin, as a clerk, janitor, and delivery boy. In 1887, he attempted to purchase a share of his employer's store; after this proved unsuccessful, he founded his own store on October 4, 1887, with his sister Eliza, and brother-in-law, J. H. Bitter. The 3,300-square-foot (310 m^{2}) store located in Sheboygan was called H. C. Prange. Unlike his local competition, the store offered lines of credit to farmers. In 1898, it was incorporated as the H. C. Prange Company. By 1923, a new store was built on the same site with more than 180,000 square feet (17,000 m^{2}), making it the largest store in Wisconsin outside of Milwaukee.

H. Carl Prange's goal in 1930 during the stock market crash was to do one million dollars in the grocery business and two million in dry-goods. During the Depression, while still heavily in debt from the purchase of the Hall Dry Goods building in Green Bay, Prange acquired the LM Washburn company of Sturgeon Bay and opened the firm's third store. In 1935 a fire burned the Sturgeon Bay store to the ground. Five months after the fire a new store was built. The year 1946 saw the purchase of Appleton's Pettibone-Peabody store, one of the oldest retail organizations in the state. Over the years more acquisitions were made by the H.C. Prange Company, and existing stores underwent continuous improvement to keep abreast of the times.

At its peak, the H. C. Prange Co. had 25 stores, 18 in Wisconsin, five in Michigan, and two in Illinois, with a total of about 2,100,000 square feet (200,000 m^{2}) of retail space. In 1991, Prange's department store unit had sales of about $229 million (~$469 million in 2024). The company's largest store was in Green Bay's Port Plaza Mall. Some of the remaining Peck & Peck locations were acquired by the company after a sale by their previous owners, Minneapolis-based Salkin & Linoff in the late 1970s.

=== The End ===
The H. C. Prange Company's 25-unit department store division was purchased by Younkers, Inc. for $67 million (~$134 million in 2024) in 1992. Younkers also assumed about $9 million in liabilities of the division. Eventually Younkers would become a part of Saks "northern group" which later enveloped longtime Prange's competitors Boston Store, and Herberger's under the same corporate ownership. This division was ultimately sold to The Bon-Ton of York, Pennsylvania.

The former Prange's flagship store in Sheboygan ended operations in mid-January 2014 after several years of operating under The Bon-Ton's Boston Store banner after their purchase of Younkers. The building was reconstructed in 1984 when a water main break in 1982 forced demolition of the old flagship store after the building's support columns sagged. The 1984 building was torn down beginning in January 2015 over a two-month period, and was used as an open field for a series of concerts that summer before construction began on a new apartment development intended to spur the filling of professional jobs in the area.

== Prange Way ==
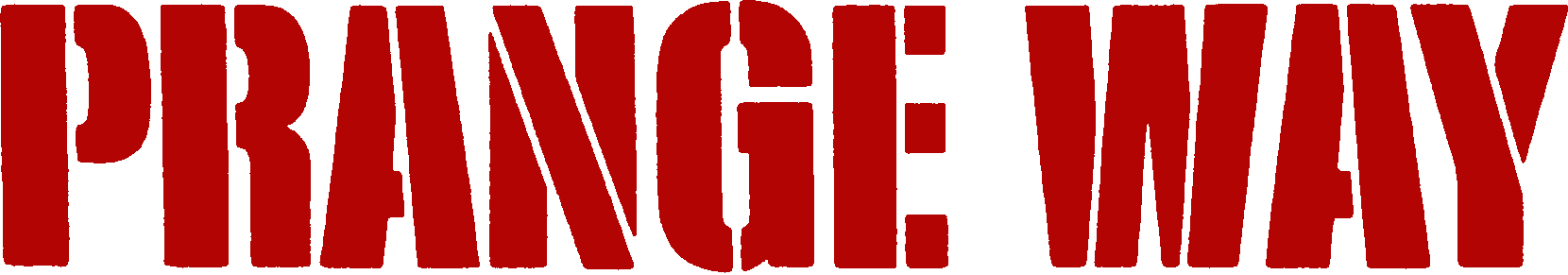
Prange Way logo

Prange Way began as a bargain basement store called Prange's Budget Store in the flagship building in 1911. The Prange Way chain later evolved into a discount department store, with several locations throughout Wisconsin and Illinois. Two of their first major discount stores called Prange Way opened between 1965 and 1966 in the cities of Appleton and Fond du Lac, Wisconsin. The latter was an anchor store of Forest Mall, an enclosed shopping mall. Throughout the 1970s and 1980s, several more stores were opened throughout Wisconsin and Illinois, with seven in these regions being purchased from Schultz's Discount in 1989.

In 1990 the Prange Way chain was sold to a group of Prange Way managers and other investors and its headquarters relocated to De Pere, Wisconsin. The chain filed for Chapter 11 bankruptcy protection in October 1995. An attorney for Prange Way cited competition from national discount chains as the reason for Prange Way's financial difficulties. Its largest debt was $3 million owed to the State of Wisconsin Investment Board. At the time, Prange Way operated 21 stores in Wisconsin and one in Minnesota, and did not plan to close any stores (though it did expect to lay off some employees). However, the stores did not last long after this, as liquidation sales were soon slated to begin in November. All Prange Way stores would be closed after the 1995 Christmas holiday season.
