= Younkers =

Online retailer and former department store chain

Younkers Inc.
- Company type: Subsidiary
- Industry: Retail
- Founded: 1856 (170 years ago) in Keokuk, Iowa, U.S.
- Founders: Marcus Younker; Lipman Younker; Samuel Younker
- Fate: Subsidized into online retail by BrandX.com
- Headquarters: Des Moines, Iowa, U.S. (until 2003); Milwaukee, Wisconsin (2003-2021); New York City, U.S. (2021 onwards)
- Number of locations: 49 Until the parent company's liquidation in 2018
- Products: Clothing, footwear, bedding, furniture, jewelry, beauty products, housewares
- Parent: Proffitt's (1996–1998); Saks, Inc. (1998–2006); The Bon-Ton (2006-2018); CSC Generation (2018-2021); BrandX.com (2021-present)
- Website: younkers.com

Previous logo used by the chain before being replaced by the current one

Younkers Inc. (/ˈjɒŋkərz/) is an American online retailer and former department store chain founded as a family-run dry goods business in 1856 in Keokuk, Iowa. The retailer had evolved over more than 150 years to include a presence in locations throughout Iowa and bordering states in the Midwest region of the United States. Younkers became influential as it acquired several rivals throughout the 20th century both inside and outside of Iowa. In the late 1990s, the chain was sold with ownership transferring out of state; further, its Des Moines, Iowa-based headquarters closed by 2003 as a part of a corporate consolidation.

Following its last sale in 2006, Younkers operated as a subsidiary of The Bon-Ton; the chain had locations in seven Midwestern states, primarily in shopping malls. As of 2013, the chain operated more than 50 locations in the region. On August 29, 2018, Younkers closed its doors one last time.

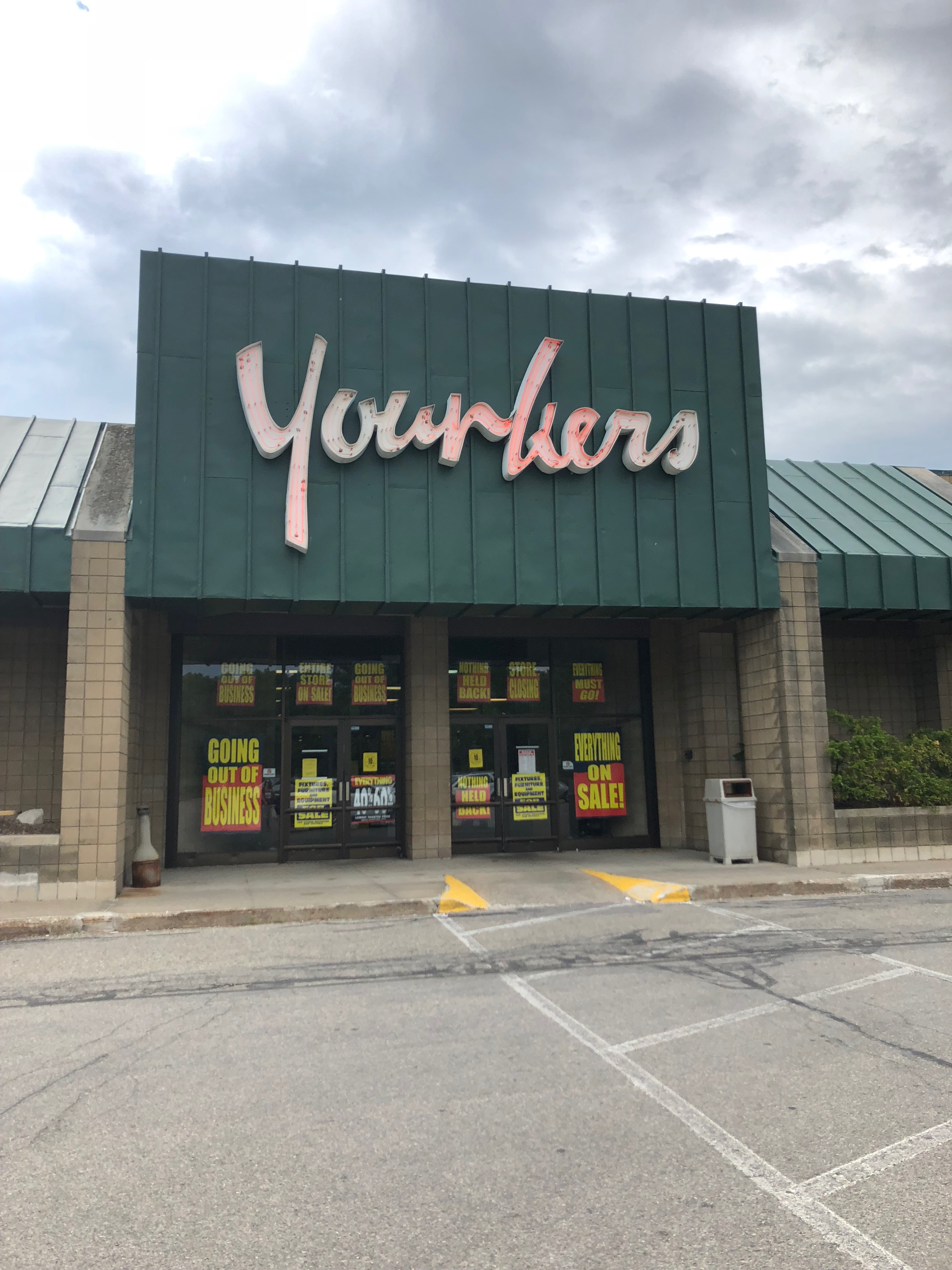
Exterior of Younkers in Traverse City, Michigan, located at the Cherryland Center, in a former H. C. Prange Co. The interior of this store was never remodeled, and retained 1970's style decor until it closed in August 2018.

== History ==
=== Beginnings ===
The company was founded by three Polish Jewish immigrant brothers Lipman, Samuel, and Marcus Younker, who opened a general store in Keokuk, Iowa, in 1856. Herman Younker, a younger half-brother to the three founders, opened a dry goods store in Des Moines, Iowa, in 1874. Following Samuel's death in 1879, the Keokuk store was closed and the Des Moines location became the main store. The future novelist and newspaper editor Eleanor Hoyt Brainerd worked as a clerk at the Younkers store in Des Moines in 1889. In 1899 the Younker brothers' main store in downtown Des Moines was moved to 7th and Walnut Streets, and it operated at the same location for 106 years before closing on August 12, 2005. The downtown Des Moines store became known for its Tea Room restaurant, which opened in 1913 and closed shortly before the store did. It also installed Iowa's first escalator, known as the "electric stairs," in 1939.

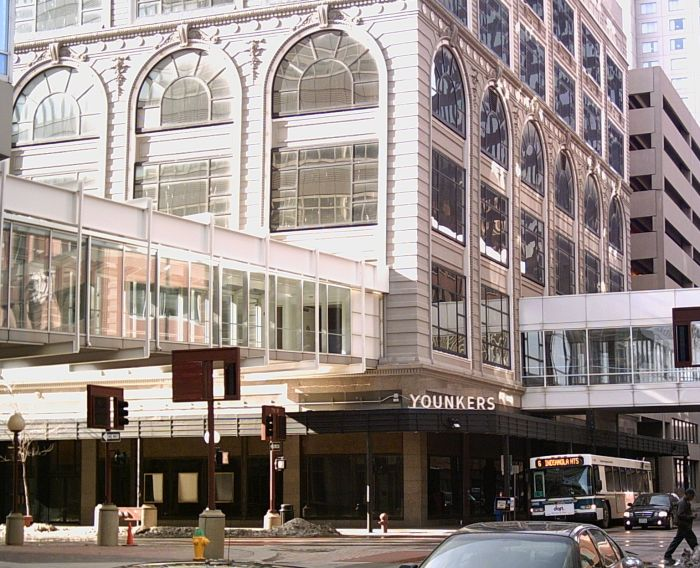
The original Younkers store in downtown Des Moines, Iowa. The building was vacated when the store closed on August 12, 2005. The eastern building was destroyed by fire in the early hours of March 29, 2014.

=== Younkers Incorporated ===
A series of additions, enlargements, and mergers resulted in the company changing its name to Younkers Incorporated. The department store in downtown Des Moines was purchased in 1912. The company started growing in the 1920s by acquiring other department stores throughout Iowa, including Wilkins Department Stores (1923), Harris-Emery (1927), and J. Mandelbaum and Sons (1928). The Iowa-based retailers Brintnall's of Marshalltown and Davidson's of Sioux City were acquired in 1948 and Yetters of Iowa City was acquired in 1949. Younkers began expanding outside of Iowa during the 1950s and opened its first shopping mall store in Omaha, Nebraska, in 1955. (It acquired another Omaha department store, Kilpatrick's, in 1961.) By 1978 Younkers had 28 stores in five states.

=== Fires ===
In November 1978, a fire broke out in the Younkers store in the Merle Hay Mall in Des Moines, killing 11 people. To date, it is the most devastating fire in Des Moines' history, and destroyed the original Younkers at the mall. It is also the third deadliest department store fire in US history. The fire was caused by faulty wiring.

In the early hours of March 29, 2014, a fire ravaged the former Younker Brothers Department Store in downtown Des Moines while it was under renovation. The eastern, original 1899 building partially collapsed in the fire and was demolished; the western 1909 Wilkins Department Store building, that Younker's had expanded into in 1924, was still standing as of 2016 and undergoing renovation.

=== Acquisitions of Brandeis and H.C. Prange ===
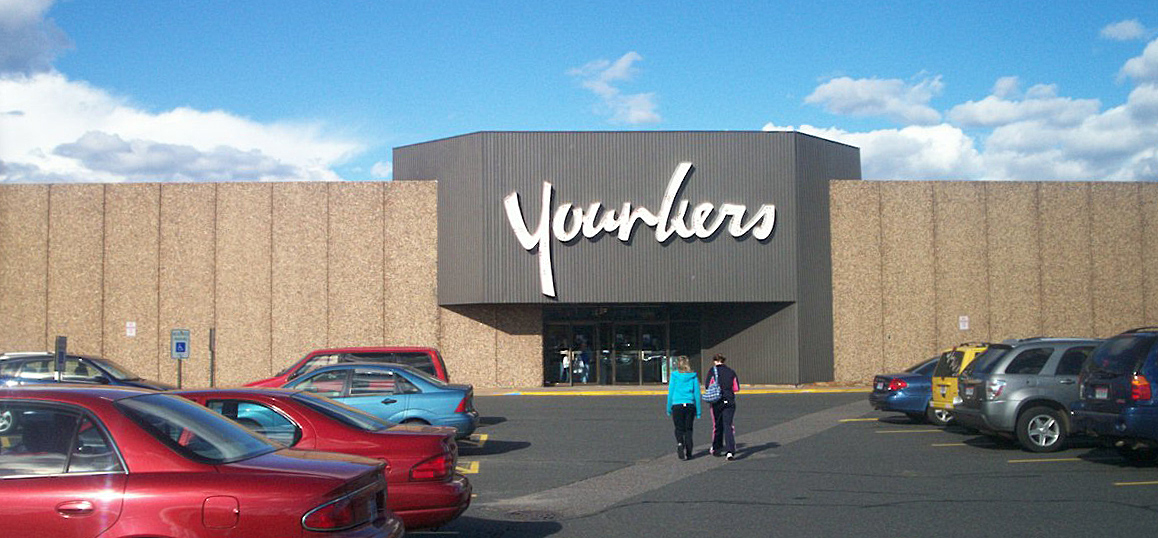
A Younkers in Marquette, Michigan which was converted from H.C. Prange

Younkers was operated by the Equitable of Iowa insurance company from 1979 to 1992 after being a publicly traded company since 1948. Under Equitable's ownership, Younkers acquired all 11 locations of the Omaha-based Brandeis department store chain in 1987. After returning to public ownership on the NASDAQ on April 22, 1992, Younkers purchased the 22 stores of the H.C. Prange chain in Wisconsin and Michigan.

=== Acquisition by Proffitt's ===
After a hostile takeover bid by Carson Pirie Scott was rejected in 1995, Younkers' shareholders agreed to a friendly merger by Proffitt's, Inc., of Knoxville, Tennessee. The merger was completed in December 1996. Proffitt's would later acquire Carson Pirie Scott, and in 1998 Proffitt's acquired Saks Fifth Avenue to form Saks Incorporated. In 2003, Saks closed Younkers' headquarters in Des Moines and merged its operations with those of Carson Pirie Scott in Milwaukee, Wisconsin.

=== Sale to The Bon-Ton ===
Saks sold Younkers and its other Northern Department Store Group stores (Carson Pirie Scott, Bergner's, Boston Store, and Herberger's) to Bon-Ton Stores in a $1.1 billion (~$1.64 billion in 2024) deal that was completed on March 6, 2006.

On January 31, 2018, Bon-Ton announced that they were going to close 42 locations nationwide (including nine in the state of Wisconsin) between February and April 2018.

It was further announced on April 17, 2018 that Bon Ton Stores would be closing doors and began liquidating all 267 stores after two liquidators, Great American Group and Tiger Capital Group, won an auction for the company. The bid was estimated to be worth $775.5 million. This included all remaining Younkers locations after 162 years of operation. According to national retail reporter Mitch Nolen, stores closed within 10 to 12 weeks.

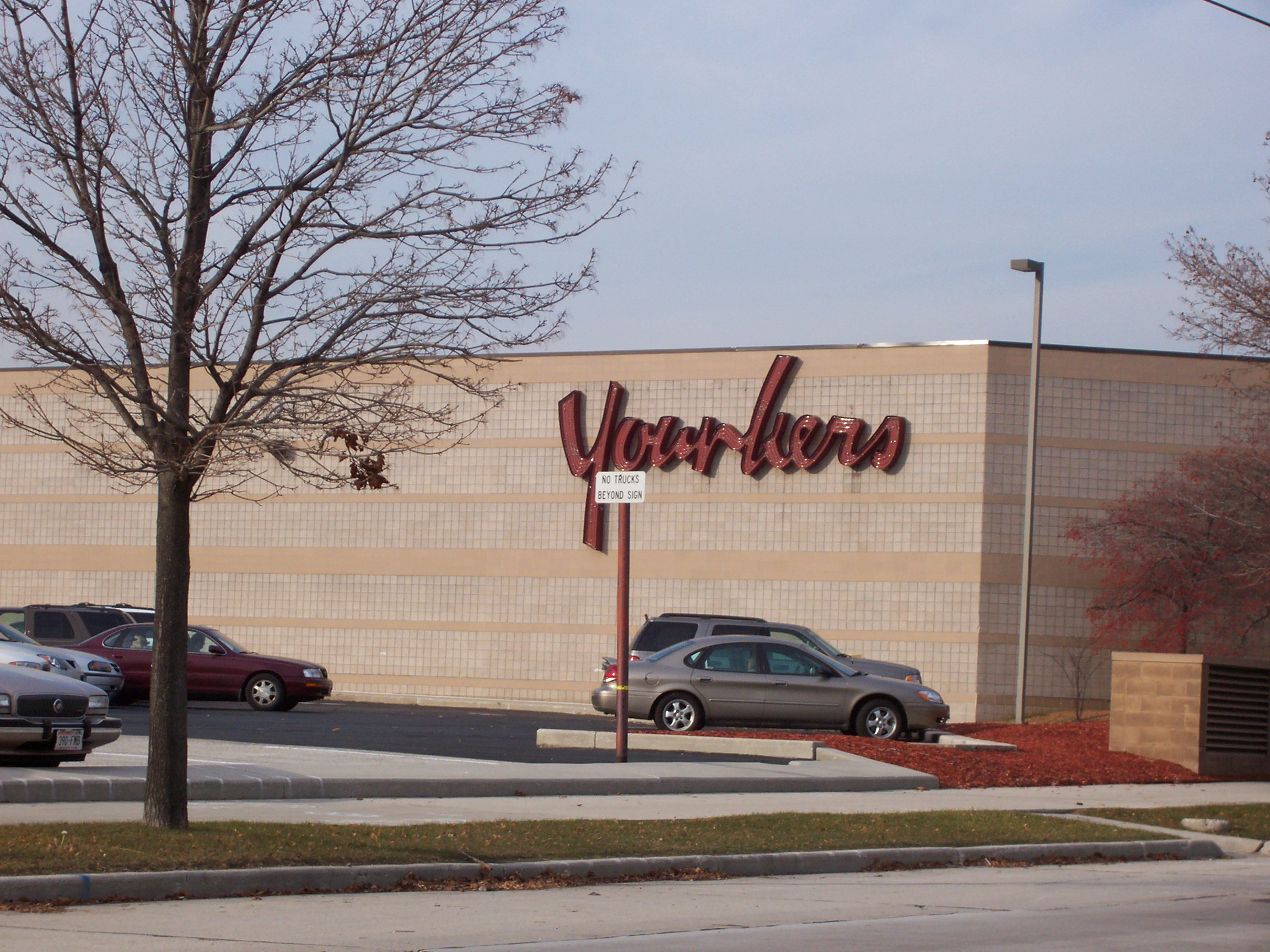
Exterior of a Younkers store in Sheboygan, Wisconsin, a former H. C. Prange Co., in 2006, which was converted into Boston Store in 2008.

On August 29, 2018, Younkers closed its doors and shut down.

=== Sale to BrandX.com, Inc ===
On September 10, 2018, of Merrillville, Indiana-based CSG Generation acquired all trademark and intellectual property assets of The Bon-Ton (York, Pa.). Subsequently, in early 2021, CSC Generation sold all the acquired assets of Bon-Ton to New York-based BrandX.com in a private sale.

In May 2022, BrandX.com announced that Younkers would reopen with a physical location in 2023. Those plans ultimately did not come to fruition; however, Younkers was revived as an online retailer.
